= PSL Player of the Season =

South African soccer award

The PSL Player of the Season in South African football is awarded to the most outstanding player. The winner is selected by votes from the premiership coaches.

1996–97	Wilfred Mugeyi	Bush Bucks	FW	Zimbabwe
1997–98	Raphael Chukwu	Sundowns	FW	Nigeria
1998–99	Pollen Ndlanya	Kaizer Chiefs	FW	South Africa
1999–2000	Siyabonga Nomvethe	Kaizer Chiefs	FW	South Africa
2000–01	Benjani Mwaruwari	Jomo Cosmos	FW	Zimbabwe
2001–02	Andre Arendse	Santos Cape Town	GK	South Africa
2002–03	Mbulelo Mabizela	Orlando Pirates	DF	South Africa
2003–04	Tinashe Nengomasha	Kaizer Chiefs	MF	Zimbabwe
2004–05	Collins Mbesuma	Kaizer Chiefs	FW	Zambia
2005–06	Surprise Moriri	Mamelodi Sundowns	MF	South Africa
2006–07	Godfrey Sapula	Mamelodi Sundowns	MF	South Africa
2007–08	Elias Pelembe	Supersport United	MF	Mozambique
2008–09	Teko Modise	Orlando Pirates	MF	South Africa
2009–10	Teko Modise	Orlando Pirates	MF	South Africa
2010–11	Thulani Serero	Ajax Cape Town	MF	South Africa
2011–12	Siyabonga Nomvethe	Moroka Swallows	FW	South Africa
2012–13	Itumeleng Khune	Kaizer Chiefs	GK	South Africa
2013–14	Sibusiso Vilakazi	Bidvest Wits	MF	South Africa
2014–15	Tefu Mashamaite	Kaizer Chiefs	DF	South Africa
2015–16	Khama Billiat	Mamelodi Sundowns	MF	Zimbabwe
2016–17	Lebogang Manyama	Cape Town City	MF	South Africa
2017–18	Percy Tau	Mamelodi Sundowns	MF	South Africa
2018–19	Thembinkosi Lorch	Orlando Pirates	MF	South Africa
2019–20	Themba Zwane	Mamelodi Sundowns	MF	South Africa
2020–21	Peter Shalulile	Mamelodi Sundowns	FW	Namibia
2021–22	Peter Shalulile	Mamelodi Sundowns	FW	Namibia
2022–23	Teboho Mokoena	Mamelodi Sundowns	MF	South Africa
