= Premiership Players' Player of the Season =

South African football award

The Premiership Players' Player of the Season is a South African soccer award granted by the Premier Soccer League to the most outstanding player of the Premiership season. The award is decided by a vote of all the active footballers in the league.

== List of Premiership Players' Player of the Season ==
Season	Footballer	Club	Position	Nationality
1996–97	Wilfred Mugeyi	Bush Bucks	FW	Zimbabwe
1997–98	Ndalo Msezane	Mamelodi Sundowns	FW	Nigeria
1998–99	Roger Feutmba	Mamelodi Sundowns	MF	Cameroon
1999–2000	Siyabonga Nomvethe	Kaizer Chiefs	FW	South Africa
2000–01	Benjani Mwaruwari	Jomo Cosmos	FW	Zimbabwe
2001–02	Jabu Pule	Kaizer Chiefs	MF	South Africa
2002–03	Moeneeb Josephs	Ajax Cape Town	GK	South Africa
2003–04	Tinashe Nengomasha	Kaizer Chiefs	MF	Zimbabwe
2004–05	Sandile Ndlovu	Dynamos	FW	South Africa
2005–06	Surprise Moriri	Mamelodi Sundowns	MF	South Africa
2006–07	Godfrey Sapula	Mamelodi Sundowns	MF	South Africa
2007–08	Itumeleng Khune	Kaizer Chiefs	GK	South Africa
2008–09	Teko Modise	Orlando Pirates	MF	South Africa
2009–10	Teko Modise	Orlando Pirates	MF	South Africa
2010–11	Thulani Serero	Ajax Cape Town	MF	South Africa
2011–12	Siyabonga Nomvethe	Moroka Swallows	FW	South Africa
2012–13	Itumeleng Khune	Kaizer Chiefs	GK	South Africa
2013–14	Sibusiso Vilakazi	Bidvest Wits	MF	South Africa
2014–15	Tefu Mashamaite	Kaizer Chiefs	DF	South Africa
2015–16	Khama Billiat	Mamelodi Sundowns	MF	Zimbabwe
2016–17	Lebogang Manyama	Cape Town City	MF	South Africa
2017–18	Percy Tau	Mamelodi Sundowns	MF	South Africa
2018–19	Thembinkosi Lorch	Orlando Pirates	MF	South Africa
2019–20	Themba Zwane	Mamelodi Sundowns	MF	South Africa
2020–21	Peter Shalulile	Mamelodi Sundowns	FW	Namibia
2021–22	Peter Shalulile	Mamelodi Sundowns	FW	Namibia
2022–23	Monnapule Saleng	Orlando Pirates	MF	South Africa
2023–24	Patrick Maswanganyi	Orlando Pirates	MF	South Africa
2024–25	Lucas Ribeiro Costa	Mamelodi Sundowns	FW	Brazil
2025–26	Relebohile Mofokeng	Orlando Pirates	MF	South Africa
