= Soweto derby =

Rivalry between two South African football teams

Soweto Derby
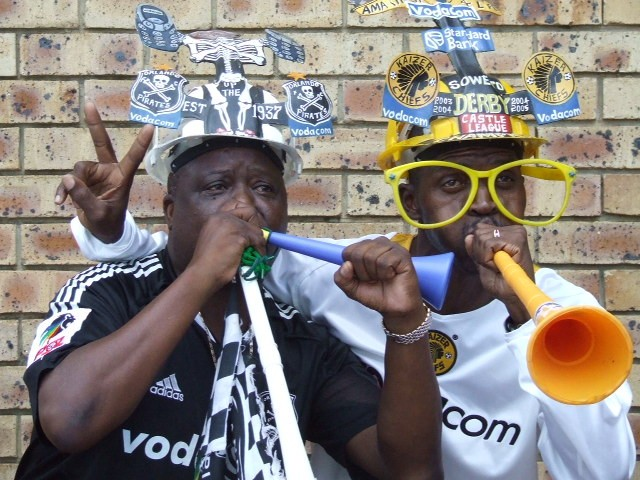
- An Orlando Pirates fan and a Kaizer Chiefs fan before the Soweto derby.
- Other names: "El Kasico"
- Location: Soweto, Johannesburg, South Africa
- Teams: Kaizer Chiefs; Orlando Pirates
- First meeting: Orlando Pirates 1–0 Kaizer Chiefs (24 January 1970)
- Latest meeting: Orlando Pirates 2-1 Kaizer Chiefs (31 October 2026); Betway Premiership
- Next meeting: TBA
- Stadiums: FNB Stadium (Chiefs); Orlando Stadium (Pirates)

Statistics
- Total meetings: 107
- Most wins: Orlando Pirates (51)
- Most player appearances: Happy Jele (33)
- Top scorer: Patrick Ntsoelengoe (19)
- All-time series: Chiefs: 37; Draw: 32; Pirates: 51
- Largest victory: Pirates 5–1 Chiefs (1998)
- Current win streak: Kaizer Chief 6 - 3 Orlando Pirates

The Soweto Derby is a football rivalry between Premiership teams Kaizer Chiefs and Orlando Pirates in South Africa. It was first contested on 24 January 1970. Matches between the two rivals attract a large fanbase. The rivalry is recognised as one of the biggest derbies in Africa.

The Soweto Derby is different to the Original Soweto Derby, which used to be contested between Orlando Pirates and Moroka Swallows.

Based in Soweto, Johannesburg, the rivalry stems from the fact that Kaizer Chiefs was formed by a former Orlando Pirates star Kaizer Motaung. Motaung had left Orlando Pirates to go play professional soccer in the now defunct North American Soccer League for a team called the Atlanta Chiefs. Upon returning home, he found a lot of infighting among the hierarchy at Pirates. He decided to form a Kaizer XI, which initially played friendly matches with various clubs in South Africa and then this entity evolved to the Kaizer Chiefs.

== Overall record ==
Team	League	Nedbank Cup	Telkom bvbCup	MTN 8	Total
Fixtures	53	17	5	10	85
Kaizer Chiefs	20	8	1	2	28
Orlando Pirates	12	6	1	6	25
Draw	24	3	3		32

=== Win percentage(%) ===
Teams	League	Cup	Total percentage(%)
Kaizer Chiefs	54.08%	34.34%	32.94%
Orlando Pirates	22.64%	40.62%	29.41%

== All-time results ==
=== League ===
		Kaizer Chiefs vs Orlando Pirates				Orlando Pirates vs Kaizer Chiefs			
Season	Division	Date	Venue	Score	Attendance	Date	Venue	Score	Attendance
1996–97	Premiership	18 January 1997	FNB Stadium	0–1		10 May 1997	Orlando Stadium	1–1	
1997–98	Premiership	22 November 1997	FNB Stadium	1–1		7 March 1998	Orlando Stadium	5–1	
1998–99	Premiership	9 October 1998	FNB Stadium	2–2		13 February 1999	Orlando Stadium	1–2	
1999–2000	Premiership	13 June 2000	FNB Stadium	2–2		20 November 1999	Orlando Stadium	1-0	
2000–01	Premiership	9 June 2001	FNB Stadium	1–0		29 November 2000	Orlando Stadium	1–1	
2001–02	Premiership	15 December 2001	FNB Stadium	0–3		4 May 2002	Orlando Stadium	1–1	
2002–03	Premiership	14 March 2003	FNB Stadium	2–0		7 December 2002	Orlando Stadium	1–1	
2003–04	Premiership	13 December 2003	FNB Stadium	1–0		1 May 2004	Orlando Stadium	1–0	
2004–05	Premiership	29 April 2005	FNB Stadium	1–1		29 October 2004	Orlando Stadium	2–1	
2005–06	Premiership	28 October 2005	FNB Stadium	2–0		9 May 2006	Orlando Stadium	0–1	
2006–07	Premiership	9 December 2006	FNB Stadium	1–1	80,000	28 April 2007	Orlando Stadium	1–1	6,000
2007–08	Premiership	10 May 2008	FNB Stadium	1–0	50,000	24 November 2007	Kings Park Stadium	2–2	50,000
2008–09	Premiership	15 November 2008		0–2	60,000	2 May 2009	Orlando Stadium	2–1	62,000
2009–10	Premiership	31 October 2009	Loftus Versfeld Stadium	0–0	40,000	20 February 2010	Orlando Stadium	0–0	14,000
2010–11	Premiership	26 February 2011	FNB Stadium	1–1	92,515	13 November 2010	FNB Stadium	1–3	74,875
2011–12	Premiership	17 September 2011	FNB Stadium	2–0	25,000	17 March 2012	FNB Stadium	3–2	87,171
2012–13	Premiership	8 December 2012	FNB Stadium	0–0	84,000	9 March 2013	FNB Stadium	0–0	80,000
2013–14	Premiership	26 October 2013	FNB Stadium	1–1	80,000	15 March 2014	FNB Stadium	0–1	90,000
2014–15	Premiership	7 March 2015	FNB Stadium	0–0	88,000	6 December 2014	FNB Stadium	0–2	71,282
2015–16	Premiership	31 October 2015	FNB Stadium	1–3	90,000	30 January 2016	FNB Stadium	1–1	60,000
2016–17	Premiership	29 October 2016	FNB Stadium	0–0	60,000	4 March 2017	FNB Stadium	1–1	55,000
2017–18	Premiership	21 October 2017	FNB Stadium	0–0	75,000	3 March 2018	FNB Stadium	3–1	86,314
2018–19	Premiership	9 February 2019	FNB Stadium	1–1	86,000	27 October 2018	FNB Stadium	2–1	82,000
2019–20	Premiership	9 November 2019	FNB Stadium	3–2	88,000	29 February 2020	FNB Stadium	0–1	80,808
2020–21	Premiership	21 March 2021	FNB Stadium	1–0	0	30 January 2021	Orlando Stadium	2–1	0
2021–22	Premiership	6 November 2021	FNB Stadium	2–1	0	5 March 2022	Orlando Stadium	1–2	0
2022–23	Premiership	25 February 2023	FNB Stadium	1–0	90,000	29 October 2022	FNB Stadium	0–1	90,000
2023–24	Premiership	11 November 2023	FNB Stadium	0–1	90,000	9 March 2024	FNB Stadium	3–2	86,764
2024–25	Premiership	3 May 2025	FNB Stadium	1–2	90,000	1 February 2025	FNB Stadium	1–0	90,000
2025–26	Premiership	28 February 2026	FNB Stadium	0–3	90,000	25 April 2026	FNB Stadium	1-1	94,736
2026-27	Premiership	March 2027	FNB Stadium			31 October 2026	FNB Stadium	2–1	

=== Cup results ===
Season	Competition	Round	Date	Stadium	Home team	Result	Away team	Attendance	Notes
1970–71	Life Challenge Cup	Final	?	FNB Stadium	Orlando Pirates	2–2 (aet)	Kaizer Chiefs		Kaizer Chiefs won 2–1 after replay
1970–71	Life Challenge Cup	Final replay	?	FNB Stadium	Kaizer Chiefs	2–1	Orlando Pirates		Kaizer Chiefs won 2–1 after replay
1971–72	MTN 8	Final	?	FNB Stadium	Orlando Pirates	10–1 (aet)	Kaizer Chiefs		
1974–75	Life Challenge Cup	Final	?	FNB Stadium	Orlando Pirates	3–2	Kaizer Chiefs		
1974–75	Life Challenge Cup	Final 1st leg	?	FNB Stadium	Kaizer Chiefs	4–1	Orlando Pirates		Kaizer Chiefs won 6–2 on aggregate
1974–75	Life Challenge Cup	Final 2 ng leg	?	FNB Stadium	Orlando Pirates	1–2	Kaizer Chiefs		Kaizer Chiefs won 6–2 on aggregate
1975–76	Benson & Hedges Cup	Final	?	FNB Stadium	Kaizer Chiefs	1–0	Orlando Pirates		
1976–77	Benson & Hedges Cup	Final	?	FNB Stadium	Kaizer Chiefs	1–0	Orlando Pirates		
1980–81	Nedbank Cup	Final	?	FNB Stadium	Orlando Pirates	1–1 (aet)	Kaizer Chiefs		Kaizer Chiefs won 3 – 1 after replay
1980–81	Nedbank Cup	Final replay	?	FNB Stadium	Kaizer Chiefs	3–1	Orlando Pirates		Kaizer Chiefs won 3 – 1 after replay
1983–84	Nedbank Cup	Final	?	FNB Stadium	Kaizer Chiefs	1–0	Orlando Pirates		
1987–88	Bob Save Super Bowl	Final	?	FNB Stadium	Orlando Pirates	1–0	Kaizer Chiefs		
1996	Bob Save Super Bowl	Semi-final	2 November 1996	?	Orlando Pirates	4–1	Kaizer Chiefs		
1997–98	Bob Save Super Bowl	2nd round	27 March 1998	?	Kaizer Chiefs	0–1	Orlando Pirates		
1998–99	Bob Save Super Bowl	Semi-final 1st leg	31 October 1998	?	Kaizer Chiefs	3–1	Orlando Pirates		Kaizer Chiefs won 3–2 on aggregate
1998–99	Bob Save Super Bowl	Semi-final 2nd leg	14 November 1998	?	Orlando Pirates	1–0	Kaizer Chiefs		Kaizer Chiefs won 3–2 on aggregate
2001–02	MTN 8	Semi-final	25 August 2001	FNB Stadium	Kaizer Chiefs	1–0	Orlando Pirates		
2005–06	ABSA Cup	Final	19 May 2006	FNB Stadium	Kaizer Chiefs *	0–0	Orlando Pirates		Kaizer Chiefs won 5–3 on penalties
2009–10	Telkom Knockout	Semi-final	5 April 2010	FNB Stadium	Orlando Pirates *	0–0	Kaizer Chiefs		Kaizer Chiefs won 3–0 on penalties
2010–11	MTN 8	Semi-final 1st leg	11 September 2010	FNB Stadium	Orlando Pirates	1–1	Kaizer Chiefs	75,000	Orlando Pirates won 2–1 on aggregate
2010–11	MTN 8	Semi-final 2nd leg	26 September 2010	FNB Stadium	Kaizer Chiefs	0–1	Orlando Pirates	69,760	Orlando Pirates won 2–1 on aggregate
2010–11	Telkom Knockout	Final	4 December 2010	FNB Stadium	Orlando Pirates *	0–3	Kaizer Chiefs	90,000	
2012–12	MTN 8	Final	10 September 2011	FNB Stadium	Orlando Pirates *	1–0 (aet)	Kaizer Chiefs	84,000	
2012–13	MTN 8	Semi-final 1st leg	24 August 2013	FNB Stadium	Kaizer Chiefs	0–1	Orlando Pirates	83,000	Orlando Pirates won 2–1 on aggregate
2012–13	MTN 8	Semi-final 2nd leg	24 September 2013	Orlando Stadium	Orlando Pirates	1–1	Kaizer Chiefs	40,000	Orlando Pirates won 2–1 on aggregate
2014–15	MTN 8	Final	20 September 2014	Moses Mabhida Stadium	Orlando Pirates *	0–1	Kaizer Chiefs	50,000	
2015–16	Telkom Knockout	Semi-final	7 November 2015	FNB Stadium	Kaizer Chiefs	0–0	Orlando Pirates		Kaizer Chiefs won 6–5 on penalties
2015–16	Nedbank Cup	Round 32	5 March 2016	FNB Stadium	Kaizer Chiefs	0–2	Orlando Pirates	90,000	
2018–19	Telkom Knockout	Semi-final	24 November 2018	Moses Mabhida Stadium	Kaizer Chiefs	1–2	Orlando Pirates	55,000	
2019–20	Telkom Knockout	Semi-final	24 November 2019	Moses Mabhida Stadium	Kaizer Chiefs	2–2	Orlando Pirates	55,000	Kaizer Chiefs won 4–2 on penalties
2020–21	2020 MTN 8	Semi-final 1st leg	31 October 2020	Orlando Stadium	Orlando Pirates	3–0	Kaizer Chiefs	0	Orlando Pirates won 5–0 on aggregate
2020–21	2020 MTN 8	Semi-final 2nd leg	8 November 2020	FNB Stadium	Kaizer Chiefs	0–2	Orlando Pirates	0	Orlando Pirates won 5–0 on aggregate
2022–23	Nedbank Cup	Semi-final	6 May 2023	FNB Stadium	Kaizer Chiefs	1–2	Orlando Pirates	90,000	
2024-25	Nedbank Cup	Final	10 May 2025	Moses Mabhida Stadium	Kaizer Chiefs	2–1	Orlando Pirates	57,000	

* Played as a neutral game with one side designated as the 'home team'.

== Honours ==
Orlando Pirates	Competition	Kaizer Chiefs
Domestic
5	South African Premiership (1996 - present)	4
10	Nedbank Cup	14
14	MTN 8	15
2	Telkom Knockout	13
1	National Soccer League (South Africa) (1985 to 1996)	3
4	National Professional Soccer League (South Africa) (1971 to 1984)	5
36	Aggregate	53
Continental
1	CAF Champions League	0
0	African Cup Winners' Cup (defunct)	1
1	CAF Super Cup	0
2	Aggregate	1
38	Total aggregate	54

== Head-to-head ranking in the South African Premiership (1996–present) ==
Pos.	97	98	99	00	01	02	03	04	05	06	07	08	09	10	11	12	13	14	15	16	17	18	19	20	21	22	23	24
1					1		1	1	1						1	1	1		1									
2	2	2	2	2	2				2	2			2					2				2	2	2			2	2
3	3	3	3	3		3				3			3	3	3		3					3		3	3			
4																		4	4		4							
5								5			5			5		5				5						5	5	
6							6					6														6		
7																				7								
8												8													8			
9						9					9												9					
10																												10
11																					11							
12																												
13																												
14																												
15																												
16																												
17																												
18																												

- Total: Kaizer Chiefs with 14 higher finishes, Orlando Pirates with 14 higher finishes (as of the end of the 2023–24 season).
- The biggest difference in positions for Kaizer Chiefs from Orlando Pirates is 7 places (2016–17season), The biggest difference in positions for Orlando Pirates from Kaizer Chiefs is 8 places (2023–24 season).
