= Dean Furman =

South African footballer (born 1988)

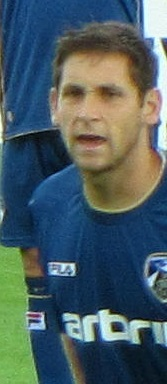
- Furman playing for Oldham Athletic in 2012

Personal information
- Full name: Dean Furman
- Date of birth: 22 June 1988 (age 38)
- Place of birth: Cape Town, South Africa
- Height: 1.75 m (5 ft 9 in)
- Position: Midfielder

Team information
- Current team: Warrington Rylands 1906

Youth career
- Radlett Rangers
- 2003–2006: Chelsea
- 2006–2008: Rangers

Senior career*
Years	Team	Apps	(Gls)
2008–2009	Rangers	1	(0)
2008–2009	→ Bradford City (loan)	31	(5)
2009–2013	Oldham Athletic	131	(8)
2013	→ Doncaster Rovers (loan)	8	(0)
2013–2015	Doncaster Rovers	50	(3)
2015–2020	SuperSport United	101	(3)
2020–2021	Carlisle United	17	(0)
2021–2022	Altrincham	9	(0)
2022–	Warrington Rylands 1906	96	(2)

International career^{‡}
2012–2020	South Africa	58	(4)
- * Club domestic league appearances and goals as of 19:04, 17 September 2024 (UTC) ‡ National team caps and goals as of 16 November 2020

Dean Furman (born 22 June 1988) is a South African professional soccer player who plays as a midfielder for English side Warrington Rylands 1906. He has previously played for Scottish Premiership side Rangers, English League Two side Bradford City, League One sides Oldham Athletic and Doncaster Rovers, and South African Premier Soccer League side SuperSport United.

He made his debut for the South Africa national team in 2012, representing the nation at three Africa Cup of Nations tournaments, and as of August 2020 had captained the team and won 56 caps, scoring four goals.

== Club career ==
=== Chelsea ===
Furman began his footballing career at nine years of age as a youth team player at Premier League club Chelsea, leaving at 18 years of age.

=== Rangers ===
He signed for Scottish Premiership side Rangers on 10 May 2006. Furman was a regular in the reserve side and captained the Under-19 team to the Scottish Youth Cup final in 2007, where they beat Old Firm rivals Celtic.

He signed a new two-year contract on 24 October 2007. Furman made his professional debut in a 3–1 Scottish Premier League win at Ibrox against Dundee United on 10 May 2008, as a 52nd-minute substitute for Kevin Thomson. He played for three years for Rangers.

=== Bradford City ===
On 27 August 2008, he joined English League Two side Bradford City, managed by former Rangers midfielder Stuart McCall, on loan until January. He made his debut for Bradford City as a late substitute in a 3–2 defeat away to Aldershot Town three days after his signing before he made his first start in a Football League Trophy game with Leeds United and first league start at Shrewsbury Town, all of which ended in defeats for Bradford. After playing 12 league games for Bradford, he pulled his hamstring, which kept him out for more than a month before he returned to action in a reserve game against Hartlepool United on 16 December. His first game back in the first team was as a late substitute in a 0–0 draw with Lincoln City ten days later. Having returned to fitness, Furman also extended his loan spell with Bradford to the end of the season. His first goal for Bradford came later the same month when he scored Bradford's first equaliser in a 3–3 league draw with Luton Town.

=== Oldham Athletic ===
Furman returned to Rangers at the end of the season and was offered a new one-year deal at Ibrox, as well as an offer from Bradford City.

Instead, Furman returned to England with English League One side Oldham Athletic, joining them on 29 June 2009, on a three-year contract. Furman won the Football League Goal of the Year 2011 for his effort against Notts County on 14 August 2010. Furman was appointed captain of Oldham Athletic for the 2011–12 season, at 23 years of age. In four seasons with Oldham he scored nine goals in 147 appearances across all competitions.

=== Doncaster Rovers ===
Though still club captain of Oldham, English League One side Doncaster Rovers signed him on loan on 14 March 2013 for the remainder of the 2012–13 season. Doncaster Rovers were promoted on the last day of the league season, and Furman helped them to the League One title in the 2012–13 season. At the end of the season Furman joined Doncaster permanently, signing a two-year contract. On 18 May 2015, after two years, 82 games, and three goals scored with the side, he was one of six players released by the club.

=== SuperSport United ===
After rejecting a contract extension from Doncaster Rovers, on 18 August 2015 Furman signed for South African Premier Soccer League side SuperSport United on a two-year deal, with an option of a further year. With SuperSport United, in five years and 101 games he won two MTN 8 trophies and two Nedbank Cups, and a runners-up medal in the 2017 CAF Confederation Cup. SuperSport chief executive Stanley Matthews described Furman as "one of our all-time great midfielders and captains."

=== Carlisle United ===
On 28 August 2020, Furman returned to English football as he wished to return with his newborn to his parents and his wife's parents in England, joining League Two club Carlisle United on a one-year deal until the end of the 2020/21 campaign. Cumbrians manager Chris Beech said: "He’s such an intelligent footballer, with the ability to dictate a game – his retain and regain of the ball is exceptional ...."

=== Non-league career ===
After a short spell at National League side Altrincham, he signed for Warrington Rylands 1906 in January 2022. Furman played 12 times for Warrington in the 2021–22 season.

== International career ==
Furman received his first international call-up for South Africa for a friendly on 19 August 2008 against Australia. He was an unused substitute in that match. Furman earned his first cap for South Africa in a friendly against Brazil on 8 September 2012. Furman earned his first man of the match award in the country's 2–0 defeat of Mozambique on 11 September 2012.

Furman was selected for the final squad of the 2013 Africa Cup of Nations tournament hosted by his home country. In the second group match of the tournament, the Bafana Bafana convincingly defeated Angola 2–0 and Furman was named as Man of the Match. Furman played the full 90 in South Africa's final group game, a 2–2 draw with Morocco, that secured Bafana Bafana top spot in the group and ensured their first passage to the quarter-finals of the competition since 2002. The quarter-final game against Mali on 2 February ended 1–1 after extra time and Furman had his penalty kick saved by Soumaila Diakité, as Mali won 3–1 in the penalty shoot-out.

Furman was named captain of Bafana Bafana ahead of 2015 Africa Cup of Nations qualifier against Sudan in Durban on 15 November 2014. He replaced former captain Senzo Meyiwa, who died earlier after being shot at his girlfriend's home. He played every minute of the finals in Equatorial Guinea, a group stage exit. He won his 50th cap for South Africa on 24 March 2019 during a 2–1 win over Libya which secured the nation's qualification for the 2019 Africa Cup of Nations. Fans nicknamed him "mlungu" (white person).

As of 2020 he had represented South Africa winning 56 caps, and scoring four goals.

== Personal life ==
Furman is Jewish and of English descent. He said in 2020: "I would love to see more Jewish players.... I hope parents and young Jewish players are looking up to me, Joe Jacobson and Nicky Blackman." He was born in the Camps Bay suburb of the city of Cape Town, South Africa, to South African parents Ronnie and Carol Furman. His family relocated to England when Furman was five years old. He grew up in Edgware in North London, and attended JFS Jewish mixed comprehensive school, where he was a classmate of footballer Josh Kennet, and later lived in Manchester. His younger brother Jake has represented Maccabi GB at two Maccabiah Games, and he hopes to represent Maccabi GB at a future Maccabiah Games alongside his brother. His uncle is former Hellenic left back Marc Reingold.

Furman has a four-year degree in sports science from Manchester Metropolitan University. His wife Natasha (Tash) Howarth is from Manchester, England, and the couple, who married at a synagogue in England in June 2018, has a daughter born in June 2020.

== Career statistics ==
=== International ===
As of matches played on 16 November 2020

South Africa
Year	Apps	Goals
2012	5	0
2013	12	1
2014	7	0
2015	9	1
2016	5	1
2017	6	0
2018	5	0
2019	7	1
2020	2	0
Total	58	4

=== International goals ===
Scores and results list South Africa's goal tally first.

No.	Date	Venue	Opponent	Score	Result	Competition
1	7 September 2013	Moses Mabhida Stadium, Durban, South Africa	Botswana	2–0	4–1	2014 FIFA World Cup qualification
2	14 January 2015	Stade Omar Bongo, Libreville, Gabon	Mali	2–0	3–0	Friendly
3	8 October 2016	Stade du 4 Août, Ouagadougou, Burkina Faso	Burkina Faso	1–0	1–1	2018 FIFA World Cup qualification
4	13 October 2019	Nelson Mandela Bay Stadium, Port Elizabeth, South Africa	Mali	1–0	2–1	Friendly

== Honours ==
Doncaster Rovers

- Football League One: 2012–13

SuperSport United

- Nedbank Cup: 2015–16, 2016–17
- MTN 8 Cup: 2017–18, 2019–20

Warrington Rylands 1906

- Northern Premier League West: 2021–22

In 2013 he was named Maccabi GB Sportsperson of the Year. In 2018 he was appointed as a Laureus Sport for Good Foundation ambassador. In 2019 he received the SAA Voyager Art, Sports, Science and Culture Award. In August 2021 Dean was named club ambassador to Manchester Maccabi Community and Sports club.

== See also ==
- List of select Jewish association football players
