= SAA Supa 8 2005 =

2005 Supa 8
Tournament details
- Date: 13 August 2005 — 17 September 2005
- Teams: 8

Final positions
- Champions: Bloemfontein Celtic (1st title)
- Runners-up: SuperSport United

The SAA Supa 8 2005 was the 31st edition of the competition featuring the top 8-placed teams at the conclusion of the 2004–05 Premier Soccer League season and the 3rd under its then sponsored name, the SAA Supa 8.

It was won by Bloemfontein Celtic, who defeated defending champions SuperSport United in the final, earning Celtic the second major title in their history after the 1985 Mainstay Cup.

The only goal of the final was scored by Rotson Kilambe in 64th minute. Kilambe went on to repeat the feat for Kaizer Chiefs in the 2006 final, scoring in the 62nd minute.

== Teams ==
The following 8 teams are listed according to their final position on the league table in the previous season of the 2004–05 Premier Soccer League.

1. Kaizer Chiefs
2. Orlando Pirates
3. Mamelodi Sundowns
4. SuperSport United
5. Moroka Swallows
6. Ajax Cape Town
7. Silver Stars
8. Bloemfontein Celtic

== Quarter-finals ==
13 August 2005

| Orlando Pirates | 3–0 | Silver Stars |
|---|---|---|
| Mbele 50'; Castner (og); Mutapa 88' |

14 August 2005

| Mamelodi Sundowns | 2–0 | Ajax Cape Town |
|---|---|---|
| Mendu 44'; Ndlovu 50' |

20 August 2005

| Kaizer Chiefs | 1–2 | Bloemfontein Celtic |
|---|---|---|
| Agyemang 1' | | Nkosi 46'; Chabalala 83' |

21 August 2005

| SuperSport United | 3–1 | Moroka Swallows |
|---|---|---|
| Klate 39'; Tsabedze 80'; Ndlela 84' | | Botes 22' |

== Semi–finals ==
27 August 2005

| Orlando Pirates | 1–1 | Bloemfontein Celtic |
|---|---|---|
| Okonkwo 2' | | Batabaire 59' |
Penalties
| | 3–5 |

28 August 2005

| Mamelodi Sundowns | 0–1 | SuperSport United |
|---|---|---|
| | | Mere (og) 97' |

== Final ==
17 September 2005

| Bloemfontein Celtic | 1–0 | Supersport United |
|---|---|---|
| Kilambe 64' |

Olen Park, Potchefstroom
