= 2018 MTN 8 =

Tournament details
- Country: South Africa
- Teams: 8

Final positions
- Champions: Cape Town City
- Runners-up: SuperSport United

Tournament statistics
- Matches played: 9

The 2018 MTN 8 was the 44th edition of South Africa's annual soccer cup competition, the MTN 8. It featured the top eight teams of the Premier Soccer League at the end of the 2017-18 season.

== Teams ==
The eight teams that competed in the MTN 8 knockout competition are (listed according to their finishing position in the 2017/2018 Premier Soccer League Season):

1. Mamelodi Sundowns
2. Orlando Pirates
3. Kaizer Chiefs
4. Maritzburg United
5. Cape Town City
6. Free State Stars
7. SuperSport United
8. Golden Arrows

=== Quarter-finals ===
11 August 2018
20h30

Orlando Pirates	2–2	Supersport United
14' Mulenga; 52' Shitolo		32' Furman; 49' Rusike
Penalties
	3–4

Orlando Stadium, Johannesburg
11 August 2018
18h00

Kaizer Chiefs	3–0	Free State Stars
20' Zuma; 47' Castro; 90+12' Billiat

FNB Stadium, Johannesburg
11 August 2018
15h00

Mamelodi Sundowns	2–0	Golden Arrows
40' Vilakazi; 70' Arendse

Lucas Moripe Stadium, Pretoria
12 August 2018
15h00

Maritzburg United	0–1	Cape Town City
		(~44) Cupido

Harry Gwala Stadium, Pietermaritzburg

=== Semi-finals ===
==== 1st leg ====
25 August 2018
15h00

Cape Town City	1–0	Mamelodi Sundowns
75' Fielies

Cape Town Stadium, Cape Town
26 August 2018
15h00

Supersport United	2–2	Kaizer Chiefs
24' Grobler; 38' Grobler		19' Billiat; 46' Castro

Lucas Moripe Stadium, Pretoria

==== 2nd leg ====
1 September 2018
20h15

Kaizer Chiefs	0–1	Supersport United
		57' Grobler

FNB Stadium, Johannesburg
2 September 2018
15h00

Mamelodi Sundowns	1–0	Cape Town City
25' Silva
Penalties
	2-4

Lucas Moripe Stadium, Pretoria

==== Final ====
29 September 2018
19h00

Supersport United	0–0	Cape Town City
Penalties
	1-4

Moses Mabhida Stadium, Durban
