= SAA Supa 8 2006 =

2006 Supa 8
Tournament details
- Date: 12 August 2006 — 21 October 2006
- Teams: 8

Final positions
- Champions: Kaizer Chiefs (13th title)
- Runners-up: SuperSport United

Tournament statistics
- Matches played: 7
- Goals scored: 18 (2.57 per match)

The SAA Supa 8 2006 was the 32nd edition of the competition featuring the top 8-placed teams at the conclusion of the 2004–05 Premier Soccer League season and the 4th under its then sponsored name, the SAA Supa 8.

It was won by Kaizer Chiefs, who defeated Golden Arrows in the quarter-final, Moroka Swallows in the semi-final, and Supersport United in the final.

Rotson Kilambe, who scored the winner and only goal of the game for Bloemfontein Celtic in the 2005 final, repeated the feat for Chiefs, scoring in the 62nd minute.

== Teams ==
The following 8 teams are listed according to their final position on the league table in the previous season of the 2005–06 Premier Soccer League.

1. Mamelodi Sundowns
2. Orlando Pirates
3. Kaizer Chiefs
4. Moroka Swallows
5. Silver Stars
6. Golden Arrows
7. SuperSport United
8. Santos

== Quarter-finals ==
12 August 2006

Kaizer Chiefs	2–0	Golden Arrows
Nkosi 4'; Obua 55'

FNB Stadium, Johannesburg
13 August 2006

Mamelodi Sundowns	4–1	Santos
Torrealba 15'; Ntwagae 18'; Chabangu 38'; Nyandoro 63'		Rogers 52'

19 August 2006

SuperSport United	1–1	Orlando Pirates
Tsabedze 120+1'		Vilakazi 120'
Penalties
	7–6

20 August 2006

Moroka Swallows	2–1	Silver Stars
Niang 16'; Oersen 63'		Jackson 85'

== Semi–finals ==
23 September 2006

SuperSport United	2–0	Mamelodi Sundowns
Mashego 55'; Phiri 59'

12 August 2006

Kaizer Chiefs	2–1	Moroka Swallows
Ngobese 40'; Schalkwyk 103'		Fransman 60'

== Final ==
21 October 2006

Kaizer Chiefs	1–0	Supersport United
Kilambe 62'

Kings Park Stadium, Durban
