= 2002 BP Top 8 =

Tournament details
- Date: 10 August to 14 September 2002
- Teams: 8

Final positions
- Champions: Santos (1st title)
- Runners-up: Mamelodi Sundowns

The BP Top 8 2002 was the 28th edition of the competition featuring the top 8-placed teams at the conclusion of the Premiership season and the last under its then sponsored name, the BP Top 8.

It was won for the first time by Santos, who defeated Mamelodi Sundowns 2–0 in the final. Santos had won the Premiership for the first time the previous season.

== Teams ==
The following 8 teams are listed according to their final position on the league table in the previous season of the Premiership.

1. Santos
2. SuperSport United
3. Orlando Pirates
4. Jomo Cosmos
5. Mamelodi Sundowns
6. Moroka Swallows
7. Wits University
8. Kaizer Chiefs
9. Lamontville Golden Arrows
10. Black Leopards

== Final ==
14 September 2002

Santos	2–0	Mamelodi Sundowns

Royal Bafokeng Sports Palace, Rustenburg
