= SAA Supa 8 2003 =

2003 Supa 8
Tournament details
- Date: 9 August to 21 September 2003
- Teams: 8

Final positions
- Champions: Jomo Cosmos (1st title)
- Runners-up: Moroka Swallows

The SAA Supa 8 2003 was the 29th edition of the competition featuring the top 8-placed teams at the conclusion of the Premiership season and the 1st under its then sponsored name, the SAA Supa 8.

It was won by Jomo Cosmos, who defeated Moroka Swallows in the final.

== Teams ==
The following 8 teams are listed according to their final position on the league table in the previous season of the Premiership.

1. Orlando Pirates
2. SuperSport United
3. Wits University
4. Moroka Swallows
5. Kaizer Chiefs
6. Lamontville Golden Arrows
7. Dynamos
8. Jomo Cosmos

== Final ==
2 October 2004

Jomo Cosmos	3–2	Moroka Swallows

Kings Park Stadium, Durban
