= Godfrey Sapula =

South African former soccer player and coach

Personal information
- Full name: Godfrey Zolile Sapula
- Date of birth: 7 November 1973 (age 52)
- Place of birth: Soweto, Gauteng, South Africa
- Height: 1.69 m (5 ft 7 in)
- Position: Midfielder

Team information
- Current team: Mamelodi Sundowns Ladies (head coach)

Senior career*
Years	Team	Apps	(Gls)
1993–1998	Jomo Cosmos	110	(6)
1998	Colo-Colo	0	(0)
1998–1999	Jomo Cosmos	30	(1)
1999–2000	Ankaragücü	2	(0)
2000–2002	Orlando Pirates	48	(2)
2002–2008	Mamelodi Sundowns	124	(21)
2008–2010	Platinum Stars	25	(3)

International career
1999–2007	South Africa	24	(1)

Managerial career
- 2017–2022: Mamelodi Sundowns Academy
- 2022–2024: M Tigers F.C.
- 2025–: Mamelodi Sundowns Ladies
- * Club domestic league appearances and goals

Godfrey Zolile Sapula (born 7 November 1973) is a former South African soccer player and coach who played as a midfielder. He is the current coach of the SAFA Women's League side Mamelodi Sundowns Ladies.

He was named the PSL player of the season in 2006 and player's player of the season in 2007. He was named the 2025 SAFA Women's League coach of the season.

== Club career ==
He played for Premier Soccer League clubs Jomo Cosmos, Orlando Pirates, Mamelodi Sundowns and Platinum Stars, Chilean club Colo-Colo, Turkish club Ankaragücü and the South African national team.

== Managerial career ==
In 2023 he got his CAF A license. He is a former Sundowns Academy coach.

Mamelodi Sundowns Ladies

In 2025 he was appointed Sundowns Ladies coach. He won his first league title with the team in the 2025 season and was voted coach of the season at the 2025 SAFA Women's League awards. He won his first regional title with the club at the 2026 COSAFA Women's Champions League where he was named the coach of the tournament.

== Honours ==
Player

Colo-Colo
Primera División de Chile
1998
Mamelodi Sundowns
South African Premiership
2005–06, 2006–07
MTN 8
2007
Managerial

Mamelodi Sundowns Ladies

- COSAFA Women's Champions League: 2026
- SAFA Women's League: 2025

Individual

- PSL player of the season: 2006
- PSL player's player of the season: 2007
- 2025 SAFA Women's League: Coach of the season
- 2026 COSAFA Women's Champions League: Coach of the tournament
