= SAA Supa 8 2004 =

2004 Supa 8
Tournament details
- Date: 14 August 2004 — 2 October 2004
- Teams: 8

Final positions
- Champions: SuperSport United (1st title)
- Runners-up: Kaizer Chiefs

The SAA Supa 8 2004 was the 30th edition of the competition featuring the top 8-placed teams at the conclusion of the 2003–04 Premier Soccer League season and the 2nd under its then sponsored name, the SAA Supa 8.

It was won by SuperSport United, who defeated Kaizer Chiefs in the final, earning SuperSport their first Top 8 win.

== Teams ==
The following 8 teams are listed according to their final position on the league table in the previous season of the 2003–04 Premier Soccer League.

1. Kaizer Chiefs
2. Ajax Cape Town
3. SuperSport United
4. Wits University
5. Orlando Pirates
6. Santos
7. Moroka Swallows
8. Black Leopards

== Final ==
2 October 2004

| Kaizer Chiefs | 0–1 | Supersport United |
|---|---|---|
| Evans 47' |

ABSA Stadium, Durban
