= Khama Billiat =

Zimbabwean footballer (born 1980)

Personal information
- Full name: Khama Billiat
- Date of birth: 19 August 1990 (age 36)
- Place of birth: Harare, Zimbabwe
- Height: 1.70 m (5 ft 7 in)
- Position: Winger

Team information
- Current team: Scottland

Youth career
- Aces Youth Soccer Academy

Senior career*
Years	Team	Apps	(Gls)
2010	CAPS United	5	(2)
2010–2013	Ajax Cape Town	88	(29)
2013–2018	Mamelodi Sundowns	112	(52)
2018–2023	Kaizer Chiefs	92	(35)
2024–2025	Yadah Stars	21	(13)
2025–	Scottland	0	(0)

International career^{‡}
2011–	Zimbabwe	54	(18)
Medal record
Men's football
Representing Zimbabwe
COSAFA Cup
Winner	2018 South Africa
Third place	2019 South Africa
- * Club domestic league appearances and goals as of 14:46, 30 September 2020 (UTC) ‡ National team caps and goals as of 10 October 2024

Khama Billiat (born 19 August 1990) is a Zimbabwean professional footballer who plays as a winger for Scottland.

== Club career ==
=== CAPS United FC ===
Billiat first played for CAPS United under coach Lloyd Chitembwe in 2010. He featured for only 15 minutes at Rufaro Stadium, before migrating to South Africa. His stint at the Harare giants, lasted three months.

=== Ajax Cape Town ===
Billiat made his professional debut for Ajax Cape Town on 20 August 2010 against Mamelodi Sundowns, winning (4–3) on penalties after a 1–1 draw, in a quarterfinal match of the 2010 MTN 8 tournament at Athlone Stadium in Cape Town. He was acquired by Ajax Cape Town in the summer of 2010 as a transfer from Zimbabwean club CAPS United, only three months after the club had recruited him from Aces Youth Soccer Academy in Harare. Billiat was joined at Ajax CT by CAPS club mate Grándsunny JR, who had also transferred to the Cape club.

On 21 July 2012, in a friendly encounter during the off season, Ajax Cape Town held the visiting Manchester United to a 1–1 draw in which Billiat received high praise from Manchester United defender Rio Ferdinand. Ferdinand labelled the young attacking midfielder as an agile and exciting player to watch, with great speed and ball control. His performance's for Ajax Cape Town earned him a move to Mamelodi Sundowns.

=== Mamelodi Sundowns ===
After a trial with Lokomotiv Moscow in July 2013, Billiat joined Mamelodi Sundowns on 19 August 2013 on a five-year contract. He made his Sundowns debut on 28 August in a 1–1 draw versus Platinum Stars, while his first goal for the club came almost a month later in a 2–1 home victory against Bidvest Wits.

In 2016, he helped Mamelodi Sundowns claim their first ever continental title and becoming only the second South African team to be crowned champions of Africa. On 21 November 2017, Billiat scored a brace against Bidvest Wits.

=== Kaizer Chiefs ===
In June 2018, it was announced that Billiat was moving from Mamelodi Sundowns to Kaizer, few days later it was announced that Billiat had signed for Kaizer Chiefs on a three-year deal. He made his competitive debut for the club on 4 August 2018 in a 1–1 league draw with his former club, Mamelodi Sundowns.

=== Yadah Stars ===
Khama signed for Yadah Stars on a free transfer.

== International career ==
Billiat has represented Zimbabwe on various youth levels. Since then, he has seen several appearances with the Zimbabwe national team during the 2012 Africa Cup of Nations qualifying matches and various friendly matches scheduled, becoming a regular starter in the attacking midfield for the Warriors. His senior debut came in a 2012 Africa Cup of Nations qualifier against Mali on 26 March 2011. Later that year, in August, Billiat scored his first goal for Zimbabwe in a friendly match versus Zambia. Billiat also played for the Zimbabwean national team at the 2017 edition of the African Cup of Nations.

In November 2021, Billiat was named captain of Zimbabwe against South Africa in 2022 FIFA World Cup qualification. And he retired from international football after his last match against Ethiopia in the FIFA world cup qualifiers 2022.

In August 2024 Billiat announced that he no longer retired, and was available again for selection for the Zimbabwe national soccer team.

== Career statistics ==
=== Club ===
As of 18 June 2016

Appearances and goals by club, season and competition
Club	Season	League			National cup (Note: Includes Nedbank Cup.)		Africa (Note: Includes CAF Champions League, CAF Confederation Cup and CAF Super Cup)		Other (Note: Includes Telkom Knockout and MTN 8)		Total	
Club	Season	Division	Apps	Goals	Apps	Goals	Apps	Goals	Apps	Goals	Apps	Goals
Ajax Cape Town	2010–11	Premier Soccer League	27	9	0	0	—		3	0	30	9
Ajax Cape Town	2011–12	Premier Soccer League	26	8	0	0	—		5	3	31	11
Ajax Cape Town	2012–13	Premier Soccer League	30	4	1	0	—		1	0	32	4
Ajax Cape Town	Total		83	21	1	0	0	0	9	3	93	24
Mamelodi Sundowns	2013–14	Premier Soccer League	16	4	2	0	–		2	2	20	6
Mamelodi Sundowns	2014–15	Premier Soccer League	21	7	5	1	–		2	0	28	8
Mamelodi Sundowns	2015–16	Premier Soccer League	26	12	3	0	–		4	0	33	14
Mamelodi Sundowns	Total		63	23	10	1	0	0	8	2	81	26
Career total			146	44	11	1	0	0	17	5	174	50

=== International ===
As of 10 October 2024

Appearances and goals by national team and year
National team	Year	Apps	Goals
Zimbabwe	2011	6	2
Zimbabwe	2012	5	1
Zimbabwe	2013	4	1
Zimbabwe	2014	0	0
Zimbabwe	2015	2	1
Zimbabwe	2016	5	2
Zimbabwe	2017	4	0
Zimbabwe	2018	7	4
Zimbabwe	2019	10	6
Zimbabwe	2020	3	0
Zimbabwe	2021	5	0
Zimbabwe	2024	3	1
Total		54	18

Scores and results list Zimbabwe's goal tally first, score column indicates score after each Billiat goal.

List of international goals scored by Khama Billiat
No.	Date	Venue	Opponent	Score	Result	Competition
1	10 August 2011	Rufaro Stadium, Harare, Zimbabwe	Zambia	2–0	2–0	Friendly
2	4 September 2011	Rufaro Stadium, Harare, Zimbabwe	Liberia	2–0	3–0	2012 Africa Cup of Nations qualification
3	9 September 2012	Rufaro Stadium, Harare, Zimbabwe	Angola	2–0	3–1	2013 Africa Cup of Nations qualification
4	6 February 2013	Rufaro Stadium, Harare, Zimbabwe	Botswana	1–1	2–1	Friendly
5	13 June 2015	Kamuzu Stadium, Blantyre, Malawi	Malawi	2–1	2–1	2017 Africa Cup of Nations qualification
6	29 March 2016	National Sports Stadium, Harare, Zimbabwe	Swaziland	4–0	4–0	2017 Africa Cup of Nations qualification
7	5 June 2016	National Sports Stadium, Harare, Zimbabwe	Malawi	2–0	3–0	2017 Africa Cup of Nations qualification
8	9 June 2018	Peter Mokaba Stadium, Polokwane, South Africa	Zambia	3–2	4–2 (a.e.t.)	2018 COSAFA Cup
9	9 June 2018	Peter Mokaba Stadium, Polokwane, South Africa	Zambia	4–2	4–2 (a.e.t.)	2018 COSAFA Cup
10	9 September 2018	Stade Alphonse Massemba-Débat, Brazzaville, Republic of the Congo	Congo	1–0	1–1	2019 Africa Cup of Nations qualification
11	16 October 2018	National Sports Stadium, Harare, Zimbabwe	DR Congo	1–0	1–1	2019 Africa Cup of Nations qualification
12	24 March 2019	National Sports Stadium, Harare, Zimbabwe	Congo	1–0	2–0	2019 Africa Cup of Nations qualification
13	1 June 2019	Princess Magogo Stadium, KwaMashu, South Africa	Comoros	2–0	2–0	2019 COSAFA Cup
14	26 June 2019	Cairo International Stadium, Cairo, Egypt	Uganda	1–1	1–1	2019 Africa Cup of Nations
15	10 September 2019	National Sports Stadium, Harare, Zimbabwe	Somalia	3–1	3–1	2022 FIFA World Cup qualification
16	19 November 2019	National Heroes Stadium, Lusaka, Zambia	Zambia	1–0	2–1	2021 Africa Cup of Nations qualification
17	19 November 2019	National Heroes Stadium, Lusaka, Zambia	Zambia	2–1	2–1	2021 Africa Cup of Nations qualification
18	10 October 2024	Orlando Stadium, Johannesburg, South Africa	Namibia	1–0	1–0	2025 Africa Cup of Nations qualification

== Honours ==
Mamelodi Sundowns

- Premier Soccer League: 2013–14, 2015–162017–18
- Nedbank Cup: 2014–15
- Telkom Knockout: 2015
- CAF Champions League: 2016
- CAF Super Cup: 2017

Zimbabwe

- COSAFA Cup: 2018; 3rd place, 2019

Individual

- PSL Player of the Season: 2016
- PSL Players' Player of the Season: 2016
- PSL Midfielder of the Season: 2016
