= Senzo Meyiwa =

South African footballer (1984–2014)

- Meyiwa with South Africa in 2014

Personal information
- Full name: Senzo Robert Meyiwa
- Date of birth: 24 January 1984
- Place of birth: Durban, South Africa
- Date of death: 26 October 2014 (aged 30)
- Place of death: Vosloorus, South Africa
- Height: 1.75 m (5 ft 9 in)
- Position: Goalkeeper

Youth career
- London Cosmos (South Africa)
- 2002–2005: Orlando Pirates

Senior career*
Years	Team	Apps	(Gls)
2005–2014	Orlando Pirates	109	(0)

International career
2013–2014	South Africa	7	(0)
- * Club domestic league appearances and goals

Senzo Robert Meyiwa (24 January 1984 – 26 October 2014) was a South African professional soccer player who played as a goalkeeper for and captained both Orlando Pirates in the Premier Soccer League, and the South Africa national team.

He was shot and killed in a home invasion on 26 October 2014.

== Club career ==
=== Orlando Pirates ===
==== Beginnings (2005–2012) ====
Meyiwa was a goalkeeper of Orlando Pirates from 2005 as the backup goalkeeper to Francis Chansa until 2008. The arrival of new coach Milutin Sredojević, the Pirates gave Meyiwa his debut against AmaZulu F.C. on 8 November 2006, in a match which the Pirates won 2-1. In 2008, after the departure of Francis Chansa to Engen Santos, Pirates brought Moeneeb Josephs from Wits University in 2008 and Meyiwa again had to be the backup goalkeeper.

==== Becoming a starter (2012–2014) ====
In the 2012 season, interim coach Augusto Palacios gave Meyiwa some games, and the new coach of Pirates Roger De Sa also gave Meyiwa games due to Josephs' shoulder injury in the 2012 season.

Josephs left Pirates in 2013 to Bidvest Wits, after seeing that he was no longer the first-choice goalkeeper. Pirates brought Ghanaian goalkeeper Fatau Dauda in 2013 season, but Meyiwa continued to start and Dauda played only 3 games for Pirates before leaving to Chippa United in 2014.

Meyiwa is known for saving penalties in the CAF Champions League 2013 against TP Mazembe, when he saved two penalties which were both taken by Tresor Mputu. Though Pirates lost 1-0 in that match, they won on an aggregate of 3–2.

Meyiwa guided Pirates to the final against Al Ahly SC, which Pirates lost 3-1 on aggregate.

==== Captaincy (2014) ====
Meyiwa was made captain of Orlando Pirates by coach Vladimir Vermezovic in his last four games for Pirates before his death after then club captain Lucky Lekgwathi was not playing and he was also made captain of Bafana Bafana by coach Shakes Mashaba in his last four games of 2015 Africa Cup of Nations qualification. He played his last match of his lifetime on 25 October 2014, in a 4-1 win over Ajax Cape Town in the Carling Knockout Cup.

== International career ==
Meyiwa made his debut for South Africa on 2 June 2013 in a 2–0 away victory against Lesotho as a substitute for the whole second half to Wayne Sandilands. He was included in the South African squad led by manager Gordon Igesund for the 2013 Africa Cup of Nations, but made no appearances. For the 2015 Africa Cup of Nations qualification, he played four times, with his last match being a 0–0 draw against Congo on 15 October 2014 at Peter Mokaba Stadium in Polokwane.

He was given a captain's armband in all of his last four games that which he played in 2015 Africa Cup of Nations qualification and he joined Brian Baloyi and Moeneeb Josephs by being the only goalkeepers who captained Bafana in four occasions each without conceding a goal during their captaincy, with two draws and two wins each of them. He earned a total of seven international caps with six clean sheets.

== Death ==
On 26 October 2014, Meyiwa was shot and killed in a robbery at his girlfriend Kelly Khumalo's house in Vosloorus. He was pronounced dead on arrival at the hospital in Johannesburg. Three people were believed to have been involved in the shooting, and police released composite images of two suspects. One suspect, Zamokuhle Mbatha, was arrested on 31 October 2014 and appeared in court, but he was freed on 11 November 2014 due to lack of evidence. Meyiwa's death sparked outrage over the country's high crime and murder rates.

As a mark of respect, the Soweto derby between Orlando Pirates and Kaizer Chiefs, due to be played on 1 November 2014, was postponed. President Jacob Zuma mourned the loss and called for Meyiwa's killers to be found. Former FIFA president Sepp Blatter called Meyiwa's death a "senseless, tragic loss." Spain goalkeeper Iker Casillas posted a picture on Instagram of Meyiwa holding Casillas' Real Madrid jersey that was exchanged when Spain played South Africa in an international friendly.

He was given a state funeral which took place in Durban, at Moses Mabhida Stadium on 1 November, his funeral was attended by his fans and friends, multitude of football fans, his football club colleagues, football officials and politician dignitaries included Premier Soccer League and Orlando Pirates chairman Irvin Khoza, Kaizer Chiefs chairman Kaizer Motaung, Mamelodi Sundowns owner Patrice Motsepe, SAFA President Danny Jordaan, General Bantu Holomisa, Bheki Cele, Former Premiers of KwaZulu-Natal S'bu Ndebele, Zweli Mkhize who was also the program director of the funeral, Minister of Sport and Recreation Fikile Mbalula, Premier of KwaZulu-Natal Senzo Mchunu, Minister in the Presidency Jeff Radebe who made a eulogy for Meyiwa.

Meyiwa was laid to rest in Chesterville, KwaZulu-Natal. During the funeral at Moses Mabhida Stadium, his father, Samuel, was photographed greeting the crowd in attendance by leaning out his car window with his arms outstretched, which sparked an internet trend.

In October 2020, five men were charged with murdering Meyiwa. The suspects denied that they were involved in the killing.

== Age controversy ==
In November 2014, it was reported that Meyiwa had apparently lied about his real age throughout his professional career. According to his tombstone and the school register, he was born on 24 January 1984, not 24 September 1987; making him 30 years old, and not 27 at the time of his death.

== Honors ==
Orlando Pirates

- Premier Soccer League: 2010–11, 2011–12
- Nedbank Cup: 2010–11, 2013–14
- MTN 8: 2010, 2011
- Telkom Knockout: 2011
- CAF Champions League runner-up: 2013
