= Simphiwe Selepe =

South African midfielder

Personal information
- Full name: Simphiwe Selepe
- Date of birth: 19 February 2005 (age 21)
- Place of birth: Tsakane, Gauteng, South Africa
- Position: Midfielder

Team information
- Current team: Orlando Pirates
- Number: 47

Youth career
- Orlando Pirates

Senior career*
Years	Team	Apps	(Gls)
2025–	Orlando Pirates	9	(1)

International career
2025	South Africa	2	(0)
- * Club domestic league appearances and goals as of 3 January 2026

Simphiwe Selepe (born 19 February 2005) is a South African professional soccer player who plays as a midfielder for South African Premier Division club Orlando Pirates.

== Club career ==
Selepe was promoted from the Orlando Pirates academy to the first-team in December 2024, featuring in the Carling All Stars team.

He had his full debut in 2025.

He received a Man of the Match award at the 2025–2026 Betway Premiership final after being out for much of the season due to an unnamed injury.

== International career ==
He has represented South Africa at senior level.

== Career statistics ==
As of 22 August 2026

Appearances and goals by club, season and competition
Club	Season	League			National cup (Note: Includes Nedbank Cup)		League cup (Note: Includes MTN 8, Carling Knockout)		Continental		Total	
Club	Season	Division	Apps	Goals	Apps	Goals	Apps	Goals	Apps	Goals	Apps	Goals
Orlando Pirates	2024–25	Premiership	7	0	2	0	3	0	2	0	22	0
Orlando Pirates	2025–26	Premiership	2	1	1	0	2	0	4	0	16	1
Orlando Pirates	Total		9	1	3	0	5	0	6	0	23	1
Career total			9	1	3	0	5	0	6	0	23	1

== Honours ==
Orlando Pirates

- Betway Premiership: 2025–26
- MTN 8: 2025–26
- Carling Knockout: 2025
