= Bradley Grobler =

South African soccer player (born 1988)

Personal information
- Full name: Bradley Allan Grobler
- Date of birth: 25 January 1988 (age 38)
- Place of birth: Johannesburg, South Africa
- Height: 1.78 m (5 ft 10 in)
- Position: Striker

Team information
- Current team: Stellenbosch FC
- Number: 17

Youth career
- BK Callies
- Boksburg FC
- Platinum Stars

Senior career*
Years	Team	Apps	(Gls)
2007–2011	Platinum Stars	66	(20)
2011–2012	Göztepe	28	(6)
2012–2013	Ajax Cape Town	12	(3)
2013–2025	SuperSport United	220	(71)
2025-2026	Sekhukhune United	20	(8)
2026-	Stellenbosch FC	2	(0)

International career^{‡}
2011–2019	South Africa	12	(2)
- * Club domestic league appearances and goals as of 4 January 2026 ‡ National team caps and goals as of 18 April 2023

Bradley Allan Grobler (born 25 January 1988) is a South African soccer player who plays as a striker for Premiership club Stellenbosch FC.

== Club career ==
Grobler attended Benoni High School and plied his trade as a junior at both Boksburg FC and BK Callies just outside Johannesburg. As a junior Grobler was predominately coached by his father, Les Grobler, who also had a stellar career in the PSL.

Bradley started his professional football career at Platinum Stars. After a four-year stint at Stars, he moved to Turkish second division side Göztepe A.Ş. on 26 August 2011. He was then Göztepe's most expensive signing ever.

On 26 June 2012, Grobler joined Premiership side Ajax Cape Town on a four-year deal.. He currently plays for Stellenbosch FC and is lying second in the PSL all-time top goalscorers with 130 goals.

He has scored over 8 goals against Orlando Pirates, while at Supersport United.

== International career ==
Grobler scored on his international debut against Zimbabwe on 15 November 2011.

=== International goals ===
#	Date	Venue	Opponent	Score	Result	Competition
1.	15 November 2011	Harare, Zimbabwe	Zimbabwe	1–0	1–2	Friendly match
2.	15 November 2016	Maputo, Mozambique	Mozambique	1–1	1–1	Friendly match

== Personal life ==
Born in Sandton, Grobler is the son of former Moroka Swallows player Les Grobler.

== Honours ==
=== Club ===
SuperSport United

- Nedbank Cup: 2015–16, 2016–2017
- MTN 8: 2017, 2019
- Telkom Knockout Cup : 2014

Individual

Lesley Manyathela Golden Boot : 2020-21
