= 2006 ABSA Cup =

Tournament details
- Country: South Africa

Final positions
- Champions: Kaizer Chiefs (12th title)

The 2006 ABSA Cup was the 2006 season of the South African club football (soccer) knockout tournament, known at the time under its sponsored name, the ABSA Cup.

It was won by Kaizer Chiefs, who defeated Orlando Pirates on penalties after a goalless draw in normal time. This was the first Soweto derby final since 1988.

== Results ==
=== Semi-finals ===
29 April 2006

Mamelodi Sundowns	0–0	Kaizer Chiefs
Penalties
	1–2

30 April 2006

Orlando Pirates	2–1	Tembisa Classic
Mathe 1'; Chabalala 55'		Cashibe 59'

=== Final ===
The choice of venue for the final was controversial, with the smaller Kings Park Stadium in Durban (known at the time as the ABSA Stadium) chosen over the larger FNB Stadium in Johannesburg, although it is believed that the sponsorship of that stadium by a rival bank to played a role.

20 May 2006

Kaizer Chiefs	0–0	Orlando Pirates
Penalties
	5–3

Kings Park Stadium, Durban
