= 1996 BP Top 8 =

Tournament details
- Teams: 8

Final positions
- Champions: Orlando Pirates (6th title)
- Runners-up: Qwa Qwa Stars

The BP Top 8 1996 was the 25th edition of the competition, then known as the BP Top 8 for sponsorship reasons, featuring the top 8-placed teams at the conclusion of the National Soccer League season.

It was won for the sixth time by Orlando Pirates, who defeated Qwa Qwa Stars in a replayed final, after the first game finished 1–1.

The competition was not held again until 2000 after the newly-formed Premier Soccer League removed it from the calendar due to overcrowding.

== Teams ==
The following 8 teams are listed according to their final position on the league table in the 1995 NSL.

1. Cape Town Spurs
2. Mamelodi Sundowns
3. Orlando Pirates
4. Kaizer Chiefs
5. Hellenic
6. Bush Bucks
7. Vaal Professionals
8. Qwa Qwa Stars

== Final ==
| Orlando Pirates | 1–1 | Qwa Qwa Stars |

| Orlando Pirates | 3–0 | Qwa Qwa Stars |
|---|---|---|
| Sikhosana, Sebola, Mkhalele |
