= Teko Modise =

South African footballer (born 1982)

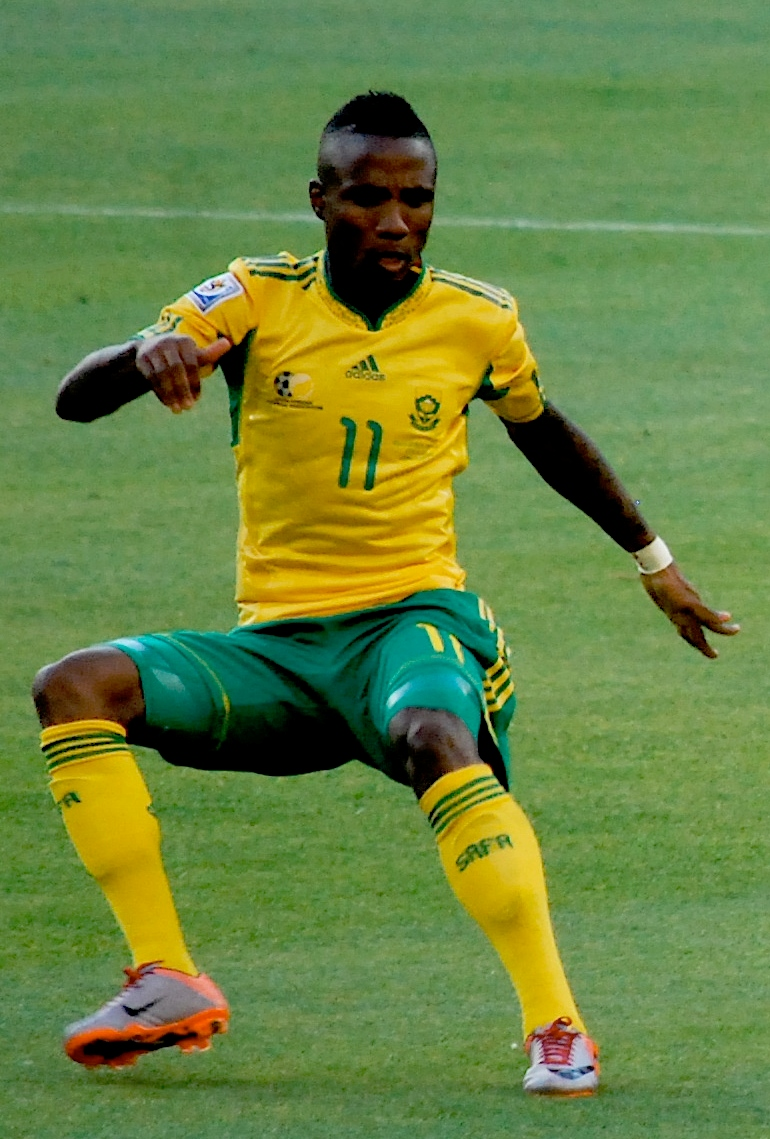
- Modise playing with South Africa at the 2010 FIFA World Cup

Personal information
- Full name: Teko Tsholofelo Modise
- Date of birth: 22 December 1982 (age 43)
- Place of birth: Meadowlands, South Africa
- Height: 1.69 m (5 ft 7 in)
- Position: Midfielder

Team information
- Current team: Cape Town City (staff)

Youth career
- Coventry (South Africa)
- City Rebels
- Ria Stars

Senior career*
| Years | Team | Apps | (Gls) |
| 2001–2002 | Ria Stars | 6 | (0) |
| 2002–2006 | City Pillars | 66 | (5) |
| 2006–2007 | SuperSport United | 33 | (8) |
| 2007–2011 | Orlando Pirates | 93 | (15) |
| 2011–2017 | Mamelodi Sundowns | 145 | (29) |
| 2017–2019 | Cape Town City | 20 | (1) |
| Total | | 363 | (58) |

International career
| 2007–2012 | South Africa | 66 | (10) |
- * Club domestic league appearances and goals

Teko Tsholofelo Modise (born 22 December 1982), nicknamed the General, the Navigator and Techno M, is a South African retired professional footballer, former Bafana Bafana captain who played as a midfielder and who is currently a staff member at Cape Town City Football Club.

Widely regarded as one of the greatest PSL players of all time, Modise's career began in the lower leagues of South African football with Ria Stars and City Pillars. During his time with the latter, he won the Mvela Golden League Player of the Season award, which earned him a move to top-flight side SuperSport United in 2006. The following season he joined local rivals Orlando Pirates with whom he spent six years, winning two PSL Footballer of the Year awards, including the inaugural award, and two club honors. Whilst at Pirates, he earned the nickname "the General" for his ability to direct play and soon became a regular within the national team set-up.

Following a falling-out with club management in 2011, he transferred to Mamelodi Sundowns where he spent a further six years and won no fewer than five club titles. He also captained the side for the 2012–13 season. In 2017, he chose not to renew his contract with the club, electing instead to sign for Cape Town City where he remained until his retirement in 2019.

Modise also made 66 appearances for the South Africa national team between 2007 and 2012, and represented the nation at the 2008 Africa Cup of Nations, 2009 FIFA Confederations Cup, and 2010 FIFA World Cup tournaments.

== Early life ==
Modise was born in Meadowlands, South Africa. He is the youngest of three siblings and was raised by his mother in Diepkloof, Soweto. He was introduced to football as a toddler through his father who was a Kaizer Chiefs supporter, but lost contact with him when he was ten years old. During his formative years that followed, he played for local amateur sides Coventry and City Rebels before joining Ria Stars at the age of seventeen.

== Club career ==
=== Ria Stars ===
Modise signed for Ria Stars in 1999 after being scouted by former Orlando Pirates and Kaizer Chiefs defender, Steve Mnguni. He made his PSL debut two years later in a 1–1 draw with Bidvest Wits on 2 September 2001. It was his only professional campaign with Ria Stars, however, as at the end of the season the club became defunct after being bought out for R8m by the PSL.

=== City Pillars ===
Following the termination of his contract with Ria Stars, Modise signed for Mvela Golden League side City Pillars. He made over 60 league appearances for the club between 2002 and 2006, during which time he scored regularly, and won the league's Player of the Season award in May 2006. Modise also helped the club to a last-16 finish in the Nedbank Cup where they were ultimately eliminated by Kaizer Chiefs despite him scoring a brace.

=== Supersport United ===
In August 2006, he returned to the PSL when he signed for SuperSport United, managed at the time by Bafana Bafana assistant coach Pitso Mosimane. He spent a solitary season with the club before signing for rivals Orlando Pirates in 2007.

=== Orlando Pirates ===
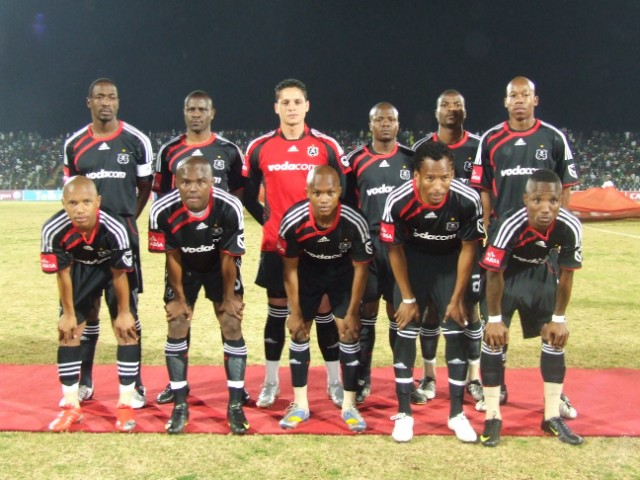
Teko Modise (bottom right) with Orlando Pirates

Modise signed a three-year contract with Orlando Pirates and in his debut season won the inaugural PSL Footballer of the Year award and was also named SAFA Footballer of the Year. The following season, he led Pirates to a runners-up finish in the league, losing out on goal difference to SuperSport United, and in the Telkom Knockout. His form during the course of the season saw him retain the PSL Footballer of the Year and SAFA Footballer of the Year awards and also earned him the Player's Player of the Season title.

Modise's local success caught the attention of a number of foreign clubs and in the off-season he was linked with a move to Premier League sides Aston Villa, Man City and Wigan. Modise had no buyout clause in his contract, however, and the club refused to sell him, resulting in his relationship with coach Ruud Krol and chairman Irvin Khoza souring in the two years that followed. He was suspended for boycotting training in 2011, later revealing that he had done so because of the way the club had treated him.

=== Mamelodi Sundowns ===
Following Pirates' decision to discipline Modise, speculation was rife that he would leave the club, and on 27 January 2011 he signed for rivals Mamelodi Sundowns. Following Sundowns' appointment of Pitso Mosimane as head coach, Modise was named club-captain in his second season at the club. He was stripped of the armband for the following campaign in favour of Alje Schut but helped the team to the 2013-14 Premier Soccer League trophy, scoring in a 3–0 win over SuperSport United on 8 May 2014 to secure the title.

At the end of the 2014–15 season, in which he made 32 appearances across all competitions and scored eight times, he was named Nedbank Cup Player of the Tournament and PSL Midfielder of the Season. Modise ultimately amassed over 150 appearances across all competitions for the club and in his final season was part of the squad which won CAF Champions League, after a 3–1 aggregate win over Egyptian side Zamalek.

On 27 June 2017, he was released from his contract by Mamelodi Sundowns. During his time with the club, in which he earned a reported R450 000 per month, he won no fewer than six trophies, including two PSL titles, the Nedbank Cup, Telkom Knockout, CAF Champions League and CAF Super Cup.

=== Cape Town City ===
Having been a free agent for less than a month, Modise signed for fellow PSL side Cape Town City on 12 July 2017. He made his debut on 23 August, coming on as a substitute for Mpho Matsi and scoring Cape Town City's third goal in a 3–1 win over Platinum Stars.

== International career ==
Having not previously represented South Africa at age group level, Modise made his debut for the South Africa national team on 26 May 2007 against Malawi in the 2007 COSAFA Cup. He scored his first international goals against Mauritius during the tournament, which South Africa ultimately went on to win. Modise's form also earned him the Player of the Tournament award. The following year, he was named in nation's squad for the 2008 African Nations Cup tournament in Ghana.

In 2009, Modise was selected for South Africa's squad for Confederations Cup and on 14 June 2009 he was awarded the Budweiser Man of the Match award in the opening game following a win over Iraq. On 24 May 2010, he captained South Africa on the occasion of his 50th appearance against Bulgaria. In doing so, he became the 27th player to captain the nation, and the fastest to reach the 50-cap milestone. He scored his tenth international goal three days later in a 2–1 friendly win over Colombia. He was then selected for the 2010 FIFA World Cup which was hosted by South Africa the following, but drew criticism after poor performances in the opening two matches. Coach Carlos Alberto Parreira dropped him for the subsequent match against France, which South Africa won 2–1.

Modise's last appearance for South Africa came on 14 November 2012 against Poland. In all he made 66 appearances for the national team and scored 10 goals.

== Post-playing career ==
After retiring at the end of the 2018–19 season, Modise continued at Cape Town City working at the offices of the club.

In September 2021, Modise returned to Chloorkop, where he spent arguably the most successful period of his playing career. He was named as a Sundowns ambassador, alongside former teammate Tiyani 'Shuga' Mabunda. Securing the Bag: Teko Is Mzansi’s Hardest Working Man

Modise also currently works as a matchday analyst for Suspersport TV

== Outside football ==
=== Endorsements ===
During his time with Orlando Pirates, Modise was appointed ambassador by global company McDonald's for the 2010 FIFA World Cup and also served as an ambassador for Coca-Cola, Nike, Telkom and Samsung. While sponsored by Nike, Modise was one of only ten global stars selected by the sportswear manufacturer to wear a limited edition pink Mercurial SuperFly boot. His global contemporaries included Cristiano Ronaldo, Zlatan Ibrahimovic, Robinho and Didier Drogba, amongst others. In 2015, Modise left Nike and signed a sponsorship deal with Adidas.

In 2016, Modise became a brand ambassador for motor vehicle manufacturer Volkswagen which saw him receive a 2016 Golf GTI. Following his move to Cape Town City the following year he was endorsed by Lexus.

=== Personal life ===
In 2007, following his move to Orlando Pirates, Modise allegedly made a plea to be reunited with his father. He later denied the reports on local radio station, Radio 702. The reports nonetheless drew widespread media interest and saw Kenneth Ngobani, a resident of the surrounding township, claim that while he was not Modise's father, he had raised him after his step-father had kicked him out of the home he lived in with his mother. He claimed further that Modise's mother had not visited him during this time and that he had groomed him into the soccer player he would later become.

Modise married his wife, Felicia, in 2010 in a marriage in community of property and they share a daughter together. After a protracted sage during which Modise was threatened with jail time for failure to pay maintenance, the couple divorced in 2013. Following the separation, Modise began a relationship with model Lizelle Tabane. Modise later proposed to Tabane but the engagement was broken in 2015 after rumours of infidelity surfaced against her.

In 2014, reports emerged that Modise owed a friend R10 000 after he had promised him a job at Mamelodi Sundowns in order to borrow the money from him. Concurrent reports also indicated that he owed fellow footballer May Mahlangu more than R40 000 for designer goods he bought for ex-fiancé Tabane. The following year, Modise was forced to sell his home in the West Rand to a private buyer after he had defaulted on bond payments for a number of months. In terms of the agreement, he was allowed to continue residing at the property.

In 2017, Modise released a tell-all book, The Curse of Teko Modise, which highlighted rituals performed at his former club Orlando Pirates, among other revelations.

In October 2021, Modise married influencer Koketso "Kokieberry" Chipane and the two are expecting their first child together. However, they had had a traditional wedding in 2018.

== Career statistics ==
=== International goals ===
Scores and results list South Africa's goal tally first, score column indicates score after each Modise goal.

List of international goals scored by Teko Modise
| No. | Date | Venue | Opponent | Score | Result | Competition |
|---|---|---|---|---|---|---|
| 1 | 27 May 2007 | Lobamba, Swaziland | Mauritius | 1–0 | 2–0 | COSAFA Cup |
| 2 | 27 May 2007 | Lobamba, Swaziland | Mauritius | 2–0 | 2–0 | COSAFA Cup |
| 3 | 29 September 2007 | Atteridgeville, South Africa | Botswana | 1–0 | 1–0 | COSAFA Cup |
| 4 | 20 November 2007 | Durban, South Africa | Canada | 1–0 | 2–0 | Friendly match |
| 5 | 20 November 2007 | Durban, South Africa | Canada | 2–0 | 2–0 | Friendly match |
| 6 | 19 August 2008 | London, England | Australia | 2–2 | 2–2 | Friendly match |
| 7 | 19 November 2008 | Rustenburg, South Africa | Cameroon | 1–0 | 3–2 | Nelson Mandela Challenge |
| 8 | 19 November 2008 | Rustenburg, South Africa | Cameroon | 2–0 | 3–2 | Nelson Mandela Challenge |
| 9 | 27 January 2009 | Atteridgeville, South Africa | Zambia | 1–0 | 1–0 | Friendly match |
| 10 | 27 May 2010 | Johannesburg, South Africa | Colombia | 1–0 | 2–1 | Friendly match |

== Honours ==
Mamelodi Sundowns

- Premier Soccer League: 2013–14, 2015–16
- Nedbank Cup: 2015
- Telkom Knockout: 2015
- CAF Champions League: 2016
- CAF Super Cup: 2017

Orlando Pirates

- MTN 8: 2010
- Telkom Charity Cup: 2008, 2009

Cape Town City

- MTN 8: 2018

South Africa

- COSAFA Cup: 2007

Individual

- Mvela Golden League Player of the Season: 2005–06
- PSL Footballer of the Year: 2008, 2009
- COSAFA Cup Player of the Tournament: 2007
- PSL Midfielder of the Season: 2015
- Nedbank Cup: Player of the Tournament: 2015
- Football Player of the decade - RSA: Setshaba Thamaga Independent Awards: 2017
