= Excellent Walaza =

South African soccer player (born 1987)

Personal information
- Full name: Excellent Musa Walaza
- Date of birth: 8 April 1987 (age 39)
- Place of birth: Soweto, South Africa
- Height: 1.73 m (5 ft 8 in)
- Position: Striker

Team information
- Current team: Vasco da Gama
- Number: 21

Youth career
- –2005: Orlando Pirates

Senior career*
Years	Team	Apps	(Gls)
2005–2011	Orlando Pirates	42	(13)
2009	→ SuperSport United (loan)	5	(1)
2009–2010	→ Bloemfontein Celtic (loan)	23	(3)
2010–2011	→ Vasco da Gama (loan)	10	(0)
2011–2012	Atlie		
Total		80	(17)

International career
2008	South Africa	2	(0)
- * Club domestic league appearances and goals

Excellent Walaza (born 8 April 1987) is a South African former soccer player who played as a striker. He played club football for Orlando Pirates, SuperSport United, Bloemfontein Celtic, Vasco da Gama and Atlie and international football for South Africa.
