= 2019 MTN 8 =

Tournament details
- Country: South Africa
- Teams: 8

Final positions
- Champions: Supersport United (3rd Title)
- Runners-up: Highlands Park

Tournament statistics
- Matches played: 9
- Goals scored: 15 (1.67 per match)
- Top goal scorer(s): 3 goals Thamsanqa Gabuza

The 2019 MTN 8 was the 45th edition of South Africa's annual soccer cup competition, the MTN 8. It featured the top eight teams of the Premier Soccer League at the end of the 2018-19 season.

== Teams ==
The eight teams that competed in the MTN 8 knockout competition are (listed according to their finishing position in the 2018/2019 Premier Soccer League Season):

1. Mamelodi Sundowns
2. Orlando Pirates
3. Bidvest Wits
4. Cape Town City
5. Polokwane City
6. SuperSport United
7. Highlands Park
8. Bloemfontein Celtic

== Quarter-finals ==
17 August 2019
15:00

| Cape Town City | 0–2 | Polokwane City |
|---|---|---|
| | Report | 26' Anas; 84' Mashumba |

Newlands Stadium, Cape Town
17 August 2019
18:00

| Orlando Pirates | 0–1 | Highlands Park |
|---|---|---|
| | Report | 83' Jooste |

Orlando Stadium, Johannesburg
17 August 2019
20:15

| Mamelodi Sundowns | 3–1 | Bloemfontein Celtic |
|---|---|---|
| Zwane 74'; Lebusa 79'; Makgalwa 89' | Report | 57' Mabena |

Lucas Moripe Stadium, Pretoria
18 August 2019
15:00

| Bidvest Wits | 0–3 | SuperSport United |
|---|---|---|
| | Report | 56' Grobler; 64' Gabuza; 88' Gabuza |

Bidvest Stadium, Johannesburg

== Semi-finals ==
31 August 2019
15:00

| Polokwane City | 0–0 | Highlands Park |
|---|---|---|
| | Report |

Peter Mokaba Stadium, Johannesburg
17 September 2019
19:30

| Highlands Park | 0–0 | Polokwane City |
|---|---|---|
| | Report |
Penalties
| | 4–3 |

Makhulong Stadium, Johannesburg

0–0 on aggregate. Highlands Park won on penalties.

1 September 2019
15:00

| SuperSport United | 1–1 | Mamelodi Sundowns |
|---|---|---|
| Gabuza 41' | Report | 43' Sirino |

Lucas Moripe Stadium, Pretoria
18 September 2019
19:30

| Mamelodi Sundowns | 0–2 | SuperSport United |
|---|---|---|
| | Report | 12' Mokoena; 86' Webber |

Lucas Moripe Stadium, Pretoria

SuperSport United won 3–1 on penalties

== Final ==
5 October 2019
18:00

| Highlands Park | 0–1 | SuperSport United |
|---|---|---|
| | Report | 46' Grobler |

Orlando Stadium, Soweto
