= Mandla Ncikazi =

South African football manager and former player

Personal information
- Date of birth: 16 February 1969 (age 57)
- Place of birth: kriel, KwaZulu-Natal, South Africa

Team information
- Current team: Orlando Pirates (technical staff)

Senior career*
Years	Team	Apps	(Gls)
- African Wanderers
- AmaZulu

Managerial career
- Nathi Lions
- 2015: Maritzburg United
- 2020–2021: Lamontville Golden Arrows
- 2021–2022: Orlando Pirates
- 2022-: Orlando Pirates (assistant)
- * Club domestic league appearances and goals

Mandla Ncikazi (born 16 February 1969) is a South African professional football coach and former player who is part of the technical staff at South African Premiership club Orlando Pirates.

== Career ==
Ncikazi was born in Hlokozi, KwaZulu-Natal.

Ncikazi played professional football for African Wanderers and AmaZulu before his career was ended by an achilles tendon injury around 2000. He worked as a school teacher and later as a sports officer in the Department of Education.

Ncikazi went into coaching and held roles as assistant coach at African Wanderers, Durban Stars, Lamontville Golden Arrows, Polokwane City, Free State Stars, Maritzburg United and the South African women's team, whilst he was also head coach at Nathi Lions. He was appointed as manager of Maritzburg United in summer 2015 on a two-year deal, but was sacked in September after a poor start to the campaign. He was appointed as assistant head coach to Clinton Larsen in December 2015. On 15 October 2020, he was appointed as head coach of Lamontville Golden Arrows, but left the club by mutual consent in June 2021.

On 18 June 2021, he joined the backroom staff at Orlando Pirates.
