= 1996 Bob Save Superbowl =

South African football tournament season

1996 Bob Save Super Bowl
Tournament details
- Country: South Africa

Final positions
- Champions: Orlando Pirates
- Runners-up: Jomo Cosmos

The 1996 Bob Save Superbowl was the 1996 season of the South African club football (soccer) knockout tournament, then known as the Bob Save Superbowl for sponsorship reasons.

The tournament saw one of the iconic Soweto Derbys, with Orlando Pirates defeating Kaizer Chiefs 4–1 in the semifinal. The game became known as the Jerry Sikhosana Derby, after Sikhosana's hat-trick.

== Results ==
=== Semifinals ===
2 November 1996

Kaizer Chiefs	1–4	Orlando Pirates
Modise		Sikhosana Sikhosana Sikhosana Mkhalele

3 November 1996

Jomo Cosmos	1–0	Cape Town Spurs

=== Final ===
23 November 1996

Orlando Pirates	1–0	Jomo Cosmos
