= 2015 Telkom Knockout =

Tournament details
- Country: South Africa
- Dates: 19 October-10 December
- Teams: 16

Final positions
- Champions: Mamelodi Sundowns
- Runners-up: Kaizer Chiefs

The 2015 Telkom Knockout was the 34th edition of the Telkom Knockout, a South African cup competition comprising the 16 teams in the Premiership. It took place between September and December 2015. The final was won by Mamelodi Sundowns, who defeated Kaizer Chiefs. Chiefs missed two penalties in the second half.

Sundowns, who won the title for the third time having previously won it in 1990 and 1999, were coached by Pitso Mosimane.

== Results ==
=== Semi-finals ===
7 November 2015

| Kaizer Chiefs | 0–0 | Orlando Pirates |
Penalties
| | 6–5 |

7 November 2015

| Mamelodi Sundowns | 3–1 | SuperSport United |

=== Final ===
16 December 2015

| Mamelodi Sundowns | 3–1 | Kaizer Chiefs |
|---|---|---|
| | Report |
