= Rotson Kilambe =

Zambian footballer (born 1978)

Rotson Kilambe (born August 6, 1978, in Kitwe) is a retired Zambian footballer.

== Career ==
A striker, Kilambe played in South Africa for Kaizer Chiefs, Bloemfontein Celtic, and Mamelodi Sundowns and for Power Dynamos, Yunnan Hongta, and Zanaco F.C. in his native Zambia.

Kilambe debuted for the Zambia national football team in 1998 and has since played a major part in his country's successes. He played at the 1998 and 2000 African Nation Cup Finals.

In September 2001, he was suspended for 6 months from international football since he tested positive for cannabis use following a World Cup qualifier against Cameroon. Kilambe was the first African player to be banned by FIFA on doping related charges. The ban denied him the chance to play at the African Nations Cup Finals in Mali.

Kilambe scored the winner and only goal of the game for Bloemfontein Celtic in the SAA Supa 8 2005 final and then repeated the feat one year later, scoring for Kaizer Chiefs in the 62nd minute of the 2006 final.

== Career statistics ==
=== International ===
Appearances and goals by national team and year
| National team | Year | Apps | Goals |
|---|---|---|---|
| Zambia | 1998 | 7 | 3 |
| Zambia | 1999 | 6 | 3 |
| Zambia | 2000 | 1 | 0 |
| Zambia | 2001 | 9 | 3 |
| Zambia | 2002 | 5 | 3 |
| Zambia | 2003 | 3 | 0 |
| Zambia | 2004 | 2 | 0 |
| Total | | 33 | 12 |

Scores and results list Zambia's goal tally first, score column indicates score after each Kilambe goal.

List of international goals scored by Rotson Kilambe
| No. | Date | Venue | Opponent | Score | Result | Competition | Ref. |
|---|---|---|---|---|---|---|---|
| 1 | 17 February 1998 | Stade Général Aboubacar Sangoulé Lamizana, Bobo-Dioulasso, Burkina Faso | Mozambique | 1–0 | 3–1 | 1998 Africa Cup of Nations | |
| 2 | 27 September 1998 | National Sports Stadium, Harare, Zimbabwe | Zimbabwe | 1–0 | 1–0 | 1998 COSAFA Cup | |
| 3 | 4 October 1998 | Independence Stadium, Lusaka, Zambia | DR Congo | 1–1 | 1–1 | 2000 Africa Cup of Nations qualification | |
| 4 | 24 January 1999 | Mahamasina Municipal Stadium, Antananarivo, Madagascar | Madagascar | 2–1 | 2–1 | 2000 Africa Cup of Nations qualification | |
| 5 | 10 April 1999 | Konkola Stadium, Chililabombwe, Zambia | Kenya | 1–0 | 1–0 | 2000 Africa Cup of Nations qualification | |
| 6 | 16 December 1999 | Estadio General Francisco Morazán, San Pedro Sula, Honduras | Honduras | 1–4 | 1–7 | Friendly | |
| 7 | 5 January 2001 | Nairobi City Stadium, Nairobi, Kenya | Kenya | 1–2 | 1–2 | Friendly | |
| 8 | 29 July 2001 | Tripoli Stadium, Tripoli, Libya | Libya | 2–2 | 4–2 | 2002 FIFA World Cup qualification | |
| 9 | 29 July 2001 | Tripoli Stadium, Tripoli, Libya | Libya | 4–2 | 4–2 | 2002 FIFA World Cup qualification | |
| 10 | 6 July 2002 | Independence Stadium, Lusaka, Zambia | Mozambique | 1–0 | 3–0 | 2002 COSAFA Cup | |
| 11 | 6 July 2002 | Independence Stadium, Lusaka, Zambia | Mozambique | 3–0 | 3–0 | 2002 COSAFA Cup | |
| 12 | 12 October 2002 | Independence Stadium, Lusaka, Zambia | Benin | 1–1 | 1–1 | 2004 Africa Cup of Nations qualification | |

== Honours ==
=== Individual ===
- Zambia Super League Top scorer: 2002

== See also ==
- List of sportspeople sanctioned for doping offences
