= 2007–08 South African Premiership =

Premiership
- Season: 2007–08
- Champions: Supersport United; 1st Premiership title
- Relegated: Black Leopards; Jomo Cosmos
- 2009 CAF Champions League: Supersport United; Ajax Cape Town
- 2009 CAF Confederation Cup: Mamelodi Sundowns (via domestic cup)
- Matches: 240
- Goals: 532 (2.22 per match)
- Top goalscorer: James Chamanga (14)
- Biggest home win: Supersport United 6-2 Free State Stars (23 Mar 2008)
- Biggest away win: Mamelodi Sundowns 0-4 Free State Stars (18 May 2008)
- Highest scoring: Moroka Swallows 6-2 Platinum Stars (9 Dec 2007) (8 goals)
- Longest winning run: (7 wins); Mamelodi Sundowns
- Longest unbeaten run: (13 games); Engen Santos
- Longest winless run: (19 games); Jomo Cosmos
- Longest losing run: (6 games); Black Leopards
- Average attendance: 6,157

The 2007–08 South African Premiership, known as the ABSA Premiership for sponsorship purposes, and also commonly referred to as the PSL after the governing body, was the twelfth season of the Premiership since its establishment in 1996.

It was won by Supersport United, their first league title.

== Team changes ==
Silver Stars, runners-up in the previous season, were sponsored by the Royal Bafokeng Nation, and were renamed Platinum Stars, moving to the Royal Bafokeng Stadium near Rustenburg, while Benoni United sold their franchise to Thanda Zulu Royal, located in Durban.

Maritzburg United were relegated at the end of the 2006–07 season, and replaced by 2006–07 National First Division champions Free State Stars.

== Sponsorship ==
The league was renamed the ABSA Premiership after a R500-million sponsorship deal with banking group ABSA.

== Final table ==
Pos	Team	Pld	W	D	L	GF	GA	GD	Pts	Qualification or relegation
1	Supersport United (C)	30	16	6	8	40	26	+14	54	Qualification for 2008 CAF Champions League
2	Ajax Cape Town	30	14	10	6	44	27	+17	52	Qualification for 2008 CAF Champions League
3	Santos	30	12	13	5	36	29	+7	49	
4	Mamelodi Sundowns	30	13	8	9	40	35	+5	47	Qualification for 2008 CAF Confederation Cup
5	Free State Stars	30	12	9	9	43	40	+3	45	
6	Kaizer Chiefs	30	10	13	7	32	20	+12	43	
7	Moroka Swallows	30	12	7	11	41	41	0	43	
8	Orlando Pirates	30	12	6	12	38	30	+8	42	
9	Golden Arrows	30	10	11	9	34	32	+2	41	
10	Platinum Stars	30	10	10	10	28	32	−4	40	
11	Bloemfontein Celtic	30	11	6	13	30	35	−5	39	
12	Bidvest Wits	30	10	8	12	28	35	−7	38	
13	Amazulu	30	9	7	14	27	36	−9	34	
14	Thanda Royal Zulu	30	8	7	15	31	44	−13	31	
15	Black Leopards (R)	30	8	5	17	27	42	−15	29	Qualification for the relegation play-offs
16	Jomo Cosmos (R)	30	2	16	12	13	28	−15	22	Relegation to National First Division

Source: RSSSF
Rules for classification: 1) Points; 2) Goal difference; 3) Goal scored; 4) lead-to-Head points; 5) Head-to-lead goal difference; 6) Head-to-lead goal scored; 7) Playoff
(C) Champions; (R) Relegated

== Awards ==
=== PSL ===
- Footballer of the Year

Teko Modise (Orlando Pirates)

- Chairman's Award

Musa Otieno (Santos)

- Referee of the Season

Ace Ncobo

- Assistant Referee of the Season

Enoch Molefe

=== ABSA Premiership ===
- Player of the Season

Elias Pelembe (Supersport United)

- Players’ Player of the Season

Itumeleng Khune (Kaizer Chiefs)

- Coach of the Season

Gavin Hunt (Supersport United)

- Goalkeeper of the Season

Itumeleng Khune (Kaizer Chiefs)

- Lesley Manyathela Golden Boot Award

James Chamanga (Moroka Swallows)

- Awesome Goal of the Season

Siboniso Gaxa (Supersport United) vs Mamelodi Sundowns

=== Nedbank Cup ===
- Player of the Tournament

Vusiwe Masondo (Mpumalanga Black Aces)

- Most Promising Player of the Tournament

Thabang Rooi (Mpumalanga Black Aces)

=== Telkom Knockout ===
- Player of the Tournament

Itumeleng Khune (Kaizer Chiefs)

== Top goalscorers ==
Goals	Player	Team
14	(Zambia) James Chamanga	Moroka Swallows
13	(South Africa) Diyo Sibisi	Free State Stars
12	(South Africa) Erwin Isaacs	Engen Santos
11	(South Africa) Katlego Mashego	Supersport United
11	(South Africa) Sandile Ndlovu	Moroka Swallows
10	(Ivory Coast) Serge Djiehoua	Thanda Royal Zulu
10	(South Africa) Excellent Walaza	Orlando Pirates

Last updated: 17 May 2008
Source: PSL official website

== Kits 2007-2008 ==
Team	Supplier	Shirt sponsor
Ajax CT	Puma	MTN
AmaZulu	Reebok	SPAR
Bidvest Wits	Hummel	Bidvest
Black Leopards	Umbro	MTN
Bloemfontein Celtic	Reebok	Vodacom
Engen Santos	Puma	Engen
Free State Stars	Umbro	Vacant
Golden Arrows	Umbro	MTN
Jomo Cosmos	Puma	Bonitas
Kaizer Chiefs	Nike	Vodacom
Mamelodi Sundowns	Diadora	MTN
Moroka Swallows	Mitre	Volkswagen
Orlando Pirates	Adidas	Vodacom
Platinum Stars	Kappa	Dunns
Supersport United	Hummel	DStv
Thanda Royal Zulu	Puma	Thanda
