= 1993 BP Top 8 =

Tournament details
- Teams: 8

Final positions
- Champions: Orlando Pirates (5th title)
- Runners-up: Witbank Aces

The BP Top 8 1993 was the 22nd edition of the competition, then known as the BP Top 8 for sponsorship reasons, featuring the top 8-placed teams at the conclusion of the NSL season.

It was won for the fifth time by Orlando Pirates.

Losing finalist Witbank Aces won the 1993 Bob Save Superbowl later that year.

== Teams ==
The following 8 teams are listed according to their final position on the league table in the 1992 NSL.

1. Kaizer Chiefs
2. Hellenic
3. Wits University
4. Orlando Pirates
5. Jomo Cosmos
6. Mamelodi Sundowns
7. Witbank Aces
8. Santos

== Final ==
Orlando Pirates	3–1	Witbank Aces
