= 2000 BP Top 8 =

Tournament details
- Teams: 8

Final positions
- Champions: Orlando Pirates (7th title)
- Runners-up: Ajax Cape Town

The BP Top 8 2000 was the 26th edition of the competition, then known as the BP Top 8 for sponsorship reasons, featuring the top 8-placed teams at the conclusion of the Premiership season.

It was won for the seventh time by Orlando Pirates, who defended their title won in 1996. The competition had not been held since that year after the Premier Soccer League removed it from the calendar due to overcrowding.

== Teams ==
The following 8 teams are listed according to their final position on the league table in the previous season of the Premiership.

1. Mamelodi Sundowns
2. Orlando Pirates
3. Kaizer Chiefs
4. Ajax Cape Town
5. Manning Rangers
6. Wits University
7. Jomo Cosmos
8. Hellenic

== Semi-finals ==
Orlando Pirates	2–1	Mamelodi Sundowns

== Final ==
Orlando Pirates	2–1	Ajax Cape Town
