= Tinashe Nengomasha =

Zimbabwean footballer (born 1982)

Tinashe Kangira
Personal information
- Full name: Tinashe Washington Nengomasha
- Date of birth: 2 September 1982 (age 44)
- Place of birth: Harare, Zimbabwe
- Height: 1.75 m (5 ft 9 in)
- Position: Defensive midfielder

Senior career*
Years	Team	Apps	(Gls)
–1999	Highlanders	?	(?)
1990–2001	Black Aces	?	(?)
2002–2012	Kaizer Chiefs	261	(2)
2012–2014	Bidvest Wits	35	(0)
2014–2015	Black Aces	11	(0)
2016	All Stars F.C	0	(0)

International career^{‡}
2003–2012	Zimbabwe	31	(1)
- * Club domestic league appearances and goals as of 13 June 2012 ‡ National team caps and goals as of 13 June 2012

Tinashe Nengomasha (born 2 September 1982) is a Zimbabwean former footballer who played primarily as a midfielder for Kaizer Chiefs and Bidvest Wits in the South African Premier Soccer League and the Zimbabwe National team. Nicknamed "The General" for his command of the game, Tinashe was pivotal during his ten-year career at Kaizer Chiefs and is regarded as one of the best Central defensive midfielders in the history of the Chiefs during which time he won numerous awards.

Tinashe won both the South Africa PSL Players' Player of the Season and the PSL Footballer of the Year awards in 2003 and 2004. He also appeared in Zimbabwe's PSL and played for Zimbabwe Warriors in the 2004 AFCON tournament.

== Personal life ==
Anna Nengomasha, the mother of Tinashe Nengomasha revealed that during the early days of her son's career, Tinashe would skip training with the national team because he was afraid of playing alongside Peter Ndlovu and officials would come home in search of him. Anna also attributed the success of her son to her consistent prayers and fasting before every match. She said she was a member of an apostolic sect and that every time Tinashe goes into a game with Kaizer Chiefs she would go into fasting for 24 hours before every game and her son would nearly always have a great match.

He married Samantha Mtukudzi, the daughter of the late Music legend, Oliver Mtukudzi. The couple wedded on 25 December 2011 but had a scandalous divorce just 8 years later. They have two children.
