= 2017 MTN 8 =

Tournament details
- Country: South Africa
- Teams: 8

Final positions
- Champions: SuperSport United
- Runners-up: Cape Town City

Tournament statistics
- Matches played: 9

The 2017 MTN 8 was the 43rd edition of South Africa's annual soccer cup competition, the MTN 8. It featured the top eight teams of the Premier Soccer League at the end of the 2016-17 season.

== Teams ==
The eight teams that competed in the MTN 8 knockout competition are (listed according to their finishing position in the 2016/2017 Premier Soccer League Season):

1. Bidvest Wits
2. Mamelodi Sundowns
3. Cape Town City
4. Kaizer Chiefs
5. SuperSport United
6. Polokwane City
7. Maritzburg United
8. Golden Arrows

== Results ==
=== Quarter-finals ===
11 August 2017
20h00

Bidvest Wits	2–2	Golden Arrows
26' Keene; 62' Keene		11' Lamola; 24' Mahachi
Penalties
	4–3

Bidvest Stadium, Johannesburg
12 August 2017
15h00

Kaizer Chiefs	0–1	Supersport United
		6' Brockie

Moses Mabhida Stadium, Durban
12 August 2017
15h00

Cape Town City	1–0	Polokwane City
37' Mbonani (og)

Cape Town Stadium, Cape Town
13 August 2017
15h00

Mamelodi Sundown	0–1	Maritzburg United
		58' Rusike

Lucas Moripe Stadium, Pretoria

=== Semi-finals ===
==== 1st leg ====
26 August 2017
20h15

Supersport United	1–1	Maritzburg United
54' Phala		84' Maboe

Lucas Moripe Stadium, Pretoria
27 August 2017
15h30

Cape Town City	1–0	Bidvest Wits
44' Patosi

Cape Town Stadium, Cape Town

==== 2nd leg ====
9 September 2017
20h15

Maritzburg United	0–2	Supersport United
		14' Brockie; 44' Brockie

Harry Gwala Stadium, Pietermaritzburg
10 September 2017
15h00

Bidvest Wits	1–2	Cape Town City
12' Johannes (og)		28' Gamal (og); 71' Majoro

Bidvest Stadium, Johannesburg

=== Final ===
14 October 2017
19h00

Supersport United	1–1	Cape Town City
79' Mnyamane		23' Masina
Penalties
	4-2

Moses Mabhida Stadium, Durban
