= Sandile Ndlovu =

South African soccer player

Personal information
- Full name: Sandile Ronald Ndlovu
- Date of birth: 1 July 1980 (age 46)
- Place of birth: Pietermaritzburg, South Africa
- Height: 1.89 m (6 ft 2 in)
- Position: Striker

Youth career
- Ramblers
- Highlanders
- Sobantu

Senior career*
Years	Team	Apps	(Gls)
2003–2007	Mamelodi Sundowns	28	(8)
2004–2005	→ Dynamos (loan)	27	(18)
2006–2007	→ Maritzburg United (loan)	21	(7)
2007–2009	Moroka Swallows	48	(17)
2009–2010	Bloemfontein Celtic	20	(3)
2010–	Dynamos		
2012–2013	Roses United	10	(2)

International career
2005	South Africa	3	(0)
- * Club domestic league appearances and goals

Sandile Ndlovu (born 1 July 1980) is a South African former professional soccer player who played as a striker. He played for Premier Soccer League clubs Bloemfontein Celtic, Moroka Swallows, Maritzburg United, Dynamos and Mamelodi Sundowns, and the South Africa national team.

He hails from KwamaChibisa (Malinyane) Edendale near Pietermaritzburg. In the season of 2004-05 he was the PSL Player's Player of the Season.

Fans nicknamed him AK-47.
