= 2010 MTN 8 =

Tournament details
- Country: South Africa
- Teams: 8

Final positions
- Champions: Orlando Pirates (8th title)
- Runners-up: Moroka Swallows

Tournament statistics
- Matches played: 9
- Goals scored: 20 (2.22 per match)

The 2010 MTN 8 was the 36th edition of this annual knock out tournament. The tournament was won by Orlando Pirates, who beat Moroka Swallows on penalties in the final. The trophy was Orlando Pirates' first major cup win in ten years. It was contested by the eight top teams from the Premier Soccer League table at the end of the 2009–10 season. The tournament began on 20 August 2009, and ended on 2 October 2010. The quarter finals were played as single matches, while the semi-finals are played over two legs. The final was played at the neutral Moses Mabhida Stadium.

== Teams ==
The eight teams qualified for the MTN 8 Wafa Wafa knockout competition are:

1. Supersport United
2. Mamelodi Sundowns
3. Kaizer Chiefs
4. Santos
5. Orlando Pirates
6. Bloemfontein Celtic
7. Ajax Cape Town
8. Moroka Swallows

== Brackets ==
Quarter-final
Ajax Cape Town	1(4)
Mamelodi Sundowns	1(3)
Moroka Swallows	2(4)
Supersport United	2(3)
Kaizer Chiefs	1
Bloemfontein Celtic	0
Orlando Pirates	2
Santos F.C.	1

Semi-final

Final

== Fixtures and results ==
The first round matches were played on 20, 21 and 22 August 2010. The draw for the semi-finals took place on 23 August 2010. The first legs of the semi-finals will be played on 11 and 12 September. The return legs will be played on 25 and 26 September 2010.

=== Quarter-finals ===
20 August 2010

Ajax Cape Town	1–1	Mamelodi Sundowns
Penalties
	4–3

Athlone Stadium, Cape Town
21 August 2010

Moroka Swallows	2–2	Supersport United
Penalties
	4–3

Dobsonville Stadium, Johannesburg

21 August 2010

Kaizer Chiefs	1–0	Bloemfontein Celtic

Rand Stadium, Johannesburg
22 August 2010

Orlando Pirates	2–1	Santos

Orlando Stadium, Johannesburg

=== Teams through to the semi-finals ===
- Ajax Cape Town
- Moroka Swallows
- Kaizer Chiefs
- Orlando Pirates

=== Semi-finals ===
Team 1	Agg.	Team 2	1st leg	2nd leg
Orlando Pirates (South Africa)	2–1	(South Africa) Kaizer Chiefs	1–1	1–0
Ajax Cape Town (South Africa)	2–3	(South Africa) Moroka Swallows	0–0	2–3

==== 1st leg ====
11 September 2010
20:15

Orlando Pirates	1–1	Kaizer Chiefs

FNB Stadium, Johannesburg
12 September 2010
15:00

Ajax Cape Town	0–0	Moroka Swallows

Athlone Stadium, Cape Town

==== 2nd leg ====
25 September 2010
15:00

Moroka Swallows	3–2	Ajax Cape Town

Dobsonville Stadium, Johannesburg
26 September 2010
15:00

Kaizer Chiefs	0–1	Orlando Pirates

FNB Stadium, Johannesburg

=== Final ===
2 October 2010
20:30

Orlando Pirates	1–1	Moroka Swallows
19' Klate (penalty)		86' Shivambu
Penalties
	4–2

Moses Mabhida Stadium, Durban
