= 2003–04 South African Premiership =

- Champions: Kaizer Chiefs
- Matches: 240
- Goals: 566 (2.36 per match)

The 2003–04 South African Premiership was the eighth season of the South African Premiership, the top tier of South African soccer. It was known as the Castle Premiership for sponsorship purposes, and was also commonly referred to as the PSL after the governing body. It was won by Kaizer Chiefs, their first title since 1992.

== Table ==
Pos	Team	Pld	W	D	L	GF	GA	GD	Pts	Qualification or relegation
1	Kaizer Chiefs (C)	30	18	9	3	39	11	+28	63	Qualified for 2005 CAF Champions League
2	Ajax Cape Town	30	17	6	7	42	25	+17	57	Qualified for 2005 CAF Champions League
3	SuperSport United	30	16	5	9	48	24	+24	53	
4	Wits University	30	13	13	4	41	18	+23	52	
5	Orlando Pirates	30	13	11	6	45	30	+15	50	
6	Santos	30	14	7	9	38	31	+7	49	
7	Moroka Swallows	30	13	9	8	45	34	+11	48	
8	Black Leopards	30	10	8	12	34	46	−12	38	
9	Lamontville Golden Arrows	30	9	10	11	32	38	−6	37	
10	Mamelodi Sundowns	30	8	12	10	32	32	0	33 (Note: Three points were deducted)	
11	Silver Stars	30	8	12	10	35	42	−7	36	
12	Manning Rangers	30	7	8	15	35	53	−18	29	
13	Jomo Cosmos	30	6	10	14	21	29	−8	28	
14	Dynamos	30	3	15	12	26	48	−22	24	
15	Hellenic (R)	30	5	8	17	23	44	−21	22 (Note: One point was deducted)	Relegation to 2004–05 National First Division
16	Zulu Royals (Note: Zulu Royals were renamed from Amazulu F.C.) (R)	30	5	7	18	30	61	−31	22	Relegation to 2004–05 National First Division

Rules for classification: 1) Points; 2) Goal difference; 3) Number of goals scored;
(C) Champions; (R) Relegated
