= 2002–03 South African Premiership =

South African Premiership
- Season: 2002–03
- Champions: Orlando Pirates (2nd title)
- Relegated: African Wanderers; Umtata Bush Bucks
- Matches: 240
- Goals: 581 (2.42 per match)

The 2002–03 South African Premiership, known as the Castle Premiership for sponsorship purposes, and also commonly referred to as the PSL after the governing body, was the seventh season of the Premiership since its establishment in 1996.

The title was won by Orlando Pirates, their second championship in three seasons.

== League table ==
Pos	Team	Pld	W	D	L	GF	GA	GD	Pts	Qualification or relegation
1	Orlando Pirates (C)	30	18	7	5	41	16	+25	61	2004 CAF champions League First Round
2	Supersport United	30	16	7	7	54	37	+17	55	2004 CAF champions League First Round
3	Wits University	30	15	9	6	39	29	+10	54	
4	Moroka Swallows	30	15	8	7	52	36	+16	53	
5	Lamontville Golden Arrows	30	15	6	9	33	27	+6	51	
6	Kaizer Chiefs	30	14	8	8	42	26	+16	50	
7	Dynamos	30	12	4	14	39	37	+2	40	
8	Jomo Cosmos	30	10	10	10	33	34	−1	40	
9	Santos	30	11	6	13	33	28	+5	39	
10	Mamelodi Sundowns	30	11	6	13	30	30	0	39	2003 CAF Cup
11	Black Leopards	30	11	3	16	40	42	−2	36	
12	Manning Rangers	30	9	8	13	31	39	−8	35	
13	Ajax Cape Town	30	9	6	15	31	44	−13	33	
14	Hellenic	30	10	3	17	33	47	−14	33	
15	Umtata Bush Bucks (R)	30	8	7	15	29	47	−18	31	Relegated
16	African Wanderers (R)	30	4	6	20	21	62	−41	18	Relegated
17	Qwa Qwa Stars	0	0	0	0	0	0	0	0	Bought out
18	Ria Stars F.C.	0	0	0	0	0	0	0	0	Bought out

Source: rsssf.com
(C) Champions; (R) Relegated

== Club reduction ==
- Free State Stars (Qwa-Qwa) and Ria Stars (Polokwane) were bought out by the league for 8 million rand (roughly US$800,000) each in order to reduce fixture congestion.

== See also ==
- 2001–02 Premier Soccer League
