= 2004–05 South African Premiership =

2003–04 Premiership
- Champions: Kaizer Chiefs
- Matches: 240
- Goals: 574 (2.39 per match)

The 2004–2005 South African Premiership, known as the Castle Premiership for sponsorship purposes, and also commonly referred to as the PSL after the governing body, was the ninth season of the Premiership since its establishment in 1996. It was won by Kaizer Chiefs, who defeated Bloemfontein Celtic on the last day of the season to retain the title.

Wits were relegated for the first time in their history.

== Final table ==
Pos	Team	Pld	W	D	L	GF	GA	GD	Pts	Qualification or relegation
1	Kaizer Chiefs (Note: Kaizer Chiefs would have qualified for the 2006 CAF Champions League preliminary round as champions, but were disqualified from CAF competitions for withdrawing from the 2005 CAF Confederation Cup.) (C)	30	17	11	2	55	26	+29	62	
2	Orlando Pirates	30	17	9	4	52	29	+23	60	Qualified for 2006 CAF Champions League preliminary round
3	Mamelodi Sundowns	30	16	8	6	54	28	+26	56	Qualified for 2006 CAF Champions League preliminary round
4	SuperSport United	30	13	12	5	37	27	+10	51	
5	Moroka Swallows	30	13	10	7	38	29	+9	49	
6	Ajax Cape Town	30	11	8	11	31	39	−8	41	
7	Silver Stars	30	9	11	10	33	30	+3	38	
8	Bloemfontein Celtic	30	9	9	12	32	40	−8	36	
9	Lamontville Golden Arrows	30	8	9	13	29	34	−5	33	
10	Dynamos	30	7	12	11	38	45	−7	33	
11	Bush Bucks	30	8	9	13	39	48	−9	33	
12	Santos	30	8	7	15	27	36	−9	31	
13	Jomo Cosmos	30	7	10	13	27	38	−11	31	
14	Black Leopards	30	6	13	11	30	42	−12	31	
15	Manning Rangers (R)	30	7	8	15	28	49	−21	29	Relegation to 2005–06 National First Division
16	Wits University (R)	30	5	12	13	24	34	−10	27	Relegation to 2005–06 National First Division

Source: https://www.rsssf.org/tablesz/zaf05.html
(C) Champions; (R) Relegated
