= MTN 8 =

South African football cup competition

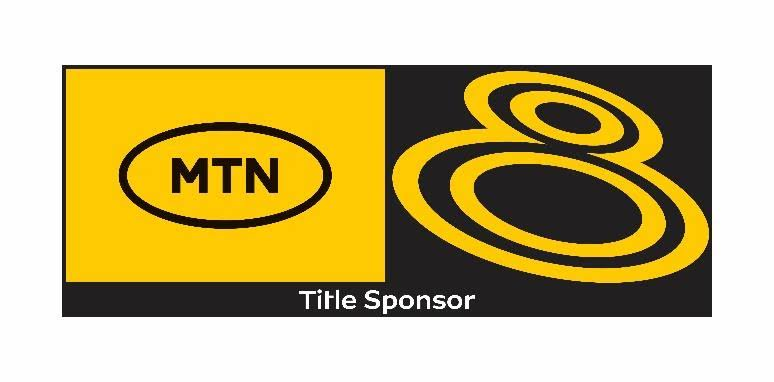
- Founded: 1972; 54 years ago
- Region: South Africa
- Teams: 8
- Current champions: Mamelodi Sundowns (5th title)
- Most championships: Kaizer Chiefs (15 titles)
- Broadcasters: SuperSport; SABC
- Motto: Wafa Wafa (Do or Die)
- 2026 MTN 8

The MTN 8 is a South African soccer cup competition launched in 1972 for teams finishing in the top 8 of the country's top-flight league (currently the Premiership).

The winners receive R10 million and the competition's trophy, which is one of the three domestic trophies attainable by its competitors each soccer season, with the other two being the top-flight league title and the country's premier knock-out competition, the Nedbank Cup. The competition bears the name of its title sponsor; it was known as the BP Top 8 from its inception until 2002, then as the SAA Supa 8 until 2007. It has been known as the MTN 8 since 2008

== Format ==
Since the competition features 8 teams, the first round, also known as the quarter-finals, has the following format:

- 1st-place team v 8th-placed team
- 2nd-placed team v 7th-placed team
- 3rd-placed team v 6th-placed team
- 4th-placed team v 5th-placed team

The second round, or the semi-finals, are played over two legs.

== Prize money ==
As of 2024, the prize money is as follows:

Amount	Payable to
R10 000 000	MTN 8 champion
R1 000 000	7 participants
R17 000 000	Total payout

== Winners ==
The previous winners of the competition are as follows:

As BP Top 8 (1972–2002)

- 1972: Orlando Pirates
- 1973: Orlando Pirates (2)
- 1974: Kaizer Chiefs
- 1975: Moroka Swallows
- 1976: Kaizer Chiefs (2)
- 1977: Kaizer Chiefs (3)
- 1978: Orlando Pirates (3)
- 1979: Moroka Swallows (2)
- 1980: Witbank Black Aces
- 1981: Kaizer Chiefs (4)
- 1982: Kaizer Chiefs (5)
- 1983: Orlando Pirates (4)
- 1984: Wits University
- 1985: Kaizer Chiefs (6)
- 1986: Arcadia Shepherds
- 1987: Kaizer Chiefs (7)
- 1988: Mamelodi Sundowns
- 1989: Kaizer Chiefs (8)
- 1990: Mamelodi Sundowns (2)
- 1991: Kaizer Chiefs (9)
- 1992: Kaizer Chiefs (10)
- 1993: Orlando Pirates (5)
- 1994: Kaizer Chiefs (11)
- 1995: Wits University (2)
- 1996: Orlando Pirates (6)
- 2000: Orlando Pirates (7)
- 2001: Kaizer Chiefs (12)
- 2002: Santos

As SAA Super 8 (2003–2007)

- 2003: Jomo Cosmos
- 2004: SuperSport United
- 2005: Bloemfontein Celtic
- 2006: Kaizer Chiefs (13)
- 2007: Mamelodi Sundowns (3)

As MTN 8 (2008–present)

- 2008: Kaizer Chiefs (14)
- 2009: Golden Arrows
- 2010: Orlando Pirates (8)
- 2011: Orlando Pirates (9)
- 2012: Moroka Swallows (3)
- 2013: Platinum Stars
- 2014: Kaizer Chiefs (15)
- 2015: Ajax Cape Town
- 2016: Bidvest Wits (3)
- 2017: SuperSport United (2)
- 2018: Cape Town City
- 2019: SuperSport United (3)
- 2020: Orlando Pirates (10)
- 2021: Mamelodi Sundowns (4)
- 2022: Orlando Pirates (11)
- 2023: Orlando Pirates (12)
- 2024: Orlando Pirates (13)
- 2025: Orlando Pirates (14)
- 2026: Mamelodi Sundowns (5)

== Results by team ==
Team	Wins	First final won	Last final won
Kaizer Chiefs	15	1974	2014
Orlando Pirates	14	1972	2025
Mamelodi Sundowns	5	1988	2026
Moroka Swallows	3	1975	2012
Bidvest Wits	3	1984	2016
SuperSport United	3	2004	2019
Arcadia Shepherds	1	1986	1986
Santos	1	2002	2002
Jomo Cosmos	1	2003	2003
Witbank Black Aces	1	1980	1980
Bloemfontein Celtic	1	2005	2005
Golden Arrows	1	2009	2009
Platinum Stars	1	2013	2013
Ajax Cape Town	1	2015	2015
Cape Town City	1	2018	2018
