= SuperSport United F.C. =

SuperSport United
- Full name: SuperSport United Football Club
- Nicknames: Matsatsantsa (The Swanky Boys, The Trendsetters); Spartans
- Founded: 8 September 1997, purchased Pretoria City franchise
- Dissolved: 9 April 2025, purchased by Siwelele F.C.
- Ground: Lucas Moripe Stadium, Atteridgeville, Pretoria
- Capacity: 28,900
- Chairman: Khulu Sibiya
- Coach: Gavin Hunt (last coach)
- 2024–25: South African Premiership, 14th
- Website: supersportunited.co.za
Home colours	Away colours

SuperSport United Football Club (often known as SuperSport) was a South African professional football club based in Atteridgeville in Pretoria in the Gauteng province. The team played in the Premiership until their sale to Siwelele following the end of the 2024–25 season. United was known as Matsatsantsa a Pitori amongst its supporters. They usually played their home games at Lucas Moripe Stadium in Atteridgeville.

== History ==
old logo (2001–13)

Supersport was a soccer club wholly owned by SuperSport, the South African group of television channels.

The club was originally known as Pretoria City. City was purchased by M-Net in 1994. M-Net received approval from the National Soccer League and the club was renamed.

The club comprised a professional football team affiliated to the Premier Soccer League as well as various youth academy teams in the SuperSport United Youth Academy playing within their respective SAFA structures.

Home matches were usually played at Lucas Moripe Stadium in Atteridgeville, Pretoria, as well as the Peter Mokaba Stadium in Polokwane.

The club's youth academy was one of the best in the country. Some of the graduates were Daine Klate, Kermit Erasmus, Ronwen Williams all three from Port Elizabeth and Kamohelo Mokotjo. They have previously been linked with English Premier League side Tottenham Hotspur and Dutch side Feyenoord.

Following the club's sale to Siwelele, owned by Calvin Lee John, the son of the Minister of Sport, Gayton McKenzie, in 2025, the governing Premier Soccer League again faced criticism for its regulations that permit long-standing clubs to be sold to consortiums buying their way into the Premiership. League or cup winners that have been sold this way include Manning Rangers, Wits, Moroka Swallows and Bloemfontein Celtic.

== Honours ==
=== Domestic competitions ===
- Premiership
  - Winners (3): 2007–08, 2008–09, 2009–10
- Nedbank Cup
  - Winners (5): 1999, 2005, 2011–12, 2015–16, 2016–17
- Telkom Knockout
  - Winners (1): 2014
- MTN 8
  - Winners (3): 2004, 2017, 2019
- Sparletta Cup
  - Winners (1): 1995
- Second Division
  - Winners (1): 1995

== Notable former coaches ==
- (South Africa) Shane McGregor (1998–99)
- (Zimbabwe) Bruce Grobbelaar (1999–01)
- (South Africa) Pitso Mosimane (1 July 2001 – 30 June 2007)
- (South Africa) Gavin Hunt (1 July 2007 – 28 May 2013)
- (South Africa) Cavin Johnson (19 June 2013 – 29 August 2014)
- (Zimbabwe) Kaitano Tembo (29 August 2014 – 3 September 2014)
- (South Africa) Gordon Igesund (3 September 2014– 27 January 2016)
- (England) Stuart Baxter (27 January 2016– 30 June 2017)
- (South Africa) Eric Tinkler (1 July 2017 – 2018)
- (Zimbabwe) Kaitano Tembo (2018 - 12 April 2022)
- (South Africa) Andre Arendse (interim, 12 April 2022 - July 6, 2022)
- (South Africa) Gavin Hunt (7 July 2022 - 2025)

== Club records ==
- Most starts: (South Africa) Ronald Lawrence 224 (including Pretoria City matches)
- Most goals: (South Africa) Bradley Grobler :58
- Most capped player: (Eswatini) Dennis Masina
- Most starts in a season: (South Africa) Siboniso Gaxa 47 (2004–05)
- Most goals in a season: (South Africa) Glen Salmon 16 (1998–99) (previous record: George Koumantarakis 14; 1997–98)
- Most tackles in a season: Shandukani Mabudu[Development player] (2017 GDL)
- Record victory: 9–0 v (Seychelles) Red Star Anse-aux-Pins (19 March 2005, CAF Confederation Cup)
- Record defeat: 0–5 v (South Africa) Arcadia 7 April 1990, NSL

=== Premiership record ===
- 1996–97 – 9th
- 1997–98 – 14th
- 1998–99 – 8th
- 1999–00 – 10th
- 2000–01 – 8th
- 2001–02 – 2nd
- 2002–03 – 2nd
- 2003–04 – 3rd
- 2004–05 – 4th
- 2005–06 – 7th
- 2006–07 – 6th
- 2007–08 – 1st
- 2008–09 – 1st
- 2009–10 – 1st
- 2010–11 – 7th
- 2011–12 – 3rd
- 2013–14 – 5th
- 2014–15 – 6th
- 2015–16 – 8th
- 2016–17 – 5th
- 2017–18 – 7th
- 2018–19 – 6th
- 2019–20 – 5th
- 2020–21 – 5th
- 2021–22 – 8th
- 2022–23 – 3rd
- 2023–24 – 7th
- 2024–25 – 14th
