= Orlando Pirates F.C. =

South African football club

Orlando Pirates
- Full name: Orlando Pirates Football Club
- Nicknames: Amabhakabhaka; The Sea Robbers; Bucs; Happy People; Buccaneers; Ezimnyama Ngenkani (Black By Force)
- Short name: Pirates
- Founded: 1937; 89 years ago, as Orlando Boys Club
- Ground: Orlando Amstel Arena
- Capacity: 37,313
- Chairman: Irvin Khoza
- Manager: Abdeslam Ouaddou
- League: South African Premiership
- 2025–26: South African Premiership, 1st of 16 (champions)
- Website: orlandopiratesfc.com
| Home colours | Away colours |

Orlando Pirates Football Club, referred to as simply Pirates, is a South African professional football club based in Orlando, Soweto that plays in the South African Premiership, the country's top-tier. The team plays its home matches at Orlando Stadium in Soweto. They are the current PSL champions having clinched the title on the 23rd of May 2026 in the final game of the 2025/26 season against Orbit College.

The club was founded in 1937 and was originally based in Orlando, Soweto. Orlando Pirates are the first club since the inception of the Premier Soccer League in 1996 to have won three major trophies in a single season back to back, having won the domestic league ABSA Premiership, the domestic cup Nedbank Cup and the Top 8 Cup MTN 8 during the ABSA Premiership 2010–11 season and domestic league ABSA Premiership, the League Cup Telkom Knockout and the Top 8 Cup MTN 8 during the ABSA Premiership 2011–12 season. They are one of only two South African teams with Mamelodi Sundowns to win the CAF Champions League, which they won in 1995 and were runners up of 2013 CAF Champions League.

They are also the runners-up of the 2015 and 2021–2022 CAF Confederation Cup.

In total Orlando Pirates have appeared in four Confederation of African Football finals, that is more continental finals than any other Premier Soccer League side.

The club has won nine league titles and 90 trophies in total including 10 South African cup trophies. In 2025 they became the first team to win four consecutive MTN 8 finals. During the 2025/26 the Buccaneers won three trophies, namely, the MTN 8, The Carling Knockout Cup, and the Betway Premiership title. Since 2020, the club has won five MTN 8, two Nedbank Cup, one Carling Knockout Cup, and one Betway Premiership title.

== History ==
Orlando Pirates is one of South Africa's oldest football clubs, having been established in 1937 in Orlando East, Soweto. Orlando Pirates was co-founded by James Mpanza.

=== Early years ===
The founders of Orlando Pirates included the offspring of migrant workers who moved from rural areas to work in the gold mines of Gauteng. Boys in Orlando came together at every available opportunity in open spaces and in informal groupings to play football. The original club was formed in 1934 by a group of teenagers at the Orlando Boys Club. Andries Mkhwanazi, popularly known as "Pele Pele", was a boxing instructor at the Orlando Boys Club when he encouraged formation of a football club in 1937 and a year later those teenagers were competing among the minors of the Johannesburg Bantu Football Association barefoot and without a team kit.

In 1940, Bethuel Mokgosinyane, the first president, bought the first team kit with his own funds. Orlando Boys participated in Johannesburg Bantu Football Association's Saturday League, where they won the Division Two title and gained promotion to Division One in 1944. Andrew Bassie, a key member of the team, suggested the new name 'Orlando Pirates'. The team composed the camp's war cry 'Ezimnyama Ngenkani'.

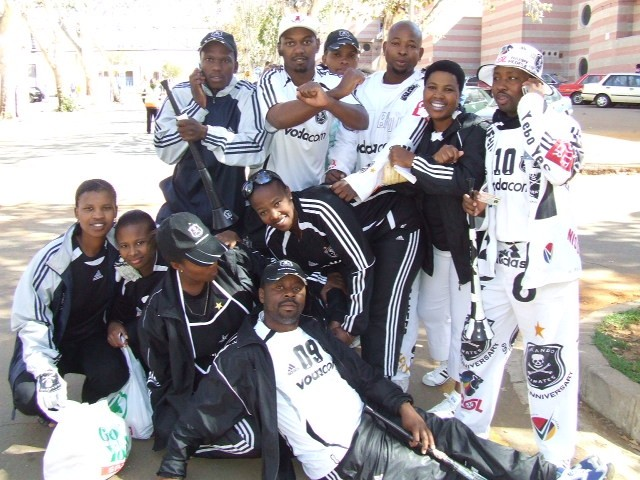

=== Since 1937 ===
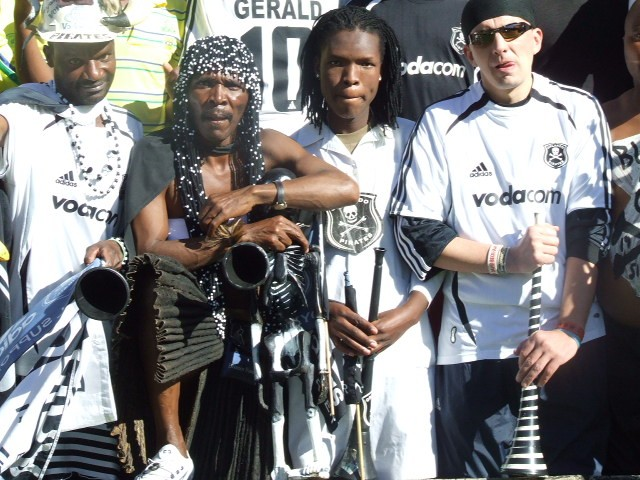
Orlando Pirates supporters

Over the years, Orlando Pirates, also known as 'The Happy People', have accumulated a record of successes having won the National Professional Soccer League title in 1971, 1973, 1975 and 1976, the National Soccer League title in 1994, and the Premiership title five times, in 2001, 2003, 2011, 2012 and 2026.

In 2011, Orlando Pirates enjoyed tremendous success by winning the 2010–11 Premiership, The Nedbank Cup, The MTN 8 Cup and The Telkom Knockout. This year was dubbed as "The Happy Year."

Many other cup triumphs in domestic football have also been recorded, including Vodacom Challenge title victories in the inaugural 1999 tournament and 2005. But the African continent and other areas of the football world took notice of Orlando Pirates Football Club when they won the African Champions Cup (now known as the Champions League) in 1995 and the African Super Cup a year later. Along with Mamelodi Sundowns, TP Mazembe and AS Vita, the Orlando Pirates are the only Southern Hemisphere club to have won the African Champions League. This achievement resulted in the club being honoured by the first State President of the new democratic South Africa, Nelson Mandela; another first for a South African sporting team. Chiefs chairman Kaizer Motaung and his Jomo Cosmos counterpart Jomo Sono were popular players of the highest calibre for the Buccaneers before starting their own clubs.

In 2005, the team, along with Interza Lesego and Ellis Park Stadium Ltd, announced its acquisition of a 51% share in Ellis Park Stadium, making it the first majority black-owned stadium in South Africa. It was in the same year that Orlando Pirates achieved Superbrand status. Superbrands is an international company that identifies and rewards the leading brands around the world; Orlando Pirates are the only South African sports team next to the Springboks and Proteas to be given this status.

=== The Ghost ===
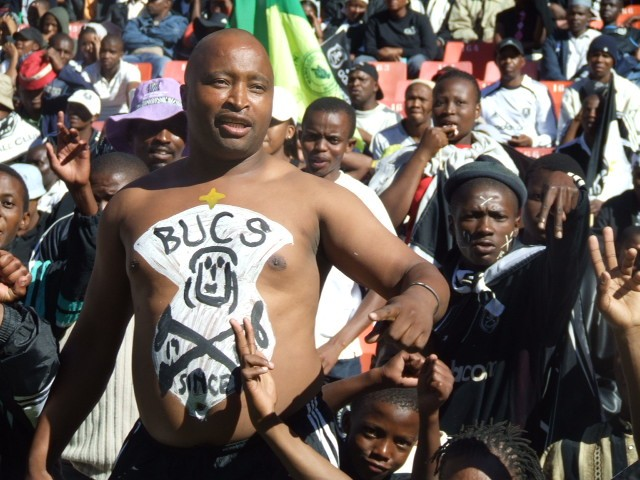

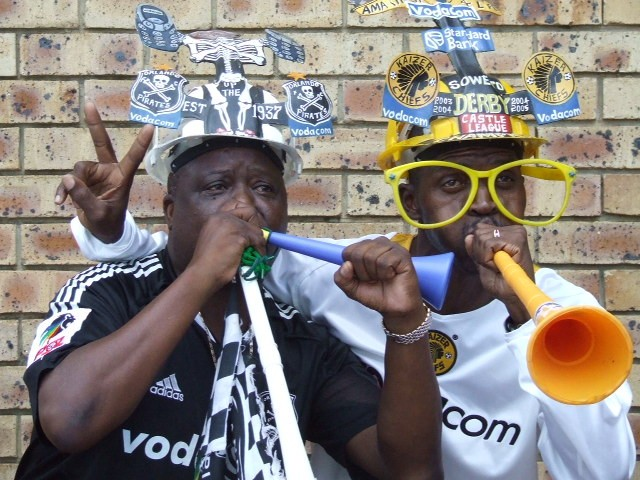

Orlando Pirates’ supporters are known as "the Ghost" and produce an intimidating atmosphere on match days at Orlando Stadium. Fans boast about their team being the first club from Southern Africa to have won the Caf Champions League title, having achieved this in 1995.

=== The Soweto derby ===
The Soweto derby between Kaizer Chiefs and Orlando Pirates is a fiercely contested derby. The first match was on 24 January 1971.

== Honours ==
| Type | Competition | Titles | Seasons |
|---|---|---|---|
| Domestic | League/Premiership | 10 | Winners (10): 1971, 1973, 1975, 1976, 1994, 2000–01, 2002–03, 2010–11, 2011–12, 2025–26 Runners-up (9): 1999–2000, 2004–05, 2005–06, 2008–09, 2017–18, 2018–19, 2022–23, 2023–24, 2024–25 |
| Domestic | FA Cup/Nedbank Cup | 10 | Winners (10): 1973, 1974, 1975, 1980, 1988, 1996, 2010–11, 2013–14, 2022–23, 2023–24 Runners-up (10): 1971, 1976, 1977, 1981, 1984, 1998, 2006, 2015–16, 2016–17, 2024–25 |
| Domestic | League Cup/Carling Knockout | 2 | Winners (2): 2011, 2025 Runners-up (8): 1987, 1990, 1995, 2000, 2008, 2010, 2013, 2018 |
| Domestic | Top 8 Cup/MTN 8 | 14 | Winners (14): 1972, 1973, 1978, 1983, 1993, 1996, 2000, 2010, 2011, 2020, 2022, 2023, 2024, 2025 Runners-up (3): 2007, 2013, 2014 |
| African | CAF Champions League | 1 | Winners (1): 1995 Runners-up (1): 2013 |
| African | CAF Confederation Cup | 0 | Runners-up (2): 2015, 2021-22 |
| African | CAF Super Cup | 1 | Winners (1): 1996 |
| African | Afro-Asian Club Championship | 0 | Runners-up (1): 1996 |

=== Amateur Era (1937-1960) ===
Johannesburg Bantu Football Association (JBFA) Saturday League Division Two

- Champions (1): 1939

Johannesburg Bantu Football Association (JBFA) Saturday League Division One

- Champions (3): 1955, 1956 & 1959

Johannesburg African Football Association (JAFA) Summer League

- Champions (2): 1950, 1952

Transvaal Challenge Cup

- Champions (3): 1952, 1955, 1959

SA Robertson Cup

- Champions (4): 1950, 1951, 1952, 1953

Robor Shield Cup

- Champions (1): 1959

=== Cup Competitions (unofficial) ===
Castle Challenge

- Champions (1): 1992

Sales House Cup

- Champions (5): 1973, 1975, 1977, 1978, 1983

Carling Black Label Cup

- Champions (5) record: 2011, 2012, 2014, 2015, 2019

Vodacom Challenge

- Champions (2): 1999, 2005

Telkom Charity Cup

- Champions (7) 1993,1995,1997, 1999, 2001, 2008, 2009

PSL Reserve League

- Champions (2) record: 2007, 2026

== Performance in CAF Competitions ==
NB: South African football clubs started participating in CAF Competition's in 1993, after 16 years of being banned from FIFA due to the apartheid system. The ban extended from 1976 to 1992.

- African Cup of Champions Clubs / CAF Champions League: 11 appearances

The club appeared in the African Cup of Champions Clubs twice (1995, 1996) and have appeared in the CAF Champions League ten times from 1997 to date. The club has been knocked out 4 times in the preliminary round out of the last 6 appearances.

| Year | Best finish |
|---|---|
| 1995 | Champions |
| 1996 | Quarter-Final |
| 1997 | Group stage |
| 2002 | Second Round |
| 2004 | Second Round |
| 2006 | Semi-Final |
| 2010 | Preliminary Round |
| 2012 | Preliminary Round |
| 2013 | Finalist |
| 2018–19 | Group stage |
| 2019-20 | Preliminary Round |
| 2023-24 | Preliminary Round |
| 2024-25 | Semi-Final |
| 2025-26 | Preliminary Round |

- CAF Confederation Cup: 4 appearances
- African Cup Winners' Cup: 1 appearance

| Year | Best Finish | |
| Year | CAF Confederation Cup | African Cup winners' Cup |
|---|---|---|
| 1999 | - | Semi-Final |
| 2004 | Play-offs | - |
| 2015 | Finalist | - |
| 2020–21 | Quarter -Finalist | - |
| 2021–22 | Finalist | - |

- CAF Super Cup: 1 appearance

| Year | Best finish |
|---|---|
| 1996 | Champions |

Note

- Orlando Pirates did not make an appearance in the CAF Cup. They qualified for the 2001 CAF Cup but withdrew from the competition. As the cup was intended for league runners-up their place in the tournament was then extended to Kaizer Chiefs who had finished third, but they declined as they had already qualified for the more prestigious 2001 African Cup Winners' Cup. Pirates' place in the tournament was then extended to and taken by Ajax Cape Town.
- Contrary to popular belief, Orlando Pirates had already incorporated the star above their badge before the second leg of the 1995 CAF Champions Cup final against ASEC Mimosas. Photographic evidence from the match shows Pirates players wearing jerseys with the star, indicating that the club anticipated their victory and added it before officially securing the title. This challenges the common misconception that the star was only introduced after their triumph

=== Overall matches ===
| Competition | P | W | D | L | GF | GA |
|---|---|---|---|---|---|---|
| CAF Champions League | 80 | 36 | 24 | 20 | 122 | 69 |
| CAF Confederation Cup | 21 | 15 | 2 | 4 | 38 | 22 |
| African Cup Winners' Cup | 8 | 6 | 1 | 1 | 24 | 11 |
| CAF Super Cup | 1 | 1 | 0 | 0 | 1 | 0 |
| Total | 110 | 58 | 27 | 25 | 180 | 102 |

As of 27 September 2021

== Crest and colours ==
=== Kit manufacturers and shirt sponsors ===
| Period | Kit manufacturer | Shirt sponsor | Ref |
|---|---|---|---|
| 1993-97 | Umbro | Alpha Cement | |
| 1997–present | Adidas | Vodacom | |

== Club ranking ==
As of 2 September 2023, Orlando Pirates are ranked 16th in the 2023-24 CAF 5-year ranking.

| Rank | Club | 2018–19 (× 1) | 2019–20 (× 2) | 2020–21 (× 3) | 2021–22 (× 4) | 2022–23 (× 5) | Total |
|---|---|---|---|---|---|---|---|
| 15 | (Algeria) USM Alger | 0 | 1 | 0 | 0 | 5 | 27 |
| 16 | (South Africa) Orlando Pirates | 2 | 0 | 2 | 4 | 0 | 24 |
| 17 | (Sudan) Al-Hilal | 2 | 2 | 1 | 1 | 2 | 23 |

== Notable former coaches ==
- (South Africa) Walter Da Silva (1988)
- (Zimbabwe) Shepherd Murape (1994)
- (Scotland) Joe Frickleton (1995)
- (Russia) Viktor Bondarenko (1995–1996)
- (Nigeria) Shaibu Amodu (1996–1997)
- (Romania) Ted Dumitru (1999–2000)
- (South Africa) Gordon Igesund (2000–2001)
- (France) Jean-Yves Kerjean (2001–2002)
- (Serbia) Kosta Papić (2004–2005)
- (Serbia) Milutin Sredojević (2006–2007)
- (Democratic Republic of the Congo) Bibey Mutombo (2007)
- (South Africa) Owen Da Gama (2007–2008)
- (Netherlands) Ruud Krol (2008–2011)
- (Brazil) Júlio César Leal (2011–2012)
- (Peru) Augusto Palacios (interim; 2012)
- (South Africa) Roger De Sa (2012–2014)
- (South Africa) Eric Tinkler (interim; 2014)
- (Serbia) Vladimir Vermezović (2014–2015)
- (South Africa) Eric Tinkler (2015–2016)
- (Turkey) Muhsin Ertuğral (2016)
- (Peru) Augusto Palacios (interim; 2016–2017)
- (Sweden) Kjell Jonevret (2017)
- (Serbia) Milutin Sredojević (2017–2019)
- (South Africa) Rulani Mokwena (interim; 2019)
- (Germany) Josef Zinnbauer (2019–2021)
- (South Africa) Fadlu Davids & Mandla Ncikazi (interims; 2021–2022)
- (Spain) José Riveiro (2022-2025)
- (Morocco) Abdeslam Ouaddou (2025–present)

== Club records ==
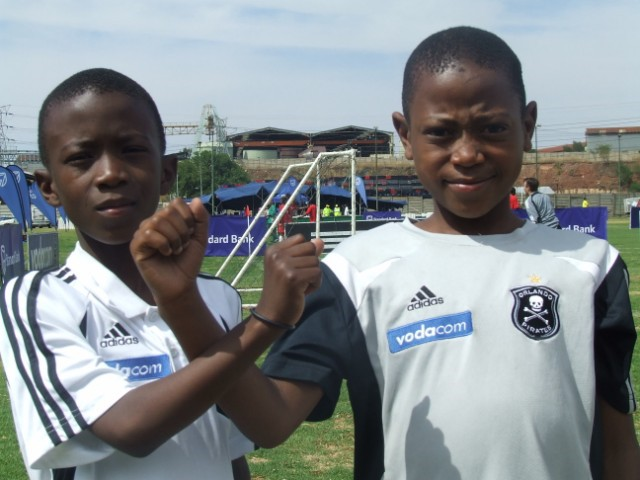
Orlando Pirates youth team players.

- Most appearances: Happy Jele 401
- Most goals: Benedict Vilakazi 52
- Most capped player: Teko Modise 58 (South Africa)
- Most appearances in a season: Senzo Meyiwa 51 (2013–2014), Oupa Manyisa 51 (2013–14) and Willy Okpara 51 (1994–1995)
- Most goals in a season: Dennis Lota 23 (1999–00)
- Record win: 9–1 v Olympics FC (Bob Save Super Bowl, 7 March 1999)
- Record loss: 0–6 vs Mamelodi Sundowns (League, 11 February 2017) Loftus Versfeld Stadium, Pretoria
- Most games unbeaten: 17 (1975, 2005)
- Most goals scored in a season: 61 (1989)
- Most goals conceded in a season: 60 (1986)
- Most wins in a season: 21 (2026)
- Fewest wins in a season: 5 (1985)
- Most defeats in a season: 15 (1985)
- Fewest defeats in a season: 3 (1994,2026)

=== Premiership record ===
Key
| Champions |
| Runners-up |
| Third place |
| In progress |

| Season | Position | Record | | | | | | | |
| Season | Position | Pld | W | D | L | GF | GA | GD | Pts |
|---|---|---|---|---|---|---|---|---|---|
| 1996–97 | 3rd | 34 | 18 | 10 | 6 | 43 | 27 | 16 | 57 |
| 1997–98 | 3rd | 34 | 15 | 12 | 7 | 52 | 33 | 19 | 57 |
| 1998–99 | 3rd | 34 | 17 | 9 | 8 | 55 | 28 | 27 | 60 |
| 1999–2000 | 2nd | 34 | 18 | 10 | 6 | 72 | 36 | 36 | 64 |
| 2000–01 | Champions | 34 | 16 | 13 | 5 | 60 | 34 | 26 | 61 |
| 2001–02 | 3rd | 34 | 15 | 12 | 7 | 43 | 31 | 12 | 57 |
| 2002–03 | Champions | 30 | 18 | 7 | 5 | 41 | 16 | 25 | 61 |
| 2003–04 | 5th | 30 | 13 | 11 | 6 | 45 | 30 | 15 | 50 |
| 2004–05 | 2nd | 30 | 17 | 9 | 4 | 52 | 29 | 23 | 60 |
| 2005–06 | 2nd | 30 | 14 | 12 | 4 | 39 | 24 | 15 | 54 |
| 2006–07 | 5th | 30 | 12 | 10 | 8 | 36 | 30 | 6 | 46 |
| 2007–08 | 8th | 30 | 12 | 6 | 12 | 38 | 30 | 8 | 42 |
| 2008–09 | 2nd | 30 | 15 | 10 | 5 | 37 | 20 | 17 | 55 |
| 2009–10 | 5th | 30 | 10 | 14 | 6 | 26 | 18 | 8 | 44 |
| 2010–11 | Champions | 30 | 17 | 9 | 4 | 41 | 23 | 18 | 60 |
| 2011–12 | Champions | 30 | 17 | 7 | 6 | 39 | 26 | 13 | 58 |
| 2012–13 | 3rd | 30 | 14 | 10 | 6 | 39 | 23 | 16 | 52 |
| 2013–14 | 4th | 30 | 13 | 7 | 10 | 30 | 22 | 8 | 46 |
| 2014–15 | 4th | 30 | 13 | 11 | 6 | 46 | 29 | 17 | 50 |
| 2015–16 | 7th | 30 | 11 | 8 | 11 | 38 | 30 | 8 | 41 |
| 2016–17 | 11th | 30 | 6 | 15 | 9 | 29 | 40 | -11 | 33 |
| 2017–18 | 2nd | 30 | 15 | 10 | 5 | 41 | 26 | 15 | 55 |
| 2018–19 | 2nd | 30 | 15 | 12 | 3 | 44 | 24 | 20 | 57 |
| 2019–20 | 3rd | 30 | 14 | 10 | 6 | 40 | 29 | 11 | 52 |
| 2020–21 | 3rd | 30 | 13 | 11 | 6 | 33 | 22 | 11 | 50 |
| 2021–22 | 6th | 30 | 10 | 14 | 6 | 34 | 28 | 6 | 44 |
| 2022–23 | 2nd | 30 | 16 | 6 | 8 | 40 | 21 | 19 | 54 |
| 2023–24 | 2nd | 30 | 14 | 8 | 8 | 44 | 26 | 18 | 50 |
| 2024–25 | 2nd | 28 | 19 | 4 | 5 | 43 | 20 | 23 | 61 |
| 2025–26 | Champions | 30 | 21 | 6 | 3 | 58 | 12 | 46 | 69 |

== Coaching staff ==
| Position | Name |
|---|---|
| Chairman/managing director | (South Africa) Irvin Khoza |
| Head coach | (Morocco) Abdeslam Ouaddou |
| Assistant coach | (South Africa) Mandla Ncikazi |
| Assistant coach | (South Africa) Rayaan Jacobs |
| Goalkeeper coach | (South Africa) Tyron Damons |
| Head of performance | (South Africa) Ruan Rust |
| Strength and conditioning coach | (Tunisia) Helmi Gueldich |
| Biokineticist | (South Africa) Lauren tate |
| Biokineticist | (South Africa) Dylan Cox |
| Head of sports Sciences | (South Africa) Lee Miles |
| Video analyst | (South Africa) Ncwadi ndabezitha |
| Assistant video analyst | (South Africa) Taariq yaghya |
| Team Doctor | (South Africa) DR Ezekiel matebula |
| Team Doctor | (South Africa) DR Lazarus maphakela |
| Physiotherapist | (South Africa) Kutlwano molefe |
| Physiotherapist | (South Africa) John William |
| Physiotherapist | (South Africa) Bongani mmitsi |
| Kit manager | (South Africa) Lucky matshaba |
| Kit manager | (South Africa) Goodness mhlongo |
| Team security | (South Africa) Nhlanhla Jwara |
| Technical | (South Africa) Junior Bhengu |

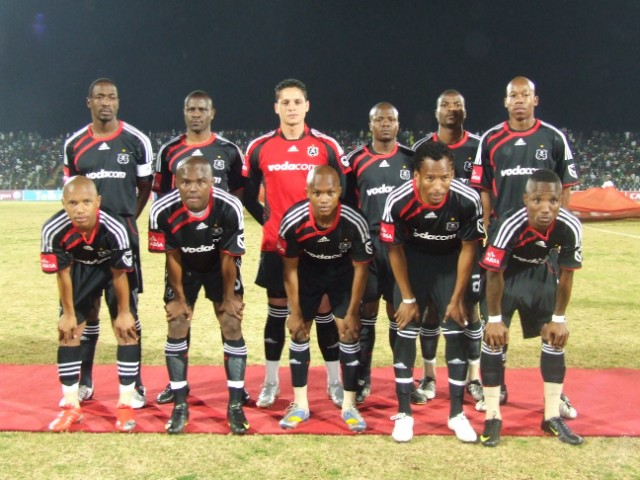
Orlando Pirates starting line-up in 2009. Back row L–R Benson Mhlongo ©, Lucky Lekgwathi, Moeneeb Josephs, Lucas Thwala, Rooi Mahamutsa and Happy Jele; Front row L–R Andile Jali, Thulasizwe Mbuyane, Dikgang Mabalane, Katlego Mashego and Teko Modise.

== Players ==
=== First team squad ===
As of 1 August 2026

Note: Flags indicate national team as defined under FIFA eligibility rules; some limited exceptions apply. Players may hold more than one non-FIFA nationality.

| No. | Pos. | Nation | Player |
|---|---|---|---|
| 3 | DF | RSA | Nkosikhona Ndaba |
| 4 | MF | MLI | Abdoulaye Fousseyni Mariko |
| 5 | DF | RSA | Nkosinathi Sibisi (captain) |
| 6 | DF | RSA | Lebone Seema |
| 7 | DF | NAM | Deon Hotto |
| 8 | MF | RSA | Makhehleni Makhaula |
| 9 | FW | RSA | Yanela Mbuthuma |
| 11 | FW | RSA | Tshepang Moremi |
| 12 | MF | RSA | Oswin Appollis |
| 14 | FW | NZL | Andre de Jong |
| 15 | MF | RSA | Masindi Nemtajela |
| 16 | MF | RSA | Thalente Mbatha |
| 17 | FW | RSA | Evidence Makgopa |
| 18 | FW | RSA | Kabelo Dlamini |
| 19 | DF | RSA | Neo Rapoo |
| 20 | MF | RSA | Simphiwe Selepe |
| 23 | FW | ZAM | Gamphani Lungu |
| 24 | GK | RSA | Sipho Chaine |
| 25 | FW | RSA | Boitumelo Radiopane |
| 26 | MF | RSA | Matome Mmolai |
| 27 | DF | RSA | Tapelo Xoki (vice-captain) |

| No. | Pos. | Nation | Player |
|---|---|---|---|
| 29 | MF | RSA | Mthetheleli Mthiyane |
| 30 | MF | RSA | Sihle Nduli |
| 31 | FW | NOR | Sebastian Pedersen |
| 32 | GK | RSA | Siyabonga Dladla |
| 33 | MF | RSA | Thapelo Mokobodi |
| 36 | FW | RSA | Kamogelo Sebelebele |
| 37 | DF | RSA | Sbangani Zulu |
| 38 | FW | RSA | Mpho Phadime |
| 39 | FW | RSA | Sfiso Luthuli |
| 40 | GK | RSA | Zoey Monyepao |
| 41 | DF | RSA | Reece Braithwaite |
| 43 | DF | RSA | Mpho Chabatsane |
| 44 | DF | RSA | Christian Derbyshire |
| 45 | MF | ZIM | Daniel Msendami |
| 46 | MF | RSA | Cemran Dansin |
| 47 | FW | RSA | Bohlale Ngwato |
| 48 | MF | RSA | Simphiwe Masilela |
| 49 | FW | RSA | Kabelo Kgositsile |
| — | GK | NZL | Dublin Boon |

=== Players out on loan ===
Note: Flags indicate national team as defined under FIFA eligibility rules; some limited exceptions apply. Players may hold more than one non-FIFA nationality.

| No. | Pos. | Nation | Player |
|---|---|---|---|
| — | MF | RSA | Thuso Moleleki (on loan at Orbit College F.C.) |
| — | DF | RSA | Yanga Madiba (on loan at Orbit College F.C.) |
| — | MF | RSA | Goodman Mosele (on loan at Chippa United) |
| — | MF | MLI | Abdoulaye Dine Mariko (on loan at Chippa United) |
| — | FW | RSA | Tshepo Mashiloane (on loan at Sekhukhune United F.C.) |
| — | FW | RSA | Sifiso Luthuli (on loan at Magesi F.C.) |
| — | DF | RSA | Siyabonga Ndlozi (on loan at Magesi F.C.) |

== Jersey number retirement ==
The club has retired four numbers.

Jersey number 10 was retired to honour Jomo Sono, regarded as one of the best players from South Africa. As of 2024, the jersey has been worn in CAF Champions League by Patrick Maswanganyi

Jersey number 13 was retired to honour Clifford Moleko in 1998.

Jersey number 22 was retired to honour Lesley Manyathela after his death in a car accident in 2003. Manyathela finished the 2003 season as top scorer, and the Lesley Manyathela Golden Boot was named after him.

Jersey number 1 was retired to honour goalkeeper Senzo Meyiwa after his murder in 2014.
