= Premiership Coach of the Season =

South African soccer award

The Premiership Coach of the Season is a South African soccer award granted by the Premier Soccer League to the outstanding coach of a Premiership team.

Season	Coach	Club	Nationality
2000–01	Gordon Igesund	Orlando Pirates	South Africa
2001–02	Gavin Hunt	Black Leopards	South Africa
2002–03	Roger De Sa	Wits University	South Africa
2003–04	Ted Dumitru	Kaizer Chiefs	Romania
2004–05	Pitso Mosimane	Supersport United	South Africa
2005–06	Owen Da Gama	Silver Stars	South Africa
2006–07	Muhsin Ertugral	Ajax Cape Town	Turkey
2007–08	Gavin Hunt(2)	Supersport United	South Africa
2008–09	Gavin Hunt(3)	Supersport United	South Africa
2009–10	Gavin Hunt(4)	Supersport United	South Africa
2010–11	Ruud Krol	Orlando Pirates	Netherlands
2011–12	Gordon Igesund(2)	Moroka Swallows	South Africa
2012–13	Stuart Baxter	Kaizer Chiefs	England
2013–14	Pitso Mosimane(2)	Mamelodi Sundowns	South Africa
2014–15	Stuart Baxter(2)	Kaizer Chiefs	England
2015–16	Pitso Mosimane(3)	Mamelodi Sundowns	South Africa
2016–17	Gavin Hunt(5)	Bidvest Wits	South Africa
2017–18	Pitso Mosimane(4)	Mamelodi Sundowns	South Africa
2018–19	Pitso Mosimane(5)	Mamelodi Sundowns	South Africa
2019–20	Pitso Mosimane(6)	Mamelodi Sundowns	South Africa
2020–21	Benni McCarthy	AmaZulu	South Africa
2021–22	Manqoba Mngqithi & Rulani Mokwena	Mamelodi Sundowns	South Africa; South Africa
2022–23	Rulani Mokwena(2)	Mamelodi Sundowns	South Africa
2023–24	Rulani Mokwena(3)	Mamelodi Sundowns	South Africa
2024–25	Miguel Cardoso	Mamelodi Sundowns	Portugal
2025–26	Abdeslam Ouaddou	Orlando Pirates	Morocco
