= 2015–16 South African Premiership =

Premiership
- Season: 2015–16
- Champions: Mamelodi Sundowns (7th title)
- Relegated: Jomo Cosmos
- Champions League: Bidvest Wits; Mamelodi Sundowns
- Confederation Cup: Platinum Stars; SuperSport United
- Matches: 240
- Goals: 562 (2.34 per match)
- Top goalscorer: Collins Mbesuma (14)
- Biggest home win: 3 matches: Bidvest Wits 5-0 Polokwane City (22 January 2016); Orlando Pirates 5-0 Jomo Cosmos (12 March 2016); Bloemfontein Celtic 5-0 Ajax Cape Town (1 May 2016)
- Biggest away win: Platinum Stars 0-4 Bidvest Wits (4 November 2015)
- Highest scoring: 2 matches: Jomo Cosmos 4-3 Chippa United (22 November 2015); Free State Stars 2-5 Mamelodi Sundowns (7 February 2016)
- Longest winning run: Mamelodi Sundowns (6)
- Longest unbeaten run: Mamelodi Sundowns (18)
- Longest winless run: Bloemfontein Celtic; Maritzburg United; University of Pretoria (9)
- Longest losing run: Maritzburg United (8)
- Average attendance: 6,520
- All statistics correct as of 21 May 2016.

The 2015–16 South African Premiership season (known as the ABSA Premiership for sponsorship reasons) was the twentieth season of the Premiership since its establishment in 1996.

Mamelodi Sundowns won their seventh league title in dominant fashion, finishing 14 points ahead of second-place Bidvest Wits. League newcomers Jomo Cosmos dropped into last place for the first time all season in their final game, and were relegated to the National First Division for the 2016-17 season.

== Teams ==
=== Stadiums and locations ===
Location of teams in the 2015–16 Premiership.
Gauteng Premiership football clubs

Football teams in South Africa tend to use multiple stadiums over the course of a season for their home games. The following table indicates the stadium used most often by the club for their home games

Team	City	Home venue	Capacity
Ajax Cape Town	Cape Town	Cape Town Stadium	69,070
Bidvest Wits	Johannesburg	Bidvest Stadium	15,000
Bloemfontein Celtic	Bloemfontein	Free State Stadium	40,911
Chippa United	Port Elizabeth	Nelson Mandela Bay Stadium	48,459
Free State Stars	Phuthaditjhaba	Charles Mopeli Stadium	50,000
Golden Arrows	Durban	Princess Magogo Stadium	12,000
Jomo Cosmos	Tembisa	Makhulong Stadium	20,000
Kaizer Chiefs	Johannesburg	FNB Stadium (Soccer City)	94,736
Mamelodi Sundowns	Pretoria	Lucas Masterpieces Moripe Stadium	23,900
Maritzburg United	Pietermaritzburg	Harry Gwala Stadium	22,000
Mpumalanga Black Aces	Nelspruit	Mbombela Stadium	43,589
Orlando Pirates	Johannesburg	Orlando Stadium	40,000
Platinum Stars	Phokeng	Royal Bafokeng Stadium	44,530
Polokwane City	Polokwane	Peter Mokaba Stadium	45,000
SuperSport United	Pretoria	Lucas Masterpieces Moripe Stadium	23,900
University of Pretoria	Pretoria	Tuks Stadium	8,000

=== Personnel and kits ===
Team	Manager	Supplier	Shirt sponsor
Ajax Cape Town	(South Africa) Roger De Sá	Adidas	Huawei
Bidvest Wits	(South Africa) Gavin Hunt	Kappa	Bidvest
Bloemfontein Celtic	(South Africa) Clinton Larsen	Kappa	MTN
Chippa United	(South Africa) Roger Sikhakhane	Nike	Chippa Holdings
Free State Stars	(Malawi) Kinnah Phiri	Maxed	Bonitas
Golden Arrows	(South Africa) Serame Letsoaka	Mille	Vacant
Jomo Cosmos	(South Africa) Jomo Sono	Puma	Vacant
Kaizer Chiefs	(South Africa) Steve Komphela	Nike	Vodacom
Mamelodi Sundowns	(South Africa) Pitso Mosimane	Nike	Ubuntu Botho
Maritzburg United	(South Africa) Mandla Ncikazi	Umbro	Vacant
Mpumalanga Black Aces	(Turkey) Muhsin Ertuğral	Umbro	ISPS Handa
Orlando Pirates	(South Africa) Eric Tinkler	Adidas	Vodacom
Platinum Stars	(South Africa) Cavin Johnson	Acelli	The Royal Marang Hotel
Polokwane City	(Serbia) Kosta Papić	XCO	Vacant
SuperSport United	(South Africa) Gordon Igesund	Kappa	Engen Petroleum
University of Pretoria	(Northern Ireland) Sammy Troughton	Umbro	WorkersLife

== League table ==
Pos	Team	Pld	W	D	L	GF	GA	GD	Pts	Qualification or relegation
1	Mamelodi Sundowns (C)	30	22	5	3	55	20	+35	71	Qualification for 2017 CAF Champions League
2	Bidvest Wits	30	17	6	7	44	24	+20	57	Qualification for 2017 CAF Champions League
3	Platinum Stars	30	13	9	8	41	33	+8	47 (Note: Platinum Stars were docked 1 point for playing ineligible player Siyabonga Zulu.)	Qualification for 2017 CAF Confederation Cup (Note: SuperSport United qualified as winners of the 2015–16 Nedbank Cup to the 2017 CAF Confederation Cup.)
4	Mpumalanga Black Aces	30	12	11	7	37	29	+8	47	
5	Kaizer Chiefs	30	11	13	6	38	30	+8	46	
6	Chippa United	30	13	6	11	42	39	+3	45	
7	Orlando Pirates	30	11	8	11	38	30	+8	41	
8	SuperSport United	30	10	10	10	36	38	−2	40	Qualification for 2017 CAF Confederation Cup
9	Golden Arrows	30	11	7	12	28	35	−7	40	
10	Ajax Cape Town	30	9	10	11	34	41	−7	37	
11	Bloemfontein Celtic	30	8	12	10	30	26	+4	36	
12	Free State Stars	30	9	8	13	28	37	−9	35	
13	Polokwane City	30	7	10	13	31	44	−13	31	
14	Maritzburg United	30	6	9	15	35	53	−18	27	
15	University of Pretoria (R)	30	6	7	17	25	42	−17	25	Qualification for the relegation play-offs
16	Jomo Cosmos (R)	30	6	7	17	20	41	−21	25	Relegation to National First Division

Updated to match(es) played on 21 May 2016. Source: http://www.espnfc.com/south-african-premiership/2197/table
Rules for classification: 1) points; 2) goal difference; 3) goals scored; 4) head-to-head points; 5) head-to-head goal difference; 6) head-to-head goals scored; 7) playoff
(C) Champions; (R) Relegated

== Positions by round ==
Team ╲ Round	1	2	3	4	5	6	7	8	9	10	11	12	13	14	15	16	17	18	19	20	21	22	23	24	25	26	27	28	29	30
Mamelodi Sundowns	6	2	8	10	7	6	5	5	2	2	2	1	2	1	1	1	1	1	1	1	1	1	1	1	1	1	1	1	1	1
Bidvest Wits	2	9	3	2	1	4	1	1	3	1	1	2	1	3	2	3	3	2	2	2	2	2	2	2	2	2	2	2	2	2
Platinum Stars	6	11	5	4	2	1	2	2	1	4	5	5	6	6	5	5	5	5	5	5	5	3	3	3	3	4	3	3	3	3
Mpumalanga Black Aces	3	3	1	5	3	2	3	3	4	3	3	3	3	2	3	2	2	3	3	4	4	5	5	5	5	5	5	5	5	4
Kaizer Chiefs	6	1	4	3	5	5	6	4	6	5	4	4	4	4	4	4	4	4	4	3	3	4	4	4	4	3	4	4	4	5
Chippa United	6	15	7	11	13	9	9	10	8	8	8	9	9	7	6	6	7	6	6	6	6	7	6	7	8	7	7	7	6	6
Orlando Pirates	14	6	12	9	10	11	11	13	12	10	11	13	10	11	11	13	12	7	9	7	7	6	7	6	6	6	6	6	7	7
SuperSport United	3	3	6	8	12	13	14	11	11	12	9	8	8	10	10	10	10	12	8	11	10	11	10	10	7	8	8	8	9	8
Golden Arrows	3	5	10	7	8	8	8	7	7	7	7	6	5	5	7	7	9	11	7	9	8	9	11	11	11	11	9	9	8	9
Ajax Cape Town	13	8	2	1	6	7	7	8	9	9	12	12	12	12	12	11	13	8	10	8	11	10	9	9	10	9	10	10	12	10
Bloemfontein Celtic	12	13	9	6	4	3	4	6	5	6	6	7	7	9	9	9	8	9	11	12	12	12	12	12	12	12	12	12	10	11
Free State Stars	14	16	16	14	9	10	10	9	10	11	13	10	11	8	8	8	6	10	12	10	9	8	8	8	9	10	11	11	11	12
Polokwane City	1	10	11	12	11	12	13	12	14	13	10	11	13	13	13	12	11	13	13	13	13	13	13	13	13	13	13	13	13	13
Maritzburg United	6	14	15	16	16	16	16	16	16	16	16	16	16	16	16	16	16	16	16	16	16	16	16	16	16	16	16	16	15	14
Univ. of Pretoria	14	7	14	15	14	14	12	14	15	15	15	15	15	15	15	15	15	15	15	15	15	14	15	14	14	14	15	15	16	15
Jomo Cosmos	6	12	13	13	15	15	15	15	13	14	14	14	14	14	14	14	14	14	14	14	14	15	14	15	15	15	14	14	14	16

Leader
2017 CAF Champions League or 2017 CAF Confederation Cup
Relegation to National First Division or Playoff Tournament

Updated to match(es) played on 21 May 2016. Source: Soccerway (in French)

== Season statistics ==
=== Scoring ===
==== Top scorers ====
As of 21 May 2016

Rank	Player	Club	Goals
1	(Zambia) Collins Mbesuma	Black Aces	14
2	(South Africa) Thobani Mncwango	Polokwane	13
2	(South Africa) Prince Nxumalo	Ajax	13
4	(Zimbabwe) Khama Billiat	Mamelodi	12
5	(New Zealand) Jeremy Brockie	SuperSport Utd	11
6	(Colombia) Leonardo Castro	Mamelodi	10
6	(South Africa) Ndumiso Mabena	Platinum	10
8	(Zimbabwe) Evans Rusike	Maritzburg Utd	9
9	(Zimbabwe) Willard Katsande	Kaizer Chiefs	7
9	(England) James Keene	Wits	7
9	(South Africa) Daine Klate	Wits	7
9	(South Africa) Mpho Makola	Pirates	7
9	(South Africa) Lerato Manzine	Chippa Utd	7
9	(South Africa) Sibusiso Vilakazi	Wits	7

==== Hat-tricks ====
Player	For	Against	Result	Date
Thobani Mncwango^{4}	Polokwane City	SuperSport United	4-1	16 January 2016
James Keene	Bidvest Wits	Polokwane City	5-0	22 January 2016
Jeremy Brockie	SuperSport United	Jomo Cosmos	2-4	27 February 2016
Lerato Manzini	Chippa United	Platinum Stars	4-1	27 April 2016
Frank Mhango^{4}	Golden Arrows	Mpumalanga Black Aces	2-4	27 April 2016
Anthony Laffor	Mamelodi Sundowns	University of Pretoria	0-3	4 May 2016

^{4} Player scored 4 goals.

== See also ==
- CAF 5 Year Ranking
