= 2010–11 South African Premiership =

Premiership
- Season: 2010–11
- Champions: Orlando Pirates; 3rd Premiership title
- Relegated: Mpumalanga Black Aces
- CAF Champions League: Orlando Pirates
- CAF Confederation Cup: Black Leopards F.C. (via 2011 Nedbank Cup)
- Matches: 240
- Goals: 602 (2.51 per match)
- Top goalscorer: Knowledge Musona (15 Goals)
- Biggest home win: Bidvest Wits 6–0 Vasco da Gama (6 February 2011)
- Biggest away win: Moroka Swallows 0–4 AmaZulu (23 January 2011)
- Highest scoring: Mamelodi Sundowns 4–4 Ajax Cape Town (6 April 2011); Vasco da Gama 3–5 Platinum Stars (30 April 2011)
- Average attendance: 3,829

The 2010–11 South African Premiership, known as the ABSA Premiership for sponsorship purposes, and also commonly referred to as the PSL after the governing body, was the fifteenth season of the Premiership since its establishment in 1996.

Supersport United were the defending champions, having won their third Premiership title the previous season. The campaign began on 27 August 2010 and ended on 21 May 2011. A total of 16 teams contested the league, 15 of which already contested in the 2009–10 season and one of which was promoted from the National First Division.

Orlando Pirates secured the title with a 2–1 win against Golden Arrows on 21 May 2011. This was their third Premiership title. At the bottom, Mpumalanga Black Aces was relegated to the First Division while Vasco da Gama contested the relegation playoffs and failed to secure its premier league status.

The Soweto Derby on 26 February 2011 attracted the highest crowd with 92,515. The second-highest crowd was the Soweto Derby on 13 November 2011 with 74,875.

== Team information ==
=== Stadia and locations ===
Some of the teams rotated between several home venues during the season.
The table below list the stadium mostly picked as home venue, for each team.
At the bottom of the table, a purple template show all home venues during the season.

Team	Location of training field	Province	Home venue	Capacity
Ajax Cape Town	Cape Town (Parow)	Western Cape	Cape Town Stadium	55,000
AmaZulu	Durban (Durban North)	Kwazulu-Natal	Moses Mabhida Stadium	54,000
Bidvest Wits	Johannesburg (Braamfontein)	Gauteng	Bidvest Stadium	5,000
Bloemfontein Celtic	Bloemfontein	Free State	Seisa Ramabodu Stadium	20,000
Free State Stars	Bethlehem	Free State	Goble Park	20,000
Golden Arrows	Durban (Chatsworth)	Kwazulu-Natal	Chatsworth Stadium	22,000
Kaizer Chiefs	Johannesburg (Soweto)	Gauteng	FNB Stadium (Soccer City)	94,736
Mamelodi Sundowns	Pretoria (Atteridgeville)	Gauteng	Lucas Moripe Stadium	28,900
Maritzburg United	Pietermaritzburg	Kwazulu-Natal	Harry Gwala Stadium	22,000
Moroka Swallows	Johannesburg (Soweto)	Gauteng	Dobsonville Stadium	24,000
Mpumalanga Black Aces	Witbank	Mpumalanga	Puma Stadium (Atlantic Stadium)	20,000
Orlando Pirates	Johannesburg (Soweto)	Gauteng	Orlando Stadium	40,000
Platinum Stars	Rustenburg (Phokeng)	North West	Royal Bafokeng Stadium	42,000
Santos	Cape Town (Lansdowne)	Western Cape	Athlone Stadium	30,000
Supersport United	Pretoria (Atteridgeville)	Gauteng	Lucas Moripe Stadium	28,900
Vasco da Gama	Cape Town (Parow)	Western Cape	Athlone Stadium	30,000

Location of teams in the 2010–11 Premiership.

=== Personnel and sponsoring ===
Team	Manager	Supplier	Shirt sponsor
Ajax Cape Town	Foppe de Haan	Adidas	MTN
AmaZulu	Manqoba Mngqithi	Adidas	SPAR
Bidvest Wits	Roger De Sa	Hummel	Bidvest
Bloemfontein Celtic	Clinton Larsen	Reebok	MTN
Free State Stars	Steve Komphela	Umbro	Bonitas
Golden Arrows	Ernst Middendorp	Millé	MTN
Kaizer Chiefs	Vladimir Vermezović	Nike	Vodacom
Mamelodi Sundowns	Ian Gorowa	Nike	Ubuntu Botho
Maritzburg United	Ian Palmer	Hummel	
Moroka Swallows	Gordon Igesund	Puma	VW
Mpumalanga Black Aces	Mark Harrison	Umbro	Lakama
Orlando Pirates	Ruud Krol	Adidas	Vodacom
Platinum Stars	Owen Da Gama	Puma	Royal Bafokeng
Santos	Boebie Solomons	Canterbury	Engen
Supersport United	Gavin Hunt	Under Armour	DStv
Vasco da Gama	Carlos das Neves	Umbro	Nolands Accountants

=== Managerial changes ===
The table below, list all managerial changes happening In-season.

Team	Outgoing head coach	Manner of departure	Date of vacancy	Position in table	Incoming head coach	Date of appointment	Position in table
Free State Stars	Sunday Marimo	Mutual consent	20 September 2010	9th	Steve Komphela	20 September 2010	9th
Mpumalanga Black Aces	Akis Agiomamitis	Sacked	20 September 2010	16th	Neil Tovey	30 September 2010	16th
Moroka Swallows	Rainer Zobel	Sacked	27 November 2010	16th	Gordon Igesund	29 November 2010	16th
Mpumalanga Black Aces	Neil Tovey	Sacked	24 December 2010	15th	Paul Dolezar	30 December 2010	15th
Mamelodi Sundowns	Antonio López Habas	Sacked	5 February 2011	2nd	Ian Gorowa	5 February 2011	2nd
Mpumalanga Black Aces	Paul Dolezar	Sacked	22 February 2011	16th	Mark Harrison	22 February 2011	16th
Maritzburg United	Ernst Middendorp	Sacked	11 March 2011	14th	Ian Palmer	14 March 2011	14th
Golden Arrows	Zoran Filipovic	Sacked	21 March 2011	11th	Ernst Middendorp	21 March 2011	11th

== League table ==
Pos	Team	Pld	W	D	L	GF	GA	GD	Pts	Qualification or relegation
1	Orlando Pirates (C)	30	17	9	4	41	23	+18	60	Qualification for 2012 CAF Champions League
2	Ajax Cape Town	30	18	6	6	50	36	+14	60	
3	Kaizer Chiefs	30	17	8	5	45	23	+22	59	
4	Mamelodi Sundowns	30	18	4	8	52	28	+24	58	
5	Bloemfontein Celtic	30	14	10	6	37	23	+14	52	
6	Bidvest Wits	30	10	10	10	47	39	+8	40	
7	SuperSport United	30	11	7	12	32	38	−6	40	
8	Santos	30	8	13	9	37	43	−6	37	
9	Free State Stars	30	7	14	9	28	32	−4	35	
10	Platinum Stars	30	6	15	9	34	37	−3	33	
11	Golden Arrows	30	9	6	15	44	49	−5	33	
12	Maritzburg United	30	8	9	13	32	46	−14	33	
13	Moroka Swallows	30	8	8	14	26	40	−14	32	
14	AmaZulu F.C.	30	5	15	10	43	45	−2	30	
15	Vasco da Gama (R)	30	7	9	14	35	47	−12	30	PSL relegation playoffs
16	Mpumalanga Black Aces (R)	30	4	3	23	19	53	−34	15	Relegation to National First Division

Updated to match(es) played on 21 May 2011. Source: Premier Soccer League
Rules for classification: 1) points; 2) goal difference; 3) number of goals scored.
(C) Champions; (R) Relegated
- Black Leopards qualified for the 2012 CAF Confederation Cup as the 2010–11 Nedbank Cup runner-up.

== Results ==
Home \ Away	AJX	AMZ	BVW	BLC	FSS	GOL	KZC	MLS	MAR	MOR	MBA	ORL	PLA	SAN	SUP	VAS
Ajax Cape Town		2–1	3–1	2–0	1–0	3–1	1–0	0–1	2–2	2–0	2–1	3–0	2–0	1–1	2–1	1–0
AmaZulu	1–2		1–1	1–1	0–0	1–2	1–2	1–1	3–2	2–2	4–0	0–0	1–0	2–2	0–1	3–3
Bidvest Wits	2–0	3–3		1–4	2–0	3–2	1–1	1–0	1–2	0–1	3–0	1–1	1–1	3–1	3–0	6–0
Bloemfontein Celtic	0–0	3–1	0–0		1–0	1–1	2–2	1–1	2–0	0–1	1–0	1–1	2–1	1–0	5–0	1–1
Free State Stars	2–1	1–1	2–2	0–1		1–0	1–0	2–1	4–1	1–3	2–1	0–2	1–1	0–0	0–1	1–1
Golden Arrows	1–1	3–2	1–4	0–1	2–0		1–2	1–3	3–0	2–2	3–1	0–2	3–3	3–4	4–2	2–0
Kaizer Chiefs	4–0	3–1	1–0	1–0	1–1	2–0		1–0	3–1	1–0	2–0	1–1	0–0	0–1	2–0	2–3
Mamelodi Sundowns	4–4	2–3	3–0	3–1	2–0	3–2	2–0		3–0	2–0	3–0	1–2	1–1	3–1	2–1	1–0
Maritzburg United	3–0	1–1	1–1	0–0	0–2	0–3	1–1	3–1		1–0	1–0	1–2	1–0	1–0	2–2	2–2
Moroka Swallows	2–3	0–4	1–1	1–2	1–1	0–1	0–1	0–2	1–0		3–1	0–2	1–0	0–0	1–1	3–2
Mpumalanga Black Aces	0–2	1–0	1–1	0–1	1–1	2–1	0–2	0–2	1–2	0–2		0–1	2–3	0–1	2–1	2–2
Orlando Pirates	3–0	1–1	3–2	2–1	0–0	2–1	1–3	2–1	3–1	2–0	0–1		0–0	0–0	0–1	2–0
Platinum Stars	0–3	2–2	1–0	1–1	1–1	0–0	2–3	0–2	0–0	2–0	3–1	1–2		1–1	0–0	1–1
Santos	3–4	1–1	2–1	0–1	3–3	3–1	2–2	0–1	1–1	1–1	1–0	1–1	2–2		2–1	1–0
SuperSport United	1–1	0–0	1–2	2–1	0–0	0–0	0–2	1–0	1–0	3–0	2–1	0–1	0–2	5–2		3–1
Vasco da Gama	1–2	3–1	2–0	0–1	1–1	1–0	0–0	0–1	3–2	0–0	1–0	1–2	3–5	3–0	0–1	

Updated to match(es) played on 21 May 2011. Source: Premier Soccer League
Legend: Blue = home team win; Yellow = draw; Red = away team win.

== Statistics ==
=== Top goalscorers ===
As of 21 May 2011

Rank	Player	Club	Goals
1	Knowledge Musona	Kaizer Chiefs	15
2	Lehlohonolo Majoro	AmaZulu	14
2	Nyasha Mushekwi	Mamelodi Sundowns	14
4	Katlego Mphela	Mamelodi Sundowns	13
4	Bradley Grobler	Platinum Stars	13
6	Diyo Sibisi	Maritzburg United	11
6	Sibusiso Zuma	Vasco	11
6	Collins Mbesuma	Golden Arrows	11
9	Thulani Serero	Ajax Cape Town	10
9	Thembinkosi Fanteni	Ajax Cape Town	10
9	Erwin Isaacs	Santos	10

Last updated: 21 May 2011
Source: Premier Soccer League

== See also ==
- CAF 5 Year Ranking
