= 2005 ABSA Cup =

South African football tournament season

Tournament details
- Country: South Africa

Final positions
- Champions: Supersport United (2nd title)

The 2005 ABSA Cup was the 2005 season of the South African club football (soccer) knockout tournament, known at the time under its then sponsored name, the ABSA Cup.

It was won by Supersport United, who defeated relegated Wits University 1–0. Supersport's coach Pitso Mosimane also earned the PSL Coach of the Season at the end of the year, the first of his six wins.

== Results ==
=== Final ===
28 May 2005

Wits University	0–1	Supersport United
		Ndlela 44'

Olympia Park, Rustenburg
