= 2001–02 South African Premiership =

Premiership
- Champions: Santos
- Relegated: AmaZulu F.C. Tembisa Classic

The 2001–02 South African Premiership, known as the 2001–02 Castle Premiership for sponsorship purposes, and also commonly referred to as the PSL after the governing body, was the sixth season of the Premiership since its establishment in 1996.

Santos surprisingly won the title under the mentorship of Gordon Igesund. This side featured players like Edries Burton, Andre Arendse, Musa Otieno and the club's all-time top goalscorer Jean-Marc Ithier. With the title win Santos became the first – and to date the only – team that was not a founder-member of the Premiership to win the league.

== Final table ==
Pos	Team	Pld	W	D	L	GF	GA	GD	Pts	Qualification or relegation
1	Santos	34	18	10	6	49	30	+19	64	Champions
2	SuperSport United	34	17	8	9	53	42	+11	59	
3	Orlando Pirates	34	15	12	7	43	31	+12	57	
4	Jomo Cosmos	34	16	9	9	39	29	+10	57	
5	Mamelodi Sundowns	34	15	11	8	47	32	+15	56	
6	Moroka Swallows	34	15	8	11	44	43	+1	53	
7	Wits University	34	13	11	10	39	30	+9	50	
8	Black Leopards	34	13	10	11	58	48	+10	49	
9	Kaizer Chiefs	34	12	13	9	38	33	+5	49	
10	Manning Rangers	34	12	9	13	48	45	+3	45	
11	Free State Stars	34	11	11	12	36	32	+4	44	
12	Ria Stars	34	11	10	13	42	47	−5	43	
13	Lamontville Golden Arrows	34	10	12	12	35	37	−2	42	
14	Ajax Cape Town	34	11	8	15	39	42	−3	41	
15	Umtata Bush Bucks	34	10	5	19	47	70	−23	35	
16	Hellenic	34	8	10	16	35	54	−19	34	
17	AmaZulu	34	6	12	16	33	50	−17	30	Relegated
18	Tembisa Classic	34	2	13	19	29	59	−30	19	Relegated

Source: rsssf.com
