= Granwald Scott =

South African soccer player

Personal information
- Full name: Warren Granwald Scott
- Date of birth: 28 November 1987 (age 38)
- Place of birth: Cape Town, South Africa
- Height: 1.73 m (5 ft 8 in)
- Position: Midfielder

Team information
- Current team: Cape Town Spurs

Youth career
- Kensington FC
- Ajax Cape Town

Senior career*
| Years | Team | Apps | (Gls) |
| 2004–2015 | Ajax Cape Town | 204 | (9) |
| 2016 | Slovan Bratislava | 24 | (0) |
| 2017–2019 | Bidvest Wits | 30 | (1) |
| 2020–2022 | Stellenbosch | 39 | (1) |
| 2022– | Cape Town Spurs | 0 | (0) |

International career
| 2012 | South Africa | 1 | (0) |
- * Club domestic league appearances and goals as of 4 October 2022

Granwald Warren Scott (born 28 November 1987) is a South African former professional soccer player who played as a midfielder.

He began his youth career with Kensington AFC before joining the Ajax Cape Town Youth Academy, where he later turned professional at the age of 16.

Over his career, Scott played for several clubs including Ajax Cape Town, SK Slovan Bratislava (Slovakia), Bidvest Wits FC, Stellenbosch FC, and Cape Town Spurs.

He won multiple domestic trophies, including the Premier Soccer League title, Telkom Knockout, MTN 8, and Nedbank Cup, and featured in CAF and UEFA competitions.

Following his professional playing career, Scott became involved in youth development and coaching. He works as a youth coach in Cape Town, training players across schools, local clubs, and with Coerver® Coaching Western Cape, an international coaching program focused on technical player development.

== Early life and youth career ==
Scott was born and raised in Kensington-Factreton, Cape Town. He began playing football at the age of nine while attending Wingfield Primary School, where his talent quickly became evident. That same year, he joined Kensington AFC, a local club that played a key role in his early development.

At the age of 12, he was recruited into the Ajax Cape Town Youth Academy, one of South Africa’s most reputable development systems, where he progressed through the ranks before turning professional.

== Career ==
=== Club career ===
==== Ajax Cape Town ====
Scott signed his first professional contract with Ajax Cape Town at the age of 16 in 2004. He remained at the club until 2015, making over a decade of appearances in the South African Premier Soccer League (PSL).

During his time with Ajax, he was part of the squads that won the 2007 ABSA Cup (now known as the Nedbank Cup), the 2008 Telkom Knockout, and the 2015 MTN 8.

Ajax Cape Town also finished league runners-up in the 2007–08 and 2010-11 seasons.

On the continental stage, Scott featured in the CAF Champions League (2005, 2009) and the CAF Confederation Cup (2007).

In recognition of his leadership and performances, Scott received both the Player’s Player of the Year and Player of the Year awards in the 2014-15 season. "The Urban Warriors midfielder, who notched in with three goals this season, also picked up the Player's Player of the Year award, which was voted by his teammates."

==== SK Slovan Bratislava ====
In 2016, he joined SK Slovan Bratislava in Slovakia, where he played for one season. With Slovan, he helped the team to a Niké Liga runners-up finish and a Slovan Cup runners-up medal, as well as participating in the UEFA Europa League qualifying rounds.

==== Bidvest Wits ====
Scott returned to South Africa in 2017 to sign for Bidvest Wits FC. During his spell with the Johannesburg-based club, he won the 2017 Telkom Knockout and the 2016-17 Premier Soccer League Championship. He also featured in the 2017-18 CAF Champions League campaign.

==== Stellenbosch FC ====
On 24 December 2019 it was confirmed that Scott had joined Stellenbosch. Between 2020 and 2022, he played for Stellenbosch FC, contributing to the club’s steady rise in the PSL after their promotion to the top flight.

"Granwald Scott walked away with the SFC Sportsman of the Year Award for the #DStvPrem 2020-21 season at the clubs Annual Awards last night."

In his final appearance for the club on 21 May 2022, he scored the only goal in a 1–0 victory over Cape Town City at Danie Craven Stadium, marking his final contribution to the team.

==== Cape Town Spurs ====
In 2022, Scotty joined Cape Town Spurs FC, helping the team secure promotion to the PSL in the 2022-23 season.
