= Tyren Arendse =

South African soccer player

Personal information
- Full name: Tyren Roger Arendse
- Date of birth: 31 December 1980 (age 45)
- Place of birth: Cape Town, South Africa
- Height: 1.74 m (5 ft 8 1/2 in)
- Position: Midfielder

Youth career
- Eerste River United
- Santos

Senior career*
Years	Team	Apps	(Gls)
1999–2004	Santos	96	(7)
2004–2006	Orlando Pirates	32	(9)
2006–2008	Mamelodi Sundowns	14	(0)
2008–	Santos	103	(10)

International career^{‡}
2004	South Africa	3	(1)
- * Club domestic league appearances and goals as of 19 May 2012 ‡ National team caps and goals as of 19 May 2012

Tyren Arendse (born 31 December 1980) is a South African former soccer player who played as a midfielder. He played for Santos and South Africa.

He is from Elsie's River on the Cape Flats.

Arendse scored the only goal in the 2001 Bob Save Superbowl, and the first goal in the 2003 ABSA Cup final. Both games were won by Santos, the only two times they have won South Africa's premier cup competition.

== International goals ==
#	Date	Venue	Opponent	Score	Result	Competition
1	2004-08-18	Tunis, Tunisia	Tunisia	2–0	2–0	Friendly match
