= Santos v Igesund =

South African legal case

Santos Professional Football Club (Pty) Ltd v Igesund and Another is an important case in South African contract law. It was heard in the Cape Provincial Division by Foxcroft J, Moosa J and Selikowitz J on 20 September 2002, with judgment delivered on 27 September. Counsel was the appellant was NM Arendse SC (with him Anton Katz); for the first respondent appeared SP Rosenberg and for the second MA Albertus SC.

== Facts ==
The instant appeal concerned the right of the court to order specific performance of a contract for personal services. Gordon Igesund, a football coach, had entered into a coaching contract with Santos, the appellant club. The contract provided that a breach by either of the parties would entitle the other either to cancel the contract and claim damages, or to claim specific performance.

Before the expiry of his contract, Igesund was made a more lucrative offer by Ajax Cape Town, the second respondent, and proceeded to give Santos notice of termination. Santos elected to enforce the contract and sought

1. a declarator that the contract was binding on the parties;
2. an order compelling Igesund to continue serving as Santos head coach; and
3. an order restraining Ajax from taking any action designed to induce Igesund to breach the contract.

== Judgment ==
The court deemed it clear that Igesund's principal reason for leaving Santos was that he had secured a better contract. This was relevant because there is an important distinction between a wrongfully dismissed employee and one who resiles unlawfully from his contract of employment. Igesund, furthermore, was no ordinary servant of the type in respect of whom the English courts refuse to order specific performance; he was a party contracting on equal terms with his employer and able to command a high sum of money in doing so. The court was also not being asked to order specific performance against an employer, but to declare that a contract was binding and to allow Santos to proceed to enforce its contract against an unwilling employee who wished to earn more money elsewhere.

It is generally accepted that it is an injured plaintiff's right to elect whether to hold a defendant to his contract or to claim damages for breach. Igesund had no right to prescribe how Santos would make the election provided by law. The English common law regards specific performance as supplementary to the remedy of damages; it is never granted where damages provide adequate relief. This rule is based on public policy and the sense that it is improper to make a person serve another against his will. South African law, in contrast, regards specific performance as a primary remedy, not a supplementary one.

While Igesund might not want to go back to coach Santos, an order of specific performance would not amount to compelling him to do something against his will. The fact that relations between Santos and Igesund had soured did not detract from the basic fact that Igesund had chosen to break the contract. He had thereby brought all subsequent unpleasantness between him and Santos upon himself.

There was no inequity, the court held, in obliging Igesund to adhere to his contract. Only Santos, which had chosen to take the risk of bringing an application for an order of specific performance, would be prejudiced if Igesund did not perform properly. In that event, the club had several remedies at hand, the most obvious of which was to stop paying him.

As to the view that it would not be possible to determine whether Igesund was functioning optimally, the court found that it had a discretion and could refuse specific performance only if it would operate "unreasonably hardly on the defendant, or where the agreement giving rise to the claim [was] unreasonable, or where the decree would produce injustice, or would be inequitable under all the circumstances." Santos could not be denied its ordinary remedy simply because of the possibility that Igesund might not perform properly, which was a factual issue that would arise only in the future.

It was clear to the court, from Brisley v Drotsky, that courts should be slow in striking down contracts or in declining to enforce them, and should, in specific-performance situations, refuse performance only where a recognised hardship to the defaulting party has been proved. Practical considerations, such as the impossibility of measuring Igesund's performance, did not meet the proper test.

The court held that the court a quo had failed to apply the principle of election and the primary right to specific performance. It also had not appreciated the import of the remark in Brisley in favour of upholding contracts as opposed to striking them down. These failures amounted to misdirections and an approach on the wrong principles.

As to the relief sought against Ajax, the court found nothing to prove that it had induced Igesund to break his contract. The fact that Ajax had made an offer did not in itself prove an inducement. The court a quo therefore had quite correctly refused to make an order against Ajax.

The appeal against Igesund, accordingly, had to succeed, and that against Ajax to fail. There existed a binding agreement between Santos and Igesund, who would have to continue serving as head coach of Santos as dictated by the agreement. The decision by the single judge in Santos v Igesund was thus reversed in part and confirmed in part.
