= Jean-Marc Ithier =

Mauritian footballer

Personal information
- Full name: Jean-Marc Ithier
- Date of birth: 15 July 1965 (age 61)
- Place of birth: Rodrigues, Mauritius
- Position: Striker

Senior career*
Years	Team	Apps	(Gls)
1988–1999	Sunrise Flacq United	147	(66)
1999–2006	Santos Cape Town	203	(71)

International career
1988–2003	Mauritius	50	(11)

Managerial career
- 2007–2008: Santos Cape Town
Medal record
Men's football
Representing Mauritius
Indian Ocean Island Games
Gold medal – first place	2003 Mauritius
Silver medal – second place	1990 Madagascar
- * Club domestic league appearances and goals

Jean-Marc Ithier (born 15 July 1965 in Rodrigues) is a retired Mauritian footballer. Besides Mauritius, he has played in South Africa.

== Career ==
=== Club Football ===
Ithier played for Sunrise Flacq United from 1988 to 1999 and won two trebles in 1991-92 and 1995–96. He played 147 times for the team and scored 66 times. Ithier joined South Africa Premier Soccer League club Engen Santos from the Mauritian club Sunrise Flacq United in 1999, and played for the People's Team until his retirement in 2006. With 71 goals, he is also the club's all-time leading goal-scorer.

Ithier was appointed Engen Santos' caretaker coach after the departure of head coach Roger De Sa, who joined Bidvest Wits after the 06/07 season but was later replaced by David Bright of Botswana. Ithier became an assistant to the club's current head coach, Boebie Solomons. In 2011, Ithier left the club to venture into his own project after deciding to open a football academy that will help develop young talented footballers.

Ithier also previously coached the South African Homeless World Cup squad.

=== International Football ===
Ithier played for Mauritius 50 times and has the 7th most appearances and goals.

== JMI ==
His football club, J.M.I. has an U7, U9, U12, U14, U16, U18 and first team. The U7-U12's don't currently play in a league. From the U14 team up, JMI plays in the Cape Town Tygerberg leagues.

JMI U14 joined the CTTFA in 2024 and came second in the league after Sunningdale FC C team by 3 points. The U14 team currently is coached by him and two others. The U14s went undefeated until the last match which they lost. They scored 100+ goals, conceded roughly 30 and have a goal difference of roughly 70. In the 2024 Season they finished second to Sunningdale FC's C team. Their next season is starting in a few weeks. (All information is accurate as of 24 February 2025)

== Career statistics ==
=== International goals ===
#	Date	Venue	Opponent	Score	Result	Competition
1.	6 June 1989	Stade Linite, Victoria, Seychelles	Seychelles	2–1	Win	Friendly
2.	24 June 1990	National Stadium, Gaborone, Botswana	Botswana	1–0	Win	Friendly
3.	1 July 1990	Independence Stadium, Windhoek, Namibia	Namibia	2–1	Win	Friendly
4.	25 August 1990	Mahamasina Municipal Stadium, Antananarivo, Madagascar	Seychelles	2–0	Win	1990 Indian Ocean Games
5.	27 August 1990	Mahamasina Municipal Stadium, Antananarivo, Madagascar	Comoros	4–0	Win	1990 Indian Ocean Games
6.	30 August 1990	Mahamasina Municipal Stadium, Antananarivo, Madagascar	Madagascar	1–5	Loss	1990 Indian Ocean Games
7.	9 August 1992	Setsoto Stadium, Maseru, Lesotho	Lesotho	2–2	Draw	Friendly
8.	25 July 1993	Sir Anerood Jugnauth Stadium, Belle Vue Maurel, Mauritius	South Africa	1–3	Loss	1994 African Cup of Nations Q.
9.	23 August 1998	Stade George V, Curepipe, Mauritius	Lesotho	3–1	Win	2000 African Cup of Nations Q.
10.	8 October 2000	Stade George V, Curepipe, Mauritius	Congo	1–2	Loss	2002 African Cup of Nations Q.
11.	6 September 2003	Stade George V, Curepipe, Mauritius	Réunion	2–1	Win	2003 Indian Ocean Games
Correct as of 17 April 2021

== Honours ==
Sunrise Flacq United

- Mauritian Premier League: 1988–89, 1989–1990, 1990–1991, 1991–1992, 1994–1995, 1995–1996, 1996–1997
- Mauritian cup 1991–92, 1992–93, 1995–96
- Mauritian Republic Cup 1989–90, 1991–92, 1992–93, 1993–94, 1995–96, 1996–97, 1997–98

Engen Santos

- South African Premiership: 2001–02
- MTN8 Cup: 2002–03
- Nedbank Cup: 2000–01, 2002–03

Mauritius

- Indian Ocean Island Games: Gold Medalist, 2003; Silver Medalist, 2011
