= Andries Mpondo =

South African soccer player

Personal information
- Full name: Andries Khehla Mpondo
- Date of birth: 22 January 1963 (age 63)
- Place of birth: Meadowlands, South Africa
- Position: Attacking midfielder

Youth career
- Roman Rangers
- Meadowlands Inter Africa Eleven

Senior career*
Years	Team	Apps	(Gls)
1981–1996	Moroka Swallows	395	(?)
- * Club domestic league appearances and goals

Andries "Chaka Chaka" Mpondo (born 22 January 1963) is a South African former soccer player who played as a striker. He played for Moroka Swallows his whole career.

== Early life ==
Mpondo played for Roman Rangers and Meadowlands Inter African Eleven as a teenager. He attended Daliwonga High School and Kelokitso High School with Doctor Khumalo and Marks Maponyane in Dube.

== Moroka Swallows ==
He was signed for R20 000 after Fetsi Molatedi left for Chiefs for a record breaking R 45 000. He was the first player to score at the newly built FNB Stadium on 2 September 1989, beating new Kaizer Chiefs and former Manchester United goalkeeper Gary Bailey. By his retirement in 1996 he played 395 matches for Swallows.
