= 2010–11 Nedbank Cup =

Tournament details
- Country: South Africa
- Teams: 32

Final positions
- Champions: Orlando Pirates

The 2010–11 Nedbank Cup was the 2010–11 edition of South Africa's premier knockout club football (soccer) competition, the Nedbank Cup.

Orlando Pirates defeated Black Leopards 3–1 in the final, winning the cup for the first time since 1996, as well as winning the treble, having won the 2010–11 Premier Soccer League and the 2011 MTN 8 earlier in the season.

The season was notable for the run of third-tier Baroka to the semifinals, defeating the cup's most successful team, Kaizer Chiefs, in the quarter-finals.

== Results ==
=== Semi-finals ===
14 May 2011	Orlando Pirates	1–0	Mpumalanga Black Aces
	May 15'

15 May 2011	Baroka	2–2 (1–3 p)	Black Leopards
	Mncwango 11'; Mncwango 111'		Xakane 50'; Ramagalela 110'

=== Final ===
28 May 2011	Orlando Pirates	3–1	Black Leopards	Mbombela
	Chansa 72'; Mbuyane 75'; Mbuyane 89'		Bobe 54'	Stadium: Mbombela Stadium
