= Jingles Pereira =

Portuguese-born South African soccer player (1945–2023)

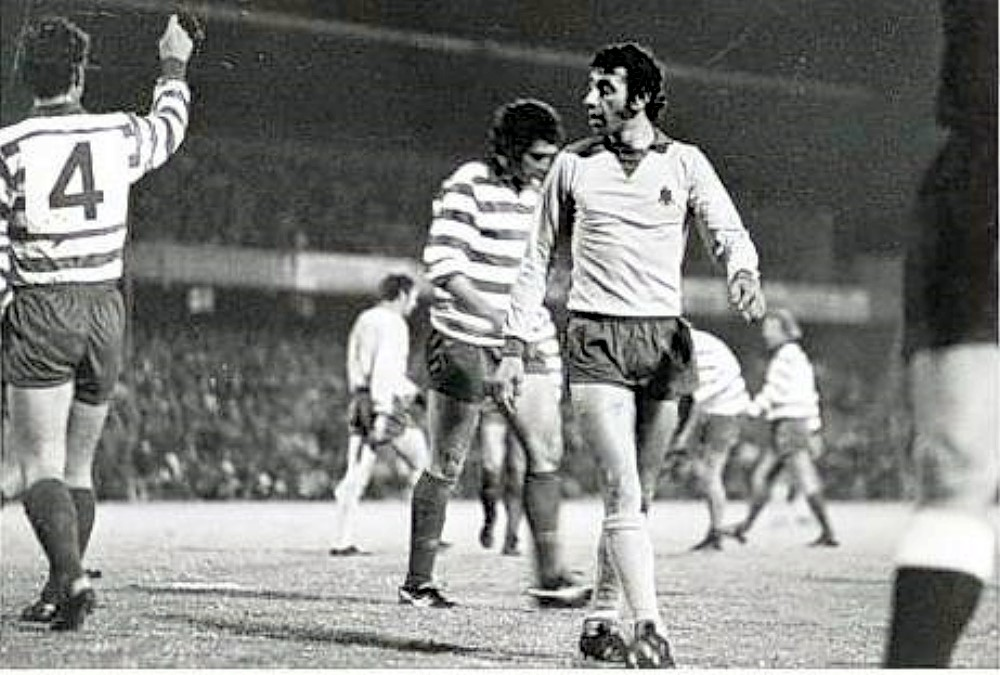
- Cape Town City v Durban City, Hartleyvale, c1972

Personal information
- Full name: Francisco Ivo De Jesus Pereira
- Date of birth: 2 November 1945
- Place of birth: Jardim do Mar, Portugal
- Date of death: 3 September 2023 (aged 77)
- Height: 1.89 m (6 ft 2 in)
- Positions: Sweeper; midfielder

Youth career
- 1955–1963: Stewards & Lloyds AFC

Senior career*
Years	Team	Apps	(Gls)
1963–1972	Vaal United	270	(108)
1972–1973	Jewish Guild	29	(22)
1973–1979	Cape Town City	204	(93)
1979–1983	Kaizer Chiefs	170	(53)
Total		644	(276)

Managerial career
- 1983–1985: Benoni United (player-coach)
- 1986: Orlando Pirates
- * Club domestic league appearances and goals

Francisco Ivo De Jesus Pereira (2 November 1945 – 3 September 2023) was a Portuguese-born South African footballer who played as a midfielder. He was a part of the 1981 quadruple-winning Kaizer Chiefs.

== Early life ==
Francisco Ivo De Jesus Pereira was born on 2 November 1945. He grew up on a farm in Vereeniging where he eventually gained skills from playing with the black labourers' kids. People at his school wanted him to play rugby but he loved soccer and he was heavily criticised for playing the black man's sport.

== Playing career ==
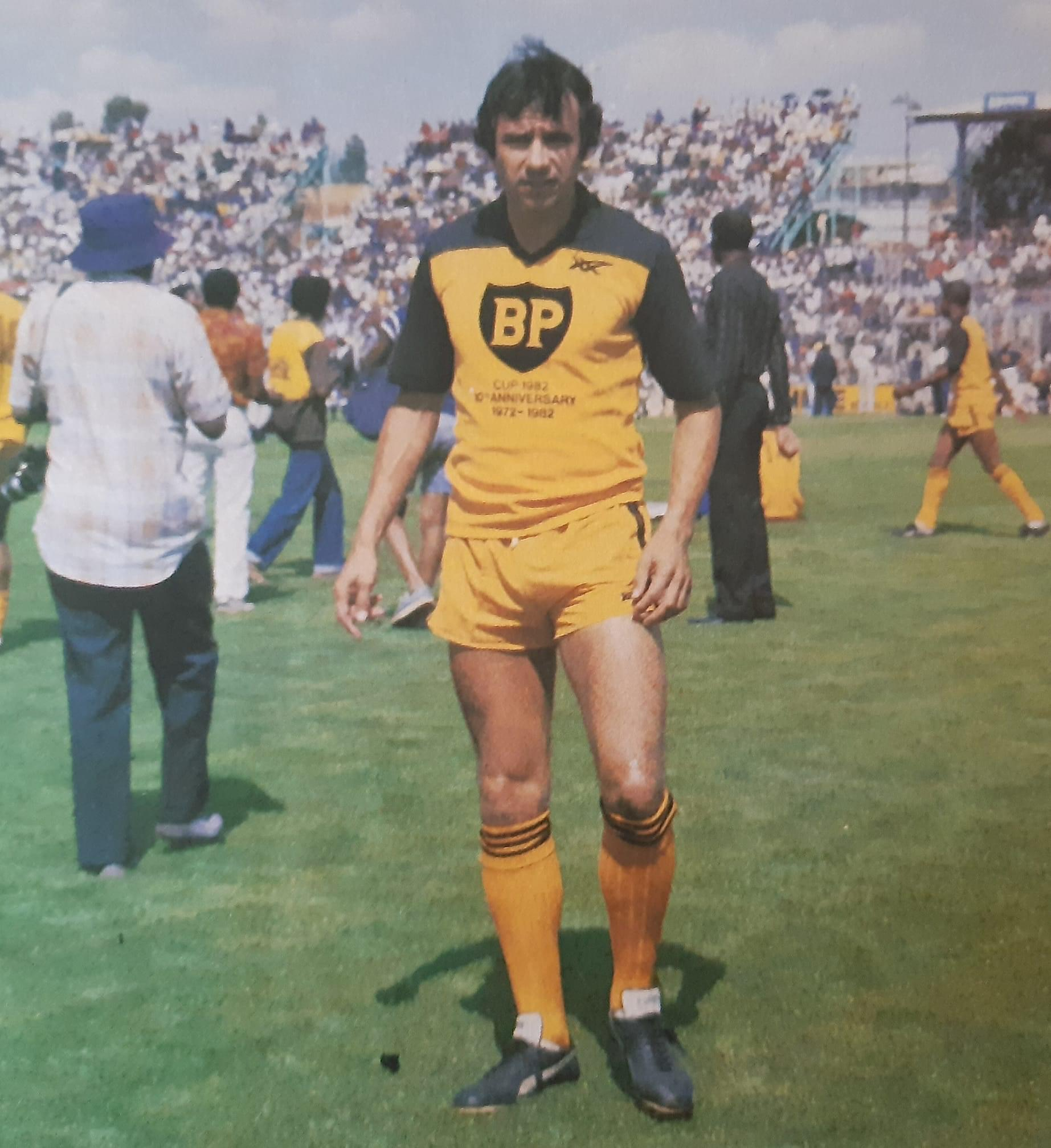
Frank "Jingles" Pereira at the 1982 Cup

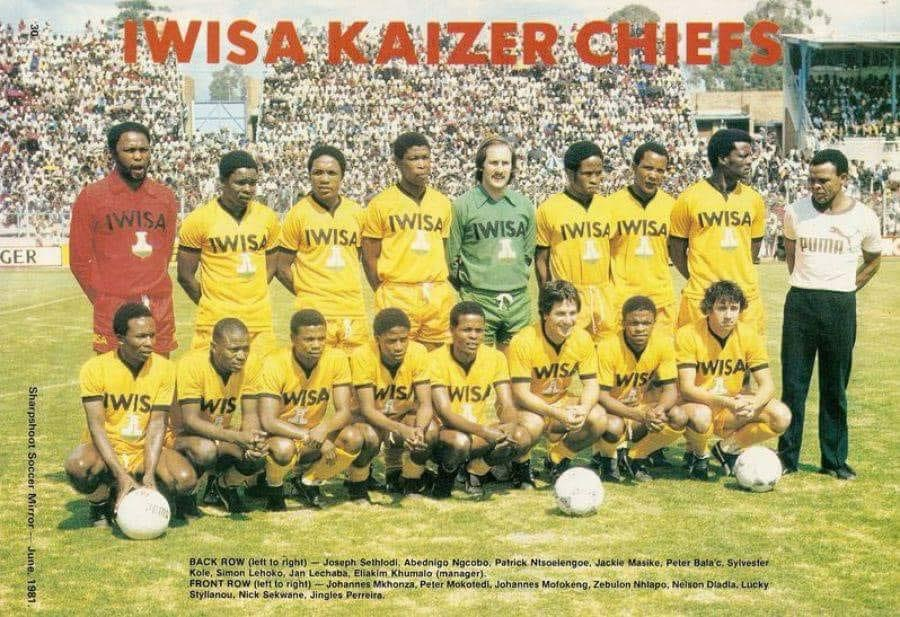
Frank "Jingles" Pereira with the Iwiza Kaizer Chiefs 1981 squad during June 1981

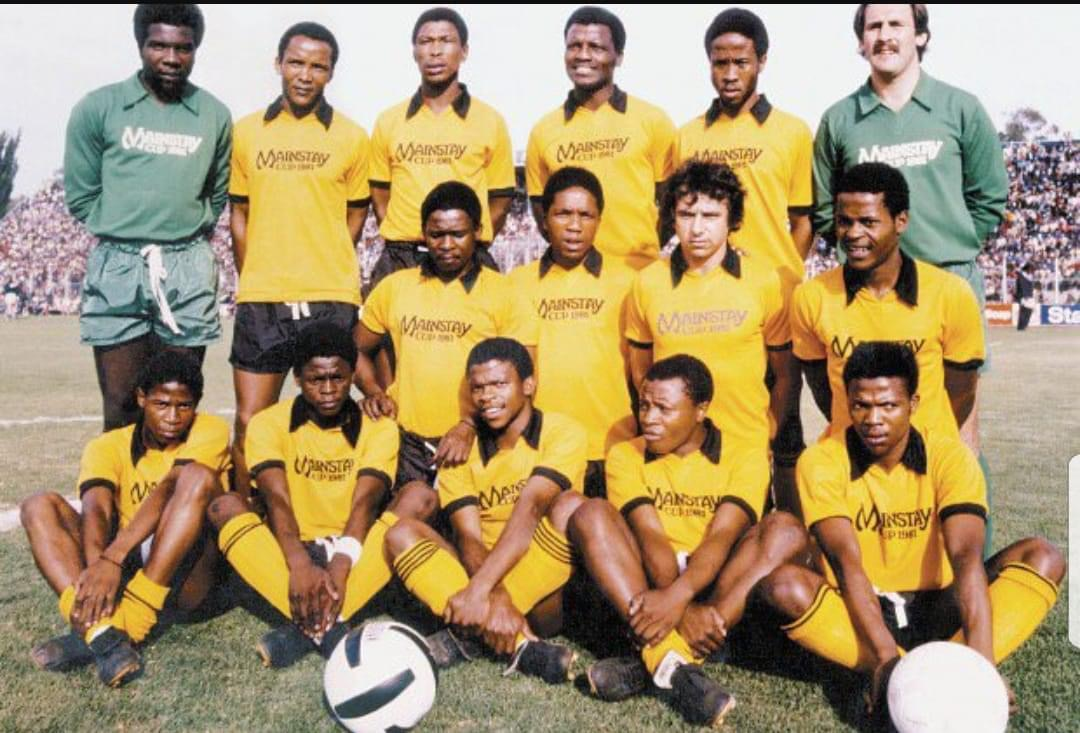
Frank "Jingles" Pereira together with the Iwiza Kaizer Chiefs at the 1981 Mainstay Cup

At the age of 24, Pereira won the 1969 NFL Footballer of the Year award.

At Cape Town City he was the team's top goalscorer in 1973 and 1974 and helped them win the NFL, UTC Bowl and the Champion of Champions.

Pereira joined Chiefs in 1979 as the third white player in their history. Pereira was later converted into a sweeper and was part of the legendary Glamour Boys side that won the quadruple in 1981 before retiring in 1983 with a 276-goal tally. Pereira was even given an "African" nickname by the Chiefs supporters: "Baba ka Sibongile".

== Managerial career ==
Pereira coached Benoni United, where he discovered Roger De Sá, before joining the Orlando Pirates on 29 April 1986 after the Pirates' poor prior run of two wins in 11 matches.

== Post-retirement ==
Pereira was the owner of Nova Papers (Pty Ltd) with his two brothers-in-law and two nephews in downtown Johannesburg. His company produces products such as kitchen towels, serviettes, garage rolls etc.

== Personal life and death ==
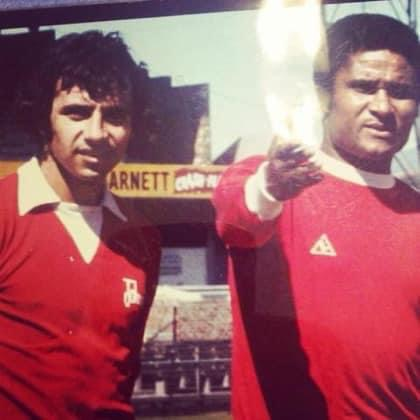
Frank "Jingles" Pereira with Eusébio da Silva Ferreira

Pereira was married three times. His second wife died in a car accident. His third wife is called Helena. He was named Jingles when he played for Stewarts & Lloyds when he was 10 years old because he always had two pennies in his pocket as his good-luck charm. The pennies tinkled in his pocket as he ran on the field and one senior player, Bobby Farrel, said: "Go on, Jingle Bells, go on."

Before his death, he lived in Sandringham, Gauteng.

Pereira died on 3 September 2023 at the age of 77, after an illness.
