= Stuart Baxter =

Scottish football manager

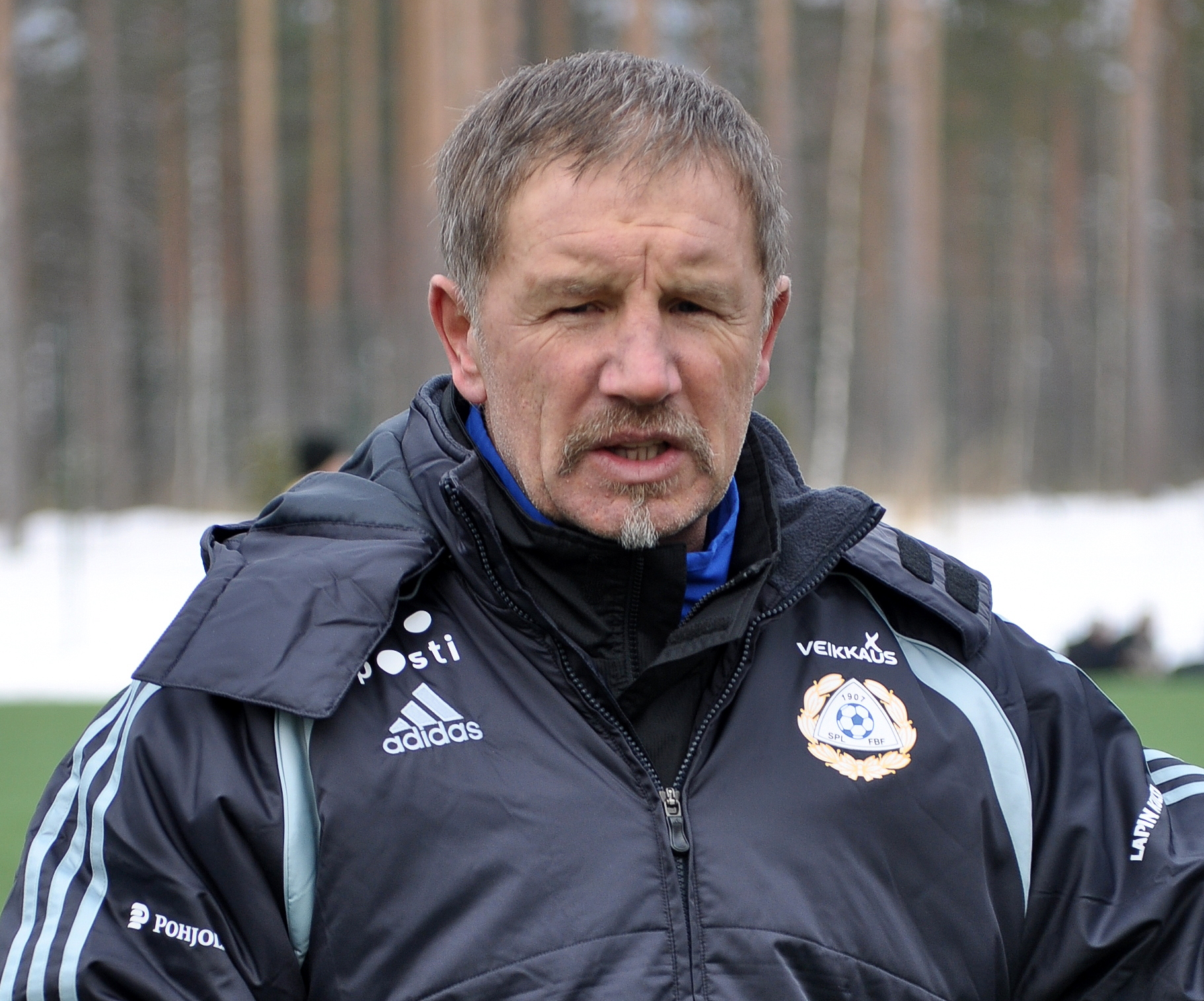
- Baxter as a manager of Finland in 2009

Personal information
- Full name: Stuart William Baxter
- Date of birth: 16 August 1953 (age 73)
- Place of birth: Wolverhampton, England
- Position: Midfielder

Team information
- Current team: Halmstads BK (manager)

Youth career
- 1971–1973: Preston North End

Senior career*
Years	Team	Apps	(Gls)
1973–1975	Preston North End	41	(1)
1975	Morecambe	1	(0)
1975	Dundee United	0	(0)
1976–1977	Stockport County	4	(1)
1978–1979	South Melbourne	50	(4)
1980–1981	Landskrona BoIS	37	(2)
1981	Helsingborg	16	(7)
1982	Landskrona BoIS	14	(1)
1983	San Diego Sockers	27	(12)
1983–1984	Örebro SK	41	(19)
Total		251	(76)

Managerial career
- 1985: Örebro SK
- 1986: IF Skarp
- 1987: Vitória Setubal
- 1988–1991: Halmstads BK
- 1992–1994: Sanfrecce Hiroshima
- 1995–1997: Vissel Kobe
- 1998–2000: AIK
- 2001: Lyn
- 2002–2004: England U19
- 2004–2005: South Africa
- 2006: Vissel Kobe
- 2006–2007: Helsingborgs IF
- 2008–2010: Finland
- 2012–2015: Kaizer Chiefs
- 2015: Gençlerbirliği
- 2016–2017: SuperSport United
- 2017–2019: South Africa
- 2020–2021: Odisha
- 2021–2022: Kaizer Chiefs
- 2023: Helsingborgs IF
- 2025: Boavista
- 2026–: Halmstads BK
- * Club domestic league appearances and goals

Stuart William Baxter (born 16 August 1953) is a Scottish football coach and former player.

Born in England of Scottish parentage, and brought up in both countries, Baxter played professionally for a number of clubs in England, Scotland, Australia, Sweden and in the United States. He has previously managed clubs in Sweden, Norway, Portugal, Japan, South Africa, Turkey and India.

In international football, he has managed South Africa twice as well as Finland and the England under-19 team.

== Early life ==
Stuart Baxter was born in Wolverhampton, Staffordshire, England, on 16 August 1953. His Scottish father, Bill Baxter, was a professional footballer then playing for Wolverhampton Wanderers and later for Aston Villa. Stuart initially grew up in England, while his father was coaching at Aston Villa, before the family moved to Scotland, where Bill had managerial jobs with East Fife and Raith Rovers. During this time, Stuart was educated at Buckhaven High School in Fife. As a result of his background, Baxter is variously described as being English, Scottish or an Anglo-Scot in the media; he has commented on his identity, saying, "If I'm mentioned for a job in Scotland, they call me a Scot. If I'm mentioned for a job in England, they call me an Englishman. I call myself a European". He has also described himself as "a mongrel" and "proud to be British, although I feel more European".

== Playing career ==
Baxter began his playing career with Preston North End in 1973. He joined Scottish club Dundee United in October 1975, but was released the following month after playing only for the reserve team. He then returned to England with Stockport County. Baxter then moved to Australia, Sweden and the United States respectively with South Melbourne, Helsingborgs IF and San Diego Sockers. His playing career ended in 1983.

While playing for South Melbourne, Baxter was called up to train with the Australia national team, and played for Australia in unofficial matches against a Queensland XI and Partizan Belgrade in 1979. As he had not obtained Australian citizenship, he had to be withdrawn from the squad to play against New Zealand when the match was classified as an official international.

== Coaching career ==
Baxter returned to Scandinavia to begin his coaching career; he worked with Örebro SK's youth team. In 1986, he was appointed manager of minor Norwegian side IF Skarp. The following year he landed a larger managerial role with Portuguese team Vitória de Setúbal before returning to Sweden for a three-year stint at Halmstads BK between 1988 and 1991. In his first year with Halmstad he guided them to promotion to the Allsvenskan but the club was relegated at the end of his tenure. Baxter moved to Japan to first coach Sanfrecce Hiroshima, between 1992 and 1994, and then Vissel Kobe, in 1997. He took over as manager of Kobe only days after an earthquake caused devastation in the city and spent two weeks living in a makeshift caravan in the club car park.

=== AIK ===
In 1998, Baxter was bought back to Sweden by AIK, where he guided them to the Swedish championship. Having qualified for the UEFA Champions League, Baxter took AIK into the group stages where the Swedish champions played against some of Europe's largest teams, such as Barcelona, Arsenal and Fiorentina. Unsurprisingly, AIK finished bottom of the group. After two years, he moved to Norwegian side Lyn.

=== England U-19, South Africa, Vissel Kobe and Helsingborg ===
Baxter was hired by the Football Association to coach the England Under-19 team in 2002. After two years, he was hired as South Africa's manager. As guests of the 2005 CONCACAF Gold Cup, he led South Africa to the Quarter Finals before being eliminated via a penalty shootout by Panama. By autumn 2005, he quit this role having failed to qualify for the 2006 World Cup. He later had another short spell at Vissel Kobe before moving back to Helsingborg, this time as manager in 2006. He took the Swedish side past the group stages of the UEFA Cup in 2007, but he resigned at the end of the year.

=== Finland ===
At the beginning of 2008, Baxter was appointed manager of Finland national team on a two-year contract. In January 2009 it was announced that he had signed an extended contract that would keep him in charge of the Finland team through the 2012 European Championships campaign.

In June 2010, Baxter was strongly linked with a possible director of football position at Celtic to work alongside new manager Neil Lennon, however these hopes came to nothing as Celtic were unable to agree a settlement for Baxter's services with the Football Association of Finland.

During the autumn of 2010, the Finland national team lost important matches against Moldova and Hungary, which led to widespread hopes for Baxter's resignation made public by the national team supporters, the media and the country's leading football pundits. It turned out, too, that Baxter had failed to establish communicative relationships with some of the key players in the squad, favouring certain players instead. Baxter, however, refused to resign, attacking journalists for not understanding football well enough in order to evaluate his performance as a manager. The Football Association of Finland did not sack Baxter either, citing, e.g., financial reasons. The Finland national team's position in FIFA World Rankings sank from 33 to 86 under Baxter's guidance In November 2010, The Football Association of Finland announced that Baxter would no longer continue in his job as a manager of the national team.

=== Kaizer Chiefs ===
On 7 May 2012, Baxter was announced as the new manager of South African club, Kaizer Chiefs. He started his duties in June 2012. In the first season under his management, the Amakhosi completed the double, finishing first in the 2012–13 Premier Soccer League and defeating Supersport United 1–0 to win the Nedbank Cup.

The 2013–14 South African Premier Division campaign ended in disappointment with the soweto based side failing to register a trophy despite occupying the top position in the league for the majority of the season. See Log for the previous League campaign:

Chiefs, at the beginning of the 2014–15 South African Premier Division were drawn against Mpumalanga Black Aces in their first game of the cup competition the MTN 8, a match which they won 4–0 to progress to the semi-finals where they beat the defending champions Platinum Stars 2–0 and 3–0 respectively in both legs to set up a final with their Soweto counterparts and rivals Orlando Pirates. During this period, Baxter led chiefs to nine wins in six of their league matches and also their three cup matches leading up to the final. Amakhosi's 10th victory in as many matches in all competitions this term was inspired by an unlikely source, captain Tefu Mashamaite, who wore the armband in Itumeleng Khune's absence and vindicated coach Baxter's decision to give him the role ahead of the more favoured Reneilwe Letsholonyane. Mashamaite, who captained his former club Bidvest Wits to the Nedbank Cup title in 2010, headed home the winner just before the half-hour mark against a Pirates side that seemed hypnotized for the better part of this match Baxter won his third trophy at the club in just his third season to start off yet another season with the MTN 8 trophy on Saturday 20 September 2014.

Baxter completed his second league and cup double with Kaizer Chiefs that season, after reclaiming the PSL league title from Sundowns.

On 2 June 2015, Baxter left Kaizer Chiefs.

=== Genclerbirligi ===
On 9 June 2015, Baxter joined Turkish club Genclerbirligi, but his contract was mutually terminated on 24 August 2015 after defeats in the first two games of the 2015–16 season.

=== SuperSport United ===
On 27 January 2016, Baxter was signed mid-season by SuperSport United. That season Baxter led his side to Nedbank Cup glory. The following season (2016/2017) would see Supersport United retain their Nedbank Cup trophy, beating Orlando Pirates again in the final.

=== Return to South Africa ===
On 4 May 2017, Baxter was named as South Africa coach for a second time, replacing Ephraim Mashaba, who was sacked in December 2016. Under his guidance Bafana Bafana qualified for the 2019 AFCON tournament, and beat tournament favourites and hosts, Egypt in the round of 16, before being knocked out by Nigeria. He resigned in August 2019.

=== Odisha ===
On 19 June 2020, Baxter was announced as the head coach of Indian Super League club Odisha, on a two-year contract. However, he was sacked in February 2021 after complaining during a post-match interview about the refereeing in a defeat, saying that his players "would have to rape someone or get raped himself if he was going to get a penalty."

=== Kaizer Chiefs return ===
In June 2021, Baxter rejoined Kaizer Chiefs for a second spell as head coach. On 17 July 2021, he coached Kaizer Chiefs in their first Champions League Final which they lost 3–0 against Al Ahly.

=== Boavista ===
Baxter was appointed by Portugal side Boavista on a deal until June 2026. He joined the club with five games left in 2024/25 season, with the club being five points away from qualifying for the relegation play-offs.

=== Return to Halmstad ===
On 7 May 2026, Baxter returned to Allsvenskan club Halmstads BK.

== Managerial statistics ==
As of match played 22 November 2026

Managerial record by team and tenure
Team	Nat	From	To	Record				
Team	Nat	From	To	G	W	D	L	Win %
Halmstads BK	(Sweden)	1 January 1988	31 December 1991	102	42	24	36	41.18
Sanfrecce Hiroshima	(Japan)	1 July 1992	31 January 1995	98	51	0	47	52.04
Vissel Kobe	(Japan)	1 February 1995	31 January 1998	106	55	7	44	51.89
AIK	(Sweden)	1 February 1998	31 December 1999	61	30	20	11	49.18
Lyn	(Norway)	6 June 2001	31 December 2001	17	5	5	7	29.41
England U19	(England)	1 January 2002	1 January 2004	5	2	0	3	40.00
South Africa	(South Africa)	24 March 2004	25 November 2005	17	7	3	7	41.18
Vissel Kobe	(Japan)	1 February 2006	4 September 2006	34	20	6	8	58.82
Helsingborgs IF	(Sweden)	1 June 2006	7 December 2007	15	10	5	0	66.67
Finland	(Finland)	28 January 2008	9 November 2010	29	8	5	16	27.59
Kaizer Chiefs	(South Africa)	1 July 2012	2 June 2015	111	66	25	20	59.46
Gençlerbirliği	(Turkey)	9 June 2015	24 August 2015	2	0	0	2	0.00
SuperSport United	(South Africa)	27 January 2016	30 June 2017	68	34	21	13	50.00
South Africa	(South Africa)	4 May 2017	2 August 2019	20	8	4	8	40.00
Odisha	(India)	1 August 2020	2 February 2021	14	1	5	8	7.14
Kaizer Chiefs	(South Africa)	9 June 2021	21 April 2022	26	11	6	9	42.31
Helsingborgs IF	(Sweden)	19 April 2023	31 December 2023	28	9	9	10	32.14
Boavista	(Portugal)	16 April 2025	30 June 2025	5	2	0	3	40.00
Halmstads BK	(Sweden)	7 May 2026	present	24	7	3	14	29.17
Total				782	368	148	266	47.06

== Family ==
As well as his father Bill, Baxter has a son, Lee, who is also a former professional football player and now a goalkeeping-coach.

== Honours ==
=== Manager ===
Halmstad

- Division 1 Södra: 1988

Sanfrecce Hiroshima

- J1 League 1st Stage Champions: 1994

AIK

- Allsvenskan: 1998
- Svenska Cupen: 1998–99

Vissel Kobe

- JFL / J2 League promotion: 1996, 2006

Helsingborg

- Svenska Cupen: 2006

Kaizer Chiefs

- Premier Soccer League: 2012–13, 2014–15
- Nedbank Cup: 2012–13
- MTN 8: 2014

SuperSport United

- Nedbank Cup: 2015–16, 2016–17

South Africa

- COSAFA Cup Plate: 2017, 2018, 2019
- Four Nations Cup: 2018

=== Individual ===
- PSL Coach of the Season: 2012–13, 2014–15

== See also ==
- List of residents of Wolverhampton
