= Pitso Mosimane =

South African soccer coach (born 1964)

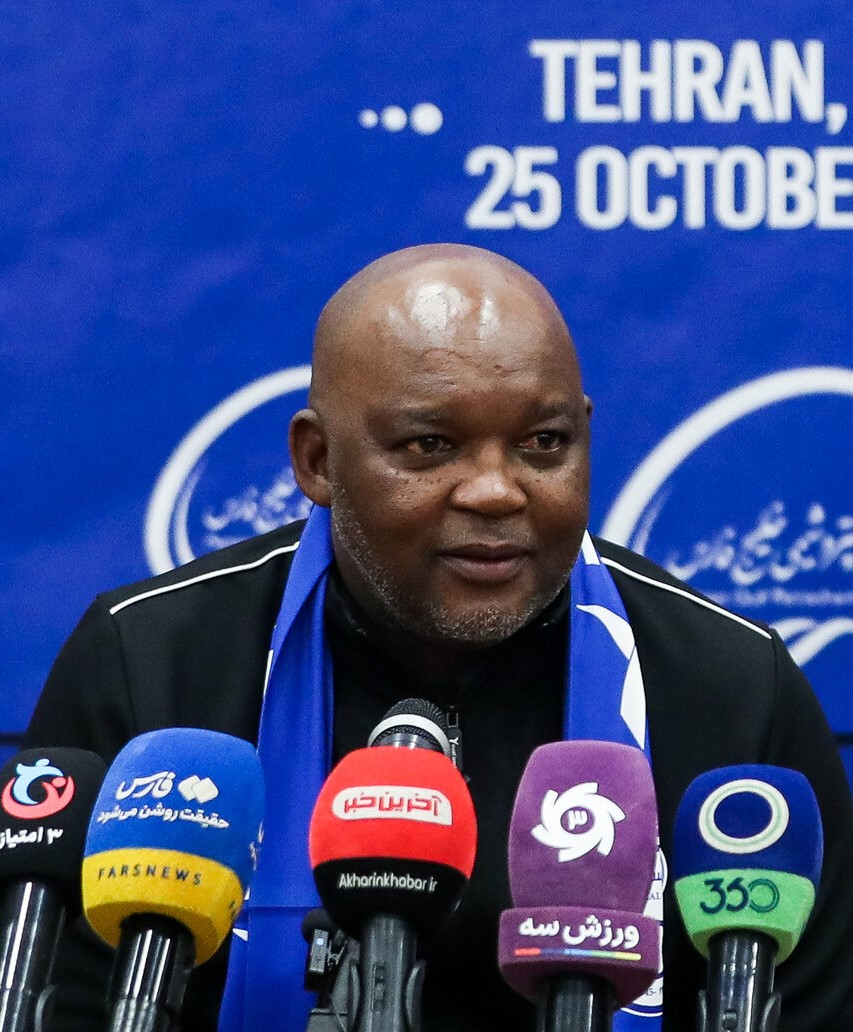
- Mosimane in 2024

Personal information
- Full name: Pitso John Hamilton Mosimane
- Date of birth: 26 July 1964 (age 62)
- Place of birth: Kagiso, Gauteng, South Africa
- Position: Midfielder

Team information
- Current team: South Africa (head coach)

Youth career
- Rockville Hungry Lions

Senior career*
| Years | Team | Apps | (Gls) |
| 1982–1983 | Jomo Cosmos | 27 | (7) |
| 1984 | Mamelodi Sundowns | 31 | (11) |
| 1985–1986 | Jomo Cosmos | 29 | (20) |
| 1987 | Mamelodi Sundowns | 9 | (0) |
| 1988 | Jomo Cosmos | 14 | (11) |
| 1989 | Orlando Pirates | 0 | (0) |
| 1989–1995 | Ionikos | 34 | (5) |
| 1995 | KFC Rita Berlaar | 37 | (15) |
| 1996 | Al Sadd | 12 | (0) |

International career
| 1993–1994 | South Africa | 4 | (1) |

Managerial career
- 2001–2006: Supersport United
- 2010–2012: South Africa
- 2012–2020: Mamelodi Sundowns
- 2020–2022: Al Ahly Cairo
- 2022–2023: Al Ahli Jeddah
- 2023: Al Wahda
- 2024: Abha
- 2024–2025: Esteghlal
- 2026–: South Africa
- * Club domestic league appearances and goals

Pitso John Hamilton Mosimane (born 26 July 1964) is a South African former professional football player and current manager of the South Africa national soccer team.

== Playing career ==
Mosimane started his senior career at Jomo Cosmos, then he played for Mamelodi Sundowns and Orlando Pirates, before joining Greek club Ionikos to play under coach Nikos Alefantos. He later joined Belgian team KFC Rita Berlaar and Qatari club Al Sadd.

== Coaching career ==
Mosimane was an assistant coach to the under-11 players during his tenure with the Belgian club KFC Rita Berlaar, then he returned to South Africa to coach Mamelodi Sundowns reserves. The late Ted Dumitru inspired him to become a coach.

=== Supersport United ===
Mosimane joined Supersport United as an assistant coach to Bruce Grobbelaar, then he became the head coach from 2001 until 2007, where he finished second in 2001–02 and 2002–03 in the Premier Soccer League.

=== South Africa national team ===
Mosimane served as the caretaker coach of the South African national team, nicknamed as Bafana Bafana, for seven games in 2007, prior to the appointment of Carlos Alberto Parreira as head coach of the national team, whom Mosimane served as an assistant coach under during the 2010 FIFA World Cup. He also served as assistant to Joel Santana during the 2009 FIFA Confederations Cup, Parreira's successor and later predecessor.

On 15 July 2010, Mosimane was named as the new head coach of South Africa and was handed a four-year contract. He won his first game in charge in a 1–0 win over World Cup quarter-finalists Ghana. South Africa failed to qualify for the 2012 African Cup of Nations after Mosimane mistakenly played for a draw in the final qualifier against Sierra Leone, when in fact a victory was required.

On 8 August 2026 Mosemane was again named the head coach of South African national soccer team filling the position after Hugo Broos's departure. This was after some negotiations regarding his salary where SAFA was reporterdly offering him 5 million Rands a year but both parties eventually agreed on 10 Million rands a year.

=== Mamelodi Sundowns ===
In 2012, Mosimane became the manager of Mamelodi Sundowns. He won the 2016 CAF Champions League with Mamelodi Sundowns after defeating Egypt's Zamalek 3–1 on aggregate, making them the 2nd South African side to win it after Orlando Pirates in 1995.

In December 2016, Mosimane was ranked as the 10th best coach in the world for 2016, according to the International Federation of Football History and Statistics (IFFHS).

On 5 January 2017, Mosimane won the Coach of the Year accolade at the 2016 Glo-CAF awards in Abuja, Nigeria after guiding Mamelodi Sundowns to league glory in 2015–16 and claiming the Telkom Knockout trophy which meant Mosimane stood alone as the only coach to have made a clean sweep of all domestic trophies in the PSL era.

On 6 April 2019, Mosimane led his team Mamelodi Sundowns to a 5–0 win against Egyptian club Al Ahly in the 2018–19 CAF Champions League quarter-finals, in which he won 5–1 on aggregate to reach the semi-finals.

Mosimane is generally regarded as the most successful manager in South African football history, winning five ABSA Premiership titles with Mamelodi Sundowns. In late September 2020, Mosimane resigned as Mamelodi Sundowns coach.

=== Al Ahly ===
On 30 September 2020, Mosimane was announced to be the head coach of Al Ahly. He was the first non-Egyptian African to manage the club.

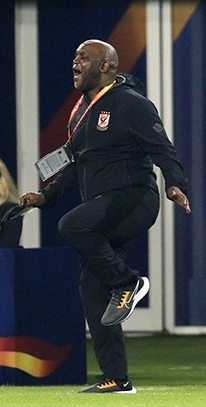
Mosimane with Al Ahly in 2021 FIFA Club World Cup

On 27 November 2020, Mosimane led Al Ahly to their 9th CAF Champions league title, after winning the 2020 final against their rivals Zamalek, and to qualify to the 2020 FIFA Club World Cup, where they eventually finished in third place after beating Palmeiras on penalties. On 6 December 2020, he led Al Ahly to win the Egyptian Cup. In May 2021, he guided the football club to win the African Super Cup against RS Berkane in Doha, Qatar.

On 17 July 2021, Al Ahly won their second CAF Champions league title under Mosimane and their 10th in total after a 3–0 win over Kaizer Chiefs in the final. Rory Smith argued that this eight-month tenure, in which Al Ahly won three trophies, made Mosimane one of the best managers in world football for the year. In December 2021, he won another African Super Cup in Qatar against Raja Casablanca. On 13 June 2022, Al Ahly accepted Mosimane's request to step down as their manager.

=== Al-Ahli Jeddah ===
On 25 September 2022, Mosimane was appointed as manager of Saudi Arabian club Al-Ahli Jeddah. He left in June 2023 after guiding them to promotion, and had claimed that he and his technical staff had not been paid since January.

=== Al Wahda ===
On 18 June 2023, shortly after his departure from Al Ahli Jeddah, Mosimane joined Abu Dhabi side Al Wahda along with his technical staff. Later that year, on 10 November, Al-Wahda announced the terminated of contract with Mosimane by mutual consent.

=== Abha ===
On 26 January 2024, Mosimane joined Saudi Arabia club Abha on a four-month contract which would take him to the end of the season.

=== Esteghlal ===
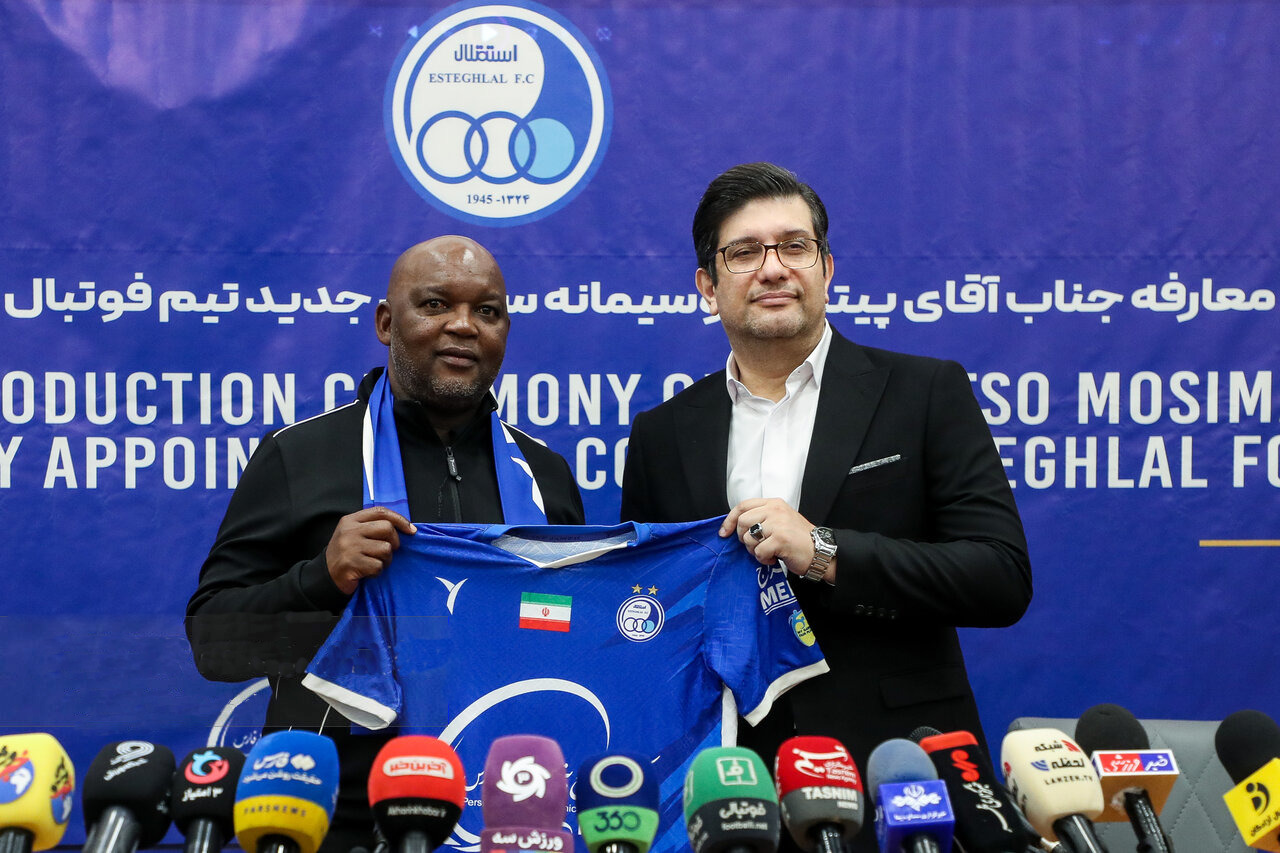
Mosimane along with Farshid Samiei in his introductory press conference as Esteghlal manager

On 18 October 2024, Mosimane was appointed coach of Iranian club Esteghlal in the Persian Gulf Pro League. He terminated his contract on 28 January 2025 with Esteghlal due to financial problems.

== Playing statistics ==
Appearances and goals by national team and year
| National team | Year | Apps | Goals |
|---|---|---|---|
| South Africa | 1993 | 2 | 1 |
| South Africa | 1994 | 2 | 0 |
| Total | | 4 | 1 |

== Managerial statistics ==
As of match played 17 November 2026

| Team | From | To | Record | | | | |
| Team | From | To | G | W | D | L | Win % |
|---|---|---|---|---|---|---|---|
| SuperSport United | 1 July 2001 | 30 June 2006 | 184 | 83 | 53 | 48 | 45.11 |
South Africa
| South Africa | 15 July 2010 | 5 June 2012 | 17 | 6 | 8 | 3 | 35.29 |
| Mamelodi Sundowns | 2 December 2012 | 30 September 2020 | 332 | 187 | 78 | 67 | 56.33 |
| Al Ahly | 30 September 2020 | 13 June 2022 | 97 | 65 | 22 | 10 | 67.01 |
| Al-Ahli | 25 September 2022 | 13 June 2023 | 29 | 19 | 7 | 3 | 65.52 |
| Al Wahda | 18 June 2023 | 10 November 2023 | 14 | 8 | 1 | 5 | 57.14 |
| Abha | 11 January 2024 | 30 June 2024 | 15 | 5 | 3 | 7 | 33.33 |
| Esteghlal | 24 October 2024 | 26 January 2025 | 15 | 3 | 8 | 4 | 20.00 |
| South Africa | 8 August 2026 | present | 5 | 4 | 1 | 0 | 80.00 |
| Total | | | 708 | 380 | 181 | 147 | 53.67 |

== Honours ==
=== Player ===
Ionikos

- Beta Ethniki: 1993–94

=== Manager ===
Supersport United

- Nedbank Cup: 2005
- SAA Super Eight Cup: 2004

Mamelodi Sundowns

- Premier Soccer League: 2013–14, 2015–16, 2017–18, 2018–19, 2019–20
- Nedbank Cup: 2014–15, 2019–20
- Telkom Knockout: 2015, 2019
- CAF Champions League: 2016
- CAF Super Cup: 2017

Al Ahly

- Egyptian Premier League: 2019–20
- Egypt Cup: 2019–20
- CAF Champions League: 2019–20, 2020–21
- CAF Super Cup: 2021 (May), 2021 (Dec)

Al-Ahli

- Saudi First Division League: 2022–23

=== Individual ===
- PSL Coach of the Season: 2013–14, 2015–16, 2017–18, 2018–19, 2019–20
- CAF Coach of the Year: 2016
- In August 2024 Mosimane was conferred with an honorary degree by the University of Johannesburg for remarkable contribution to sports and leadership.
