= Bill Baxter (Scottish footballer) =

Scottish footballer and manager

Personal information
- Full name: William Baxter
- Date of birth: 21 September 1924
- Place of birth: Methil, Scotland
- Date of death: 9 November 2002 (aged 78)
- Place of death: Leven, Scotland
- Position: Wing half

Youth career
- 1939–1945: Wolverhampton Wanderers

Senior career*
Years	Team	Apps	(Gls)
1945–1953	Wolverhampton Wanderers	43	(1)
1953–1957	Aston Villa	98	(6)

Managerial career
- 1969–1970: East Fife
- 1970–1971: Raith Rovers
- * Club domestic league appearances and goals

William Baxter (21 September 1924 – 9 November 2002) was a Scottish footballer who played as a wing half for Midlands clubs Wolverhampton Wanderers and Aston Villa.

== Biography ==
Baxter joined Wolves as a member of the groundstaff upon leaving school in 1939. After guesting for Leicester City, Mansfield Town and Notts County during wartime, he signed professional forms at Molineux in September 1945. He made his debut on 4 December 1948 in a 1–0 win over Everton.

Although never a regular starter for Wolves, he made five appearances in 1953–54, the season of the club's first championship. Lacking playing time for Wolves, he moved to Midlands neighbours Aston Villa in November 1953.

Baxter made over 100 appearances for Villa before retiring in summer 1957. He stayed with the club to serve them as coach and assistant manager until 1967. He then moved back to his native Scotland, where he had short spells in charge of both East Fife and Raith Rovers.

His son Stuart Baxter is a former football player and a manager, and grandson Lee Baxter a former player and now a goalkeeping coach.

== Honours ==
- Football League First Division: 1953–54
