= Eddie Lewis (footballer, born 1935) =

English footballer (1935–2011)

- Lewis with Manchester United

Personal information
- Full name: Edward Lewis
- Date of birth: 3 January 1935
- Place of birth: Manchester, England
- Date of death: 2 May 2011 (aged 76)
- Place of death: Johannesburg, South Africa
- Height: 5 ft 11 in (1.80 m)
- Positions: Forward; full-back

Youth career
- 1947–1952: Manchester United

Senior career*
Years	Team	Apps	(Gls)
1952–1955	Manchester United	20	(9)
1955–1956	Preston North End	12	(2)
1956–1958	West Ham United	31	(12)
1958–1964	Leyton Orient	143	(5)
1964–1966	Folkestone Town		

Managerial career
- 1966–1968: Clapton
- 1968–1970: Ford Sports
- 1973–1974: Kaizer Chiefs
- 1974–1979: Wits
- 1979–1980: Kaizer Chiefs
- 1980–1982: Computer Stars
- 1985: Kaizer Chiefs
- 1987–1988: Giant Blackpool
- 1989–1992: Moroka Swallows
- 1992–1997: Wits
- 1997–1999: Manning Rangers
- 1999–2000: AmaZulu
- 2007–2011: Moroka Swallows (technical advisor)
- * Club domestic league appearances and goals

Edward Lewis (3 January 1935 – 2 May 2011) was an English footballer who played as a forward and later as a full-back. Born in Manchester, he played for Goslings before joining the now-famous Manchester United Junior Athletic Club (MUJAC). He made his debut for Manchester United in 1952, but struggled to nail down a regular place in the starting XI and was sold to Preston North End in 1955.

A year later, he transferred to West Ham United, with Frank O'Farrell moving in the opposite direction. In 1958, he was part of the West Ham team that finished on top of the Second Division before joining Leyton Orient. At Leyton Orient, Lewis was converted from his former position at centre-forward to become the team's regular left-back, and he was part of the team that was promoted to the First Division in 1962 and relegated just a year later. In May 1964, Lewis joined Folkestone Town, before embarking on a short managerial career with Clapton and Ford Sports.

In 1970, Lewis emigrated to South Africa, where he was involved in coaching several sides, including Wits University, Kaizer Chiefs and Moroka Swallows. He also worked as an analyst for SuperSport. He contracted cancer in his later years and died in May 2011.

== Career ==
Born in Manchester, Lewis was one of the original Busby Babes. He played for Goslings and then for the Manchester United Junior Athletic Club (MUJAC), joining the Old Trafford ground staff in the 1947–48 season.

He made 24 appearances for United during the 1950s and scored 11 goals, but was never a regular first-team player due to fierce competition from Bobby Charlton, Liam Whelan, Tommy Taylor and Dennis Viollet.

In 1956 Lewis signed for West Ham United from Preston North End in a swap deal that saw Frank O'Farrell move in the other direction. He helped West Ham win promotion during the 1957–58 season, and did the same with Leyton Orient in 1961–62. He was converted from centre forward to full back with Leyton Orient, and probably played his best seasons in that position. He went on to play for Folkestone Town and later managed Clapton and Ford Sports in the Greater London League.

Lewis emigrated to South Africa in 1970 and – after a short spell selling insurance – he spent time as a part-time coach of Primary School Soccer at Glenhazel Primary school in the 1980s, and Wits University, Kaizer Chiefs, Giant Blackpool, Moroka Swallows, Manning Rangers, Free State Stars and AmaZulu. He also worked as an analyst for the TV sports station SuperSport and also for PA Sports.

In July 2007, 72-year-old Lewis was appointed as a technical advisor for Moroka Swallows under their new manager Ian Gorowa, a former Zimbabwe international striker.

After a long battle with cancer, Lewis died in a Johannesburg hospital on 2 May 2011.

== Honours ==
Moroka Swallows

- Bob Save Superbowl: 1989
