= Roy Matthews =

Scottish footballer

Personal information
- Full name: Roy Henderson Matthews
- Date of birth: 29 March 1940 (age 86)
- Place of birth: Slough, England
- Position: Inside right

Senior career*
Years	Team	Apps	(Gls)
1956–1957	Arbroath Vics		
1957–1967	Charlton Athletic	160	(46)
1967–1975	Arcadia Shepherds	?	(?)

Managerial career
- 1987: Jomo Cosmos
- Supersport United
- * Club domestic league appearances and goals

Roy Henderson Matthews (born 29 March 1940) is a Scottish footballer who played as an inside right in the Football League.

As a player, he won a treble with Arcadia Shepherds in 1974. NFL Championship, NFL Castle Cup and the NFL UTC Bowl Cup.

As a manager, he led Jomo Cosmos to the National Soccer League title in 1987. The team lost the Mainstay Cup final to Mamelodi Sundowns in 1986.

== Honours ==
Arcadia Shepherds

- NFL Championship: 1974
- NFL Castle Cup; 1974
- NFL UTC Bowl Cup: 1974

Jomo Cosmos

- NSL Championship: 1987
- Bob Save Superbowl: 1990
