= Fetsi Molatedi =

South African soccer player

Personal information
- Full name: Johannes Malefetsane Molatedi
- Date of birth: 6 July 1960 (age 66)
- Place of birth: South Africa
- Position: Midfielder

Youth career
- Phiri Eleven

Senior career*
Years	Team	Apps	(Gls)
1981–1983	Moroka Swallows	50	(10)
1984–1994	Kaizer Chiefs	186	(57)
1995–1999	Seven Stars	78	(20)
2000	D'Alberton Callies	16	(3)
Total		330	(90)
- * Club domestic league appearances and goals

Johannes Malefetsane Fetsi "Chippa" Molatedi (born 6 July 1960) is a South African former soccer player who played as a midfielder for Moroka Swallows, Kaizer Chiefs, Seven Stars and D'Alberton Callies.

== Career ==
Molatedi began playing for Swallows in January 1981. After he won the Mainstay Cup in 1983 he requested a transfer to the club he supported as a boy, Kaizer Chiefs.

With an increasing number of enemies and death threats, he was flown to the coast in Durban by Kaizer Motaung, who arranged for him a unit at Elangeni Hotel where he stayed for 3 weeks. Motaung struck a record deal with a transfer fee of R45 000.

He played for Chiefs for ten seasons giving defenders headaches with Trevor Mthimkhulu where he won the quadruple in 1984.

His most memorable match would be the Mainstay Cup semi final against African Wanderers where came on as a substitute in the second half trailing 1-0 at Ellis Park. Molatedi attended his grandmother's funeral earlier that day and scored a hat trick to win 3-1.

== Retirement ==
Molatedi's injury in 1987 changed his game drastically, he would rush and never waited for his recovery. At Seven Stars his star began to wane and retired in 2000. He coached amateur teams in Matatiele and returned to Johannesburg in 2002. He runs the Ormonde Soccer Academy with players from Xavier Reef and Ormonde View.

== Personal life ==
He married Rose in 1980. He lives in Ormonde.
