= 1990 Bob Save Superbowl =

South African football tournament season

1990 Bob Save Super Bowl
Tournament details
- Country: South Africa

Final positions
- Champions: Jomo Cosmos
- Runners-up: AmaZulu

The 1990 Bob Save Superbowl was the 1990 season of the South African club soccer knockout tournament, then known as the Bob Save Superbowl for sponsorship reasons.

It was won by Jomo Cosmos, who defeated AmaZulu 1–0 in the final. Cosmos were coached by Roy Matthews and were in the first of their three successive finals.

== Results ==
=== Final ===
Jomo Cosmos	1–0	AmaZulu
Salter 87'
