= 1991 Bob Save Superbowl =

South African football tournament season

1991 Bob Save Super Bowl
Tournament details
- Country: South Africa

Final positions
- Champions: Moroka Swallows
- Runners-up: Jomo Cosmos

The 1991 Bob Save Superbowl was the 1991 season of the South African club soccer knockout tournament, then known as the Bob Save Superbowl for sponsorship reasons.

It was won by Moroka Swallows, who defeated defending champions Jomo Cosmos 2–1 in the final. Cosmos were in the second of their three successive finals.

== Results ==
=== Final ===
Moroka Swallows	2–1	Jomo Cosmos
