= 2003 ABSA Cup =

South African football tournament season

Tournament details
- Country: South Africa

Final positions
- Champions: Santos
- Runners-up: Ajax Cape Town

The 2003 ABSA Cup was the 2003 season of the South African club football (soccer) knockout tournament, and the first under its then sponsored name, the ABSA Cup.

The final was a Cape derby played at the Athlone Stadium, and was won by Santos, who defeated Ajax Cape Town 2–0.

== Results ==
=== Final ===
31 May 2003

Santos	2–0	Ajax Cape Town
Arendse 18'; Moloi 22'

Athlone Stadium, Cape Town
Attendance: 12,000
