= 1989 Bob Save Superbowl =

South African football tournament season

1990 Bob Save Super Bowl
Tournament details
- Country: South Africa

Final positions
- Champions: Moroka Swallows
- Runners-up: Mamelodi Sundowns

The 1989 Bob Save Superbowl was the 1989 season of the South African club soccer knockout tournament, then known as the Bob Save Superbowl for sponsorship reasons.

It was won by Moroka Swallows, who defeated Mamelodi Sundowns 5–1 in the replayed final. Swallows were coached by Eddie Lewis.

Swallows were leading the first final 1-0 until the 89th minute, when a back pass by captain Goodman Hlongwane was intercepted. In the replay, Lewis moved Owen Da Gama to striker, and dropped Les Grobler to midfield. The Sundowns defence were confused, following Grobler deep into midfield, with Da Gama exploiting the gaps to score two goals.

== Results ==
=== Final ===
Moroka Swallows	1–1	Mamelodi Sundowns

=== Final (replay) ===
Moroka Swallows	5–1	Mamelodi Sundowns
