= 2001 Bob Save Superbowl =

South African football tournament season

2001 Bob Save Super Bowl
Tournament details
- Country: South Africa

Final positions
- Champions: Santos
- Runners-up: Mamelodi Sundowns

The 2001 Bob Save Super Bowl was the 2001 season of the South African club football (soccer) knockout tournament, and the last under its then sponsored name, the Bob Save Superbowl.

The final was played prior to the replay of the Soweto Derby, abandoned earlier in the season due to the Ellis Park Stadium disaster.

Santos, led by Clive Barker, defeated Mamelodi Sundowns 1–0, earning a prize of R1.5 million. This was Santos' first major trophy in the PSL era.

== Results ==
=== Final ===
9 June 2001

Santos	1–0	Mamelodi Sundowns
Arendse 13'

FNB Stadium, Johannesburg
