= Lee Baxter (footballer) =

Swedish footballer (born 1976)

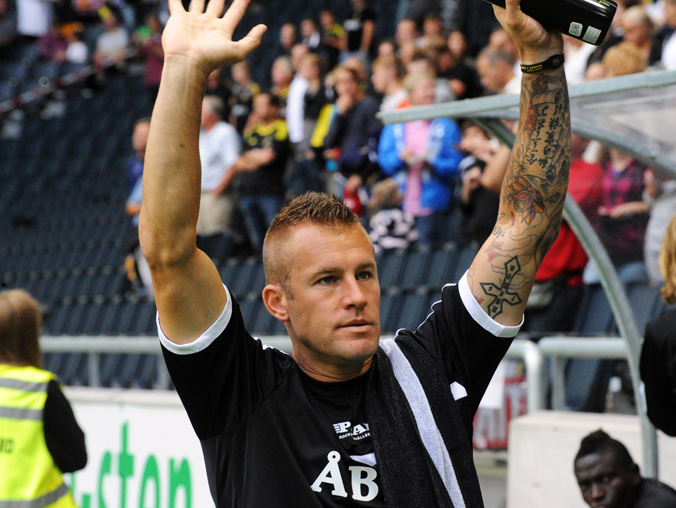
- Baxter in 2013

Personal information
- Full name: Lee Stuart Baxter
- Date of birth: 17 June 1976 (age 50)
- Place of birth: Helsingborg, Sweden
- Position: Goalkeeper

Team information
- Current team: IFK Göteborg (goalkeeper coach)

Youth career
- 1990–1992: Blackburn Rovers
- 1992: BK Astrio
- 1992–1994: Sanfrecce Hiroshima

Senior career*
Years	Team	Apps	(Gls)
1995–1997	Vissel Kobe	0	(0)
1997–1998	Rangers	0	(0)
1998–2001	AIK	8	(0)
2001–2003	Malmö FF	17	(0)
2003–2004	Sheffield United	1	(0)
2004	IFK Göteborg	0	(0)
2004–2005	Bodens BK	17	(0)
2005–2006	Malmö FF	0	(0)
2006–2007	Landskrona BoIS	41	(0)
2007–2016	AIK	11	(0)
2016	AGF	0	(0)
Total		95	(0)
- * Club domestic league appearances and goals

Lee Stuart Baxter (born 17 June 1976) is a Swedish football goalkeeper and coach who has played for clubs in Sweden and England and trained goalkeepers in several international clubs. He moved from Malmö FF to Sheffield United in 2003, to cover a goalkeeping crisis. His only appearance was The Blades Football League match against Burnley on 6 December 2003. He was deemed to be at fault for two of the goals and was subbed at half time for Alan Fettis.

Baxter only played for Sheffield United in England, before moving back to Sweden with IFK Göteborg.

He is the son of football manager Stuart Baxter, and grandson of footballer Bill Baxter.

Following his playing career, he took on the role of goalkeeper coach at AIK. In 2015, he moved to Turkish Super Lig team, Gençlerbirliği S.K. His time at the club was cut short, following the dismissal of the head coach. Later he worked as the Head Goalkeeper coach at Supersport United, in the South African Premier Soccer League (PSL). He was later goalkeeper coach for AGF, Kaizer Chiefs, and IFK Göteborg.
