= 2014–15 Nedbank Cup =

ke yona (the one)

Tournament details
- Country: South Africa
- Teams: 16 (preliminary round – 8 qualifiers); 32 (main tournament); 40 (total)

Final positions
- Champions: Mamelodi Sundowns 4th title
- Runners-up: Ajax Cape Town

The Nedbank Cup is a South African club football (soccer) tournament. The knockout tournament, based on the English FA Cup format, was one of a weak opponent facing a stronger one. The competition was sponsored by ABSA until 2007, after which Nedbank took over sponsorship.

Mamelodi Sundowns, the winner of the 2014–15 Nedbank Cup, qualified for the 2016 CAF Confederation Cup.

== Format ==
The 16 Premier Soccer League clubs, 8 National First Division teams, as well as 8 teams from the amateur ranks compete for the title. The winner also qualifies for the CAF Confederation Cup.

The teams are not seeded at any stage, and the first 16 sides drawn out of the hat receive a home-ground advantage. There are no longer any replays in the tournament, and any games which end in a draw after 90 minutes are subject to 30 minutes extra time followed by penalties if necessary.

== Results ==
=== Final ===
Mamelodi Sundowns	0–0	Ajax Cape Town
	Report
Penalties
	4–3
