= 2004 ABSA Cup =

South African football tournament season

Tournament details
- Country: South Africa

Final positions
- Champions: Moroka Swallows (4th title)

The 2004 ABSA Cup was the 2004 season of the South African club football (soccer) knockout tournament, known at the time under its then sponsored name, the ABSA Cup.

It was won by Moroka Swallows, who defeated Manning Rangers 3–1 in the final. This was Swallow's first major trophy in thirteen years.

== Results ==
=== Final ===
12 June 2004

| Moroka Swallows | 3–1 | Manning Rangers |
|---|---|---|
| Ndlela 12'; Ngobeni 85'; Lota 89' | | Jordan 8' |

Free State Stadium, Bloemfontein

== Prize money ==
Swallows earned R1.5 million for winning.
