= Edries Burton =

South African soccer player

Personal information
- Date of birth: 13 December 1968 (age 57)
- Place of birth: Cape Town, South Africa
- Position: Central defender

Youth career
- Moonlighters AFC

Senior career*
Years	Team	Apps	(Gls)
1989–1991	Santos Cape Town	112	(3)
1991–1994	Cape Town Spurs	74	(2)
1994–1997	AmaZulu	92	(6)
1997–2007	Santos Cape Town	277	(7)
Total		555	(18)

International career
1996–2002	South Africa	2	(0)
- * Club domestic league appearances and goals

Edries Burton (born 13 December 1968) is a South African former soccer player who played as a defender. He played professionally for Santos Cape Town, Cape Town Spurs and AmaZulu.

== Early life ==
He matriculated at Belgravia High School in 1987, Lyle Lakay also matriculated at the same school. He also studied at UNISA

== Club career ==
Burton joined Santos from amateur club Moonlighters AFC in 1989 and featured regularly when Santos won the Federation Professional League in 1990. He later joined Cape Town Spurs and later won a league and cup double that won the 1995 National Soccer League and the BobSave titles in 1995. When he was at Cape Town Spurs in 1992, he also worked as a financial manager at Josman and Seidel until late into his Amazulu spell in 1996. In his second spell with Santos, he led Santos to the BobSave Knockout Cup (2000/01), PSL league title (2001/02), BP Top Eight Cup (2002) and Absa Knockout Cup (2002/03). When Burton retired in 2007, Santos boss Goolam Allie disclosed that no other Santos player will wear jersey number 23 which was worn by Burton.

== After retirement ==
Shortly after retiring he became the Chief Operations Manager at Santos. In 2012, he took up a Financial and Accounting course at Wits Business School Burton quit as the COO of Santos on 6 August 2014. On 7 August 2014 he became the CEO of National First Division side, Cape Town All Stars.

After resigning from Cape Town All Stars FC, Edries was appointed as Chief Executive Officer at National First Division side, Vasco da Gama (South Africa) in 2015. Vasco da Gama (South Africa) was later renamed in 2016 to Stellenbosch F.C.
