= 2007 ABSA Cup =

Tournament details
- Country: South Africa

Final positions
- Champions: Ajax Cape Town (2nd title)

The 2007 ABSA Cup was the 2007 season of the South African club football (soccer) knockout tournament, the ABSA Cup, and the final season under its then sponsored name.

It was won by Ajax Cape Town, who defeated Mamelodi Sundowns 2 – 0 in the final. This was Ajax's second win in the competition, having won the double in 1995 (as Cape Town Spurs).

== Results ==
=== Final ===
26 May 2007

Ajax Cape Town	2–0	Mamelodi Sundowns
Moon 16'; Cale 79'

Kings Park Stadium, Durban
