= Thulasizwe Mbuyane =

South African soccer player

Personal information
- Full name: Thulasizwe Moses Mbuyane
- Date of birth: 13 August 1983 (age 43)
- Place of birth: Mamelodi, South Africa
- Height: 1.73 m (5 ft 8 in)
- Position: Midfielder

Youth career
- Mandla Professionals
- Alba Chiefs
- AC Milan (South Africa)
- Jusbem United

Senior career*
Years	Team	Apps	(Gls)
2004–2007	Ga-Rankuwa United		
2007–2008	Free State Stars	22	(6)
2008–2014	Orlando Pirates	95	(19)
2014	Mpumalanga Black Aces	3	(1)
2014-2015	Royal Eagles	5	(1)

International career
2008–2010	South Africa	6	(1)
- * Club domestic league appearances and goals

Thulasizwe Mbuyane (born 13 August 1983 in Mamelodi) is a retired South African footballer, who played for Premier Soccer League clubs Free State Stars, Orlando Pirates and Mpumalanga Black Aces and the South African national squad as a midfielder.

Mbuyane was traded to Orlando Pirates from Free State Stars in a swap deal taking Paulos Masehe in the opposite direction during the closed season before the 2008/09 Premier Soccer League season.

On 21 January 2014, it was announced that Mbuyane joined Mpumalanga Black Aces on a two-and-a-half-year deal, ending a six-season stint at Orlando Pirates.

== International career ==
Thulasizwe Mbuyane played for the national team in March 2008 when he was called in as a substitute.

=== International goals ===
#	Date	Venue	Opponent	Score	Result	Competition
1	27 January 2010	Durban, South Africa	Zimbabwe	2–0	3–0	Friendly match

== Honours ==
Orlando Pirates

- Premier Soccer League
  - Winners : 2010/2011, 2011/2012
  - Runners up : 2008/2009
- Nedbank Cup: 2011
- Telkom knockout: 2011
- MTN 8: 2010, 2011
- CAF Champions League
  - Runners up : 2013
- Carling Blaclk label Cup: 2010, 2011, 2014
