= Lerato Manzini =

South African soccer player

Personal information
- Full name: Lerato David Manzini
- Date of birth: 14 August 1991 (age 35)
- Place of birth: Welkom, South Africa
- Position: Forward

Youth career
- 2006–2010: Harmony Academy

Senior career*
Years	Team	Apps	(Gls)
2010–2014	Bloemfontein Celtic	48	(11)
2010–2011	→ Blackburn Rovers (loan)		
2014–2015	→ SuperSport United (loan)	5	(0)
2015–2019	Chippa United	66	(17)
2020–2021	Cape Town Spurs	6	(2)
2021	Bizana Pondo Chiefs	11	(2)
2021	Free State Stars	9	(0)
2022	Summerfield Dynamos		
2022–2023	Casric Stars		
2023–2024	Al-Qasim		
- * Club domestic league appearances and goals

Lerato Manzini (born 14 August 1991) is a South African former professional soccer player who played as a forward. He played in South Africa with Bloemfontein Celtic, Blackburn Rovers, SuperSport United, Chippa United, Cape Town Spurs, Bizana Pondo Chiefs, Free State Stars, Summerfield Dynamos and Casric Stars, and in Iraq with Al-Qasim.

== Career ==
Manzini was born in Welkom. He played junior football with Welkom Juventus before being scouted by Harmony Sports Academy in 2006. He was later signed by Bloemfontein Celtic, and had a loan spell with Blackburn Rovers during the 2010–11 season.

In June 2014, Manzini joined SuperSport United on a season-long loan, with the option of making the deal permanent, as part of the transfer bringing Bevan Fransman to Bloemfontein Celtic. He struggled for game time at SuperSport United, having made just five league appearances, and returned from loan early in January 2015, and was released by the club at the end of the season, after making 48 appearances and scoring 11 goals across four seasons.

In July 2015, Manzini joined Chippa United. In January 2017, Chippa United extended his contract, which was due to expire that summer, to summer 2018. At the end of December 2019, he was released. Across his spell at Chippa United, he made 66 appearances and scored 17 goals.

He signed for Cape Town Spurs in October 2020, where he scored twice in six National First Division games, and then Bizana Pondo Chiefs in March 2021, but after their relegation from the National First Division at the end of the season, he joined Free State Stars in summer 2021. He then had spells with Summerfield Dynamos and Casric Stars in South Africa, and Al-Qasim in Iraq before retiring. Since retiring as a player, he founded the Welkom Academy in January 2025.
