= Roger De Sá =

South African soccer player and coach (born 1964)

Personal information
- Full name: Rogério Paulo Cesar de Sá
- Date of birth: 1 October 1964 (age 62)
- Place of birth: Lourenço Marques, Portuguese Mozambique
- Height: 1.83 m (6 ft 0 in)
- Position: Goalkeeper

Team information
- Current team: Cape Town Spurs (coach)

Youth career
- União Desportiva Joanesburgo

Senior career*
Years	Team	Apps	(Gls)
1984–1985	Kwikot Benoni		
1985–1987	Defence Forces		
1987–1989	Jeppe		
1989–1995	Moroka Swallows		
1995–1997	Mamelodi Sundowns		
1997–2001	Wits University		

International career
1993	South Africa	1	(0)

Managerial career
- 2001–2005: Wits University
- 2005–2007: Santos
- 2007–2012: Wits University
- 2012–2014: Orlando Pirates
- 2014–2016: Ajax Cape Town
- 2017–2018: Platinum Stars F.C.
- 2018–2021: Cape Umoya
- 2021: Cape Town All Stars
- * Club domestic league appearances and goals

Rogério Paulo Cesar de Sá (born 1 October 1964) is a South African soccer coach and former player who played as a goalkeeper. He has been a coach for Cape Town Spurs since 2026.

De Sá is also one of the handful of South Africans who have represented their country in three different sports – soccer, basketball and indoor soccer.

== Club career ==
De Sá started his professional career after Kwikot Benoni coach Jingles Pereira, who knew De Sá's father, knew that the goalkeeper was not playing professional football, promptly signing the player.

During his career, De Sá played for major South African clubs Moroka Swallows and Mamelodi Sundowns, both of which he captained as well.

== International career ==
De Sá was capped only once in his career during a 1994 African Cup of Nations qualification match against Zambia. He was part of the 1996 African Nations Cup-winning squad.

== Coaching career ==
De Sá began his coaching career in 2001 at Bidvest Wits, and would remain in charge for four years.

De Sá rejoined The Students in June 2007 after an absence of two years which he spent coaching Engen Santos.

In September 2012, De Sá was appointed the coach of Orlando Pirates. He was chosen as PSL Coach of the Season after the 2002–03 season.

On 31 January 2014, De Sá resigned as coach of Orlando Pirates.

Da Sá was appointed Ajax Cape Town coach in 2014, but stepped down from the position after a winless start to the 2016/17 PSL season.

In January 2017, De Sá was announced as Maritzburg United's manager, but he parted ways with the club in March of the same year.

On 8 September 2017, De Sá was named as the head coach of Platinum Stars after the departure of British coach Peter Butler.

He also acted as Bafana's goalkeeping coach during Carlos Queiroz's reign and, in September 2021, was recruited by Queiroz to join him as Assistant Coach to the Egyptian national football team. He continued with Queiroz as assistant coach of Iran for the 2022 FIFA World Cup.

In early 2023, De Sá was named as a coach to the Qatari national team, once again working alongside Queiroz. The three-and-a-half-year deal would see De Sá working with the team until at least July 2026.

In 2025 he was a coach at Cape Town City, before again joining Queiroz, becoming a coach with the Oman national team, and then assistant coach under Queiroz for Ghana at the 2026 World Cup.

De Sá joined Cape Town Spurs as Head Coach and Technical Director prior to the start of the 2026–27 SAFA Second Division.

== Honours ==
=== Player ===
South Africa

- 1996 African Cup of Nations

=== Coach ===
Wits University

- Nedbank Cup: 2009–10

Orlando Pirates

- Nedbank Cup: 2013–14
- Carling Black Label Cup: 2012, 2014
- CAF Champions League Runner-up: 2013

Ajax Cape Town

- MTN 8: 2015

== Sources ==
- Roger De Sa: Man of Action

DE SA, Roger with LANDHEER, Ernest (2003, South Africa Spearhead Press, ISBN 978-0-86486-470-3)
