= Gavin Hunt =

South African soccer player and manager

Personal information
- Full name: Gavin John Hunt
- Date of birth: 11 July 1964 (age 62)
- Place of birth: Cape Town, South Africa
- Position: Right-back

Team information
- Current team: Stellenbosch F.C. (head coach)

Youth career
- Rygersdal

Senior career*
| Years | Team | Apps | (Gls) |
| 1981–1994 | Hellenic | 302 | (6) |
| 1993 | Cape Town Spurs (loan) | 11 | (0) |
| Total | | 313 | (6) |

Managerial career
- 1995–1998: Seven Stars
- 1998–2001: Hellenic
- 2001–2002: Black Leopards
- 2002–2007: Moroka Swallows
- 2007–2013: SuperSport United
- 2013–2020: Bidvest Wits
- 2020–2021: Kaizer Chiefs
- 2021: Chippa United
- 2022–2025: SuperSport United
- 2025: Durban City
- 2026–: Stellenbosch FC
- * Club domestic league appearances and goals

Gavin John Hunt (born 11 July 1964) is a South African former football (soccer) player and coach who is the current manager of Stellenbosch.

A nuggety right-back, Hunt spent almost his entire playing career with Hellenic. However, his retirement came soon because of an achilles tendon injury and went straight into coaching.

== Managerial career ==
Hunt's greatest success came at SuperSport United, where he won three consecutive PSL championships from 2007-08 to 2009-10.

He previously managed Seven Stars, Hellenic FC, Black Leopards and Moroka Swallows.

On 28 May 2021 Kaizer Chiefs released him from his contract after a string of poor results with the club.

He managed newly promoted side Durban City in the first half of the 2025/26 season.

He was announced as the Stellenbosch coach after the departure of Steve Barker in December 2025.

== Honours ==
=== Moroka Swallows ===
- Nedbank Cup: 2004

=== SuperSport United ===
- Premiership: 2007-08, 2008-09, 2009-10
- Nedbank Cup: 2011-12

=== Bidvest Wits ===
- Premiership: 2016-17
- MTN 8: 2016
- Telkom Knockout: 2017

== See also ==
- List of football managers with the most matches
