= Santos F.C. (South Africa) =

Santos FC
- Full name: Santos Football Club
- Nickname: The People's Team
- Founded: 1982; 44 years ago
- Ground: Poplar Avenue, Thornton, Cape Town
- Capacity: 1,000
- Chairman: Goolam Allie
- League: ABC Motsepe League
- 2024–25: 2nd Stream B
- Website: www.santosfc.co.za
Home colours	Away colours

old logo (−2003)

old logo (2003–2011)

Santos Football Club or simply Santos is a South African professional soccer club based in the Lansdowne, a suburb of the city of Cape Town. It plays in the SAFA Second Division.

== History ==
The club was established in Heideveld on the Cape Flats in 1982 and was originally known as Lightbodys Santos FC, after its sponsor. During apartheid, it was renowned for the insistence on non-racial inclusivity, hence its nickname "The People's Team".

They played in the Federation Professional League (FPL), the only truly non-racial football body in the country from 1982 to 1990. They won the championship in 1983, 1984, 1986, 1987, 1988 and 1990 before joining the National Soccer League.

The PSL era began in 1996, with Santos earning promotion to the Premiership for the 1997–98 season. Santos tasted their first success in the new format of the league in 2001–02 when they surprisingly won the title under the mentorship of Gordon Igesund. This side featured players like Edries Burton, Andre Arendse, Musa Otieno and the club's all-time top goalscorer Jean-Marc Ithier. With the title win Santos became the first – and to date the only – team that was not a founder-member of the PSL Premiership to win the league.

They were also crowned Bob Save Super Bowl winners in 2001 and BP Top 8 winners in 2002.

Santos were relegated from the Premiership at the end of the 2011–12 season for the first time in the club's history. After finishing 15th in the league they entered the 2011–12 PSL Playoff Tournament where they were pitted against Chippa United and Thanda Royal Zulu. Heading into their final playoff game Santos needed a win over Chippa United to maintain their Premiership status but they were defeated 4–3 and subsequently relegated, with Chippa United taking their place in the PSL.

Santos were relegated from the National First Division at the end of the 2016–17 season. The club now plays in the Western Cape ABC Motsepe League.

In November 2025, Santos were expelled from the league. This came after SAFA excluded Santos from the Nedbank Cup over outstanding financial obligations. Santos had taken the matter to court, and SAFA were interdicted from going ahead with the Nedbank Cup fixture without Santos, and the matter referred to arbitration. SAFA then expelled Santos from the league. Santos appealed and won, and were reinstated in the league.

== Notable former coaches ==
- (Botswana) David Bright (2008–09)
- (Denmark) Roald Poulsen (2004)
- (Mauritius) Jean-Marc Ithier (2007–08)
- (Netherlands) Mart Nooij (2012)
- (South Africa) Clive Barker (2000–01, 2005)
- (South Africa) Gordon Igesund (2001–02)
- (South Africa) Roger De Sa (2005–07)
- (South Africa) Boebie Solomons (2003–04, 2009–11)
- (Turkey) Muhsin Ertugral (2003)

== Honours ==
- Premiership champions: 2001–02
- Bob Save Super Bowl/ABSA Cup winners: 2001, 2003
- FPL League champions: 1983, 1984, 1986, 1987, 1988, 1990
- FPL Cup winners: 1985, 88, 90
- Challenge Cup Winners: 1988
- BP Top 8 winners: 2002
- National First Division: 1996–97 (Western Cape Stream)

== International ==
- IFA Shield (IFA): (Note: Fourth oldest club tournament, organized by the Indian Association and played between Indian clubs and other invited ones.) 2008: Runners-up

== Club records ==
- Most starts: (South Africa) Edries Burton 409
- Most goals: (Mauritius) Jean-Marc Ithier 70
- Most capped player: (Kenya) Musa Otieno
- Most starts in a season: (South Africa) Cassiem Mohamed 44 (1993)
- Most goals in a season: (South Africa) Duncan Crowie 19 (1991)
- Record victory: 6–0 v Intercity Aces (6/3/99, Bob Save Super Bowl); vs Beau West City (26 February 2005, Absa Cup); vs Cemforce FC (12/3/05, Absa Cup); vs Island FC (11/3/06, Absa Cup)
- Record defeat: 1–7 v Mamelodi Sundowns (19 August 1998, PSL)

== League record ==
=== Premiership ===
- 1997–98 – 16th
- 1998–99 – 16th
- 1999–2000 – 11th
- 2000–01 – 5th
- 2001–02 – 1st
- 2002–03 – 9th
- 2003–04 – 6th
- 2004–05 – 12th
- 2005–06 – 8th
- 2006–07 – 10th
- 2007–08 – 3rd
- 2008–09 – 10th
- 2009–10 – 4th
- 2010–11 – 8th
- 2011–12 – 15th (relegated)

=== National First Division ===
- 2012–13 – 2nd
- 2013–14 – 5th
- 2014–15 – 13th
- 2015–16 – 11th
- 2016–17 – 16th (relegated)

=== SAFA Second Division (Western Cape) ===
- 2017–18 – 6th
- 2018–19 – 8th
- 2019–20 – 12th
- 2020–21 – Did not compete
- 2021–22 – 5th (Stream A)
- 2022–23 – 3rd (Stream A)
- 2023–24 – 4th (Stream A)
- 2024–25 – 2nd (Stream B)
