= Ted Dumitru =

Romanian football manager (1939–2016)

Personal information
- Full name: Dumitru Teodorescu
- Date of birth: 2 September 1939
- Place of birth: Bucharest, Kingdom of Romania
- Date of death: 26 May 2016 (aged 76)
- Place of death: Johannesburg, Gauteng, South Africa

Managerial career
- Years: Team
- 1966: Universitatea Craiova
- 1967–1968: Romania U-23
- 1969–1970: Altay Izmir
- 1970–1971: Beşiktaş
- 1971: Mersin İdmanyurdu
- 1971–1973: Texas Longhorns
- 1974–1975: Rochester Lancers
- 1976–1980: New York Apollo
- 1980–1982: Zambia
- 1983–1985: Swaziland
- 1985–1988: Kaizer Chiefs
- 1994–1995: Tractor Sazi
- 1997–1999: Mamelodi Sundowns
- 1999–2000: Orlando Pirates
- 2000: Manning Rangers
- 2000–2001: Namibia
- 2001–2002: Mamelodi Sundowns
- 2003–2005: Kaizer Chiefs
- 2005–2006: South Africa

Theodore "Ted" Dumitru (born Dumitru Teodorescu; 2 September 1939 – 26 May 2016) was a Romanian football manager who is best known for his time in South Africa. Dumitru was one of few coaches who have led South Africa's 'big three' clubs Kaizer Chiefs, Mamelodi Sundowns and Orlando Pirates.

Dumitru was brought to South Africa by the owner of Kaizer Chiefs, Kaizer Motaung, in 1985, Dumitru went on to coach in South African professional football. The veteran coach had a career during which he amassed 18 trophies with Chiefs and Sundowns, including two back-to-back league championships with each side.

== Career ==
=== Early coaching career in Romania and Turkey ===
Dumitru started playing football with local side Sportul Studenţesc in the late 1950s, but a serious knee injury forced him to hang up his boots, as a result he began studying to become a coach. After obtaining his coaching license, Dumitru became the youngest manager ever in Divizia A at age 25, when he joined Ştiinţa Craiova, currently known as Universitatea Craiova, in the middle of the 1965–66 season with whom he finished the season on the eighth position. Dumitru also coached the Romania U23 Olympic team between 1967 and 1968.

In 1969, he went to Turkey where he managed Altay Izmir, Beşiktaş and then Mersin. In his first season in charge at Altay he guided the club to a top-three position in the Turkish Süper League.

=== Move to the United States and final destination Africa ===
In 1971, Dumitru moved to the United States and became head coach of the Texas Longhorns men's soccer team at the University of Texas, before joining Rochester Lancers in the North American Soccer League in 1974. He coached that side through the 1975 season and went on to coach the New York Apollo in the old American Soccer League.

In 1980, Dumitru moved to Africa and was appointed coach of the Zambia national team. He helped Chipolopolo qualify for the 1982 Africa Cup of Nations, but was unable to coach them during the tournament itself due to his US passport. The Afcon tournament was hosted by Libya, a country where Americans were not welcome at the time. During his stint Zambia's President Kenneth Kaunda once said of him: "He is more than a coach; he is a son of Africa. He is a humanist who puts sports well-being ahead of his profession."

He left Zambia and signed a contract with the African Football Confederation, in which he was sent to Swaziland, then in Namibia, to help develop football in those countries.

In 1985, Dumitru joined South African side Kaizer Chiefs and won eight trophies with them during his three-year tenure. After leaving the club he worked in developing young players and local coaches across the country.

In 1992, he established the Chibuku Youth Centre in Soweto, which was the first development program in the country. He was later responsible for the Esselen Park School of Excellence that has produced players such as Steven Pienaar and Daine Klate.

In July 1997, he took over as coach at Mamelodi Sundowns and led The Brazilians to two consecutive PSL titles in 1998 and 1999, as well as both the Nedbank Cup and Rothmans Cup. Dumitru managed among others, Orlando Pirates and Manning Rangers with mixed success. He was appointed manager of the Namibia national team in November 2000 replacing Lucky Richter, but resigned a few months later after an argument with former Chiefs midfielder, Robert Nauseb.

He rejoined Mamelodi Sundowns and helped his side reach their first and only African Champions League Final in 2001, which they lost to record holders Al Ahly.

In June 2003, he returned to Kaiser Chiefs and won back-to-back league titles in 2004 and 2005, after which he retired from club coaching. In South Africa, Dumitru was nicknamed "Master Ted", "Mr Magic" or "The Professor", because of his studious approach to the game.

In November 2005, he was hired as South Africa's manager ahead of the 2006 edition of the Africa Cup of Nations, but he was shown the exit door soon after his team's dismissal performance at the tournament where they failed to score a goal.

In 2009, Dumitru got involved with the Mamelodi Sundowns Youth Academy. Dubbed "The Puk Tawana Project", it produced 26 players who went on to play professional football who were on an accelerated development programme for 18 months. Breaking records for the number of graduates from academy to professional level. Among them included Keagan Dolly, Buhle Mkhwanazi, Samuel Julies and Jabulani Shongwe. After leaving Mamelodi Sundowns in 2011, he joined the North West University Sports Institute from 2012 to 2013 briefly. In 2013 he played an instrumental role in the revival of the South African Football Coaches Association (SAFCA). He played a key role in setting up the structures, giving the organisation direction and leadership as well as rolling out workshops around the country. He was involved up until his day of passing.

Over 150 players were developed at the Sport School of Excellence under his guidance and through his coaching solutions. Over 180 local coaches were developed through his programmes at the SA Soccer Academy.

== Death ==
Dumitru died on 26 May 2016, at the age of 76, after suffering a heart attack in a Johannesburg mall. A memorial service for the late coach was held on 2 June at Ellis Park Arena in Johannesburg.

== Honours ==
=== Manager ===
New York Apollo

- American Soccer League: 1978; runner-up: 1976

Kaizer Chiefs

- PSL Champion: 2003–04, 2004–05
- Vodacom Challenge: 2003
- BP Top Eight Cup: 1985, 1987
- Coca-Cola Cup: 1986, 1988, 2003, 2004
- Mainstay Cup: 1987
- Charity Spectacular Cup: 1986, 1987, 1988, 2003
- NSL runner-up: 1987

Mamelodi Sundowns

- PSL Champion: 1997–98, 1998–99
- Nedbank Cup: 1998
- Rothmans Cup: 1999
- CAF Champions League runner-up: 2001

Orlando Pirates

- African Cup Winners' Cup semi-final: 1999
