= Moroka Swallows F.C. =

South African association football club

Moroka Swallows FC
- Full name: Moroka Swallows Football Club
- Nicknames: The Dube Birds, Amaswaiswai, The Beautiful Birds
- Founded: 1947; 79 years ago
- Ground: Volkswagen Dobsonville Stadium, Soweto, Johannesburg
- Capacity: 24,000
- Chairman: David Mogashoa
- Manager: Vacant
- League: Motsepe Foundation Championship
- 2023–24: Premiership, 14th
- Website: morokaswallowsfc.com
Home colours	Away colours

Moroka Swallows Football Club (often referred to as Swallows or The Birds) was a South African professional football club based in Soweto, Johannesburg, in the Gauteng province.

Founded in 1947, Swallows were one of the original two Soweto clubs, together with Orlando Pirates, thus contesting what is known as the Original Soweto Derby.

Until relegation in the 2014–15 season, the club had played every season of the Premiership.

Swallows won the 2019–20 National First Division and competed in the 2020–21 South African Premiership, finishing 6th in what was the club's first season back in top-flight football league system and qualified for 2021 MTN 8 competition. Swallows played its home matches at the Dobsonville Stadium.

== History ==
The club was founded in the 1940s by a trio of football lovers, Ishmael Lesolang, Strike Makgatha, and Johnny Kubheka.

They originally named the side Congregated Rovers after the firm in which most of the players and officials worked, later changing it to Moroka Rovers.

But then, on 10 October 1947, the trio decided to change the name again to Moroka Swallows, basing themselves in the township formally known as Masakeng.

The name has lasted for the best part of 55 years, a period which has seen consistent success both on the field and off it.

The name 'moroka' means 'rain maker' in Setswana and the township was probably named after Chief Moroka of Barolong boo-Seleka who became the president of the African National Congress in 1940s. It is hardly surprising therefore that the club was renamed the 'rain bird'.

The 1950s and 1960s were a successful time for the club, culminating in their greatest ever achievement, winning the South African League title in 1965.

Off the field, the club was becoming a business and in 1971 they became the first ever football team to register as a public company.

That same year they were also the first to receive an official sponsorship when Teljoy began their association with the club. The decade between 1982 and 1992 was a successful one for the team, culminating in four pieces of silverware.

In 2007, the club celebrated its 60th anniversary. Two years later Swallows won the Nedbank Cup, the club's first piece of silverware for five years.

The club narrowly avoided relegation in the 2013–14 season, finishing thirteenth. The 2014–15 season saw them relegated for the first time in their history, finishing 15th, and failing to retain their position after being defeated in the promotion-relegation playoffs.

Following their first relegation from the top level, the club finished bottom of the log in the National First Division, and were relegated again to the SAFA Second Division, subsequently being liquidated.

Prior to the start of the 2018–19 season, Swallows purchased the franchise of National First Division team Maccabi for R8 million, and competed in the 2019–20 National First Division under the name Swallows F.C.

At the end 2019–20 National First Division season, the club gained promotion to the Premiership following a 3–0 win against third-placed Tshakhuma Tsha Madzivhandila F.C., then competed in the 2020–21 South African Premiership.

After being officially named Swallows F.C. in the aftermath of their bankruptcy and a FIFA ban, they renamed themselves to Moroka Swallows F.C. prior to the start of the 2023–24 season.

The club experienced financial difficulties during the 2023–24 season, with the club failing to honour their final two fixtures of 2023. This was blamed in part due to the Premier Soccer League blocking Swallow's sponsorship by Telkom, claiming that it was in competition with MTN, sponsors of their MTN 8 competition.

Swallows sold its Premiership franchise to Marumo Gallants prior to the start of the 2024-25 season.

== Honours ==
- South African Soccer League
  - Winners: 1965
- Nedbank Cup (Mainstay Cup, Bob Save Super Bowl, ABSA Cup)
  - Winners: 1983, 1989, 1991, 2004, 2008–09
- MTN 8 (BP Top Eight)
  - Winners: 1975, 1979, 2012
- Sales House Cup
  - Winners: 1978
- National First Division
  - Winners: 2019–20

== Club records ==
- Most starts: (South Africa) Andries Mpondo 395
- Most goals: (South Africa) Thomas Hlongwane 73
- Most capped player: (South Africa) Lerato Chabangu 13
- Most starts in a season: (South Africa) Andries Mpondo 49 (1986)
- Most goals in a season: (South Africa) Thomas Hlongwane 27 (1985)
- Record Victory: 8–0 vs African Wanderers (29 September 1991, NSL)
- Record Defeat: 2–6 vs Hellenic (7/3/85, Sales House Cup); Rangers (3/7/87, NSL)

=== League positions ===
==== Premiership ====
- 1996–97 – 11th
- 1997–98 – 11th
- 1998–99 – 15th
- 1999–00 – 12th
- 2000–01 – 15th
- 2001–02 – 6th
- 2002–03 – 4th
- 2003–04 – 7th
- 2004–05 – 5th
- 2005–06 – 4th
- 2006–07 – 3rd
- 2007–08 – 7th
- 2008–09 – 11th
- 2009–10 – 8th
- 2010–11 – 13th
- 2011–12 – 2nd
- 2012–13 – 9th
- 2013–14 – 13th
- 2014–15 – 15th (relegated)

==== National First Division ====
- 2015–16 – 16th (relegated)

==== SAFA Second Division (Gauteng) ====
- 2016–17 – 16th
- 2017–18 – 6th
- 2018–19 – 7th (purchased the 1st Division franchise of Maccabi F.C.)

==== National First Division ====
- 2019–20 – 1st (promoted)

==== Premiership ====
- 2020–21 – 6th
- 2021–22 – 15th (retained their place via the playoffs)
- 2022–23 – 8th
- 2023–24 – 14th (franchise sold)

== Notable players ==
- (South Africa) Brad Norman (2019): He converted into the first South African to play in Paraguay following his stint with Moroka Swallows.

== Notable former coaches ==
- (Austria) Walter Rautmann
- (England) Eddie Lewis (1989–91)
- (South Africa) Sandile Bali (1991–92)
- (South Africa) Milo Bjelica (1992)
- (England) Mich d'Avray (1992–93)
- (Brazil) Walter da Silva (1999)
- (Russia) Viktor Bondarenko (2000–02)
- (South Africa) Gavin Hunt (1 July 2002 – 30 June 2007)
- (Zimbabwe) Ian Gorowa (1 July 2007 – 30 June 2008)
- (Brazil) Júlio César Leal (1 July 2008 – 30 June 2009)
- (Germany) Rainer Zobel (17 July 2009 – 28 Nov 2010)
- (South Africa) Gordon Igesund (29 Nov 2010 – 30 June 2012)
- (Portugal) Zeca Marques (1 July 2012 – 2014)
- (South Africa) Craig Rosslee (March 2015 – June 2015)
- (South Africa) Steve Komphela (July 2023 – Jan 2024)
