= Gordon Igesund =

South African soccer player and manager

Personal information
- Full name: Gordon George Igesund
- Date of birth: 22 July 1956 (age 70)
- Place of birth: Durban, South Africa
- Position: Striker

Senior career*
Years	Team	Apps	(Gls)
–	Durban City		
- Durban United
–	Highlands Park		
1980–1981	GAK	5	(1)
1981–1984	Admira Wacker	76	(25)
1984–1985	Durban Leeds United		
1986–1987	Witbank Aces		
1988–1990	Durban Bush Bucks		
1991	Amazulu		
1992–1993	D'Alberton Callies		

Managerial career
- 1995: African Wanderers
- 1996–2000: Manning Rangers
- 2000–2001: Orlando Pirates
- 2001–2002: Santos Cape Town
- 2002–2006: Ajax Cape Town
- 2006–2008: Mamelodi Sundowns
- 2008–2009: Maritzburg United
- 2009–2010: Free State Stars
- 2010–2012: Moroka Swallows
- 2012–2014: South Africa
- 2014–2016: SuperSport United
- 2016–2017: Highlands Park
- * Club domestic league appearances and goals

Gordon Igesund (born 22 July 1956) is a South African former soccer player and coach who was most recently the manager of Highlands Park in the Premier Soccer League.

== Early life ==
Igesund was born in Durban to George Norman Igesund (born 1932). His family lived in Port Shepstone where former Arsenal player Danny Le Roux lived.

== Coaching career ==
Igesund is a record-breaking coach in South Africa, having become the only man to coach four different top-flight teams to the Premier Soccer League championship. He first made his name when he led unfashionable coastal team Manning Rangers to the inaugural PSL title in the 1996/97 season. He followed this up in the 2000/01 season with another title, this time at the helm of Soweto giants Orlando Pirates. He proved his critics wrong the very next season, taking another unfashionable team, Cape Town’s Santos, to a surprise PSL title in 2001/02. But the nomadic Igesund was soon changing his allegiance again, this time moving to Ajax Cape Town, the satellite club of Dutch giants AFC Ajax. Igesund’s time with Ajax proved rather unsuccessful and he left the team at the end of the 2005/06 season. He then replaced Sundowns' co-coaches Miguel Gamondi and Neil Tovey. Igesund added to his record number of PSL titles leading Sundowns to a comfortable PSL win in 2007.

Igesund took over hearetained as the president d coach of Moroka Swallows in November 2010. He took Swallows to second place in the 2011/12 season and received the PSL Coach of the Season award for the second time.

On 30 June 2012, Igesund was appointed as the South Africa national team coach on a two-year deal.

Under Gordon Igesund leadership South Africa national team were knocked out in a dramatic penalty shootout defeat against Mali on 2 February 2013 after the match ended in a draw during the 2013 quarter finals. On 3 June 2014, SAFA announced that they will not be renewing his contract with the South African national football team.

Igesund was appointed head coach of SuperSport United in September 2014 and in November 2014 he led the team to the Telkom Knockout title. However, following a series of poor results he was fired in January 2016.

Igesund was primed to take over as coach of Zambia's national team and turned down many opportunities in the interim only to find out that the federation had tended in another direction with retained president, Edgar Lungu, deciding to have a local coach.

Igesund returned to Highlands Park to become there manager in October 2016, where he used to play his football. However, on 1 April 2017, Highlands Park's club director Sinky Mnisi confirmed that Igesund had been fired with only four matches remaining in the 2016/17 season. Igesund was shocked upon hearing the news and he responded that the club "were on track with our plan and only one point off the tally we had marked out at this stage."

== Coaching honours ==
- 1992 NSL Second Division champion (D'Alberton Callies)
- 1996/97 PSL champion (Manning Rangers)
- 2000/01 PSL champion (Orlando Pirates)
- 2001/02 PSL champion (Santos)
- 2000 BP Top Eight Cup winner (Orlando Pirates)
- 2006/07 PSL champion (Sundowns)
- 2007 SAA Supa 8 winner (Sundowns)
- 2014 Telkom Knockout (SuperSport United)

== Personal ==
Igesund's ancestry can be traced as far back as 1752 to Stokkset Møre og Romsdal, Norway. His great-grandfather Isak Mathinus Isaksen Igesund (12 October 1851 in Igesund, Herøy - 1928 in Port Shepstone) and great-grandmother Dorthe Petrine Sorendsdtr Brekke (3 February 1853 in Brekke, Ørsta, Møre og Romsdal - 1897 in Port Shepstone) arrived as part of the 229 Marburg Norwegian settlers who sailed on the ship Lapland from Ålesund on 14 July 1882, arriving on 29 August 1882 at the Umzimkulu River, Port Shepstone to settle in Marburg and build the Norwegian Settlers Church which still exists today. Norwegian origin surnames were given based on the area they were born in. Igesund's ancestors are from Igesund, Møre og Romsdal, a small farming community island near Ålesund. His Austria-born son Grant Igesund (born in 1982) is also a retired professional footballer who played as a striker for Ajax Cape Town, Manning Rangers, and Maritzburg United among others.

== See also ==
- Santos v Igesund
