= Nedbank Cup =

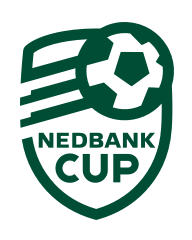
- Founded: 1971; 55 years ago
- Region: South Africa
- Teams: 32
- Qualifier for: CAF Confederation Cup
- Current champions: Durban City (1st title)
- Most championships: Kaizer Chiefs (14 titles)
- Broadcasters: SuperSport; SABC
- Motto: ke yona (the one)
- Website: nedbankcup.co.za
- 2025–26 Nedbank Cup

The Nedbank Cup is the current name of South Africa's premier club soccer knockout tournament. While many formats have been used over the years, the tournament has always been based on the idea of giving lower league and amateur teams a chance to compete with clubs from the top league for the cup. The tournament is based on the English FA Cup, which has become known for "giant killings" (lower league clubs defeating a top-flight club).

== History ==
The tournament was started in 1971 as the Life Challenge Cup, this name stayed in place until 1975. In 1976 and 1977, the tournament was known as the Benson and Hedges Trophy. From 1978 until 1987 the tournament was known as the Mainstay Cup. In 1988 the sponsorship was taken over by First National Bank, and was renamed the Bob Save Super Bowl. This name remained until 2001, however the tournament was not played in 1997. The tournament was again not played in 2002. The competition was then sponsored by ABSA between 2003 and 2007, and known as the ABSA Cup. Nedbank took over the sponsorship in 2008, and renamed the tournament the Nedbank Cup.

== Format ==
The current format sees the 16 Premiership clubs, eight National First Division (NFD) teams, as well as eight teams from the amateur ranks enter the main draw of 32 teams. The Premiership teams enter the main draw automatically, while the NFD clubs need to play a single qualifier against other NFD clubs. The amateur teams go through a series of qualifiers to enter the main draw.

From the round of 32 onwards, teams are not seeded, and the first sides drawn receive home-ground advantage. There are no longer any replays in the tournament, and any games which end in a draw after 90 minutes are subject to 30 minutes extra time followed by penalties if necessary.

The winners receive prize money of R7 million. The winner also qualifies for the next season's CAF Confederation Cup.

== Prize money ==
Position	Prize money (R) (as of 2020)
Champions	7,000,000
Runners-Up	2,500,000
Semi-finals	1,000,000
Quarter finals	400,000
Last 16	200,000
Last 32	100,000

== Past finals ==
Year	Winner	Score	Runner-up	Venue	Winning coach
Life Challenge Cup
1971	Kaizer Chiefs (1)	2–2	Orlando Pirates		
1972	Kaizer Chiefs (2)	4–1	Zulu Royals		
1973	Orlando Pirates (1)	5–2	Zulu Royals		
1974	Orlando Pirates (2)	1–0	AmaZulu		
1975	Orlando Pirates (3)	2–1	Kaizer Chiefs		
Benson and Hedges Trophy
1976	Kaizer Chiefs (3)	1–0	Orlando Pirates		
1977	Kaizer Chiefs (4)	1–0	Orlando Pirates		
Mainstay Cup
1978	Wits University (1)	3–2	Kaizer Chiefs		(England) Eddie Lewis
1979	Kaizer Chiefs (5)	3–3	Highlands Park FC		(Chile) Mario Tuani
1980	Orlando Pirates (4)	3–2	Moroka Swallows		
1981	Kaizer Chiefs (6)	1–1	Orlando Pirates		(South Africa) Eliakim Khumalo
1982	Kaizer Chiefs (7)	2–1	African Wanderers		
1983	Moroka Swallows (1)	1–0	Witbank Black Aces		(Chile) Mario Tuani
1984	Kaizer Chiefs (8)	1–0	Orlando Pirates		(Scotland) Joe Frickleton
1985	Bloemfontein Celtic (1)	2–1	African Wanderers		(England) Dave Roberts
1986	Mamelodi Sundowns (1)	1–0	Jomo Cosmos		(South Africa) Stanley Tshabalala
1987	Kaizer Chiefs (9)	1–0	AmaZulu		(Romania) Ted Dumitru
Bob Save Super Bowl
1988	Orlando Pirates (5)	2–1	Kaizer Chiefs		(Brazil) Walter da Silva
1989	Moroka Swallows (2)	1–1 (5–1 replay)	Mamelodi Sundowns		(England) Eddie Lewis
1990	Jomo Cosmos (1)	1–0	AmaZulu		(England) Roy Matthews
1991	Moroka Swallows (3)	2–1	Jomo Cosmos		
1992	Kaizer Chiefs (10)	2–1	Jomo Cosmos		(England) Jeff Butler
1993	Witbank Black Aces (1)	1–0	Kaizer Chiefs		(South Africa) Johnny Ferreira
1994	Vaal Professionals (1)	1–0	Qwa Qwa Stars		(South Africa) Simon Lehoko
1995	Cape Town Spurs (1)	3–2	Pretoria City		(South Africa) Mich d'Avray
1996	Orlando Pirates (6)	1–0	Jomo Cosmos		(Russia) Viktor Bondarenko
1997	Not played				
1998	Mamelodi Sundowns (2)	1–1	Orlando Pirates		(Romania) Ted Dumitru
1999	Supersport United (1)	2–1	Kaizer Chiefs		(England) Roy Matthews
2000	Kaizer Chiefs (11)	1–0	Mamelodi Sundowns		(Turkey) Muhsin Ertugral
2001	Santos (1)	1–0	Mamelodi Sundowns		(South Africa) Clive Barker
2002	Not played				
ABSA Cup
2003	Santos (2)	2–0	Ajax Cape Town		(South Africa) Boebie Solomons
2004	Moroka Swallows (4)	3–1	Manning Rangers		(South Africa) Gavin Hunt
2005	Supersport United (2)	1–0	Wits University		(South Africa) Pitso Mosimane
2006	Kaizer Chiefs (12)	0–0 (aet; 5–3 pen.)	Orlando Pirates	Kings Park Stadium	(Germany) Ernst Middendorp
2007	Ajax Cape Town (2)	2–0	Mamelodi Sundowns	Kings Park Stadium	(Turkey) Muhsin Ertugral
Nedbank Cup
2008	Mamelodi Sundowns (3)	1–0	Mpumalanga Black Aces	Johannesburg Stadium	(South Africa) Trott Moloto
2008–09	Moroka Swallows (5)	1–0	Pretoria University	Rand Stadium	(Brazil) Júlio César Leal
2009–10	Bidvest Wits (2)	3–0	AmaZulu	Soccer City	(South Africa) Roger De Sá
2010–11	Orlando Pirates (7)	3–1	Black Leopards	Mbombela Stadium	(Netherlands) Ruud Krol
2011–12	Supersport United (3)	2–0	Mamelodi Sundowns	Orlando Stadium	(South Africa) Gavin Hunt
2012–13	Kaizer Chiefs (13)	1–0	Supersport United	Moses Mabhida Stadium	(Scotland) Stuart Baxter
2013–14	Orlando Pirates (8)	3–1	Bidvest Wits	Moses Mabhida Stadium	(Serbia) Vladimir Vermezović
2014–15	Mamelodi Sundowns (4)	0–0 (aet; 4–3 pen.)	Ajax Cape Town	Nelson Mandela Bay Stadium	(South Africa) Pitso Mosimane
2015–16	Supersport United (4)	3–2	Orlando Pirates	Peter Mokaba Stadium	(Scotland) Stuart Baxter
2016–17	Supersport United (5)	4–1	Orlando Pirates	Moses Mabhida Stadium	(Scotland) Stuart Baxter
2017–18	Free State Stars (1)	1–0	Maritzburg United	Cape Town Stadium	(Belgium) Luc Eymael
2018–19	TS Galaxy (1)	1–0	Kaizer Chiefs	Moses Mabhida Stadium	(South Africa) Dan Malesela
2019–20	Mamelodi Sundowns (5)	1–0	Bloemfontein Celtic	Orlando Stadium	(South Africa) Pitso Mosimane
2020–21	Tshakhuma (1)	1–0	Chippa United	Free State Stadium	(England) Dylan Kerr
2021–22	Mamelodi Sundowns (6)	2–1 (aet)	Marumo Gallants	Royal Bafokeng Stadium	(South Africa) Manqoba Mngqithi & (South Africa) Rulani Mokwena
2022–23	Orlando Pirates (9)	2–1	Sekhukhune United	Loftus Versfeld Stadium	(Spain) José Riveiro
2023–24	Orlando Pirates (10)	2–1	Mamelodi Sundowns	Mbombela Stadium	(Spain) José Riveiro
2024–25	Kaizer Chiefs (14)	2–1	Orlando Pirates	Moses Mabhida Stadium	(Tunisia) Nasreddine Nabi
2025–26	Durban City (1)	2–1	TS Galaxy	Peter Mokaba Stadium	(South Africa) Pitso Dladla

== Results by team ==
Results by team
Club	Wins	First final won	Last final won	Runners-up	Last final lost	Total final appearances
Kaizer Chiefs	14	1971	2025	5	2019	19
Orlando Pirates	10	1973	2024	10	2025	20
Mamelodi Sundowns	6	1986	2022	6	2024	12
Moroka Swallows	5	1983	2009	1	1980	6
SuperSport United	5	1999	2017	1	2013	6
Wits University	2	1978	2010	2	2014	4
Cape Town Spurs / Ajax Cape Town	2	1995	2007	2	2015	4
Santos	2	2001	2003	0	-	2
Jomo Cosmos	1	1990	1990	4	1996	5
Witbank Black Aces	1	1993	1993	1	1983	2
Free State Stars / Qwa Qwa Stars	1	2018	2018	1	1994	2
Bloemfontein Celtic	1	1985	1985	1	2020	2
Durban City / Maritzburg United	1	2026	2026	1	2018	2
TS Galaxy	1	2019	2019	1	2026	2
Tshakhuma	1	2021	2021	0	—	1
Vaal Professionals	1	1994	1994	0	—	1
Amazulu	0	—	—	6	2010	6
African Wanderers	0	—	—	2	1985	2
Black Leopards	0	—	—	1	2011	1
Chippa United	0	—	—	1	2021	1
Highlands Park FC	0	—	—	1	1979	1
Manning Rangers	0	—	—	1	2004	1
Marumo Gallants	0	—	—	1	2022	1
Mpumalanga Black Aces	0	—	—	1	2008	1
Pretoria City	0	—	—	1	1995	1
Pretoria University	0	—	—	1	2009	1
