= 2016–17 Cape Town City F.C. season =

Cape Town City
2016–17 season
- Manager: Eric Tinkler
- Stadium: Cape Town Stadium
- Premier Division: 3rd
- Nedbank Cup: Round of 32 Acornbush United
- MTN 8: Semifinal vs Bidvest Wits
- Telkom Knockout: Champions
- Top goalscorer: League: Lebogang Manyama (13); All: Lebogang Manyama (14)
- Average home league attendance: 3,480

The 2016–17 Cape Town City season was the club's first season after their re-formation. They participated in the ABSA Premiership, finishing third, reached the semifinals of the MTN 8 and became champions of the Telkom Knockout.

== Squad ==
As of match played 27 May 2017

No.	Name	Nationality	Position	Date of birth (age)	Signed from	Signed in	Contract ends	Apps.	Goals
Goalkeepers
15	Gershin Kock	(South Africa)	GK	5 January 1993 (aged 24)		2016		0	0
31	Shu-Aib Walters	(South Africa)	GK	26 December 1981 (aged 35)	Mpumalanga Black Aces	2016		34	0
32	Tatenda Mkuruva	(Zimbabwe)	GK	4 January 1996 (aged 21)	Dynamos	2016		1	0
41	Samora Motloung	(South Africa)	GK	19 August 1994 (aged 22)	Cape Town All Stars	2016		3	0
Defenders
2	Thamsanqa Mkhize	(South Africa)	DF	18 August 1988 (aged 28)	Maritzburg United	2016		24	1
4	Vincent Kobola	(South Africa)	DF	8 January 1985 (aged 32)	Mpumalanga Black Aces	2016		17	0
5	Joseph Adjei	(Ghana)	DF	20 August 1995 (aged 21)	loan from Wa All Stars	2016		8	0
6	Ebrahim Seedat	(South Africa)	DF	18 June 1993 (aged 23)	Milano United	2016		20	0
16	Robyn Johannes	(South Africa)	DF	23 August 1986 (aged 30)	AmaZulu	2016		21	0
21	Thato Mokeke	(South Africa)	DF	1 April 1989 (aged 28)	loan from SuperSport United	2016		32	0
23	Mpho Matsi	(South Africa)	DF	7 February 1990 (aged 27)	Mpumalanga Black Aces	2016		27	1
27	Tshepo Gumede	(South Africa)	DF	21 April 1991 (aged 26)	Orlando Pirates	2016		35	1
30	Ricardo Ndiki	(South Africa)	DF					0	0
39	Edmilson	(Mozambique)	DF	18 July 1994 (aged 22)	Ferroviário de Maputo	2017		10	0
	Never Ngcuka	(South Africa)	DF					0	0
Midfielders
8	Lebogang Manyama	(South Africa)	MF	13 September 1990 (aged 26)	SuperSport United	2016		37	14
9	Letsie Koapeng	(South Africa)	MF	12 January 1992 (aged 25)	Stellenbosch	2017		10	1
11	Aubrey Ngoma	(South Africa)	MF	16 September 1989 (aged 27)	Mpumalanga Black Aces	2016		35	7
12	Aubrey Modiba	(South Africa)	MF	22 July 1995 (aged 21)	SuperSport United	2016		2	0
13	Siyabonga Dubula	(South Africa)	MF	19 October 1994 (aged 22)	Ubuntu Cape Town	2017		1	0
17	Given Mashikinya	(South Africa)	MF	13 April 1991 (aged 26)				18	2
19	Roland Putsche	(Austria)	MF	21 March 1991 (aged 26)	Wolfsberger AC	2016		29	3
25	Duncan Adonis	(South Africa)	MF	1 January 1999 (aged 18)				3	0
26	Thabo Nodada	(South Africa)	MF	2 May 1995 (aged 22)	Mpumalanga Black Aces	2016		13	1
28	Shaquille Abrahams	(South Africa)	MF	11 April 1997 (aged 20)				0	0
Forwards
10	Bhongolwethu Jayiya	(South Africa)	FW	21 March 1990 (aged 27)	Mpumalanga Black Aces	2016		29	6
20	Judas Moseamedi	(South Africa)	FW	22 January 1994 (aged 23)				33	6
24	Sibusiso Masina	(South Africa)	FW	27 December 1989 (aged 27)				30	4
40	Luyolo Nomandela	(South Africa)	FW	3 November 1989 (aged 27)	Mamelodi Sundowns	2016		2	0
45	Lehlohonolo Majoro	(South Africa)	FW	19 August 1986 (aged 30)	Orlando Pirates	2016		29	8
Away on loan
14	Nana Akosah-Bempah	(Ghana)	FW	29 August 1997 (aged 19)				2	0
Players that left Cape Town City during the season
3	Renārs Rode	(Latvia)	DF	6 April 1989 (aged 28)	Sigma Olomouc	2016		7	0
7	Matt Sim	(Australia)	MF	18 April 1988 (aged 29)	Western Sydney Wanderers	2016		14	2
18	James Brown	(Australia)	FW	19 February 1990 (aged 27)	Avondale	2016		3	0

== Transfers ==
=== In ===
Date	Position	Nationality	Name	From	Fee	Ref.
4 August 2016	GK	(South Africa)	Samora Motloung	Cape Town All Stars	Undisclosed	
4 August 2016	DF	(Latvia)	Renārs Rode	Sigma Olomouc	Undisclosed	
4 August 2016	DF	(South Africa)	Tshepo Gumede	Orlando Pirates	Undisclosed	
4 August 2016	DF	(South Africa)	Robyn Johannes	AmaZulu	Undisclosed	
4 August 2016	DF	(South Africa)	Never Ngcuka			
4 August 2016	DF	(South Africa)	Ebrahim Seedat	Milano United	Undisclosed	
4 August 2016	MF	(Austria)	Roland Putsche	Wolfsberger AC	Undisclosed	
4 August 2016	MF	(Australia)	Matt Sim	Western Sydney Wanderers	Undisclosed	
4 August 2016	MF	(South Africa)	Shaquille Abrahams			
4 August 2016	FW	(Australia)	James Brown	Avondale	Undisclosed	
4 August 2016	FW	(South Africa)	Duncan Adonis			
27 January 2017	DF	(Mozambique)	Edmilson	Ferroviário de Maputo	Undisclosed	

=== Out ===
Date	Position	Nationality	Name	To	Fee	Ref.

=== Loans in ===
Date from	Position	Nationality	Name	From	Date to	Ref.

=== Loans out ===
Date from	Position	Nationality	Name	To	Date to	Ref.
1 February 2017	FW	(Ghana)	Nana Akosah-Bempah	Stellenbosch	End of Season	

=== Released ===
Date	Position	Nationality	Name	Joined	Date
11 October 2016	FW	(Australia)	James Brown	Nunawading City	
30 December 2016	DF	(Latvia)	Renārs Rode	RFS	
30 December 2016	MF	(Australia)	Matt Sim	Sydney United	

=== Trial ===
Date From	Date To	Position	Nationality	Name	Last club	Ref.
		DF				

== Competitions ==
=== Premier Division ===
==== Results by round ====
Round	1	2	3	4	5	6	7	8	9	10	11	12	13	14	15	16	17	18	19	20	21	22	23	24	25	26	27	28	29	30
Ground	H	A	A	H	A	H	A	H	A	H	A	A	H	H	A	H	A	H	A	H	A	H	A	H	H	A	H	A	H	A
Result	W	L	D	W	D	L	W	W	W	W	D	W	L	D	L	W	W	D	W	W	D	W	W	D	W	L	W	L	W	L
Position	2	8	7	5	4	6	5	5	3	2	1	1	1	1	3	3	2	4	2	1	1	1	1	1	3	3	3	3	3	3

Updated to match(es) played on 27 May 2017. Source: See Results
A = Away; H = Home; W = Win; D = Draw; L = Loss

==== Results ====
23 August 2016 1	Cape Town City	2–0	Polokwane City	Cape Town
19:30 SAST (UTC+2)	Kobola (yellow card) 41'; Jayiya 45+2'; Brown (yellow card) 54'; Ngoma 68'	Report	Seabi (yellow card) 83'	Stadium: Cape Town Stadium; Attendance: 3,000

14 September 2016 2	Golden Arrows	2–0	Cape Town City	Durban
19:30 SAST (UTC+2)	Lamola 40'; Dube (yellow card) 63'; Mbaeva (yellow card) 77'; Jooste 90+3'	Report		Stadium: Sugar Ray Xulu Stadium; Attendance: 1,000; Referee: Thando Ndzandzeka

20 September 2016 3	Orlando Pirates	0–0	Cape Town City	Johannesburg
19:30 SAST (UTC+2)	Mobara (yellow card) 10'	Report	Matsi (yellow card) 31'; Manyama (yellow card) 35'; Ngoma (yellow card) 66'; Jayiya (yellow card) 74'	Stadium: Orlando Stadium; Attendance: 5,000; Referee: Daniel Bennett

23 September 2016 4	Cape Town City	1–0	Ajax Cape Town	Cape Town
20:00 SAST (UTC+2)	Jayiya 22'	Report	Graham (yellow card) 68'	Stadium: Cape Town Stadium; Attendance: 7,500; Referee: Lwandile Mfiki

27 September 2016 5	Highlands Park	1–1	Cape Town City	Johannesburg
19:30 SAST (UTC+2)	Mbesuma 71'	Report	Manyama 68'; Gumede (yellow card) 88'	Stadium: Makhulong Stadium; Attendance: 1,500; Referee: Khulekani Thusi

15 October 2016 6	Cape Town City	1–2	Baroka	Cape Town
20:15 SAST (UTC+2)	Majoro (yellow card) 20'; Jayiya (yellow card) 35'; Mashikinya 53'; Matsi (yellow card) 80'	Report	Shaku (yellow card) 39'; Mahashe 51'; Dube 53'	Stadium: Cape Town Stadium; Attendance: 3,500; Referee: Daniel Bennett

30 October 2016 7	Mamelodi Sundowns	1–2	Cape Town City	Pretoria
15:30 SAST (UTC+2)	Nthethe 57'; Arendse (yellow card) 67'	Report	Manyama 21', 82'; Seedat (yellow card) 90+1'	Stadium: Loftus Versfeld Stadium; Attendance: 8,000; Referee: Lwandile Mfiki

2 November 2016 8	Cape Town City	1–0	Bloemfontein Celtic	Cape Town
19:30 SAST (UTC+2)	Majoro 23'; Nodada (yellow card) 26'; Matsi (yellow card) 40'; Mkhize (yellow card) 79'; Manyama (yellow card) 81'	Report	Jampies (yellow card) 90'	Stadium: Cape Town Stadium; Attendance: 1,500; Referee: Phillip Tinyani

19 November 2016 9	Chippa United	1–2	Cape Town City	Port Elizabeth
15:30 SAST (UTC+2)	Okwuosa (yellow card) 19'; Lorch (yellow card) 82'; Mashego 84' (pen.)	Report	Manyama 19' (pen.); Moseamedi 73'	Stadium: Nelson Mandela Bay Stadium; Attendance: 4,000; Referee: Victor Gomes

22 November 2016 10	Cape Town City	3–2	Maritzburg United	Cape Town
19:30 SAST (UTC+2)	Gumede (yellow card) 15'; Majoro 20'; Masina 46'; Johannes (yellow card) 53' (yellow-red card) 90+1'; Matsi (yellow card) 71'; Manyama (yellow card) 76'; Mkhize (yellow card) 90+3'	Report	Onyango 5'; Mngonyama (yellow card) 16'; Rusike 54'; Saal (yellow card) 57'	Stadium: Athlone Stadium; Attendance: 1,000; Referee: Victor Hlungwani

29 November 2016 11	Kaizer Chiefs	1–1	Cape Town City	Johannesburg
19:30 SAST (UTC+2)	Maluleka 3'; Khumalo (red card) 25'; Parker (yellow card) 76'	Report	Putsche (yellow card) 38'; Sim 50'; Gumede (yellow card) 50'; Adjei (yellow card) 74'	Stadium: FNB Stadium; Attendance: 7,000; Referee: Victor Gomes

2 December 2016 12	Bidvest Wits	2–3	Cape Town City	Johannesburg
20:00 SAST (UTC+2)	Khumalo 31'; Rodgers 59'; Zulu (yellow card) 74'; Klate (yellow card) 81'	Report	Putsche 11'; Mokeke (yellow card) 18'; Manyama 56', 90+4' (yellow card) 86'; Johannes (yellow card) 79'	Stadium: Bidvest Stadium; Attendance: 1,000; Referee: Thando Ndzandzeka

13 December 2016 13	Cape Town City	0–4	Platinum Stars	Cape Town
19:30 SAST (UTC+2)	Adjei (yellow card) 49' (yellow-red card) 90'; Matsi (yellow card) 85'	Report	Nhlapo 4'; Tshabalala 9'; Mabena (yellow card) 62' (goal) 81'; Ntuli (yellow card) 74' (goal) 76'; M.Mabule (yellow card) 84'	Stadium: Athlone Stadium; Attendance: 500; Referee: Phillip Tinyani

16 December 2016 14	Cape Town City	1–1	SuperSport United	Cape Town
18:00 SAST (UTC+2)	Manyama (yellow card) 51' (goal) 90+3'; Putsche (yellow card) 71'	Report	Booysen (yellow card) 33'; Daniels (yellow card) 54'; Nkhatha 82'	Stadium: Cape Town Stadium; Attendance: 2,000; Referee: Daniel Bennett

21 December 2016 15	Free State Stars	1–0	Cape Town City	Bethlehem
19:30 SAST (UTC+2)	Sekotlong (yellow card) 35' (goal) 80' (pen.); Mbhele (yellow card) 48'; Teyise (yellow card) 75'	Report	Matsi (yellow card) 28' (yellow-red card) 82'; Moseamedi (yellow card) 54'; Mkhize (yellow card) 79'; Johannes (yellow card) 90+1'	Stadium: Goble Park; Attendance: 1,000; Referee: Phillip Tinyani

	–
SAST (UTC+2)

	–
SAST (UTC+2)

	–
SAST (UTC+2)

	–
SAST (UTC+2)

	–
SAST (UTC+2)

	–
SAST (UTC+2)

	–
SAST (UTC+2)

	–
SAST (UTC+2)

	–
SAST (UTC+2)

	–
SAST (UTC+2)

	–
SAST (UTC+2)

	–
SAST (UTC+2)

	–
SAST (UTC+2)

	–
SAST (UTC+2)

	–
SAST (UTC+2)

==== League table ====
Pos	Team	Pld	W	D	L	GF	GA	GD	Pts	Qualification or relegation
1	Bidvest Wits (C)	30	18	6	6	47	22	+25	60	Qualification for 2018 CAF Champions League
2	Mamelodi Sundowns	30	16	9	5	52	20	+32	57	Qualification for 2018 CAF Champions League
3	Cape Town City	30	16	7	7	47	35	+12	55	Qualification for 2018 CAF Confederation Cup
4	Kaizer Chiefs	30	13	11	6	39	28	+11	50	
5	SuperSport United	30	12	12	6	42	29	+13	48	

Updated to match(es) played on 13 May 2017. Source: Soccerway
Rules for classification: 1) points; 2) goal difference; 3) goals scored; 4) head-to-head points; 5) head-to-head goal difference; 6) head-to-head goals scored; 7) playoff
(C) Champions

=== MTN 8 ===
26 August 2016 Quarterfinal	Cape Town City	1–0	Kaizer Chiefs	Cape Town
20:00 SAST (UTC+2)	Sim 6'; Putsche (yellow card) 54'; Jayiya (yellow card) 75'; Walters (yellow card) 84'; Modiba (yellow card) 85'	Report		Stadium: Cape Town Stadium; Attendance: 25,000

10 September 2016 Semifinal 1st leg	Bidvest Wits	3–0	Cape Town City	Johannesburg
20:15 SAST (UTC+2)	Rodgers 23'; Domingues 37'; Mhango 44'; Hlanti (yellow card) 59'; Josephs (red card) 70'	Report	Gumede (yellow card) 51'; Moseamedi (yellow card) 77'; Kobola (yellow card) 89'; Putsche (yellow card) 90+2'	Stadium: Bidvest Stadium; Attendance: 3,000; Referee: Kulasander Qongqo

17 September 2016 Semifinal 2nd leg	Cape Town City	0–0 (0–3 agg.)	Bidvest Wits	Cape Town
20:15 SAST (UTC+2)	Kobola (yellow card) 66'	Report	Mkhwanazi (yellow card) 61'	Stadium: Cape Town Stadium; Attendance: 500; Referee: Victor Hlungwani

=== Telkom Knockout ===
19 October 2016 First Round	Cape Town City	2–0 (a.e.t.)	Bloemfontein Celtic	Cape Town
19:30 SAST (UTC+2)	Matsi (yellow card) 37'; Nodada (yellow card) 77'; Seedat (yellow card) 92'; Masina 115'; Mahlasela 117' (o.g.)	Report	Rikhotso (yellow card) 54' (yellow-red card) 112'; Ndengane (yellow card) 58'; Mxoyana (yellow card) 99'; Lakay (yellow card) 104'	Stadium: Cape Town Stadium; Referee: Phelelani Ndaba

5 November 2016 Quarterfinal	Baroka	3–4 (a.e.t.)	Cape Town City	Polokwane
15:00 SAST (UTC+2)	Mothupa 45'; Motshegwa 58'; Munetsi (yellow card) 83'; Mahashe 90+2'	Report	Majoro 8'; Jayiya 19' (yellow card) 50'; Johannes (yellow card) 70'; Mashikinya 90'; Gumede (yellow card) 105'; Masina 115'	Stadium: Pietersburg Stadium; Referee: Lwandile Mfiki

26 November 2016 Semifinal	Cape Town City	4–1	Free State Stars	Cape Town
15:00 SAST (UTC+2)	Manyama 8' (pen.); Putsche 30'; Masina (yellow card) 57'; Matsi 63'; Ngoma 81'	Report	Mashego (yellow card) 9'; Sekotlong 38'; Nkausu (yellow card) 78'; Kerspuy (yellow card) 90+3' (yellow-red card)	Stadium: Cape Town Stadium; Referee: Khulekani Thusi

10 December 2016 Final	SuperSport United	1–2	Cape Town City	Polokwane
18:00 SAST (UTC+2)	Nkhatha 71' (yellow card) 71'	Report	Ngoma 12' (yellow card) 35'; Jayiya (yellow card) 39'; Moseamedi 73'; Walters (yellow card) 87'	Stadium: Pietersburg Stadium; Referee: Khulekani Thusi

=== Nedbank Cup ===
12 March 2017 Round of 32	Acornbush United	1–0	Cape Town City	Kabokweni
15:00 SAST (UTC+2)	Nkosi 42'	Report	Majoro (yellow card) 69'; Putsche (yellow card) 71'; Masina (yellow card) 90+1'	Stadium: Kabokweni Stadium; Attendance: 1,000; Referee: Phelelani Ndaba

== Squad statistics ==
As of match played 27 May 2017

=== Appearances and goals ===
No.	Pos	Nat	Player	Total		Premier Division		MTN 8		Telkom Knockout		Nedbank Cup	
No.	Pos	Nat	Player	Apps	Goals	Apps	Goals	Apps	Goals	Apps	Goals	Apps	Goals
2	DF	(South Africa) RSA	Thamsanqa Mkhize	24	1	19	1	0	0	4	0	1	0
4	DF	(South Africa) RSA	Vincent Kobola	17	0	11+1	0	3	0	1	0	1	0
5	DF	(Ghana) GHA	Joseph Adjei	8	0	3+3	0	0	0	1+1	0	0	0
6	DF	(South Africa) RSA	Ebrahim Seedat	20	0	14+3	0	1	0	2	0	0	0
8	MF	(South Africa) RSA	Lebogang Manyama	37	14	28+1	13	3	0	4	1	1	0
9	MF	(South Africa) RSA	Letsie Koapeng	10	1	3+6	1	0	0	0	0	1	0
10	FW	(South Africa) RSA	Bhongolwethu Jayiya	29	6	15+9	5	2+1	0	0+2	1	0	0
11	MF	(South Africa) RSA	Aubrey Ngoma	35	7	28	5	1+1	0	4	2	0+1	0
12	MF	(South Africa) RSA	Aubrey Modiba	2	0	1	0	1	0	0	0	0	0
13	MF	(South Africa) RSA	Siyabonga Dubula	1	0	0+1	0	0	0	0	0	0	0
16	DF	(South Africa) RSA	Robyn Johannes	21	0	17	0	0+1	0	3	0	0	0
17	MF	(South Africa) RSA	Given Mashikinya	18	2	4+11	1	0	0	0+3	1	0	0
19	MF	(Austria) AUT	Roland Putsche	29	3	21+1	2	1+1	0	4	1	1	0
20	FW	(South Africa) RSA	Judas Moseamedi	33	6	7+18	5	1+2	0	1+3	1	1	0
21	DF	(South Africa) RSA	Thato Mokeke	32	0	27	0	1	0	3	0	0+1	0
23	DF	(South Africa) RSA	Mpho Matsi	27	1	17+3	0	2+1	0	2+1	1	1	0
24	FW	(South Africa) RSA	Sibusiso Masina	30	4	14+10	2	0+1	0	2+2	2	1	0
25	MF	(South Africa) RSA	Duncan Adonis	3	0	0+1	0	1+1	0	0	0	0	0
26	MF	(South Africa) RSA	Thabo Nodada	13	1	7+4	1	0	0	1+1	0	0	0
27	DF	(South Africa) RSA	Tshepo Gumede	35	1	28	1	3	0	3	0	1	0
31	GK	(South Africa) RSA	Shu-Aib Walters	34	0	27	0	3	0	4	0	0	0
32	GK	(Zimbabwe) ZIM	Tatenda Mkuruva	1	0	0	0	0	0	0	0	1	0
39	DF	(Mozambique) MOZ	Edmilson	10	0	7+2	0	0	0	0	0	1	0
40	FW	(South Africa) RSA	Luyolo Nomandela	2	0	0+2	0	0	0	0	0	0	0
41	GK	(South Africa) RSA	Samora Motloung	3	0	3	0	0	0	0	0	0	0
45	FW	(South Africa) RSA	Lehlohonolo Majoro	29	8	20+3	7	3	0	2	1	0+1	0
Players away from the club on loan:
14	FW	(Ghana) GHA	Nana Akosah-Bempah	2	0	0+2	0	0	0	0	0	0	0
Players who appeared for Cape Town City but left during the season:
3	DF	(Latvia) LVA	Renārs Rode	7	0	3+1	0	3	0	0	0	0	0
7	MF	(Australia) AUS	Matt Sim	14	2	5+4	1	3	1	1+1	0	0	0
18	FW	(Australia) AUS	James Brown	3	0	1+1	0	1	0	0	0	0	0

=== Goal scorers ===
Place	Position	Nation	Number	Name	Premier Division	MTN 8	Telkom Knockout	Nedbank Cup	Total
1	MF	(South Africa)	8	Lebogang Manyama	13	0	1	0	14
2	FW	(South Africa)	45	Lehlohonolo Majoro	7	0	1	0	8
3	FW	(South Africa)	11	Aubrey Ngoma	5	0	2	0	7
4	FW	(South Africa)	10	Bhongolwethu Jayiya	5	0	1	0	6
4	FW	(South Africa)	20	Judas Moseamedi	5	0	1	0	6
6	FW	(South Africa)	24	Sibusiso Masina	2	0	2	0	4
7	FW	(Austria)	19	Roland Putsche	2	0	1	0	3
7				Own goal	2	0	1	0	3
9	MF	(Australia)	7	Matt Sim	1	1	0	0	2
9	MF	(South Africa)	17	Given Mashikinya	1	0	1	0	2
11	DF	(South Africa)	2	Thamsanqa Mkhize	1	0	0	0	1
11	MF	(South Africa)	9	Letsie Koapeng	1	0	0	0	1
11	MF	(South Africa)	26	Thabo Nodada	1	0	0	0	1
11	DF	(South Africa)	27	Tshepo Gumede	1	0	0	0	1
11	DF	(South Africa)	23	Mpho Matsi	0	0	1	0	1
Total					47	1	12	0	60

=== Disciplinary record ===
Number	Nation	Position	Name	Premier Division		MTN 8		Telkom Knockout		Nedbank Cup		Total	
Number	Nation	Position	Name	Booked	Sent off (straight red)	Booked	Sent off (straight red)	Booked	Sent off (straight red)	Booked	Sent off (straight red)	Booked	Sent off (straight red)
2	(South Africa)	DF	Thamsanqa Mkhize	3	0	0	0	0	0	0	0	3	0
4	(South Africa)	DF	Vincent Kobola	1	0	2	0	0	0	0	0	3	0
5	(Ghana)	DF	Joseph Adjei	3	1	0	0	0	0	0	0	3	1
6	(South Africa)	DF	Ebrahim Seedat	1	0	0	0	1	0	0	0	2	0
8	(South Africa)	MF	Lebogang Manyama	7	0	0	0	0	0	0	0	7	0
10	(South Africa)	FW	Bhongolwethu Jayiya	2	0	1	0	2	0	0	0	5	0
11	(South Africa)	MF	Aubrey Ngoma	3	0	0	0	1	0	0	0	4	0
12	(South Africa)	MF	Aubrey Modiba	0	0	1	0	0	0	0	0	1	0
16	(South Africa)	DF	Robyn Johannes	6	1	0	0	1	0	0	0	7	1
19	(Austria)	MF	Roland Putsche	6	0	2	0	0	0	1	0	9	0
20	(South Africa)	FW	Judas Moseamedi	2	0	1	0	0	0	0	0	3	0
21	(South Africa)	DF	Thato Mokeke	4	0	0	0	0	0	0	0	4	0
23	(South Africa)	DF	Mpho Matsi	8	1	0	0	1	0	0	0	9	1
24	(South Africa)	FW	Sibusiso Masina	1	0	0	0	1	0	1	0	3	0
26	(South Africa)	MF	Thabo Nodada	2	0	0	0	1	0	0	0	3	0
27	(South Africa)	DF	Tshepo Gumede	6	0	1	0	1	0	0	0	7	0
31	(South Africa)	GK	Shu-Aib Walters	2	0	1	0	1	0	0	0	4	0
39	(Mozambique)	DF	Edmilson	2	0	0	0	0	0	0	0	2	0
45	(South Africa)	FW	Lehlohonolo Majoro	1	0	0	0	0	0	1	0	2	0
Players away on loan:
Players who left Cape Town City during the season:
18	(Australia)	FW	James Brown	1	0	0	0	0	0	0	0	1	0
Total				61	3	9	0	10	0	3	0	83	3
