= 2016 Telkom Knockout =

Tournament details
- Country: South Africa
- Dates: 19 October-10 December
- Teams: 16

Final positions
- Champions: Cape Town City
- Runners-up: Supersport United

Tournament statistics
- Matches played: 15

The 2016 Telkom Knockout was the 35th edition of the Telkom Knockout, a South African cup competition comprising the 16 teams in the Premier Soccer League. It took place between October and December 2016. It was won by Cape Town City - the club's first trophy, six months after the club's creation.

== Results ==
=== First round ===
19 October 2016

Cape Town City	2–0	Bloemfontein Celtic
Sibusiso Masina 115'; Kabelo Mahlasela 117' (o.g.)

21 October 2016

Highlands Park	2–0	Chippa United
Collins Mbesuma 12'; Edwin Sitayitayi 76'

22 October 2016

Free State Stars	3–1	Bidvest Wits
Moeketsi Sekola 93'; Sthembiso Dlamini 94'; Danny Venter 111'		Daine Klate 119'

22 October 2016

Kaizer Chiefs	0–0	Maritzburg United

22 October 2016

SuperSport United	1–0	Ajax Cape Town
Thuso Phala 92'

23 October 2016

Baroka FC	3–1	Platinum Stars
Mzwanele Mahashe 3'; Mzwanele Mahashe 46'; Marshall Munetsi 63'		Sipho Senne 90'

23 October 2016

Orlando Pirates	2–1	Golden Arrows
Mpho Makola 10'; Amigo Memela 72'		Wayde Jooste 63'

27 October 2016

Mamelodi Sundowns	2–0	Polokwane City
Hlompho Kekana 65'; Themba Zwane 70'

=== Quarter-finals ===
5 November 2016

Baroka FC	3–4 (a.e.t.)	Cape Town City
Albert Mothupa 45'; Jacky Motshegwa 59'; Mzwanele Mahashe 90'	Report	Lehlohonolo Majoro 7'; Bhongolwethu Jayiya 20'; Given Mashikinya 90'; Sibusiso Masina 114'

5 November 2016

Mamelodi Sundowns	0–0	SuperSport United
	Report
Penalties
	1–3

5 November 2016

Orlando Pirates	2–1	Highlands Park
Augustine Mbara 39' (o.g.); Tendai Ndoro 60'	Report	Mothobi Mvala 66'

6 November 2016

Kaizer Chiefs	2–2	Free State Stars
Edmore Chirambadare 83'; Eric Mathoho 108'	Report	Bokang Thlone 9'; Thokozani Sekotlong 98'
Penalties
	5–6

=== Semi-finals ===
26 November 2016

SuperSport United	1–0	Orlando Pirates
Thabo Mnyamane 22'	Report

26 November 2016

Cape Town City	4–1	Free State Stars
Lebogang Manyama 9' (pen.); Roland Putsche 30'; Mpho Matsi 62'; Aubrey Ngoma 79'	Report	Thokozani Sekotlong 37'

=== Final ===
10 December 2016

SuperSport United	1–2	Cape Town City
Kingston Nkhatha 71'	Report	Aubrey Ngoma 13'; Judas Moseamedi 73'

== Prize money ==
First round
Participation Fee	R250,000
Losing team	R200,000
Quarter-finals
Losing team	R400,000
Semi-finals
Losing team	R750,000
Final
Runner Up	R1,500,000
Winner	R4,000,000
