= South Africa national soccer team results (2010–2019) =

This is a list of the South Africa national football team results from 2010 to the present day.

== Results ==
South Africa's score is shown first in each case.

Date	Venue	Opponents	Score	Competition	Scorers	Att.	Ref.
27 January 2010	Moses Mabhida Stadium, Durban (H)	Zimbabwe	3–0	Friendly	Tshabalala 49', Mbuyane 76', Thwala 90'	35,000	
3 March 2010	FNB Stadium, Johannesburg (H)	Namibia	1–1	Friendly	Mphela 70'	35,000	
31 March 2010	Estadio Defensores del Chaco, Asunción (A)	Paraguay	1–1	Friendly	Tshabalala 71'		
22 April 2010	BRITA-Arena, Wiesbaden (N)	North Korea	0–0	Friendly	—	628	
28 April 2010	Bieberer Berg Stadion, Offenbach am Main (N)	Jamaica	2–0	Friendly	Moriri 50', Nomvete 85'	562	
16 May 2010	Mbombela Stadium, Mbombela (H)	Thailand	4–0	Friendly	Tshabalala 22', Mphela 30', 33', Parker 89'	30,000	
24 May 2010	Orlando Stadium, Soweto (H)	Bulgaria	1–1	Friendly	Sangweni 19'	25,000	
27 May 2010	FNB Stadium, Johannesburg (H)	Colombia	2–1	Friendly	Modise 18' (pen.), Mphela 58' (pen.)	76,000	
31 May 2010	Peter Mokaba Stadium, Polokwane (H)	Guatemala	5–0 (Note: The match was refereed by Ibrahim Chaibou of Niger. FIFA conducted an investigation into several friendlies officiated by Chaibou in the late 2000s and early 2010s, concluding that he had received bribes to fix many of those matches, which included the South Africa v Guatemala game as well as a match between Nigeria and Argentina in June 2011, among others. As a result, FIFA banned him for life and imposed a heavy fine.)	Friendly	Mphela 12' (pen.), 56' (pen.), Letsholonyane 25', Moriri 48', Parker 82'	40,000	
5 June 2010	Lucas Moripe Stadium, Atteridgeville (H)	Denmark	1–0	Friendly	Mphela 75'	25,000	
11 June 2010	FNB Stadium, Johannesburg (N)	Mexico	1–1	2010 FIFA World Cup	Tshabalala 55'	84,490	
16 June 2010	Loftus Versfeld Stadium, Pretoria (N)	Uruguay	0–3	2010 FIFA World Cup	—	42,658	
22 June 2010	Free State Stadium, Bloemfontein (N)	France	2–1	2010 FIFA World Cup	Khumalo 20', Mphela 37'	39,415	
11 August 2010	FNB Stadium, Johannesburg (H)	Ghana	1–0	Friendly	Mphela 42'		
4 September 2010	Mbombela Stadium, Mbombela (H)	Niger	2–0	2012 Africa Cup of Nations qualification	Mphela 12', Parker 45+3'		
10 October 2010	National Stadium, Freetown (A)	Sierra Leone	0–0	2012 Africa Cup of Nations qualification	—		
17 November 2010	Cape Town Stadium, Cape Town (H)	United States	0–1	Nelson Mandela Challenge	—	52,000	
9 February 2011	Royal Bafokeng Stadium, Rustenburg (H)	Kenya	2–0	Friendly	Somma 2', Pienaar 45+2'		
26 March 2011	Ellis Park Stadium, Johannesburg (H)	Egypt	1–0	2012 Africa Cup of Nations qualification	Mphela 90+3'		
14 May 2011	National Stadium, Dar es Salaam (A)	Tanzania	1–0	Friendly	Sangweni 44'		
5 June 2011	Cairo Military Academy Stadium, Cairo (A)	Egypt	0–0	2012 Africa Cup of Nations qualification	—		
10 August 2011	Ellis Park Stadium, Johannesburg (H)	Burkina Faso	3–0	Friendly	Mphela 14', Tshabalala 19', Mphela 52'	10,000	
4 September 2011	Stade Général Seyni Kountché, Niamey (A)	Niger	1–2	2012 Africa Cup of Nations qualification	Jali 70'		
8 October 2011	Mbombela Stadium, Mbombela (H)	Sierra Leone	0–0	2012 Africa Cup of Nations qualification	—		
12 November 2011	Nelson Mandela Bay Stadium, Port Elizabeth (H)	Ivory Coast	1–1	Nelson Mandela Challenge	Mphela 53'	28,000	
15 November 2011	Rufaro Stadium, Harare (A)	Zimbabwe	1–2	Friendly	Grobler 29'		
6 January 2012	Estadio de Bata, Bata (A)	Equatorial Guinea	0–0	Friendly	—		
29 February 2012	Moses Mabhida Stadium, Durban (H)	Senegal	0–0	Friendly	—	25,000	
3 June 2012	Royal Bafokeng Stadium, Rustenburg (H)	Ethiopia	1–1	2014 FIFA World Cup qualification	Mphela 76'	13,000	
9 June 2012	University of Botswana Stadium, Gaborone (A)	Botswana	1–1	2014 FIFA World Cup qualification	Gould 14'	7,500	
15 June 2012	Mbombela Stadium, Mbombela (H)	Gabon	3–0	Friendly	Tshabalala 42', Rantie 68', Mashaba 76'		
7 September 2012	Estádio do Morumbi, São Paulo (A)	Brazil	0–1	Friendly	—		
11 September 2012	Mbombela Stadium, Mbombela (H)	Mozambique	2–0	Friendly	Parker 7', 88'		
12 October 2012	National Stadium, Warsaw (A)	Poland	0–1	Friendly	—		
16 October 2012	Nyayo National Stadium, Nairobi (A)	Kenya	2–1	Friendly	Rantie 20', Parker 75'		
12 November 2012	FNB Stadium, Johannesburg (H)	Zambia	0–1	Nelson Mandela Challenge	—	17,000	
22 December 2012	Moses Mabhida Stadium, Durban (N)	Malawi	3–1	Friendly	Majoro 6', Tshabalala 10', Mahlangu 74 (pen.)		
8 January 2013	Cape Town Stadium, Cape Town (H)	Norway	0–1	Friendly	—	35,000	
12 January 2013	Orlando Stadium, Soweto (H)	Algeria	0–0	Friendly	—		
19 January 2013	FNB Stadium, Johannesburg (N)	Cape Verde	0–0	2013 Africa Cup of Nations	—	50,000	
23 January 2013	Moses Mabhida Stadium, Durban (N)	Angola	2–0	2013 Africa Cup of Nations	Sangweni 30', Majoro 62'	40,000	
27 January 2013	Moses Mabhida Stadium, Durban (N)	Morocco	2–2	2013 Africa Cup of Nations	Mahlangu 71', Sangweni 86'	45,000	
2 February 2013	Moses Mabhida Stadium, Durban (N)	Mali	1–1 (Note: South Africa lost 3–1 in a penalty shoot-out)	2013 Africa Cup of Nations	Rantie 31'	45,000	
23 March 2013	Cape Town Stadium, Cape Town (H)	Central African Republic	2–0	2014 FIFA World Cup qualification	Matlaba 33', Parker 71'	36,740	
2 June 2013	Setsoto Stadium, Maseru (A)	Lesotho	2–0	Friendly	Segolela 45+1', 60'		
8 June 2013	Stade Ahmadou Ahidjo, Yaoundé (A)	Central African Republic	3–0	2014 FIFA World Cup qualification	Parker 26', Tshabalala 43', Mashego 43'		
16 June 2013	Addis Ababa Stadium, Addis Ababa (A)	Ethiopia	1–2	2014 FIFA World Cup qualification	Parker 33'	22,000	
13 July 2013	Nkoloma Stadium, Lusaka (N)	Namibia	2–1	2013 COSAFA Cup	Shongwe 48', Kekana 62'	7,500	
17 July 2013	Levy Mwanawasa Stadium, Ndola (N)	Zambia	0–0 (Note: South Africa lost 5–3 in a penalty shoot-out)	2013 COSAFA Cup	—	35,000	
20 July 2013	Levy Mwanawasa Stadium, Ndola (N)	Lesotho	2–1	2013 COSAFA Cup	Masango 44', Kekana 54'	7,500	
14 August 2013	Moses Mabhida Stadium, Durban (H)	Nigeria	0–2	Friendly	—	27,200	
17 August 2013	FNB Stadium, Johannesburg (H)	Burkina Faso	2–0	Friendly	Tshabalala 22', Nomandela 90+3'		
6 September 2013	Moses Mabhida Stadium, Durban (H)	Botswana	4–1	2014 FIFA World Cup qualification	Erasmus 28', Furman 45', Parker 84', 89' (pen.)		
10 September 2013	Orlando Stadium, Soweto (H)	Zimbabwe	1–2	Friendly	Parker 90+6'		
11 October 2013	Stade Adrar, Agadir (A)	Morocco	1–1	Friendly	Rantie 9'	44,000	
15 November 2013	Somhlolo National Stadium, Mbabane (A)	Swaziland	3–0	Friendly	Letsholonyane 48', Bongani Zungu 49', Nthethe 63'	10,000	
19 November 2013	FNB Stadium, Johannesburg (H)	Spain	1–0	Friendly	Parker 56'	30,000	
11 January 2014	Cape Town Stadium, Cape Town (N)	Mozambique	3–1	2014 African Nations Championship	Parker 30' (pen.), 82', Kekana 58'	26,328	
15 January 2014	Cape Town Stadium, Cape Town (N)	Mali	1–1	2014 African Nations Championship	Parker 25' (pen.)	20,000	
19 January 2014	Cape Town Stadium, Cape Town (N)	Nigeria	1–3	2014 African Nations Championship	Parker 81' (pen.)	35,000	
5 March 2014	FNB Stadium, Johannesburg (H)	Brazil	0–5	Friendly	—	67,616	
26 May 2014	Stadium Australia, Sydney (A)	Australia	1–1	Friendly	Patosi 13'	50,468	
30 May 2014	Mount Smart Stadium, Auckland (A)	New Zealand	0–0	Friendly	—	9,266	
5 September 2014	Al-Merrikh Stadium, Omdurman (A)	Sudan	3–0	2015 Africa Cup of Nations qualification	Vilakazi 55', 61', Ndulula 79'		
10 September 2014	Cape Town Stadium, Cape Town (H)	Nigeria	0–0	2015 Africa Cup of Nations qualification	—		
11 October 2014	Stade Municipal, Pointe-Noire (A)	Congo	2–0	2015 Africa Cup of Nations qualification	Ndulula 52', Rantie 54'		
15 October 2014	Peter Mokaba Stadium, Polokwane (H)	Congo	0–0	2015 Africa Cup of Nations qualification	—		
15 November 2014	Moses Mabhida Stadium, Durban (H)	Sudan	2–1	2015 Africa Cup of Nations qualification	Serero 39', Rantie 53'		
19 November 2014	Akwa Ibom Stadium, Uyo (A)	Nigeria	2–2	2015 Africa Cup of Nations qualification	Rantie 41', 48'	60,000	
30 November 2014	Mbombela Stadium, Mbombela (H)	Ivory Coast	2–0	Friendly	Zungu 31', Zulu 52'	10,000	
4 January 2015	Orlando Stadium, Soweto (H)	Zambia	1–0	Friendly	Phala 81'	30,000	
10 January 2015	Stade d'Angondjé, Libreville (N)	Cameroon	1–1	Friendly	Vilakazi 76'	7,000	
19 January 2015	Estadio de Mongomo, Mongomo (N)	Algeria	1–3	2015 Africa Cup of Nations	Phala 51'	12,788	
23 January 2015	Estadio de Mongomo, Mongomo (N)	Senegal	1–1	2015 Africa Cup of Nations	Manyisa 47'	13,674	
27 January 2015	Estadio de Mongomo, Mongomo (N)	Ghana	1–2	2015 Africa Cup of Nations	Masango 17'	13,670	
25 March 2015	Somhlolo National Stadium, Lobamba (A)	Swaziland	3–1	Friendly	Hlatshwayo 51', Mnyamane 52', Masango 86'	7,000	
29 March 2015	Mbombela Stadium, Mbombela (H)	Nigeria	1–1	Friendly	Zungu 90+3'	18,526	
14 May 2015	Setsoto Stadium, Maseru (A)	Lesotho	0–0	Friendly	—		
16 May 2015	Setsoto Stadium, Maseru (A)	Lesotho	1–1	Friendly	Daniels 85' (pen.)		
24 May 2015	Moruleng Stadium, Saulspoort (N)	Botswana	0–0 (Note: South Africa lost 7–6 in a penalty shoot-out)	2015 COSAFA Cup	—		
27 May 2015	Royal Bafokeng Stadium, Rustenburg (N)	Malawi	0–0 (Note: South Africa lost 5–4 in a penalty shoot-out)	2015 COSAFA Cup	—	4,000	
13 June 2015	Moses Mabhida Stadium, Durban (H)	Gambia	0–0	2017 Africa Cup of Nations qualification	—		
16 June 2015	Cape Town Stadium, Cape Town (H)	Angola	2–1	Friendly	Gabuza 45+1', Patosi 68'	8,112	
20 June 2015	Dobsonville Stadium, Soweto (H)	Mauritius	3–0	2016 African Nations Championship qualification	Gabuza 26, Ntshangase 28', 44'		
5 July 2015	Anjalay Stadium, Belle Vue Harel (A)	Mauritius	2–0	2016 African Nations Championship qualification	Masango 69', Letlabika 84'		
5 September 2015	Office du Complexe Olympique, Nouakchott (A)	Mauritania	1–3	2017 Africa Cup of Nations qualification	Gabuza 68'		
8 September 2015	Orlando Stadium, Soweto (A)	Senegal	1–0	Friendly	Makola 78'		
8 October 2015	Estadio Edgardo Baltodano Briceño, Liberia (A)	Costa Rica	1–0	Friendly	Jali 9'	35,000	
13 October 2015	Estadio Olímpico Metropolitano, San Pedro Sula (A)	Honduras	1–1	Friendly	Mathoho 8'	7,000	
17 October 2015	Rand Stadium, Johannesburg (H)	Angola	0–2	2016 African Nations Championship qualification	—		
24 October 2015	Estádio 11 de Novembro, Talatona (A)	Angola	2–1	2016 African Nations Championship qualification	Fabrício 29' (o.g.), Lakay 90'	35,000	
13 November 2015	Estádio Nacional de Ombaka, Benguela (A)	Angola	3–1	2018 FIFA World Cup qualification	Rankie 14', Gabuza 20', Jali 81' (pen.)	25,000	
17 November 2015	Moses Mabhida Stadium, Durban (H)	Angola	1–0	2018 FIFA World Cup qualification	Diniz 66' (o.g.)	17,152	
26 March 2016	Limbe Stadium, Limbe (A)	Cameroon	2–2	2017 Africa Cup of Nations qualification	Rantie 17', Kekana 50'		
29 March 2016	Moses Mabhida Stadium, Durban (H)	Cameroon	0–0	2017 Africa Cup of Nations qualification	—		
4 June 2016	Independence Stadium, Bakau (A)	Gambia	4–0	2017 Africa Cup of Nations qualification	Gabuza 31', 37', Dolly 55', Dikgacoi 78'		
18 June 2016	Sam Nujoma Stadium, Windhoek (N)	Lesotho	1–1 (Note: South Africa won 4–2 in a penalty shoot-out)	2016 COSAFA Cup	Motupa 66'		
22 June 2016	Sam Nujoma Stadium, Windhoek (N)	Eswatini	5–1	2016 COSAFA Cup	Kutumela 52', Phiri 57', Masuku 60', Moseamedi 75', Masuku 83'		
25 June 2016	Sam Nujoma Stadium, Windhoek (N)	Botswana	3–2	2016 COSAFA Cup	Motupa 33' (pen.), 88' (pen.), Kutumela 66'		
2 September 2016	Mbombela Stadium, Mbombela (H)	Mauritania	1–1	2017 Africa Cup of Nations qualification	Kekana 26'	14,000	
6 September 2016	Orlando Stadium, Soweto (H)	Egypt	1–0	Friendly	Makola 7'	19,000	
8 October 2016	Stade du 4 Août, Ouagadougou (A)	Burkina Faso	1–1	2018 FIFA World Cup qualification	Furman 80'	32,800	
11 October 2016	Moses Mabhida Stadium, Durban (H)	Ghana	1–1	Friendly	Patosi 52'	9,674	
12 November 2016	Peter Mokaba Stadium, Polokwane (H)	Senegal	2–1 (Note: On 6 September 2017, the Bureau for the FIFA World Cup Qualifiers annulled the result of the South Africa v Senegal match on 12 November 2016 and ordered that it be replayed within the November 2017 international window. This decision was confirmed by the Organising Committee for FIFA Competitions on 14 September 2017. Originally South Africa had defeated Senegal 2–1. Match referee Joseph Lamptey was banned for life by the FIFA Disciplinary Committee on 20 March 2017 for "unlawfully influencing" the match after issuing a penalty for handball against Senegal. The decision was upheld by the FIFA Appeal Committee, and later the Court of Arbitration for Sport on 6 September 2017.)	2018 FIFA World Cup qualification	Hlatshwayo 42' (pen.), Serero 45'	26,179	
15 November 2016	Estádio do Zimpeto, Maputo (A)	Mozambique	1–1	Friendly	Grobler 53'	15,000	
25 March 2017	Moses Mabhida Stadium, Durban (H)	Guinea-Bissau	3–1	Friendly	Erasmus 35' (pen.), Tau 70', Jali 89' (pen.)	11,074	
28 March 2017	Buffalo City Stadium, East London (H)	Angola	0–0	Friendly	—	11,700	
10 June 2017	Godswill Akpabio International Stadium, Uyo (A)	Nigeria	2–0	2019 Africa Cup of Nations qualification	Rantie 54', Dolly 80'		
13 June 2017	Moruleng Stadium, Saulspoort (H)	Zambia	1–2	Friendly	Manyama 23'	10,000	
2 July 2017	Royal Bafokeng Stadium, Rustenburg (N)	Tanzania	0–1	2017 COSAFA Cup	—		
4 July 2017	Moruleng Stadium, Saulspoort (N)	Botswana	2–0	2017 COSAFA Cup	Norodien 33', Moseamedi 90+3'		
7 July 2017	Moruleng Stadium, Saulspoort (N)	Namibia	1–0	2017 COSAFA Cup	Mokate 36'		
15 July 2017	Francistown Stadium, Francistown (A)	Botswana	2–0	2018 African Nations Championship qualification	Moon 28', Motupa 72'	3,000	
22 July 2017	Moruleng Stadium, Saulspoort (H)	Botswana	1–0	2018 African Nations Championship qualification	Moon 12'	5,500	
12 August 2017	Harry Gwala Stadium, Pietermaritzburg (H)	Zambia	2–2	2018 African Nations Championship qualification	Motupa 31', Booysen 52'	8,000	
19 August 2017	Levy Mwanawasa Stadium, Ndola (A)	Zambia	0–2	2018 African Nations Championship qualification	—	13,573	
1 September 2017	Estádio da Várzea, Praia (A)	Cape Verde	1–2	2018 FIFA World Cup qualification	Rantie 14'	4,000	
5 September 2017	Moses Mabhida Stadium, Durban (H)	Cape Verde	1–2	2018 FIFA World Cup qualification	Jali 89'	15,000	
7 October 2017	FNB Stadium, Johannesburg (H)	Burkina Faso	3–1	2018 FIFA World Cup qualification	Tau 1', Zwane 33', Vilakazi 45'	15,506	
10 November 2017	Peter Mokaba Stadium, Polokwane (H)	Senegal	0–2	2018 FIFA World Cup qualification	—	40,000	
14 November 2017	Stade Léopold Sédar Senghor, Dakar (A)	Senegal	1–2	2018 FIFA World Cup qualification	Tau 65'	50,000	
21 March 2018	Levy Mwanawasa Stadium, Ndola (N)	Angola	1–1 (Note: South Africa won 6–5 in a penalty shoot-out)	2018 Four Nations Tournament	Mothiba 51'	2,000	
24 March 2018	Levy Mwanawasa Stadium, Ndola (N)	Zambia	2–0	2018 Four Nations Tournament	Tau 16', Mothiba 90'		
3 June 2018	Peter Mokaba Stadium, Polokwane (N)	Madagascar	0–0 (Note: South Africa lost 4–3 in a penalty shoot-out)	2018 COSAFA Cup	—		
5 June 2018	Peter Mokaba Stadium, Polokwane (N)	Namibia	4–1	2018 COSAFA Cup	Modiba 26' (pen.), Maboe 29', 40', Xulu 54'		
8 June 2018	Peter Mokaba Stadium, Polokwane (N)	Botswana	3–0	2018 COSAFA Cup	Madisha 39', Modiba 78', Maboe 89'		
8 September 2018	Moses Mabhida Stadium, Durban (H)	Libya	0–0	2019 Africa Cup of Nations qualification	—		
13 October 2018	FNB Stadium, Johannesburg (H)	Seychelles	6–0	2019 Africa Cup of Nations qualification	Hoareau 23' (o.g.), Hlatshwayo 25', Mothiba 27', Tau 74', Ndlovu 81', Mokoena 90'		
16 October 2018	Stade Linité, Victoria (A)	Seychelles	0–0	2019 Africa Cup of Nations qualification	—		
17 November 2018	FNB Stadium, Johannesburg (H)	Nigeria	1–1	2019 Africa Cup of Nations qualification	Mothiba 26'		
20 November 2018	Moses Mabhida Stadium, Durban (H)	Paraguay	1–1	Friendly	Tau 90'	8,868	
24 March 2019	Stade Taïeb Mhiri, Sfax (A)	Libya	2–1	2019 Africa Cup of Nations qualification	Tau 49', 68'		
2 June 2019	Princess Magogo Stadium, Durban (N)	Botswana	2–2	2019 COSAFA Cup	Singh 19', Margeman 28'		
4 June 2019	Princess Magogo Stadium, Durban (N)	Uganda	1–1	2019 COSAFA Cup	Singh 72'		
7 June 2019	Moses Mabhida Stadium, Durban (N)	Malawi	0–0 (Note: South Africa won 5–4 in a penalty shoot-out)	2019 COSAFA Cup	—		
15 June 2019	Police Officers' Club Stadium, Dubai	Ghana	0–0	Friendly	—	235	
24 June 2019	Al Salam Stadium, Cairo (N)	Ivory Coast	0–1	2019 Africa Cup of Nations	—	4,961	
28 June 2019	Al Salam Stadium, Cairo (N)	Namibia	1–0	2019 Africa Cup of Nations	Zungu 68'	16,090	
1 July 2019	Al Salam Stadium, Cairo (N)	Morocco	0–1	2019 Africa Cup of Nations	—	12,098	
6 July 2019	Cairo International Stadium, Cairo (N)	Egypt	1–0	2019 Africa Cup of Nations	Lorch 85'	75,000	
10 July 2019	Cairo International Stadium, Cairo (N)	Nigeria	1–2	2019 Africa Cup of Nations	Zungu 71'	48,343	
28 July 2019	Setsoto Stadium, Maseru (A)	Lesotho	2–3	2020 African Nations Championship qualification	Malepe 45' (pen.), Phewa 80'	20,000	
4 August 2019	Dobsonville Stadium, Soweto (H)	Lesotho	0–3	2020 African Nations Championship qualification	—	4,700	
13 October 2019	Nelson Mandela Bay Stadium, Port Elizabeth (H)	Mali	2–1	Friendly	Furman 24' (pen.), Zwane 45'	18,017	
14 November 2019	Cape Coast Sports Stadium, Cape Coast (A)	Ghana	0–2	2021 Africa Cup of Nations qualification	—	15,000	
17 November 2019	Orlando Stadium, Johannesburg (H)	Sudan	1–0	2021 Africa Cup of Nations qualification	Phiri 45'		
