= List of Premier Soccer League hat-tricks =

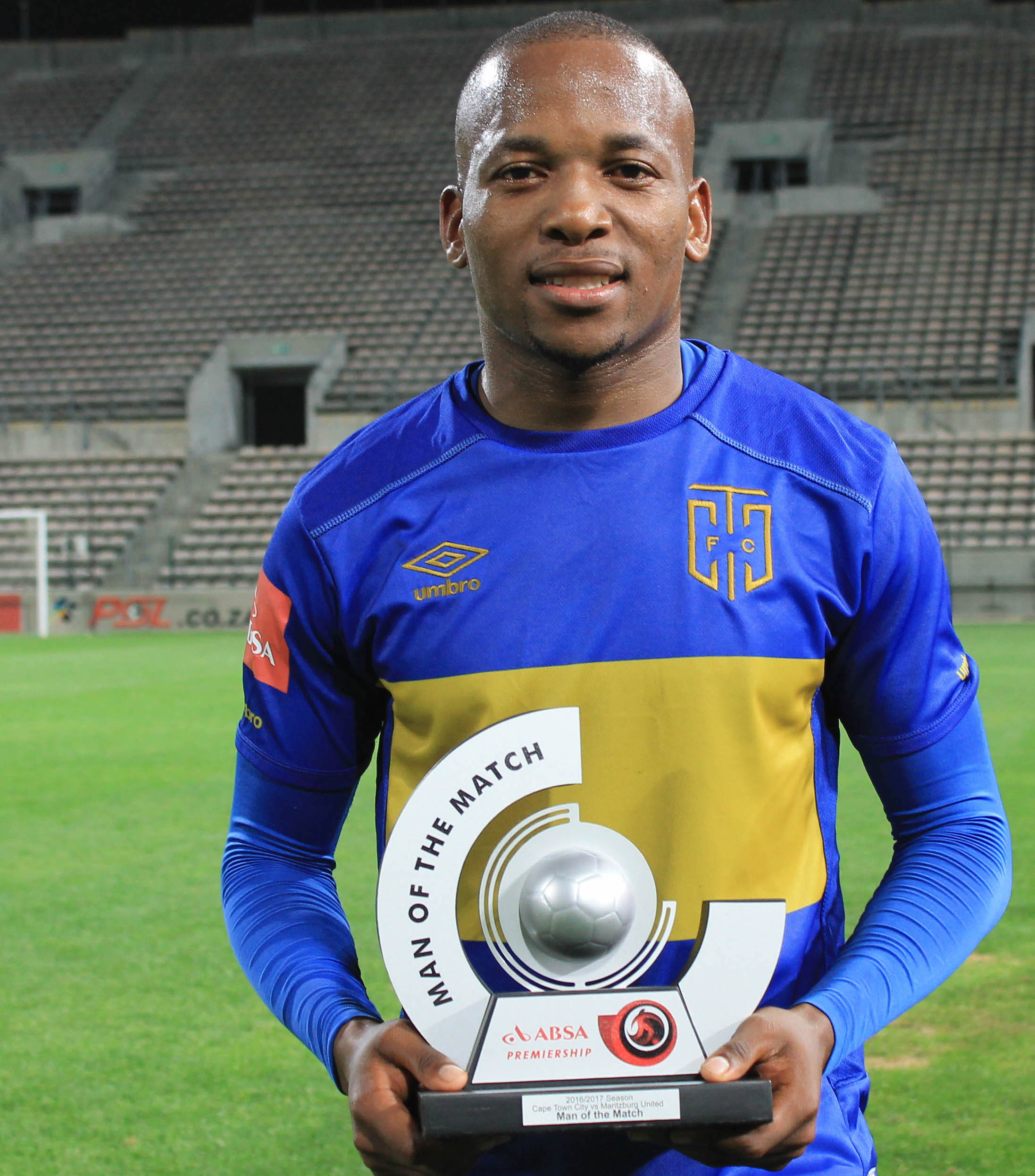
Aubrey Ngoma (pictured here during his time with Cape Town City) is one of the players to score a hat-trick of more than three goals.

The first hat-trick in the Premier Soccer League was scored in 1996, and there have been over 150 hat-tricks scored since then. Pollen Ndlanya is the player with most hat-tricks, having scored six. The fastest hat-trick was scored by James Chamanga, between the 20th and 25th minute for Moroka Swallows in December 2007. Richard Henyekane is the player with most hat-tricks in a season for Golden Arrows, having scored three in 2008–09 season. Peter Shalulile is the first player with back to back hat-trick in 2021–22 season. Bonfils-Caleb Bimenyimana is the first player to score hat-trick with only penalties 2022–23 season.

== Hat-tricks ==
Key
^{4}	Player scored four goals
^{5}	Player scored five goals
†	Player scored hat-trick as a substitute
*	The home team

Note: The results column shows the scorer's team score first

Player	Nationality	For	Result	Against	Date	Ref
Collins Mbesuma	Zambia	Kaizer Chiefs	4–1	Dynamos*	2004	
Collins Mbesuma	Zambia	Moroka Swallows*	4–3	Mamelodi Sundowns F.C.*	2005	
James Chamanga^{5}	Zambia	Moroka Swallows*	6–2	Platinum Stars	9 December 2007	
Thulasizwe Mbuyane	South Africa	Orlando Pirates*	4–0	Jomo Cosmos	29 August 2009	
Ayanda Dlamini	South Africa	AmaZulu	4–0	Moroka Swallows*	16 December 2009	
Bradley Grobler	South Africa	Platinum Stars*	3–1	Mpumalanga Black Aces	2 February 2011	
Lennox Bacela	South Africa	Bloemfontein Celtic*	5–0	SuperSport United	27 February 2011	
Anthony Laffor	Liberia	SuperSport United*	5–2	Santos FC	16 April 2011	
Bryce Moon	South Africa	Golden Arrows*	3–2	AmaZulu	7 May 2011	
Nyasha Mushekwi	Zimbabwe	Mamelodi Sundowns*	3–1	Bloemfontein Celtic	21 May 2011	
Siyabonga Nomvethe	South Africa	Moroka Swallows*	3–2	Golden Arrows	29 April 2012	
Bernard Parker^{4}	South Africa	Kaizer Chiefs	6–0	AmaZulu*	11 August 2012	
Aubrey Ngoma^{4}	South Africa	University of Pretoria	5–1	Ajax Cape Town*	29 September 2012	
Edward Manqele	South Africa	Moroka Swallows*	3–2	Mpumalanga Black Aces	30 August 2013	
Sibusiso Vilakazi	South Africa	Bidvest Wits*	3–2	SuperSport United	25 February 2014	
Richard Henyekane	South Africa	Free State Stars	3–1	Bidvest Wits*	15 March 2014	
Reginald Mlaba	South Africa	Mpumalanga Black Aces*	5–2	Moroka Swallows	15 March 2014	
Eleazar Rodgers	South Africa	Platinum Stars*	4–2	AmaZulu	22 November 2014	
Sibusiso Vilakazi	South Africa	Bidvest Wits*	4–2	Ajax Cape Town	10 December 2014	
Mogakolodi Ngele	Botswana	Platinum Stars	3–3	Orlando Pirates*	8 April 2015	
Thobani Mncwango^{4}	South Africa	Polokwane City*	4–1	SuperSport United	16 January 2016	
James Keene	England	Bidvest Wits*	5–0	Polokwane City	22 January 2016	
Jeremy Brockie	New Zealand	SuperSport United	4–2	Jomo Cosmos*	27 February 2016	
Lerato Manzini	South Africa	Chippa United*	4–1	Platinum Stars	27 April 2016	
Gabadinho Mhango^{4}†	Malawi	Golden Arrows	4–2	Mpumalanga Black Aces*	27 April 2016	
Anthony Laffor	Liberia	Mamelodi Sundowns	3–0	University of Pretoria*	4 May 2016	
Tendai Ndoro	Zimbabwe	Orlando Pirates*	3–1	Golden Arrows	24 August 2016	
Bhongolwethu Jayiya	South Africa	Cape Town City*	4–1	Chippa United	3 April 2017	
Rhulani Manzini†	South Africa	Chippa United*	3–0	SuperSport United	17 May 2017	
Mwape Musonda	Zambia	Black Leopards*	3–2	Chippa United	10 March 2019	
Charlton Mashumba	Zimbabwe	Polokwane City	3–5	Cape Town City*	6 November 2019	
Samir Nurković	Serbia	Kaizer Chiefs*	5–3	Bloemfontein Celtic	7 December 2019	
Gabadinho Mhango	Malawi	Orlando Pirates	4–1	Polokwane City*	7 January 2020	
Fagrie Lakay	South Africa	Cape Town City	4–1	Golden Arrows*	29 August 2020	
Lebohang Maboe	South Africa	Mamelodi Sundowns*	3–0	Black Leopards	5 September 2020	
Bienvenu Eva Nga	Cameroon	Chippa United*	3–1	Maritzburg United	3 November 2020	
Themba Zwane	South Africa	Mamelodi Sundowns*	4–3	Amazulu	23 November 2020	
Lebogang Manyama	South Africa	Kaizer Chiefs*	3–2	Golden Arrows	2 June 2021	
Peter Shalulile	Namibia	Mamelodi Sundowns	4–2	Moroka Swallows*	6 April 2022	
Peter Shalulile	Namibia	Mamelodi Sundowns*	6–0	Golden Arrows	12 April 2022	
Bonfils-Caleb Bimenyimana	Burundi	Kaizer Chiefs	3–1	Stellenbosch F.C.*	9 October 2022	
Monnapule Saleng	South Africa	Orlando Pirates	4–1	Swallows F.C.*	3 March 2023	
Ranga Chivaviro	South Africa	Marumo Gallants F.C.*	3–1	Chippa United	12 April 2023	
Augustine Chidi Kwem	Nigeria	AmaZulu F.C.*	3–1	Lamontville Golden Arrows F.C.	12 November 2023	
Lucas Ribeiro Costa	Brazil	Mamelodi Sundowns F.C.*	3–0	AmaZulu F.C.	27 February 2024	
Tshegofatso Mabasa	South Africa	Orlando Pirates*	7–1	Golden Arrows F.C.	6 April 2024	
Iqraam Rayners^{5}	South Africa	Stellenbosch F.C.*	5–0	Polokwane City F.C.	27 April 2024	
Tshegofatso Mabasa	South Africa	Orlando Pirates*	8–1	Marumo Gallants	24 December 2024	
Andy Boyeli	Democratic Republic of the Congo	SuperSport United F.C.	0–3	Sekhukhune United F.C.*	12 January 2025	

== Multiple hat-tricks ==
The following table lists the number of hat-tricks scored by players who have scored two or more hat-tricks.

Rank	Player	Hat-tricks
1	(Liberia) Anthony Laffor	2
1	(South Africa) Tshegofatso Mabasa	2
1	(Malawi) Gabadinho Mhango	2
1	(Namibia) Peter Shalulile	2
1	(South Africa) Sibusiso Vilakazi	2

== Hat-tricks by clubs ==
Rank	Club	Hat-tricks
1	Mamelodi Sundowns	7
2	Orlando Pirates	6
3	Kaizer Chiefs	5
4	Moroka Swallows	3
4	Platinum Stars	3
6	Lamontville Golden Arrows	2
6	SuperSport United	2
6	AmaZulu F.C.	2
9	Bloemfontein Celtic	1
9	Marumo Gallants F.C.	1
9	Stellenbosch F.C.	1

== Hat-tricks by nationality ==
The following table lists the number of hat-tricks scored by players from a single nation.

Rank	Nation	Hat-tricks
1	South Africa	25
2	Zimbabwe	3
3	Liberia	2
3	Malawi	2
3	Namibia	2
3	Zambia	2
7	Botswana	1
7	Brazil	1
7	Burundi	1
7	Cameroon	1
7	Democratic Republic of Congo	1
7	England	1
7	New Zealand	1
7	Nigeria	1
7	Serbia	1
