= 2016 MTN 8 =

Tournament details
- Country: South Africa
- Teams: 8

Final positions
- Champions: Wits
- Runners-up: Mamelodi Sundowns

Tournament statistics
- Matches played: 9

The 2016 MTN 8 was the 42nd edition of South Africa's annual soccer cup competition, the MTN 8. It featured the top eight teams of the Premier Soccer League at the end of the 2015-16 season.

== Teams ==
The eight teams that competed in the MTN 8 knockout competition are (listed according to their finishing position in the 2015/2016 Premier Soccer League Season):

1. Mamelodi Sundowns
2. Bidvest Wits
3. Platinum Stars
4. Cape Town City
5. Kaizer Chiefs
6. Chippa United
7. Orlando Pirates
8. SuperSport United

== Results ==
=== Quarter-finals ===
26 August 2016
20h00

Cape Town City	1–0	Kaizer Chiefs
7' Sim

Cape Town Stadium, Cape Town
27 August 2016
15h00

Platinum Stars	0–2	Chippa United
		9' Manzini; 79' Masuku

Royal Bafokeng Stadium, Phokeng
27 August 2016
20h15

Wits	2–1	Orlando Pirates
38' Mkhwanazi; 75' Hlatshwayo		16' Manyisa

Bidvest Stadium, Johannesburg
28 August 2016
15h00

Mamelodi Sundowns	3–1	Supersport United
18' Arendse; 74' Vilakazi; 80' Billiat		45' Nkhatha

Loftus Versfeld Stadium, Pretoria

=== Semi-finals ===
==== 1st leg ====
10 September 2016
20h15

Wits	3–0	Cape Town City
22' Rogers; 38' Pelembe; 44' Mhango

Bidvest Stadium, Johannesburg
11 September 2016
15h00

Chippa United	0–0	Mamelodi Sundowns

Nelson Mandela Bay Stadium, Port Elizabeth

==== 2nd leg ====
17 September 2016
20h15

Cape Town City	0–0	Wits

Cape Town Stadium, Cape Town
28 August 2016
15h00

Mamelodi Sundowns	1–0	Chippa United
75' Laffor

Lucas Moripe Stadium, Pretoria

=== Final ===
1 October 2016
17:00

Wits	3–0	Mamelodi Sundowns
Klate 1'; Rodgers 20'; Klate 62'

Mbombela Stadium, Mbombela
