= Olaleng Shaku =

South African soccer player

Personal information
- Full name: Dineo Olaleng Shaku
- Date of birth: 27 March 1988 (age 38)
- Position: Defender

Team information
- Current team: Baroka

Senior career*
Years	Team	Apps	(Gls)
2008–2017	Baroka	129+	(5+)
2018–?	Witbank Spurs		
2021–2024	Platinum City Rovers	78	(2)
2024–	Baroka	8	(0)
- * Club domestic league appearances and goals as of 13 February 2025

Dineo Olaleng Shaku (born 27 March 1988) is a South African soccer player who plays as a defender for Baroka.

== Career ==
Shaku joined Baroka in 2008, playing in the Second Division. Shaku and Baroka managed to win promotion to the 2013–14 National First Division, and after three years there, to the Premier Division. Shaku made his first-tier debut in the 2016–17 South African Premier Division. As he played most of the league games for several years straight, Shaku also became team captain.

In late February 2018, Shaku and goalkeeper Oscarine Masuluke were accused of drinking on the team bus after a match, and were sacked by Baroka. After a little more than a week, Shaku appeared to agree to a transfer to Witbank Spurs, though the transfer window was closed. Shaku was ready for the 2018–19 National First Division campaign, but only played 12 games, and Witbank Spurs were also relegated to the third tier.

Shaku later served as team captain at Platinum City Rovers. In the summer of 2024, he trained with his old club Baroka, and was allowed to rejoin the now-First Division club. He was a part of a large influx of 11 new players. According to a journalist, Shaku "kept the team’s defence solid with combative style of defending".
