= Robyn Johannes =

South African footballer

Personal information
- Full name: Robyn Johannes
- Date of birth: 23 August 1986 (age 40)
- Place of birth: Cape Town, South Africa
- Height: 1.81 m (5 ft 11 in)
- Position: Centre back

Youth career
- Parkhurst Ambassadors
- Strandfontein FC
- Wolverhampton FC
- Hellenic FC
- Rygersdal FC
- Pretoria University

Senior career*
Years	Team	Apps	(Gls)
2004–2005	Pretoria University	20	(0)
2005–2010	Mamelodi Sundowns	40	(0)
2010–2012	Orlando Pirates	16	(1)
2011–2012	→ Golden Arrows (loan)	20	(0)
2013–2014	Maritzburg United	8	(0)
2015–2016	AmaZulu	47	(0)
2016–2018	Cape Town City	43	(0)
2018–2019	Bidvest Wits	22	(2)
2019–2022	Stellenbosch	48	(1)

International career
2005–2008, 2017	South Africa	5	
- * Club domestic league appearances and goals as of 19:33, 21 February 2020 (UTC)

Robyn Johannes (born 23 August 1986) is a South African former professional soccer player who played as a central defender. He last played for and captained Stellenbosch FC in the Premier Soccer League. Johannes had an illustrious 18-year career in South African football, playing for top clubs including Mamelodi Sundowns F.C., Orlando Pirates F.C., Bidvest Wits F.C., Cape Town City F.C., and Stellenbosch F.C. He is renowned for his exceptional passing range, composure, and leadership qualities. Throughout his career, he won all major domestic trophies in South African football.

Born in Strandfontein, Mitchell's Plain, Johannes began his football journey at youth clubs like Parkhurst Ambassadors, Hellenic F.C., and Rygersdal F.C. He transitioned into professional football with University of Pretoria F.C., before making his Premier Soccer League debut with Mamelodi Sundowns F.C.

In 2022, after retiring from professional football, Johannes introduced Coerver Coaching, the world's leading soccer skills teaching method, to the Western Cape. He has since hosted "Play Like The Stars" clinics in the Helderberg region and partnered with schools across the Helderberg and Cape Town. Through this partnership, Johannes provides coaching to children aged 4 to 16, aiming to develop their technical football skills using Coerver's globally recognised methods.

== Club career ==
=== University of Pretoria ===
Robyn joined Tuks Football Academy. "[...] he left the Mother city to join the University of Pretoria youth set-up at the tender age of 15." He was part of University of Pretoria promotion from Castle League to Vodacom League and then to the National First Division, where he was captain of the team.

=== Mamelodi Sundowns ===
Robyn signed with Mamelodi Sundowns in 2004, where he made his first PSL debut. His 5 year spell at the club was highly successful. The team won two league titles in 2005-06 and 2006-07. He played his first cup final at the Netbank Cup, winning against Mpumalanga Black Aces in 2008. In addition, he appeared in the CAF Champions League.

In 2006, Robyn tore his ACL during a match, which left him on the sidelines for a year.

=== Orlando Pirates ===
Robyn transferred to Orlando Pirates in 2010. In his first season, the team won the treble under manager Dutch legend Ruud Krol. "Orlando Pirates completed a historic treble by beating second-tier Black Leopards 3-1 in the South African FA Cup final in Nelspruit."

=== Golden Arrows ===
In 2011, Robyn was on loan for the remaining of the season at Golden Arrows.

=== Maritzburg United ===
Robyn spent a season at Maritzburg United in 2013, where he endured a series of injuries that left him unable to play many games.

=== AmaZulu ===
Robyn signed with AmaZulu in 2015. After a challenging season, the club got relegated. Robyn played one season.

=== Cape Town City ===
In 2016, Johannes signed with reformed team Cape Town City by manager Eric Tinkler. "[...] the former Orlando Pirates man has put pen to paper on a two-year deal with the Cape side". The team's first season was triumphant, winning the 2016 Telkom Knockout cup, as well as achieving third place in the log. The following year, South African football legend Benni McCarthy was appointed manager at the club. In 2017, the centre-back was named captain. In 2017, the Citizens were runners-up in the MTN8.

=== Bidvest Wits ===
Robyn joined multiple league winner coach Gavin Hunt in 2018.

=== Stellenbosch FC ===
The defender transferred in 2019 to newly promoted Stellenbosch FC. Johannes signed a two-year deal with an option to renew for a further year. Robyn was appointed captain in season 2020-21. On the 25th of October 2020, Robyn scored a penalty goal against Moroka Swallows.

“Robyn Johannes stole the show last night winning the Players Player of the year as well as the Footballer of the Year Award."

== International career ==
He made his international debut in a COSAFA Cup match against the Seychelles on 26 February 2005.

== Style of play ==
Robyn is known for his excellent passing range, continuously packing high scores. "Cape Town City’s Robyn Johannes continues to have the highest passing accuracy in the Absa Premiership, with a few Orlando Pirates players following behind on the charts. Johannes is currently topping the charts with his accuracy on 93.1 %."
