= Vincent Kobola =

South African soccer player

Personal information
- Full name: Vincent Phaladi Kobola
- Date of birth: 8 January 1985 (age 41)
- Place of birth: Polokwane, South Africa
- Height: 1.72 m (5 ft 8 in)
- Position: Defender

Team information
- Current team: Baroka (manager)

Senior career*
Years	Team	Apps	(Gls)
2009–2011	Moroka Swallows	34	(1)
2011	Jomo Cosmos	13	(0)
2012	Moroka Swallows	1	(0)
2012–2013	University of Pretoria	6	(0)
2013–2016	Mpumalanga Black Aces	42	(0)
2016–2018	Cape Town City	18	(0)

Managerial career
- 2018: Chippa United (assistant)
- 2019–2020: Maritzburg United (assistant)
- 2021–2022: Baroka (assistant)
- 2022: Baroka
- * Club domestic league appearances and goals

Vincent Phaladi Kobola (born 8 January 1985) is a South African soccer manager and former player who has been the manager of Baroka. As a player, Kobola played as a defender.

== Playing career ==
He is a seasoned PSL player, having played local, top flight football for Moroka Swallows, Jomo Cosmos, University of Pretoria and Mpumalanga Black Aces.

== Coaching career ==
Kobola decided to hang up his boots at the end of the 2017/18 season. On 25 August 2018, Kobola was appointed as the assistant manager of Eric Tinkler at Chippa United. In the beginning of December 2018, Tinkler was fired. A few days later, Kobola also left the club.

On 30 January 2019, Eric Tinkler became the manager of Maritzburg United, and once again, he recruited Kobola as his assistant manager. He became assistant manager at Baroka, and four games before the end of the 2021–22 season he was promoted to manager. Baroka was relegated, but Kobola stayed on as manager. He was replaced in late 2022.
