= Matt Sim =

Australian professional footballer (born 1988)

Personal information
- Full name: Matthew Sim
- Date of birth: 18 April 1988 (age 38)
- Place of birth: Sydney, New South Wales, Australia
- Height: 1.77 m (5 ft 9 1/2 in)
- Positions: Midfielder; winger

Youth career
- 1999-2004: Northern Tigers
- 2007-2009: Manly United
- 2009–2010: Newcastle Jets

Senior career*
Years	Team	Apps	(Gls)
2005-2006	North West Sydney Spirit FC	4	(2)
2010-2013	Manly United	70	(19)
2014	Sutherland Sharks	0	(0)
2014	→ Central Coast Mariners (loan)	4	(0)
2014–2016	Central Coast Mariners	32	(2)
2016	Western Sydney Wanderers	1	(0)
2016-2017	Cape Town City	9	(2)
2017–2021	Sydney United	101	(29)
2022–2023	Manly United	39	(12)
Total		260	(66)
- * Club domestic league appearances and goals as of 6 October 2023

Matthew Sim (born 18 April 1988) is a current Australian football coach and former Australian professional footballer who played as a left or right sided / central midfielder. Matt also has an English passport through his family's heritage.

== Playing career ==
Sim made his debut for Central Coast on 21 February against Wellington Phoenix. He played the whole game as the Mariners lost 4–1.

On 14 October 2014, Sim came off the bench in the 71st minute in Central Coast Mariners' FFA Cup clash with Palm Beach Sharks with the score at 1–0 to his side. He went on to score 4 goals in the 19 minutes that he played. Sim finished the 2014 FFA Cup with 5 goals in 3 games.

Sim has also been a part of two Asian Champions League campaigns for the Mariners in 2014 and 2015.

On 1 February 2016, the Western Sydney Wanderers announced that they had signed Sim until the end of the 2015–16 season. On 5 May 2016, after making only one appearance off the bench for the club, Sim was released by the Wanderers.

Sim signed with South African Premier Division club Cape Town City in July 2016.

On 23 August 2016, Sim made his South African Premier Division competitive debut against Polokwane City in Cape Town City's inaugural game. Sim got an assist by setting up the first goal in the 2–0 win. Three days later Sim and Cape Town City took on Kaizer Chiefs in the MTN 8 Cup Quarter Final. Sim scored his first goal for the club in the 7th minute to give City a 1–0 win and a historic victory.

At the end of 2016, Sim left Cape Town City for personal reasons. He made 14 appearances in all competitions for the club.

Upon returning to Australia Sim joined former NSL giants Sydney United 58. Sim spent 5 successful seasons at the club in which he appeared in over 100 league games for the club and won the NSW NPL 2020 Grand final.

In 2022 Sim returned to Manly United FC.

Sim joined Sydney FC at the end of 2021 as their U20 Head Coach, winning the U20 NSW NPL championship in 2022 and currently works for Sydney FC as their Assistant NPL coach.

== Honours ==
=== Club ===
Manly United

- Waratah Cup: 2011

Cape Town City

- Telkom Knockout: 2016

Sydney United:

- National Premier Leagues NSW Championship: 2020

=== Individual ===
- National Premier Leagues NSW Team of the Year: 2013

== See also ==
- List of Central Coast Mariners FC players
- List of Western Sydney Wanderers FC players
