= Cleopas Dube =

Zimbabwean professional footballer (born 1990)

Personal information
- Date of birth: 29 March 1990 (age 36)
- Place of birth: Hwange, Zimbabwe
- Position: Forward

Team information
- Current team: Uthongathi

Senior career*
Years	Team	Apps	(Gls)
2013	ZPC Hwange		
2013–2014	Highlanders		
2013	→ Bulawayo Chiefs (loan)		
2014–2016	Witbank Spurs	42	(14)
2016	Baroka	10	(1)
2017	Stellenbosch	12	(0)
2017	Royal Eagles	2	(1)
2018–2019	Witbank Spurs	31	(5)
2019–	Uthongathi	9	(2)
- * Club domestic league appearances and goals as of 19:25, 6 July 2020 (UTC)

Cleopas Dube (born 29 March 1990) is a Zimbabwean professional footballer who plays as a forward for Uthongathi.

== Career ==
Dube began his footballing career in Zimbabwe with ZPC Hwange. He left in 2013 to join Highlanders, before being loaned out to Bulawayo Chiefs. In 2014, Dube joined National First Division side Witbank Spurs in South Africa. He made his Spurs and professional career debut on 31 August in a league win against Cape Town All Stars. In his next match for the club, on 14 September, Dube scored his first goal in a defeat to Highlands Park. That was his only goal in 2014–15, but he subsequently scored thirteen in twenty-four in 2015–16. Ahead of 2016–17, Dube joined newly promoted South African Premier Division club Baroka.

Dube scored once in ten appearances before leaving Baroka in January 2017. In February 2017, after leaving Baroka, Dube joined National First Division side Stellenbosch. He made sixteen appearances in all competitions for the club in 2016–17. In July, Dube joined fellow NFD side Royal Eagles. He made his debut against Uthongathi, prior to scoring his first goal in his second match versus Highlands Park; the same opponent he scored his first Spurs goal for. Dube rejoined Witbank Spurs in January 2018. He scored in his first match back, getting a late consolation in a 2–1 defeat to Ubuntu Cape Town on 7 January.

In June 2019, following relegation with Witbank, Dube remained in the National First Division after agreeing terms with Uthongathi.

== Career statistics ==
As of 6 July 2020.

Club statistics
Club	Season	League			Cup		League Cup		Continental		Other		Total	
Club	Season	Division	Apps	Goals	Apps	Goals	Apps	Goals	Apps	Goals	Apps	Goals	Apps	Goals
Stellenbosch	2016–17	National First Division	12	0	1	0	—		—		3 (Note: Appearance(s) in the National First Division play-offs)	0	16	0
Royal Eagles	2017–18	National First Division	2	1	0	0	—		—		0	0	2	1
Witbank Spurs	2017–18	National First Division	8	2	—		—		—		0	0	8	2
Witbank Spurs	2018–19	National First Division	23	3	1	0	—		—		0	0	24	3
Witbank Spurs	Total		31	5	1	0	—		—		0	0	32	5
Uthongathi	2019–20	National First Division	9	2	2	1	—		—		0	0	11	3
Career total			54	8	4	1	—		—		3	0	61	9

== Honours ==
Highlanders

- Cup of Zimbabwe: 2013
