= Oscarine Masuluke =

South African soccer player

Personal information
- Date of birth: 23 April 1993 (age 33)
- Place of birth: Pretoria, South Africa
- Height: 1.92 m (6 ft 4 in)
- Position: Goalkeeper

Team information
- Current team: Stellenbosch
- Number: 30

Senior career*
| Years | Team | Apps | (Gls) |
| 2014–2018 | Baroka | 80 | (1) |
| 2018–2020 | TS Sporting | 33 | (0) |
| 2020–2023 | Baroka | 41 | (0) |
| 2023– | Stellenbosch | 16 | (0) |
- * Club domestic league appearances and goals as of 13 February 2025

Oscarine Masuluke (born 23 April 1993) is a South African professional soccer player who plays as a goalkeeper for South African Premier Division club Stellenbosch.

On 30 November 2016, Masuluke gained attention after his last-minute bicycle kick goal earned Baroka a 1–1 draw with the Orlando Pirates. The goal was later nominated for the 2017 FIFA Puskás Award. Masuluke finished second in the voting, with Olivier Giroud elected the winner and Deyna Castellanos taking third. On 27 February 2018, he was released by Baroka following allegations that he and other teammates drank on the team bus.

He joined National First Division side TS Sporting in summer 2018. He made 33 league appearances for them before leaving in 2018.

He returned to Baroka on a three-year deal in September 2020.

On 12 July 2023, Stellenbosch announced the signing of Masuluke on a permanent transfer from Baroka FC.
