= Bonginkosi Makume =

South African soccer player

Personal information
- Date of birth: 7 November 1995 (age 31)
- Position: Defender

Team information
- Current team: Baroka

Senior career*
Years	Team	Apps	(Gls)
2018–2022	Baroka	79	(3)
2022–2023	Maritzburg United	25	(0)
2023–2024	Upington City	9	(2)
2024–	Baroka	10	(0)
- * Club domestic league appearances and goals as of 11 November 2024

Bonginkosi Makume (born 7 November 1995) is a South African soccer player who plays as a defender for South African First Division side Baroka.

Makume was named in the preliminary South Africa squad for the 2023 COSAFA Cup.
