= Gabriel Amato (footballer, born 2006) =

South African Footballer

Personal information
- Full name: Gabriel Abraham Amato
- Date of birth: 27 July 2006 (age 20)
- Place of birth: Cape Town South Africa
- Position: Midfielder

Team information
- Current team: Cape Town City
- Number: 55

Youth career
- Meadowridge F.C.
- -2021: Hellenic
- 2021–2024: Cape Town City

Senior career*
Years	Team	Apps	(Gls)
2024-	Cape Town City	26	(3)

International career
	South AfricaU-17's	4	(0)
- * Club domestic league appearances and goals

Gabriel Abraham Amato (born 27 July 2006) is a South African soccer player who plays for Cape Town City and the South Africa national soccer team's youth ranks.

== Youth career ==
Amato began his youth career at Meadowridge and later joined Hellenic F.C.. Then at the age of 15 he joined Cape Town City's youth team.

== Senior career ==
Amato was promoted to Cape Town City's first team in 2024
