= Saal =

Saal may refer to:

== Places in Germany ==
- Saal an der Donau, in the district of Kelheim, Bavaria
- Saal an der Saale, in the district Rhön-Grabfeld, Bavaria
- Saal, Mecklenburg-Vorpommern, in the district Vorpommern-Rügen, Mecklenburg-Vorpommern
- Saal Railway a 153 kilometre-long double-track main line of the German railways

== People ==
- Devon Saal (born 1992), South African footballer
- Georg Saal (1817-1870), German painter
- George Saal (1918-1996), Illinois politician and businessman
- Harry Saal, American technology entrepreneur
- Ignaz Saal (1761–1836), operatic bass and comedian
- Jason Saal (born 1975), American professional ice hockey player

== Other uses ==
- Saal Bulas syndrome listed as a "rare disease" by the Office of Rare Diseases (ORD) of the National Institutes of Health (NIH)
- Maria Saal, a market town in the district of Klagenfurt-Land in Austria
- Garthan Saal is Supernova aka Nova Omega, a fictional character in the Marvel Comics Universe
- Saal (Serengeti album), a 2013 album by alternative hip hop artist Serengeti
- Saal, a former name of the Mayan ancient city Naranjo, now in Petén Department, Guatemala

== See also ==
- Sal (disambiguation)
- Bees Saal Baad (1962 film), a Bollywood film
- Bees Saal Pehle, a 1972 Bollywood drama film
- Solva Saal, a 1958 Hindi movie
