= Roland Putsche =

Austrian footballer

- Putsche with Cape Town City in 2016

Personal information
- Full name: Roland Putsche
- Date of birth: 21 March 1991 (age 35)
- Place of birth: Klagenfurt, Austria
- Height: 1.82 m (6 ft 0 in)
- Position: Midfielder

Team information
- Current team: ATUS Velden (player-assistent)
- Number: 5

Youth career
- 1997–2001: SV Haimburg
- 2001–2005: SV Raika Griffen
- 2005–2007: FC Kärnten
- 2005–2007: FC Kärnten
- 2007–2009: Austria Kärnten

Senior career*
Years	Team	Apps	(Gls)
2009–2010	Austria Kärnten	1	(0)
2010–2016	Wolfsberger AC	118	(6)
2016–2020	Cape Town City	92	(10)
2021–	ATUS Velden		

Managerial career
- 2021–: ATUS Velden (player-assistent)
- * Club domestic league appearances and goals

Roland Putsche (born 21 March 1991) is an Austrian professional footballer who plays as a central midfielder for ATUS Velden.

== Club career ==
=== SK Austria Kärnten ===
Putsche began his professional career at SK Austria Kärnten in the Austrian Bundesliga at just 18 years old. He played in the 2009–10 season before moving to fellow Austrian side Wolfsberger AC.

=== Wolfsberger AC ===
Putsche started playing at Wolfsberger AC in the 2010–11 season - at the time they were in the Austrian Football First League. The following 2011–12 season he helped his team secure promotion to the Austrian Bundesliga. Thereafter he played with Wolfsberg in the Bundesliga for four more seasons. He was an integral part of the team, making 118 appearances and scoring 6 goals.

=== Cape Town City ===
On 20 July 2016, Putsche joined South African Premier Soccer League outfit, Cape Town City. Putsche plays as an anchor midfielder for the Cape Town side. He netted his first goal for the club in a 4–1 Telkom Knockout semi-final victory over Free State Stars. Putsche went on to win the Telkom Knockout with Cape Town City in the 2016, his first season at the club.

Putsche departed the club on 9 June 2020, returning to Europe.

=== ATUS Velden ===
In May 2021 it was confirmed, that Putsche had returned to Austrian football, signing with ATUS Velden, where he would both act as a player and assistant coach.
