= Ebrahim Seedat =

South African soccer player

Personal information
- Date of birth: 18 June 1993 (age 33)
- Place of birth: Cape Town, South Africa
- Height: 1.76 m (5 ft 9 in)
- Position: Defender

Team information
- Current team: Cape Town Spurs

Youth career
- Avendale Athletico
- ASD Cape Town

Senior career*
Years	Team	Apps	(Gls)
2011–2012	Lokeren	0	(0)
2012–2014	Bidvest Wits	11	(0)
2014	Degerfors IF	1	(0)
2015–2016	Milano United	29	(1)
2016–2020	Cape Town City	73	(0)
2020–2023	TS Galaxy	53	(2)
2024–	Cape Town Spurs	9	(0)
- * Club domestic league appearances and goals as of 4 October May 2022

Ebrahim Seedat (born 18 June 1993) is a South African soccer player who plays as a defender and midfielder for Cape Town Spurs in the National First Division.

== Early and personal life ==
Seedat hails from Athlone in Cape Town.
