= Given Mashikinya =

South African footballer

Personal information
- Full name: Given Kamogelo Mashikinya
- Date of birth: 13 April 1991 (age 35)
- Place of birth: Atteridgeville, South Africa
- Height: 1.75 m (5 ft 9 in)
- Position: Midfielder

Team information
- Current team: Baroka

Senior career*
| Years | Team | Apps | (Gls) |
| 2014–2016 | Mpumalanga Black Aces | | |
| 2016–2017 | Cape Town City | 23 | (1) |
| 2017–2021 | Bloemfontein Celtic | 87 | (1) |
| 2021–2022 | Royal AM | 21 | (0) |
| 2022 | Maritzburg United | 11 | (0) |
| 2023 | Sekhukhune United | 12 | (0) |
| 2023–2024 | Polokwane City | 26 | (2) |
| 2024– | Baroka | 3 | (0) |
- * Club domestic league appearances and goals as of 14 November 2024

Given Kamogelo Mashikinya (born 13 April 1991) is a South African professional soccer player who plays as a midfielder for National First Division side Baroka.
