= Shu-Aib Walters =

South African soccer player (born 1981)

Personal information
- Full name: Shu-Aib Walters
- Date of birth: 26 December 1981 (age 44)
- Place of birth: Cape Town, South Africa
- Height: 1.89 m (6 ft 2 in)
- Position: Goalkeeper

Youth career
- Blue Bells FC
- Milano FC
- Newtons
- Rygersdal Football Club

Senior career*
| Years | Team | Apps | (Gls) |
| –2005 | Clyde Pinelands | | |
| 2005–2006 | Vasco da Gama | | |
| 2006–2010 | Bloemfontein Celtic | 52 | (0) |
| 2010 | → Maritzburg United (loan) | 11 | (0) |
| 2010–2015 | Maritzburg United | 117 | (0) |
| 2015–2016 | Mpumalanga Black Aces | 22 | (0) |
| 2016–2018 | Cape Town City | 69 | (0) |
| 2018–2019 | Ajax Cape Town | 0 | (0) |
| Total | | 271 | (0) |
- * Club domestic league appearances and goals as of 5 March 2019

Shu-Aib Walters (born 26 December 1981) is a South African former association football player who played as a goalkeeper.

== Personal life ==
Walters, who is one of the few Muslim players in the PSL, hails from Mowbray.
