= Thabo Nodada =

South African soccer player

Personal information
- Date of birth: 2 May 1995 (age 31)
- Place of birth: Ixopo, South Africa
- Height: 1.63 m (5 ft 4 in)
- Position: Midfielder

Team information
- Current team: Durban City
- Number: 26

Senior career*
Years	Team	Apps	(Gls)
2015–2016	Mpumalanga Black Aces	16	(2)
2016–2025	Cape Town City	196	(15)
2025–	Durban City	9	(1)

International career^{‡}
2020	South Africa	2	(0)
- * Club domestic league appearances and goals as of 4 January 2026 ‡ National team caps and goals as of 27 October 2024

Thabo Nodada (born 2 May 1995) is a South African soccer player who plays as a midfielder for Durban City. He has been capped for the South Africa national team.

== Club career ==
He joined Cape Town City in 2016 when they purchased the PSL licence of his former club, Mpumalanga Black Aces.

== International career ==
He made his international debut for South Africa on 8 October 2020 in a 1–1 draw with Namibia, and also played against Zambia three days later.

== Personal life ==
Nodada was born in Ixopo. Attended high school at King Edward VII School.
