= Joseph Adjei =

Ghanaian footballer (born 1995)

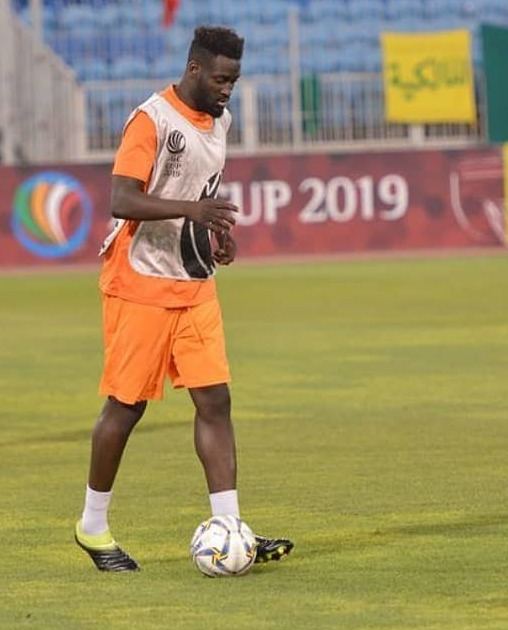
- Adjei in 2019

Personal information
- Date of birth: 20 August 1995 (age 31)
- Place of birth: Ghana
- Height: 1.89 m (6 ft 2 in)
- Position: Centre-back

Team information
- Current team: Samaleswari SC
- Number: 28

Senior career*
Years	Team	Apps	(Gls)
2015–2017	Wa All Stars	24	(3)
2016–2017	→ Cape Town City (loan)	11	(1)
2017	→ Al-Orouba (loan)	8	(0)
2018	Oklahoma City Energy	4	(0)
2018–2019	Malkiya Club	23	(0)
2019–2020	Aizawl	9	(0)
2020–2022	Legon Cities	30	(4)
2022	→ Al-Diriyah (loan)	16	(0)
2022–2023	Al-Ittihad Ahli		
2023–2025	Mohammedan	28	(1)

International career
2015	Ghana U20	4	(0)
- * Club domestic league appearances and goals

Joseph Adjei (born 20 August 1995) is a Ghanaian professional footballer who plays as a centre-back. He has also represented the Ghana national under-20 football team.

== Club career ==
Adjei began his professional football career at Wa All Stars in the First Capital Plus Premier League, Ghana's highest league. On 15 August 2016, it was announced that he had been signed on season-long loan deal by South African top-tier side Cape Town City, where he would play his first Premier Soccer League season in 2016–17.

On 17 September 2017, it was announced that he had joined with Oman-based club Al-Oruba SC on loan.

February 2018, Adjei switched teams and countries by agreeing to a contract with United Soccer League side OKC Energy FC.

Adjei signed for Malkiya Club in Bahrain on 7 October 2018.

=== Aizawl FC ===
In 2020, he joined the I-League side Aizawl FC on a one-year contract as a defender and appeared in 10 league matches as the club finished on 10th position.

=== Al-Diriyah ===
On 15 January 2022, Adjei joined Saudi First Division League side Al-Diriyah on loan.

=== Mohammedan ===
On 23 June 2023, Adjei was announced at Mohammedan.

== International career ==
In 2015, Adjei was selected to represent Ghana at the 2015 FIFA U-20 World Cup in New Zealand. Ghana finished top of their group in the tournament above Austria, Argentina, and Panama. However, the team was eventually knocked-out by African counterparts, Mali.

He has also been named in the Ghana national team latest squad for Morocco and Côte d'Ivoire friendlies.

== Honours ==
Mohammedan

- I-League: 2023–24
