= Tshepo Gumede =

South African footballer (born 1991)

Personal information
- Full name: Tshepo Gumede
- Date of birth: 21 April 1991 (age 35)
- Place of birth: Dobsonville, South Africa
- Height: 1.77 m (5 ft 10 in)
- Position: Defender

Team information
- Current team: Cape Town Spurs
- Number: 42

Youth career
- Arcadia Shepherds
- SuperSport United

Senior career*
Years	Team	Apps	(Gls)
2009–2012	SuperSport United	1	(0)
2009–2010	→ Mpumalanga Black Aces (loan)	0	(0)
2012–2015	Platinum Stars	67	(0)
2015–2016	Orlando Pirates	6	(0)
2016–2018	Cape Town City	39	(1)
2019–2020	AmaZulu	13	(0)
2021	Cape Umoya United	21	(0)
2021–2023	Marumo Gallants	32	(0)
2023–2024	Maritzburg United	17	(1)
2024–	Cape Town Spurs	10	(0)

International career^{‡}
2013–2015	South Africa	7	(0)
- * Club domestic league appearances and goals as of 15 June 2024 ‡ National team caps and goals as of 2 May 2023

Tshepo Gumede (born 21 April 1991) is a South African professional soccer player who plays for Cape Town Spurs as a defender.

== Club career ==
Gumede began his youth career at Arcadia Shepherds before joining the SuperSport United academy. He spent a season on loan at Mpumalanga Black Aces but failed to make an appearance.

Gumede joined Platinum Stars in July 2012. At the end of the 2012–13 season, he was nominated for the ABSA Premiership Young Player of the Year award and the Nedbank Cup Most Promising Player of the Tournament award, winning the former.

On 26 July 2016 it was announced that Gumede had joined Capetonian side Cape Town City. In June 2018 Gumede left the club, with the club not renewing his contract. Gumede would go on to join AmaZulu in February 2019, this after spending a period of time on trial with the club.

== International career ==
Gumede was part of the South Africa squad for the 2013 COSAFA Cup and made his debut against Namibia.

== Personal life ==
He was born in Dobsonville.
