= Reggie Jantjies =

South African soccer player

Personal information
- Position: Midfielder

Reggie Jantjies was a South African football player.

== Career ==
Jantjies played for an amateur club, Idas Valley AFC, in his native Stellenbosch, before starring for Hellenic and Cape Town Spurs in the FPL in the 1980s and 1990s.

== Death ==
Jantjies died in hospital on 12 September 2018. He had been suffering from diabetes and had had his leg amputated.
