= Luyolo Nomandela =

South African soccer player

Personal information
- Full name: Luyolo Mbiko Nomandela
- Date of birth: 3 November 1989 (age 37)
- Place of birth: Ngqeleni, South Africa
- Height: 1.75 m (5 ft 9 in)
- Position: Midfielder

Team information
- Current team: Chippa United FC

Youth career
- Mighty Eagles
- Bush Bucks

Senior career*
Years	Team	Apps	(Gls)
2011	FC Buffalo	?	(?)
2011–2012	Carara Kicks	?	(?)
2012–2014	Free State Stars	32	(5)
2014–2016	Mamelodi Sundowns	3	(0)
2015	→ Moroka Swallows (loan)	5	(1)
2016	→ Jomo Cosmos (loan)	1	(0)
2016–2017	Cape Town City	2	(0)
2017–2018	Mthatha Bucks	4	(1)
2018–2019	Tornado FC	?	(?)
2019–2021	Baberwa FC	?	(?)
2021-	Chippa United FC		

International career
2013	South Africa	2	(1)
- * Club domestic league appearances and goals as of 17 April 2019

Luyolo Nomandela (born 3 November 1989) is a South African professional soccer player who plays as a midfielder for Chippa United FC.

== Club career ==
Mayano, as he is popularly known, made his PSL debut at the beginning of the 2012/2013 season for Free State Stars F.C. from the club's feeder development side Carara Kicks F.C. Luyolo went on to become the club's prominent figure for the next few seasons due to his ball controlling ability, vision and pace, winning the club's rookie of the season award and helping the team to a top 8 finish.

At the start of the 2013/2014 season he was strongly linked with Kaizer Chiefs F.C. but the move never materialized. At the end of that season Nomandela joined Mamelodi Sundowns F.C. on a four-year deal. He made just a few off the appearances for the club under coach Pitso Mosimane, being mostly in the side's development squad in the Multichoice Diski Challenge

While still contracted to Mamelodi Sundowns F.C. he had loan spells with Moroka Swallows F.C. and Jomo Cosmos F.C. with both clubs suffering relegations one year apart, while Nomandela played for the clubs.

In October 2016 Nomandela and Mamelodi Sundowns F.C. reached an agreement to part ways with the player surfacing at Cape Town City F.C. shortly after announcement. His stint in the mother city was also a less successful one having made very few appearances off the bench under Eric Tinkler.

Before the end of the 2016/2017 PSL campaign, in April 2016 Cape Town City F.C. announced that they had parted ways with the player for undisclosed reasons.

At the beginning of the 2017/2018 NFD campaign, Nomandela was unveiled by Mthatha Bucks F.C. as part of their plan to try to return to the PSL after more than a decade of absence. It was soon reported that the player had been suspended by the club for disciplinary reasons leaving many of his supporters and admirers blaming it all on the big-money move he made to Mamelodi Sundowns F.C. in the winter transfer window of 2014 which, in the opinion of many, was the beginning of the end of his career.

On 16 January 2019, Nomandela joined Baberwa FC.

== International career ==
He made his first national team appearance under Gordon Igesund in the summer of 2013 scoring on debut against Burkina Faso.
