= Thato Mokeke =

South African soccer player

Personal information
- Date of birth: 1 April 1989 (age 37)
- Place of birth: Kimberley, South Africa
- Height: 1.76 m (5 ft 9 in)
- Position: Central defender

Team information
- Current team: Cape Town Spurs
- Number: 48

Senior career*
Years	Team	Apps	(Gls)
2009–2010	SuperSport United	0	(0)
2010	Winners Park	2	(0)
2010–2014	Ajax Cape Town	40	(0)
2014–2018	SuperSport United	39	(1)
2016–2017	→ Cape Town City (loan)	27	(0)
2018–2019	Chippa United	7	(0)
2019–2024	Cape Town City	120	(0)
2024–	Cape Town Spurs	1	(0)

International career^{‡}
2014–2019	South Africa	6	(0)
- * Club domestic league appearances and goals as of 23 April 2024 ‡ National team caps and goals as of 16 March 2024

Thato Mokeke (born 1 April 1989) is a South African professional soccer player who plays as a central defender for Cape Town Spurs.

== Career ==
Born in Cape Town, Mokeke has played club football for SuperSport United, Winners Park, Ajax Cape Town, Cape Town City and Chippa United. Mokeke was released from Cape Town City in February 2024.

He made his international debut for South Africa in 2014.
