= Pentjie Zulu =

South African soccer player

Personal information
- Full name: Pentjie Abel Zulu
- Date of birth: 25 March 1990 (age 36)
- Place of birth: QwaQwa, South Africa
- Position: Defender

Senior career*
Years	Team	Apps	(Gls)
2012–2013	Blackburn Rovers	16	(0)
2013–2016	Jomo Cosmos	71	(4)
2016	Bidvest Wits	3	(0)
2017	Chippa United	2	(0)
2017	Mthatha Bucks	14	(0)
2018	Highlands Park	1	(0)
2018–2021	Black Leopards	61	(1)
2021	Sekhukhune United	6	(0)
2021	TTM	4	(0)
2022–2023	Moroka Swallows	16	(0)
- * Club domestic league appearances and goals as of 20 September 2023

Pentjie Abel Zulu (born 25 March 1990) is a South African soccer player who played as a defender for several clubs in the Premier Soccer League.

Zulu got his breakthrough at Jomo Cosmos. He was one of the key players in 2014–15 when the team secured promotion to the first tier. Zulu subsequently made his first-tier debut in the 2015-16 South African Premier Division.

In 2016–17 he first had a stint with Bidvest Wits, then joined Chippa United in January 2017 before his contract expired yet again in the summer. After drifting between clubs, Zulu became a regular at Black Leopards, and was their most used player in 2019–20 with 29 league games. However, Zulu left Black Leopards in February 2021, for "personal reasons", and after training by himself for two months he joined then-second-tier club Sekhukhune United in April.

Yet another free transfer followed in March 2022, when Moroka Swallows acquired Zulu to avoid relegation. The short-term contract was prolonged for the 2022–23 season.
