= Thamsanqa Mkhize =

South African soccer player

Personal information
- Full name: Thamsanqa Innocent Mkhize
- Date of birth: 18 August 1988 (age 38)
- Place of birth: Durban, South Africa
- Height: 1.79 m (5 ft 10 in)
- Position: Midfielder

Team information
- Current team: Cape Town City
- Number: 2

Senior career*
Years	Team	Apps	(Gls)
2010–2013	Golden Arrows	21	(0)
2013–2016	Maritzburg United	64	(1)
2016–	Cape Town City	203	(6)

International career
2017–2019	South Africa	13	(0)
- * Club domestic league appearances and goals as of 15 June 2024

Thamsanqa Innocent Mkhize (born 18 August 1988) is a South African professional soccer player who plays for and captains Cape Town City. As well as plays for the South African national team.

== Career statistics ==
=== International ===
Appearances and goals by national team and year
National team	Year	Apps	Goals
South Africa	2017	3	0
South Africa	2018	2	0
South Africa	2019	8	0
Total		13	0
