= Thulani Hlatshwayo =

South African soccer player

Personal information
- Full name: Thulani Tyson Hlatshwayo
- Date of birth: 18 December 1989 (age 36)
- Place of birth: Soweto, South Africa
- Height: 1.89 m (6 ft 2 in)
- Position: Centre back

Team information
- Current team: Supersport United
- Number: 3

Youth career
- Senaoane Gunners FC
- 2005–2009: Ajax Cape Town

Senior career*
Years	Team	Apps	(Gls)
2009–2014	Ajax Cape Town	96	(2)
2014–2020	Bidvest Wits	140	(18)
2020–2022	Orlando Pirates	32	(0)
2022-	Supersport United	47	(1)

International career^{‡}
2005–2007	South Africa U17	3	(0)
2007–2009	South Africa U20	7	(0)
2009–2012	South Africa U23	3	(0)
2013–	South Africa	54	(4)
- * Club domestic league appearances and goals as of 1 August 2024 ‡ National team caps and goals as of 18 April 2023

Thulani Tyson Hlatshwayo (born 18 December 1989) is a South African professional soccer player who plays as a defender for Supersport United.

== Career ==
=== Ajax Cape Town ===
Hlatshwayo was born in Soweto, Gauteng. He made his professional debut for Ajax on 5 August 2009 in a 2–1 win against Orlando Pirates, in a quarter-final match of the 2009 MTN 8 tournament at the Coca Cola Park in Johannesburg. He was promoted from the club's youth academy ranks after years of good showing for both the club and the country's national youth teams.

=== Bidvest Wits ===
In the early months of 2014 it was announced that 'Tyson' as he is efficiently known has signed a pre-contract with Bidvest Wits. By doing so Hlatshwayo ended speculations that he was heading to Orlando Pirates. He joined the Johannesburg-based club in June. He has since been a force to be reckoned alongside another former Ajax CT player in Thato Mokeke. He started in Bidvest's opening league game against SuperSport United.

== International career ==
=== Youth teams ===
Hlatswayo has played for both the South Africa national under-17 and under-20 teams. He was also a member of the South African U-20 team that played in the 2009 FIFA U-20 World Cup, which lost to Ghana in a 2–1 defeat, losing to the eventual champions in the Round of 16 of the tournament.

=== Senior team ===
Hlatswayo was included in South Africa's squad for the 2015 Africa Cup of Nations and scored an own goal in the team's opening match as they lost 3–1 to Algeria. On 13 October 2018, he was one of South Africa's goalscorers as the nation recorded its largest ever victory with a 6–0 win over Seychelles in an Africa Cup of Nations qualifier.

== Career statistics ==
=== International ===
As of matches played on 12 July 2019

South Africa national team
Year	Apps	Goals
2013	6	0
2014	4	0
2015	9	1
2016	8	1
2017	4	0
2018	6	1
2019	6	0
Total	43	3

=== International goals ===
Scores and results list South Africa's goal tally first.

#	Date	Venue	Opponent	Score	Result	Competition
1.	14 January 2015	Stade Omar Bongo, Libreville	Mali	1–0	3–0	Friendly
2.	25 March 2015	Somhlolo National Stadium, Lobamba	Swaziland	1–0	3–1	Friendly
(Note: On 6 September 2017, the Emergency Bureau for the FIFA World Cup Qualifiers annulled the result of the match between Senegal and South Africa from 12 November 2016 and ordered that it be replayed. Originally South Africa had defeated Senegal 2–1. Match referee Joseph Lamptey was banned for life by the FIFA Disciplinary Committee on 20 March 2017 for "unlawfully influencing" the match after issuing a penalty for handball against Senegal.)	12 November 2016	Peter Mokaba Stadium, Polokwane, South Africa	Senegal	1–0	2–1	2018 FIFA World Cup qualification
3.	13 October 2018	FNB Stadium, Johannesburg	Seychelles	2–0	6–0	2019 Africa Cup of Nations qualification

== Honours ==
=== Club ===
Ajax Cape Town

- 2009 MTN 8: Finalist
- 2010 Telkom Knockout: Runners up

Bidvest Wits F.C

Premier Soccer League

° 2016/2017

MTN 8

° 2016

Telkom knockout

2017

Orlando Pirates F.C

MTN 8

° 2020
