= Mpho Matsi =

South African soccer player

Personal information
- Date of birth: 7 February 1990 (age 36)
- Place of birth: Mamelodi, South Africa
- Height: 1.89 m (6 ft 2 in)
- Position: Defensive midfielder

Youth career
- –2008: Arcadia Shepherds

Senior career*
Years	Team	Apps	(Gls)
2008–2015	University of Pretoria	69	(0)
2015–2015	Mpumalanga Black Aces	27	(1)
2016–	Cape Town City	69	(1)
2019	→ Maritzburg United (loan)	7	(0)
2019–2020	→ Stellenbosch (loan)	18	(0)
2020–2022	Stellenbosch	1	(0)
- * Club domestic league appearances and goals as of 4 October 2022

Mpho Matsi (born 7 February 1990 in Mamelodi) is a South African football player who last played as a defensive midfielder and midfielder for Stellenbosch in the Premier Soccer League.
