= Judas Moseamedi =

South African soccer player

Personal information
- Date of birth: 22 January 1994 (age 32)
- Place of birth: Tzaneen, South Africa
- Height: 1.90 m (6 ft 3 in)
- Position: Forward

Team information
- Current team: El Gawafel Sportives de Gafsa

Senior career*
Years	Team	Apps	(Gls)
2015–2016	Mpumalanga Black Aces	21	(4)
2016–2018	Cape Town City	36	(6)
2018–2019	Free State Stars	12	(1)
2019–2021	Maritzburg United	64	(11)
2021–2022	Stellenbosch	31	(6)
2023	Marumo Gallants	3	(0)
2023–	El Gawafel Sportives de Gafsa	0	(0)

International career^{‡}
2016–2017	South Africa	6	(2)
- * Club domestic league appearances and goals as of 2 May 2023 ‡ National team caps and goals as of 2 May 2023

Judas Moseamedi (born 22 January 1994) is a South African soccer player who plays as a forward for El Gawafel Sportives de Gafsa in the Tunisian ligue professionalle 1. He has also represented South Africa internationally.
