= Wayde Jooste =

South African soccer player

Personal information
- Date of birth: 27 September 1991 (age 35)
- Place of birth: Port Elizabeth, South Africa
- Height: 1.76 m (5 ft 9 1/2 in)
- Position: Midfielder

Team information
- Current team: AmaZulu
- Number: 26

Senior career*
Years	Team	Apps	(Gls)
2013–2016	Bloemfontein Celtic	18	(0)
2016–2019	Lamontville Golden Arrows	57	(5)
2019–2020	Highlands Park	12	(0)
2020–2022	Orlando Pirates	25	(0)
2022–2023	Maritzburg United	13	(0)
2023–	AmaZulu	22	(0)
- * Club domestic league appearances and goals as of 1 August 2024

Wayde Jooste (born 27 September 1991) is a South African soccer player who plays as a defender for South African Premier Division side AmaZulu.
