= Thokozani Sekotlong =

South African soccer player

Personal information
- Full name: Thokozani Putu Sekotlong
- Date of birth: 7 May 1991 (age 35)
- Place of birth: Mamelodi, South Africa
- Height: 1.76 m (5 ft 9 in)
- Position: Midfielder

Team information
- Current team: University of Pretoria

Senior career*
Years	Team	Apps	(Gls)
–2013	University of Pretoria	13	(12)
2013–2015	Maritzburg United	36	(6)
2016	Cape Town All Stars	14	(2)
2016–2017	Free State Stars	21	(5)
2017–2019	Mamelodi Sundowns	8	(2)
2019	→ Black Leopards (loan)	7	(0)
2020–2023	Chippa United	42	(2)
2023–	University of Pretoria	10	(1)
- * Club domestic league appearances and goals as of 1 May 2023

Thokozani Sekotlong (born 7 May 1991) is a South African professional soccer player who plays as a midfielder for South African side University of Pretoria.

== Early life ==
Sekotlong was born in Mamelodi.

== Club career ==
Sekotlong started his career at University of Pretoria, and was part of the team that reached the final of the 2008–09 Nedbank Cup, before losing to Moroka Swallows. He won promotion with the club to the South African Premier Division in 2012. He rejected offers from Kaizer Chiefs and Platinum Stars that summer, and played 13 times for AmaTuks in the league across the 2012–13 season. He was released bu AmaTuks in 2013, and subsequently joined Maritzburg United. He appeared in 36 league matches, scoring 6 goals, over a two-year spell with the club, before being released in the summer of 2015.

After a spell with National First Division side Cape Town All Stars in the latter half of the 2015–16 season, he joined Free State Stars in the summer of 2016. He left the club at the end of the season.

He joined Mamelodi Sundowns in the summer of 2017. He scored his first goal for the club on 21 October 2017 in a 2–1 defeat at home to AmaZulu. He joined Black Leopards on loan in January 2019. He left Sundowns at the end of the 2018–19 season.

Having been without a club since his release from Mamelodi Sundowns at the end of the previous season, he joined Chippa United in January 2020. He scored his first goal for the club on 28 August 2020: a late equaliser in a 1–1 draw with Stellenbosch.

== International career ==
Sekotlong was called up to the South Africa under-23 squad in 2011.
