= Wayne Arendse =

South African soccer player

Personal information
- Full name: Wayne Earl Arendse
- Date of birth: 25 November 1984 (age 41)
- Place of birth: Cape Town, South Africa
- Height: 1.90 m (6 ft 3 in)
- Position: Central defender

Youth career
- Kenpark United
- Engen Santos

Senior career*
Years	Team	Apps	(Gls)
2006–2012	Engen Santos	162	(3)
2012–2020	Mamelodi Sundowns	106	(5)

International career
2012	South Africa	1	(0)
- * Club domestic league appearances and goals

Wayne Earl Arendse (born 25 November 1984) is a South African retired soccer defender. He played for Engen Santos for six years before joining Mamelodi Sundowns in July 2012.

He hails from Mitchell's Plain on the Cape Flats.

== International career ==
He made his debut for South Africa in 2012 and was capped once.
