= Devon Saal =

South African soccer player

Personal information
- Full name: Devon Daniel Saal
- Date of birth: 6 June 1992 (age 34)
- Place of birth: Cape Town, South Africa
- Positions: Forward; winger

Team information
- Current team: Richards Bay

Youth career
- ASD Cape Town
- Cape Town All Stars
- ASD Cape Town

Senior career*
| Years | Team | Apps | (Gls) |
| 2012–2014 | Milano United | 53 | (15) |
| 2014–2016 | Santos | 23 | (4) |
| 2016–2018 | Maritzburg United | 20 | (2) |
| 2018 | → Stellenbosch (loan) | 8 | (2) |
| 2018–2019 | Ubuntu Cape Town | 17 | (3) |
| 2019– | Richards Bay | 3 | (3) |
- * Club domestic league appearances and goals as of 19:55, 18 September 2019 (UTC)

Devon Saal (born 6 June 1992) is a South African soccer player who plays professionally for Richards Bay as a winger or forward.

== Personal ==
Saal hails from Mitchells Plain on the Cape Flats.
