= 2016–17 South African Premiership =

South African Premiership
- Season: 2016–17
- Champions: Bidvest Wits (1st title)
- Champions League: Bidvest Wits; Mamelodi Sundowns
- Confederation Cup: Cape Town City; SuperSport United
- Matches: 224
- Goals: 509 (2.27 per match)
- Top goalscorer: Lebogang Manyama (13)
- Biggest home win: Mamelodi Sundowns 6–0 Orlando Pirates (11 February 2017)
- Biggest away win: Cape Town City 0–4 Platinum Stars (13 December 2016)
- Highest scoring: 2 matches: SuperSport United 6–1 Orlando Pirates (1 November 2016); SuperSport United 5–2 Golden Arrows (8 February 2017)
- Longest winning run: Bidvest Wits; Kaizer Chiefs; Mamelodi Sundowns (5)
- Longest unbeaten run: SuperSport United (19)
- Longest winless run: Baroka (15)
- Longest losing run: Chippa United (5)
- Average attendance: 5,124
- All statistics correct as of 13 May 2017.

The 2016–17 South African Premiership season (known as the ABSA Premiership for sponsorship reasons) is the 21st season of the Premiership since its establishment in 1996.

Mamelodi Sundowns were the defending champions, having won the previous 2015–16 South African Premier Division (PSL) season. The season featured 14 teams from the 2015–16 season and two new teams promoted from the 2015–16 National First Division: Baroka and Highlands Park who replace relegated Jomo Cosmos and University of Pretoria. Highlands Park promotion was won via the PSL Playoff Tournament. Cape Town City bought over the franchise of Mpumalanga Black Aces and relocated from Mbombela Stadium to Cape Town Stadium. The sale of Free State Stars franchise to Moroka Swallows fell through.

== Teams ==
=== Stadiums and locations ===
Location of teams in the 2016–17 PSL.
Gauteng PSL football clubs

Football teams in South Africa tend to use multiple stadiums over the course of a season for their home games. The following table will only indicate the stadium used most often by the club for their home games.

Team	Location	Stadium	Capacity
Ajax Cape Town	Cape Town	Cape Town Stadium	55,000
Baroka	Polokwane	Peter Mokaba Stadium	45,500
Bidvest Wits	Johannesburg	Bidvest Stadium	5,000
Bloemfontein Celtic	Bloemfontein	Dr Petrus Molemela Stadium	22,000
Cape Town City	Cape Town	Cape Town Stadium	55,000
Chippa United	Port Elizabeth	Nelson Mandela Bay Stadium	46,000
Free State Stars	Phuthaditjhaba	Charles Mopeli Stadium	35,000
Highlands Park	Tembisa	Makhulong Stadium	10,000
Lamontville Golden Arrows	Durban	Princess Magogo Stadium	12,000
Kaizer Chiefs	Soweto	FNB Stadium (Soccer City)	94,736
Mamelodi Sundowns	Pretoria	Lucas Masterpieces Moripe Stadium	28,900
Maritzburg United	Pietermaritzburg	Harry Gwala Stadium	12,000
Orlando Pirates	Soweto	Orlando Stadium	40,000
Platinum Stars	Phokeng	Royal Bafokeng Stadium	44,530
Polokwane City	Polokwane	Peter Mokaba Stadium	45,500
SuperSport United	Pretoria	Lucas Masterpieces Moripe Stadium	28,900

=== Personnel and kits ===
Team	Manager	Kit manufacturer	Shirt sponsor
Ajax Cape Town	(Netherlands) Stanley Menzo	Adidas	Huawei
Baroka	(South Africa) Kgoloko Thobejane	Umbro	Clover
BV Wits	(South Africa) Gavin Hunt	Kappa	Bidvest
Bloemfontein Celtic	(South Africa) Vacant	Kappa	MTN
Cape Town City	(South Africa) Eric Tinkler	Umbro	Vacant
Chippa United	(South Africa) Dan Masilela	Canterbury	Chippa Holdings
Free State Stars	(France) Denis Lavagne	Umbro	Bonitas
Highlands Park	(South Africa) Gordon Igesund	Kappa	Highfield Motor Group
Golden Arrows	(South Africa) Clinton Larsen	Millé	Vacant
Kaizer Chiefs	(South Africa) Steve Komphela	Nike	Vodacom
Mamelodi Sundowns	(South Africa) Pitso Mosimane	Puma	Ubuntu Botho
Maritzburg United	(Germany) Ernst Middendorp	Puma	Vacant
Orlando Pirates	(Sweden) Kjell Jonevret	Adidas	Vodacom
Platinum Stars	(South Africa) Cavin Johnson	Acelli	The Royal Marang Hotel
Polokwane City	(Belgium) Luc Eymael	XCO	Vacant
SuperSport United	(England) Stuart Baxter	Kappa	Engen

=== Managerial changes ===
Team	Outgoing manager	Manner of departure	Date of vacancy	Position in table	Incoming manager	Date of appointment
Free State Stars	(France) Denis Lavagne	Sacked	22 September 2016	16		

== League table ==
=== Standings ===
Pos	Team	Pld	W	D	L	GF	GA	GD	Pts	Qualification or relegation
1	Bidvest Wits (C)	30	18	6	6	47	22	+25	60	Qualification for 2018 CAF Champions League
2	Mamelodi Sundowns	30	16	9	5	52	20	+32	57	Qualification for 2018 CAF Champions League
3	Cape Town City	30	16	7	7	47	35	+12	55	Qualification for 2018 CAF Confederation Cup
4	Kaizer Chiefs	30	13	11	6	39	28	+11	50	
5	SuperSport United	30	12	12	6	42	29	+13	48	
6	Polokwane City	30	10	13	7	36	34	+2	43	
7	Maritzburg United	30	9	11	10	31	35	−4	38	
8	Golden Arrows	30	10	8	12	32	44	−12	38	
9	Platinum Stars	30	9	10	11	33	32	+1	37	
10	Ajax Cape Town	30	9	9	12	29	35	−6	36	
11	Orlando Pirates	30	6	15	9	29	40	−11	33	
12	Bloemfontein Celtic	30	5	14	11	16	28	−12	29	
13	Chippa United	30	6	10	14	27	32	−5	28	
14	Free State Stars	30	6	10	14	26	37	−11	28	
15	Baroka (O)	30	5	13	12	26	43	−17	28	Qualification for the relegation play-offs
16	Highlands Park (R)	30	5	12	13	26	44	−18	27	Relegation to 2017–18 National First Division

Updated to match(es) played on 13 May 2017. Source: Soccerway
Rules for classification: 1) points; 2) goal difference; 3) goals scored; 4) head-to-head points; 5) head-to-head goal difference; 6) head-to-head goals scored; 7) playoff
(C) Champions; (O) Play-off winners; (R) Relegated

=== Positions by round ===
Leader
2017 CAF Champions League or 2017 CAF Confederation Cup
Relegation to National First Division or Playoff Tournament

Team ╲ Round	1	2	3	4	5	6	7	8	9	10	11	12	13	14	15	16	17	18	19	20	21	22	23	24	25	26	27	28	29	30
Bidvest Wits	3	2	2	3	7	8	3	1	1	1	3	3	3	2	2	2	1	1	3	2	2	2	2	2	1	1	1	1	1	
Mamelodi Sundowns	9	9	13	15	15	16	16	15	12	8	8	8	9	9	7	5	5	5	5	5	5	5	4	4	2	2	2	2	2	
Cape Town City	2	8	7	5	4	6	5	5	3	2	1	1	1	1	3	3	2	4	2	1	1	1	1	1	3	3	3	3	3	
SuperSport United	13	14	8	6	8	4	4	2	4	3	2	2	2	3	1	1	4	3	1	3	3	4	5	5	5	5	5	4	4	
Kaizer Chiefs	11	12	6	4	1	1	1	3	5	5	5	7	6	6	4	4	3	2	4	4	4	3	3	3	4	4	4	5	5	
Polokwane City	16	16	12	7	5	5	7	6	7	7	7	4	4	4	5	6	6	6	6	7	6	7	7	6	6	6	6	6	6	
Maritzburg United	5	5	8	11	11	11	11	11	8	9	9	9	8	8	8	7	9	9	8	8	9	8	8	8	7	7	7	7	7	
Ajax Cape Town	7	10	11	13	13	15	15	16	16	15	14	11	13	11	9	11	11	11	11	12	12	13	11	10	11	10	8	8	8	
Golden Arrows	15	7	3	1	2	2	2	4	2	4	4	6	5	5	6	8	7	7	7	6	7	6	6	7	8	9	9	9	9	
Platinum Stars	5	2	4	9	9	10	10	9	11	12	13	14	11	12	13	12	12	14	12	9	8	9	10	11	10	11	11	11	10	
Orlando Pirates	1	1	1	2	3	3	6	6	6	6	6	5	7	7	10	10	10	10	10	10	10	11	9	9	9	8	10	10	11	
Bloemfontein Celtic	13	14	14	16	16	12	12	13	13	13	12	13	12	13	12	13	13	12	13	13	14	12	13	13	13	12	12	12	12	
Chippa United	3	2	4	8	6	7	8	8	10	11	11	10	10	10	11	9	8	8	9	11	11	10	12	12	12	13	13	15	13	
Free State Stars	11	13	15	14	14	14	14	14	15	16	15	15	15	16	14	14	14	13	14	14	15	14	14	14	14	14	14	13	14	
Highlands Park	9	6	10	12	10	13	13	12	14	14	16	16	14	15	15	15	15	15	15	15	13	15	16	15	15	16	16	14	15	
Baroka	7	10	16	10	12	9	9	10	9	10	10	12	16	14	16	16	16	16	16	16	16	16	15	16	16	15	15	16	16	

Updated to match(es) played on 13 May 2017. Source: Soccerway

=== Results ===
Home \ Away	AJX	BRK	BVW	BLC	CTC	CHU	FSS	GOL	HPK	KZC	MLS	MAR	ORL	PLA	PLK	SUP
Ajax Cape Town		0–1	1–2	2–0	0–2	1–0	2–2	1–0	1–0	1–1	2–0	1–2	1–2	2–0	1–1	0–2
Baroka	1–1		0–2	1–1	0–3	1–4	2–1	1–1	0–0	2–2	0–1	0–1	1–1	0–0	2–2	1–1
Bidvest Wits	5–0	5–0		3–1	2–3	1–0	3–1	3–0	2–2	2–1	1–0	1–0	1–0	2–0	2–0	0–1
Bloemfontein Celtic	0–3	2–1	1–2		0–0	2–0	0–0	1–2	1–1	0–2	0–1	0–1	0–0	0–3	0–0	0–0
Cape Town City	1–0	1–2	1–1	1–0		4–1	1–0	1–0	3–0	3–2	1–0	3–2	2–2	0–4	2–0	1–1
Chippa United	0–1	2–1	0–0	0–0	1–2		2–1	2–2	2–0	3–1	1–1	2–3	0–1	1–1	0–0	3–0
Free State Stars	1–1	1–0	3–1	0–0	1–0	0–0		0–1	0–1	0–2	0–1	1–1	3–2	3–1	1–2	0–0
Golden Arrows	1–1	3–2	0–0	2–1	2–0	1–0	0–1		2–1	0–2	0–2	1–0	2–1	0–1	3–3	1–1
Highlands Park	2–1	2–1	0–2	1–1	1–1	1–0	2–2	0–1		0–1	2–2	1–0	0–0	2–2	1–1	0–1
Kaizer Chiefs	2–0	0–0	1–0	0–0	1–1	1–0	3–1	1–1	1–0		2–1	2–0	1–1	1–1	3–2	1–1
Mamelodi Sundowns	2–0	2–2	2–0	0–0	1–2	0–0	4–1	3–0	5–0	2–1		2–2	6–0	2–2	0–0	5–0
Maritzburg United	2–1	3–1	1–1	1–1	1–0	1–1	2–1	2–2	1–1	1–2	0–0		2–1	0–0	0–1	0–1
Orlando Pirates	0–0	1–1	1–2	1–2	0–0	2–1	1–0	3–1	2–2	0–0	0–2	2–0		1–1	1–1	1–1
Platinum Stars	2–3	0–1	0–1	0–1	2–4	2–1	1–1	2–0	1–0	2–0	1–2	0–0	0–0		2–3	1–0
Polokwane City	1–1	0–0	0–0	0–1	4–2	1–0	1–0	3–1	3–2	1–0	0–2	1–1	1–1	1–0		2–3
SuperSport United	0–0	0–1	2–0	0–0	4–2	0–0	0–0	5–2	4–1	2–2	0–1	4–1	6–1	0–1	2–1	

Updated to match(es) played on 13 May 2017. Source: Soccerway
Legend: Blue = home team win; Yellow = draw; Red = away team win.

== Season statistics ==
=== Scoring ===
==== Top scorers ====
As of 13 May 2017

Rank	Player	Club	Goals
1	(South Africa) Lebogang Manyama	Cape Town City	13
2	(Zimbabwe) Tendai Ndoro	Orlando Pirates	12
3	(Malawi) Gabadinho Mhango	BV Wits	9
3	(South Africa) Rodney Ramagalela	Polokwane	9
5	(Zimbabwe) Khama Billiat	Mamelodi	8
5	(New Zealand) Jeremy Brockie	SuperSport Utd	8
7	(South Africa) Thuso Phala	SuperSport Utd	7
7	(South Africa) Percy Tau	Mamelodi	7
7	(South Africa) Siphiwe Tshabalala	Kaizer Chiefs	7
7	(South Africa) Themba Zwane	Mamelodi	7

==== Hat-tricks ====
Player	For	Against	Result	Date
(Zimbabwe) Tendai Ndoro	Orlando Pirates	Golden Arrows	3–1	24 August 2016
(South Africa) Bhongolwethu Jayiya	Cape Town City	Chippa United	4–1	3 April 2017

== Attendances ==
#	Football club	Average attendance
1	Kaizer Chiefs	13,686
2	Orlando Pirates	10,533
3	Mamelodi Sundowns	7,600
4	Chippa United	7,276
5	Bloemfontein Celtic	6,266
6	Ajax Cape Town	5,220
7	Maritzburg United	4,443
8	Cape Town City	4,380
9	Baroka	4,190
10	SuperSport United	3,166
11	Free State Stars	3,098
12	Highlands Park	2,913
13	Golden Arrows	2,702
14	Polokwane City	2,280
15	Bidvest Wits	1,873
16	Platinum Stars	1,614
