= Lehlohonolo Majoro =

South African soccer player

Personal information
- Full name: Lehlohonolo Coreyo Michael Majoro
- Date of birth: 19 August 1986 (age 40)
- Place of birth: Ladybrand, South Africa
- Height: 1.76 m (5 ft 9 1/2 in)
- Position: Forward

Youth career
- Mubs FC
- Kovsies FC
- 2005–2006: Manyatseng United Brothers
- 2006–2007: University of the Free State
- 2007–2008: Bloemfontein Young Tigers
- 2008–2009: University of Johannesburg
- 2009–2010: Highlands Park

Senior career*
Years	Team	Apps	(Gls)
2010–2011	AmaZulu	29	(14)
2011–2013	Kaizer Chiefs	59	(19)
2013–2016	Orlando Pirates	46	(9)
2016–2017	Cape Town City	31	(9)
2018–2019	Bidvest Wits	33	(8)
2019–2023	AmaZulu	84	(46)

International career^{‡}
2011–2015	South Africa	12	(2)
- * Club domestic league appearances and goals as of 23 October 2022 ‡ National team caps and goals as of 23 October 2022

Lehlohonolo Majoro (born 19 August 1986) is a South African former soccer player who played as a forward for several Premier Soccer League sides and the South African national team.

== Club career ==
=== Kaizer Chiefs ===
He made his unofficial debut in a Vodacom Challenge in a 1–0 win over Tottenham Hotspur. He made his league debut for Chiefs on 18 August 2011 in a 2–1 win over Jomo Cosmos. He also scored on debut only after 2 minutes after an accurate pass from Bernard Parker. He went on to be the club's top goalscorer with 10 goals.

He left AmaZulu after the 2022–23 season at the age of 36.

== International career ==
He made his debut for South Africa on 14 May 2011 versus Tanzania in an international friendly.

=== International goals ===
Scores and results list South Africa's goal tally first.

#	Date	Venue	Opponent	Score	Result	Competition
1.	22 December 2012	Durban, South Africa	Malawi	1–0	3–1	Friendly
2.	23 January 2013	Durban, South Africa	Angola	2–0	2–0	2013 Africa Cup of Nations
