= Aubrey Ngoma =

South African soccer player

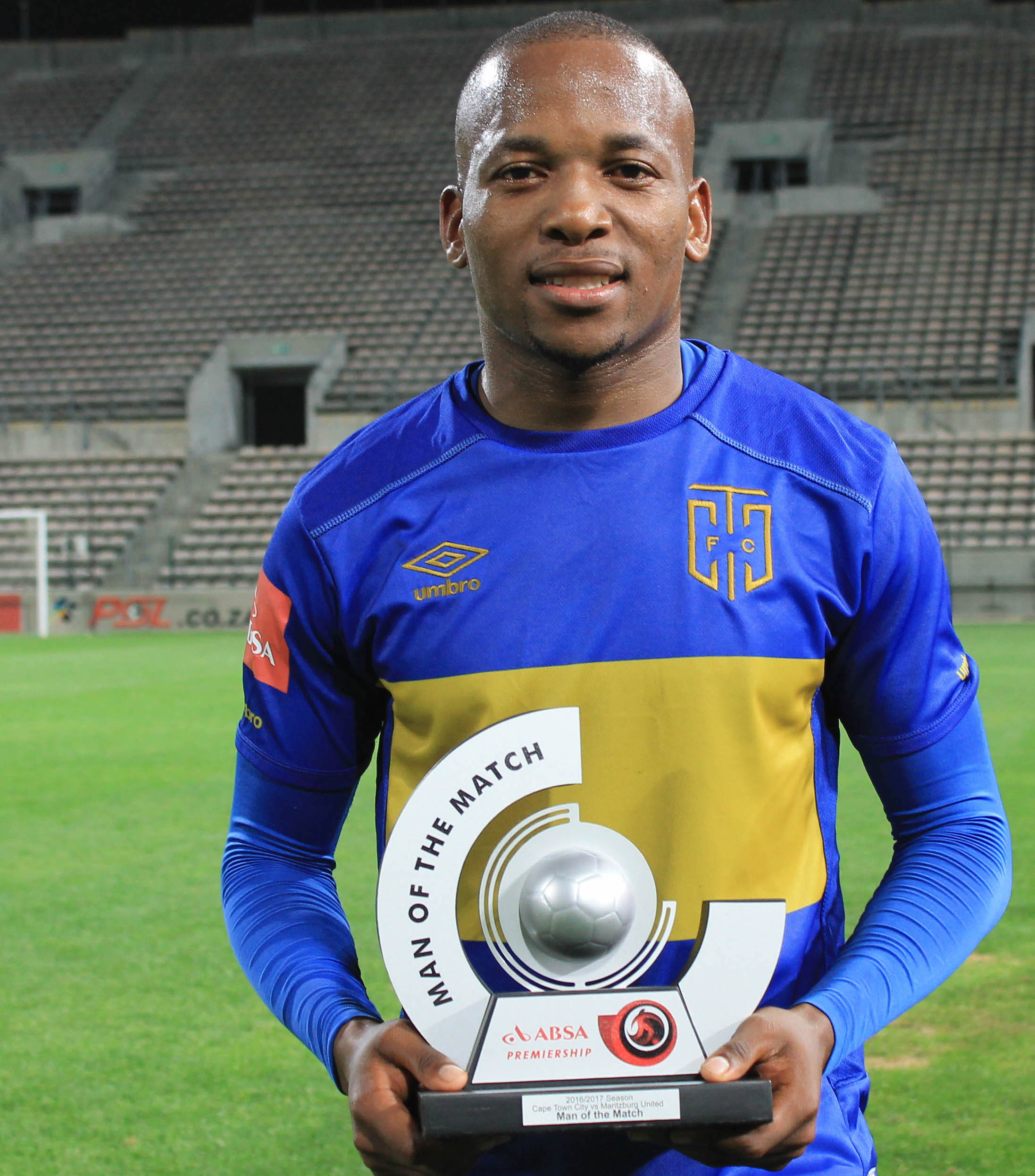

Personal information
- Full name: Aubrey Bongani Ngoma
- Date of birth: 16 September 1989 (age 37)
- Place of birth: Hammanskraal, South Africa
- Height: 1.67 m (5 ft 6 in)
- Position: Winger

Youth career
- Bolton Wanderers
- University of Pretoria

Senior career*
Years	Team	Apps	(Gls)
2008–2012	University of Pretoria		
2012–2015	Orlando Pirates	10	(0)
2012–2014	University of Pretoria (loan)	27	(6)
2014–2016	Mpumalanga Black Aces	43	(8)
2016–2017	Cape Town City	86	(12)
2018–2022	Mamelodi Sundowns	9	(0)
2021	→ Cape Town City (loan)	11	(1)
2022–2023	SuperSport United	25	(1)

International career^{‡}
2017	South Africa	1	(0)
- * Club domestic league appearances and goals as of 16 November 2023 ‡ National team caps and goals as of 6 October 2022

Abrey Bongani "Aubrey" Ngoma (born 16 September 1989) is a South African football player who played as a winger in the Premier Soccer League.

He is a former Orlando Pirates and University of Pretoria player.
