= Daine Klate =

South African football player

Personal information
- Full name: Daine Marcelle Klate
- Date of birth: 25 February 1985 (age 41)
- Place of birth: Port Elizabeth, South Africa
- Height: 1.69 m (5 ft 7 in)
- Position: Left winger

Youth career
- –2000: Glenville Celtic
- 2000–2002: Transnet School of Excellence
- 2002–2004: Supersport United

Senior career*
Years	Team	Apps	(Gls)
2004–2010	Supersport United	101	(24)
2010–2015	Orlando Pirates	87	(7)
2015	→ Supersport United (loan)	6	(1)
2015–2018	Bidvest Wits	72	(10)
2018–2019	Chippa United	14	(0)

International career
2005–2013	South Africa	13	(1)
- * Club domestic league appearances and goals

Daine Klate (born 25 January 1985) is a retired South African football midfielder born in Port Elizabeth, Eastern Cape.

== Early life ==
Klate was raised in Gelvandale, a former coloured township in Port Elizabeth. He started playing football for his primary school in Gelvandale at the age of eight and continued with the sport in high school.

== Playing career ==
=== Club ===
Like fellow South African international Elrio Van Heerden, Klate played for the Port Elizabeth-based amateur football club Glenville Celtic as a kid. At age 15, he moved to Gauteng to play for the Transnet School of Excellence. In 2002, he joined the Supersport United Feyenoord youth academy.

After being promoted to the club's first team as a 19-year-old in 2004, Klate owned the left-wing position at Supersport and made over 100 league appearances for the club. He was one of the key players of United's back-to-back Premiership wins in 2008, 2009 and 2010.

In 2010, he signed with the Orlando Pirates.

2010-11 season

Since Klate joined Pirates at the beginning of the 2010–11 season, some Pirates supporters believed him to have been the lucky charm that won the team trophies. In his first Knockout competition, the Pirates won the MTN 8 Cup via penalty shoot-outs in Durban against the Moroka Swallows. It was the first domestic trophy for Orlando Pirates since 2003. Since then, Orlando Pirates went on to win the treble that season, picking up the Nedbank Cup (defeating the Black Leopards 3–1 at the Mbombela Stadium) and the Pirates' third Premier Soccer League title. The previous league title for Orlando Pirates was in 2003. In this season, Orlando Pirates played all available official games in the season and lost the Telkom Knockout in the final against Kaizer Chiefs. Orlando Pirates also played all the finals that season. This title was the fourth in a row for Klate who had won three consecutively with his former team, Supersport United F.C.

2011-12 season

Klate and his teammates defended the MTN 8 Trophy by beating the Kaizer Chiefs 1–0 at the FNB Stadium via an Oupa Manyisa long-range effort in extra-time. Orlando Pirates won their first-ever Telkom Knockout Trophy against Wits 3–1, finished the season by successfully defending the league title, and won the second successive treble. This league title was Klate's fifth title in a row and made him the first player ever to win the league title in five consecutive seasons.

Klate joined legends Andre Arendse and the late Ace Ntsoelengoe as the only players to win the league title five times. The record is held by former Bafana Bafana captain Neil Tovey, who has won it six times.

Loan to SuperSport United F.C.

In 2015 Klate returned to SuperSport United after several meetings between his agent and Irvin Khoza. SuperSport United officially announced the signing of Klate from the Orlando Pirates. The Tshwane outfit announced the news on their official Twitter account.

== International career ==
He made his national team debut in the CONCACAF Gold Cup quarterfinal against Panama on 16 July 2005 and has so far been capped ten times scoring one goal.

== Career statistics ==
=== International goals ===
#	Date	Venue	Opponent	Score	Result	Competition
1	2008-10-01	Germiston, South Africa	Malawi	3–0	3–0	Friendly match

== Playing honours ==
=== Club ===
- Supersport United F.C.
  - Premier Soccer League 2007–08, 2008–09, 2009–10
  - ABSA Cup 2005
  - SAA Supa 8 2004
- Orlando Pirates F.C.
  - Premier Soccer League 2010–11, 2011–12
  - MTN 8 2010, 2011
  - Telkom Knockout 2011
  - Nedbank Cup 2011,2014
- Bidvest Wits
  - MTN 8 2016
  - Premier Soccer League 2016–17

== Managerial career ==
He was appointed head coach of La Masia in October 2023.
