= Bhongolwethu Jayiya =

South African soccer player

Personal information
- Full name: Bhongolwethu Lonwabo Jayiya
- Date of birth: 21 March 1990 (age 36)
- Place of birth: Soweto, South Africa
- Position: Winger

Youth career
- Super Spurs
- 2009–2011: Bidvest Wits

Senior career*
Years	Team	Apps	(Gls)
2011–2014	Bidvest Wits	46	(11)
2014	Maritzburg United	14	(4)
2014–2016	Mpumalanga Black Aces	34	(4)
2016–2017	Cape Town City	21	(6)
2017–2019	Kaizer Chiefs	15	(0)
- * Club domestic league appearances and goals as of 15:32, 28 October 2019 (UTC)

Bhongolwethu Jayiya (born 21 March 1990) is a South African football (soccer) player who plays as a winger. Jayiya was educated at Potchefstroom High School for Boys which over the years has produced numerous internationally acclaimed sportsmen.
