= Lebogang Manyama =

South African retired soccer player

Personal information
- Date of birth: 13 September 1990 (age 36)
- Place of birth: Tembisa, South Africa
- Height: 1.81 m (5 ft 11 in)
- Position: Midfielder

Youth career
- Balfour Park
- Alexandra FC

Senior career*
Years	Team	Apps	(Gls)
2010–2013	Ajax Cape Town	91	(16)
2013–2016	SuperSport United	29	(6)
2015–2016	→ Mpumalanga Black Aces (loan)	14	(3)
2016–2017	Cape Town City	37	(14)
2017–2018	Konyaspor	10	(2)
2018–2022	Kaizer Chiefs	95	(15)

International career^{‡}
2013–2022	South Africa	17	(1)
- * Club domestic league appearances and goals as of 12 July 2023 (UTC) ‡ National team caps and goals as of 27 May 2018

Lebogang Manyama (born 13 September 1990), nicknamed “Kaka” is a retired South African professional soccer player who is the assistant coach of Cape Town City F.C.

== Early life ==
Manyama was born in Tembisa but grew up in Alexandra, north of Johannesburg. He attended Northview High School.

== Club career ==
=== Ajax Cape Town ===
Lebogang Manyama made his professional debut for Ajax Cape Town on 20 August 2010 against Mamelodi Sundowns, winning (4–3) on penalties after a 1–1 draw, in a quarterfinal match of the 2010 MTN 8 tournament at Athlone Stadium in Cape Town. He was acquired by Ajax Cape Town in the summer of 2010 as a transfer from FC Alexandra. During his time at Ajax he was a stand out player in the South African Premier League and was subsequently acquired by Supersport United.

=== SuperSport United ===
He went on to play for Supersport United who later on loaned him to Mpumalanga Black Aces for the 2015/16 season. He had a good season however his season came to an end after he suffered an injury during the latter stages of the season.

=== Cape Town City FC ===
In 2016, Lebo was signed by Cape Town City F.C. and was subsequently named Captain for the team's inaugural 2016/17 Premier Soccer League campaign. He made history in the club's opening PSL season by guiding them to the prestigious Telkom Knockout Cup trophy, in a 2-1 victory over Supersport United. In this season he was the League's top goalscorer and named South African player of the year. His role at Cape Town City has seen him cement his place in the national team and is regarded currently as the best player in South Africa.

=== Kaizer Chiefs ===
After a short spell with the Turkish side Konyaspor, Manyama signed for Kaizer Chiefs He went on to lead the Glamour boys' forward line alongside ex-Sundowns duo of Khama Billiat and Leanardo Castro alongside Serbian marksman Samir Nukovic to help Chiefs finish second to Sundowns and subsequently qualify for the CAF Champions League.

== International career ==
Manyama has made 11 appearances for the South African National Team netting 1 goal. He is mostly used as an attacking midfielder or false-nine in the national team as he interchanges comfortably between a midfield or striking role. He made his Bafana Bafana debut in 2013 and continues to be selected, with the most recent call-ups in June 2017 for the AFCON qualifier against Nigeria and the international friendly against Zambia.

=== International goals ===
Scores and results list South Africa's goal tally first.

No	Date	Venue	Opponent	Score	Result	Competition
1.	13 June 2017	Moruleng Stadium, Saulspoort, South Africa	Zambia	1–0	1–0	Friendly

== Early Retirement ==
In June 2023, Manyama announced his retirement at 32. A persistent knee injury had cut short his career. Having been sidelined since March 2022, Manyama parted ways with Chiefs last year, and despite nearing a return to his former club Cape Town City, he remained without a team. The inability to recover from a knee ailment has now been confirmed as a consequence of a misdiagnosis, leading to a conclusion to Manyama's football playing career.

== Honours ==
=== Club ===
Cape Town City FC

- 2016 Telkom Knockout: Winner
- 2016–17 South African Premier Division: Player of the month - October, November, December, February

Supersport United

- 2014 Telkom Knockout: Winner
