= Baroka F.C. =

Baroka
- Full name: Baroka Football Club
- Nickname: Bakgakga
- Founded: 30 December 2007; 18 years ago
- Ground: Global Stadium
- Chairman: Khurishi Mphahlele
- League: First Division
- 2025–26: 16th
Home colours	Away colours	Third colours

Baroka F.C. is a South African football club from Ga-Mphahlele near Polokwane, Limpopo that plays in the National First Division.

== History ==
Baroka won the Limpopo Stream of the SAFA Second Division three years in succession, failing to earn promotion in the national playoffs twice before earning promotion to the National First Division at the third attempt. In their debut season in the National First Division Baroka came close to qualifying for the promotion play-offs to the Premiership, but fell short on goal difference on the last day with a 1–1 draw against Thanda Royal Zulu.

While still in the third tier, the club received national attention by reaching the semi-final of the 2010–11 Nedbank Cup, defeating several Premiership sides including Moroka Swallows and Kaizer Chiefs along the way.

The club won its first major title in 2018, defeating Mamelodi Sundowns and Orlando Pirates en route to the 2018 title.

In December 2023, the club experienced financial difficulties, only paying half of its player salaries.

Baroka was relegated from the 2025–26 National First Division, finishing bottom of the table in 16th place. In May 2026, following the club's relegation, players refused to train due to unpaid April salaries, and threatened to boycott their final league game.

== Home ground ==
Prior to 2022, the club played at the Old Peter Mokaba Stadium. From 2022, Baroka play at the Global Stadium.

== Achievements ==
- 2015–16 National First Division champions.
- 2010–11 Nedbank Cup semi-finalists
- Telkom Knockout
  - Winners: 2018
- SAFA Second Division
  - Limpopo Stream winners: 2010–11, 2011–12, 2012–13
  - Champions: 2012–13

== League record ==
=== SAFA Second Division Limpopo Stream ===
- 2009–10 – 5th
- 2010–11 – 1st
- 2011–12 – 1st
- 2012–13 – 1st (promoted)

=== National First Division ===
- 2013–14 – 4th
- 2014–15 – 9th
- 2015–16 – 1st (promoted)

=== Premiership ===
- 2016–17 – 15th
- 2017–18 – 14th
- 2018–19 – 14th
- 2019–20 – 14th
- 2020–21 – 10th
- 2021–22 – 16th (relegated)

=== National First Division ===
- 2022–23 – 9th
- 2023–24 – 3rd
- 2024–25 – 8th
- 2025–26 – 16th (relegated)
