= Cape Town City F.C. (2016) =

South African professional football club

Cape Town City
- Full name: Cape Town City Football Club
- Nicknames: The Citizens; Blue and Gold Army
- Short name: Cape Town City
- Founded: 2016; 10 years ago
- Ground: Athlone Stadium
- Capacity: 34,000
- Coordinates: 33°54′12.46″S 18°24′40.15″E
- Owner(s): Michel Comitis, John Comitis
- Head coach: Andries Ulderink
- League: National First Division
- 2025–26: 2nd
- Website: www.capetowncityfc.co.za
Home colours	Away colours	Third colours

Cape Town City Football Club (Afrikaans: Kaapstad Sokkerklub) is a South African professional football club based in Cape Town, South Africa, that plays in the National First Division (NFD). It was founded in 2016. A previous club under the same name was founded in 1960, before dissolving in 1977. Following the club's relegation to the NFD, the team plays its home matches at the Athlone Stadium.

== History ==
Cape Town City FC was resurrected when South African businessman and former professional soccer player John Comitis purchased the franchise rights of defunct Mpumalanga Black Aces F.C. Comitis was one of two co-founders of Ajax Cape Town F.C. in 1999 but eventually sold his shares in 2013. In 2016, Comitis bought defunct Black Aces, located in Nelspruit, Mpumalanga, and relocated the team with the franchise license in Cape Town.

The club finished 15th in the 2024–25 Premiership, entering the playoffs, and was relegated to the 2025–26 National First Division.

== Stadium ==
Following its relegation to the National First Division, the club plays its home games at the Athlone Stadium. Previously, it played at the Cape Town Stadium. In 2018, the club announced that it would begin using Hartleyvale Stadium, the previous club's original home ground between 1962 and 1977, as a training facility but continue home matches at Cape Town Stadium.

In January 2025, prior to its relegation, the club intended to build a 10,000 seater stadium at Hartleyvale, with construction starting by 2026.

== Rivalries ==
Cape Town is a city with many football clubs and so there are many smaller derbies. Fixtures against Cape Town Spurs (dubbed the iKapa Derby) are considered the biggest derby games. Stellenbosch (formerly Vasco de Gama) are also considered close rivals. Hope FC are the latest local rivals to Cape Town City. The first clash between these clubs in history went the way of the Citizens in front of a large crowd at Athlone Stadium.

There was also a rivalry against now-defunct Supersport United after the Telkom Knockout final in 2016 and the MTN 8 finals of 2017 and 2018 all being contested by the two clubs.

== Honours ==
Cape Town City won the 2016 Telkom Knockout Cup, defeating Supersport United 2–1 in the final on 10 December 2016. City scored 12 goals in four games during the tournament to win in 2016–17 Cape Town City F.C. season.

- Telkom Knockout
  - Winners: 2016
- MTN 8
  - Winners: 2018
  - Runners up: 2017, 2021

=== League record ===
==== Premiership ====
- 2016–17 – 3rd
- 2017–18 – 5th
- 2018–19 – 4th
- 2019–20 – 6th
- 2020–21 – 7th
- 2021–22 – 2nd
- 2022–23 – 4th
- 2023–24 – 5th
- 2024–25 – 15th (relegated)

=== National First Division ===
- 2025–26 – 2nd

== Legends ==
Cape Town City offers lifetime awards to a distinguished group of 30 Cape Town football "Legends". Notable players such as Thabo Mngomeni, David Nyathi, Ben Anderson, Bernard Hartze, Reggie Jantjies, Farouk Abrahams, Teko Modise, Craig Martin, Edmilson Dove and Lebogang Manyama feature as honourees on this list. This also includes the long-serving captain, Thamsanqa Mkhize.

The club's first manager, Eric Tinkler achieved early success. The club also has been managed by ex-South African footballer Benni McCarthy.

== Sponsors ==
In September 2025, the club signed a shirt sponsorship deal with SportPesa.
