= 2005 CONCACAF Gold Cup squads =

Below are the list of squads who participated in the 2005 CONCACAF Gold Cup.

== Group A ==
=== Colombia ===
Head coach: (Colombia) Reinaldo Rueda

No.	Pos.	Player	Date of birth (age)	Caps	Club
1	GK	Faryd Mondragón (c)	21 June 1971 (aged 34)		(Turkey) Galatasaray
2	DF	Andrés González	8 January 1984 (aged 21)		(Colombia) América de Cali
3	DF	José Julián de la Cuesta	10 February 1983 (aged 22)		(Spain) Cádiz CF
4	DF	Humberto Mendoza	2 October 1984 (aged 20)		(Colombia) Atlético Nacional
5	DF	Jair Benitez	12 January 1979 (aged 26)		(Colombia) Independiente Medellín
6	MF	Juan Carlos Ramírez	22 March 1972 (aged 33)		(Colombia) Independiente Santa Fe
7	FW	Oscar Briceño	6 September 1985 (aged 19)		(Colombia) Deportes Tolima
8	MF	Aldo Leão Ramírez	18 April 1981 (aged 24)		(Colombia) Independiente Santa Fe
9	FW	Wason Rentería	4 July 1985 (aged 20)		(Colombia) Boyacá Chicó
10	FW	Tressor Moreno	11 January 1979 (aged 26)		(Colombia) Once Caldas
11	FW	César Valoyes	5 January 1984 (aged 21)		(Colombia) Independiente Medellín
12	GK	Luis Enrique Martinez	11 July 1982 (aged 22)		(Colombia) Independiente Santa Fe
13	DF	Yulián Anchico	28 May 1984 (aged 21)		(Colombia) Deportes Tolima
14	DF	Hayder Palacio	22 July 1979 (aged 25)		(Colombia) Atlético Junior
15	MF	Jaime Castrillón	5 May 1983 (aged 22)		(Colombia) Independiente Medellín
16	FW	Héctor Hurtado	21 September 1975 (aged 29)		(Colombia) Atlético Nacional
17	MF	Jairo Patiño	5 April 1978 (aged 27)		(Argentina) River Plate
18	FW	Martin Arzuaga	23 July 1981 (aged 23)		(Colombia) Atlético Junior
19	MF	Juan Fernando Leal	2 August 1980 (aged 24)		(Colombia) Envigado
20	MF	Macnelly Torres	11 January 1984 (aged 21)		(Colombia) Atlético Junior
21	MF	Abel Aguilar	6 January 1985 (aged 20)		(Colombia) Deportivo Cali
22	MF	Freddy Guarín	30 June 1986 (aged 19)		(Colombia) Envigado
23	MF	Oscar Passo	13 May 1980 (aged 25)		(Colombia) Deportes Tolima

=== Honduras ===
Head coach: (Honduras) José de la Paz Herrera

No.	Pos.	Player	Date of birth (age)	Caps	Club
1	GK	Víctor Coello	29 September 1974 (aged 30)		(Honduras) C.D. Marathón
22	GK	Júnior Morales	4 March 1978 (aged 27)		(Honduras) Real C.D. España
25	GK	Christian Garden	22 September 1980 (aged 24)		(Honduras) CD Vida
4	DF	Samuel Caballero	24 December 1974 (aged 30)		(United States) Chicago Fire
3	DF	Maynor Figueroa	2 May 1983 (aged 22)		(Honduras) CD Olimpia
2	DF	Astor Henríquez	26 February 1983 (aged 22)		(Honduras) Universidad
6	DF	Júnior Izaguirre	12 August 1979 (aged 25)		(Honduras) C.D. Motagua
21	DF	Érick Vallecillo	29 January 1980 (aged 25)		(Honduras) Real C.D. España
13	MF	Mario René Berríos	29 May 1982 (aged 23)		(Honduras) CD Marathón
14	MF	Óscar Boniek García	4 September 1984 (aged 20)		(Honduras) CD Olimpia
23	MF	Mario Ivan Guerrero	30 November 1977 (aged 27)		(United States) Chicago Fire
24	MF	Luis Guifarro	25 August 1976 (aged 28)		Free agent
18	MF	Carlos Morán	19 July 1984 (aged 20)		(Honduras) C.D. Victoria
8	MF	Wilson Palacios	29 July 1984 (aged 20)		(Honduras) CD Olimpia
20	MF	Hendry Thomas	23 February 1985 (aged 20)		(Honduras) CD Olimpia
19	MF	Danilo Turcios	8 May 1978 (aged 27)		(Honduras) CD Olimpia
7	FW	Edgar Nuñez	23 August 1979 (aged 25)		(Honduras) Atlético Olanchano
11	FW	Milton Núñez	31 October 1972 (aged 32)		(Honduras) CD Marathón
9	FW	Francisco Ramírez	10 July 1976 (aged 28)		(Honduras) CD Platense
16	FW	Eddy Vega	13 August 1980 (aged 24)		(Honduras) CD Platense
10	FW	Wilmer Velásquez (c)	28 April 1972 (aged 33)		(Honduras) CD Olimpia

=== Panama ===
Head coach: (Colombia) José Hernández

No.	Pos.	Player	Date of birth (age)	Caps	Club
1	GK	Jaime Penedo	26 September 1981 (aged 23)		(Panama) CD Árabe Unido
2	DF	Carlos Rivera	30 May 1979 (aged 26)		(Colombia) Independiente Medellín
3	DF	Luis Moreno	19 March 1981 (aged 24)		(Colombia) Envigado Fútbol Club
4	DF	José Anthony Torres	27 August 1972 (aged 32)		(Honduras) CD Marathón
5	DF	Felipe Baloy	24 February 1981 (aged 24)		(Brazil) Paranaense
6	MF	Gabriel Enrique Gómez	29 May 1984 (aged 21)		(Panama) Tauro F.C.
7	FW	Jorge Dely Valdés	12 March 1967 (aged 38)		(Panama) CD Árabe Unido
8	MF	Alberto Blanco	8 January 1978 (aged 27)		(Russia) Alania Vladikavkaz
9	FW	Julio Dely Valdés (c)	12 March 1967 (aged 38)		(Panama) CD Árabe Unido
10	MF	Julio Medina III	14 July 1976 (aged 28)		(El Salvador) Águila
11	FW	Roberto Brown	15 July 1977 (aged 27)		(Panama) San Francisco F.C.
12	GK	José Calderon	14 August 1985 (aged 19)		(Panama) San Francisco F.C.
13	DF	Joel Solanilla	24 December 1983 (aged 21)		(Panama) Plaza Amador
14	DF	Román Torres	20 March 1986 (aged 19)		(Panama) Chepo F.C.
15	MF	Ricardo Phillips	31 January 1975 (aged 30)		(Panama) Tauro F.C.
16	DF	Ubaldo Guardia	8 June 1977 (aged 28)		(Panama) CD Árabe Unido
17	DF	Luis Alfonso Henriquez	23 November 1981 (aged 23)		(Panama) CD Árabe Unido
18	FW	Luis Tejada	28 March 1982 (aged 23)		(Colombia) Envigado Fútbol Club
19	MF	Gustavo Ávila	21 April 1981 (aged 24)		(Panama) CD Árabe Unido
20	MF	Engin Mitre	16 October 1981 (aged 23)		(Panama) Plaza Amador
21	MF	Ángel Luis Rodríguez	15 February 1976 (aged 29)		(Panama) San Francisco F.C.
22	GK	Oscar McFarlane	29 November 1980 (aged 24)		(Panama) Tauro F.C.
23	GK	Donaldo Gonzalez	27 November 1971 (aged 33)		(Honduras) CD Marathón

=== Trinidad and Tobago ===
Head coach: (Netherlands) Leo Beenhakker

No.	Pos.	Player	Date of birth (age)	Caps	Club
1	GK	Shaka Hislop	22 February 1969 (aged 36)	21	(Trinidad and Tobago) free agent
2	DF	David Charles	29 September 1977 (aged 27)	16	(Trinidad and Tobago) W Connection
3	DF	Avery John	18 June 1975 (aged 30)	43	(United States) New England Revolution
4	DF	Marvin Andrews	22 December 1975 (aged 29)	86	(Scotland) Rangers
5	DF	Brent Sancho	13 March 1977 (aged 28)	35	(Scotland) Dundee
6	DF	Dennis Lawrence	1 August 1974 (aged 30)	49	(Wales) Wrexham
7	MF	Chris Birchall	5 May 1984 (aged 21)	4	(England) Port Vale
8	MF	Angus Eve	23 February 1973 (aged 32)	115	(Trinidad and Tobago) San Juan Jabloteh
9	MF	Aurtis Whitley	1 May 1977 (aged 28)	11	(Trinidad and Tobago) San Juan Jabloteh
10	FW	Jason Scotland	18 February 1979 (aged 26)	17	(Scotland) Dundee United
11	MF	Carlos Edwards	24 October 1978 (aged 26)	40	(Wales) Wrexham
12	MF	Brent Rahim	8 August 1978 (aged 26)	47	(Scotland) Falkirk
13	FW	Cornell Glen	21 October 1980 (aged 24)	32	(United States) Columbus Crew
14	FW	Stern John (c)	30 October 1976 (aged 28)	81	(England) Coventry
15	FW	Kenwyne Jones	5 October 1984 (aged 20)	18	(England) Stoke City
16	DF	Anton Pierre	23 September 1977 (aged 27)	51	(Trinidad and Tobago) Defence Force
18	MF	Densill Theobald	27 June 1982 (aged 23)	31	(Trinidad and Tobago) Caledonia AIA
19	MF	Silvio Spann	21 August 1981 (aged 23)	18	(Japan) Yokohama FC
20	FW	Collin Samuel	27 August 1981 (aged 23)	10	(Scotland) Dundee
21	GK	Kelvin Jack	29 April 1976 (aged 29)	19	(Scotland) Dundee
22	GK	Daurance Williams	13 May 1983 (aged 22)	15	(Trinidad and Tobago) San Juan Jabloteh
23	DF	Glenton Wolfe	30 December 1981 (aged 23)	3	(Trinidad and Tobago) North East Stars
24	DF	Cyd Gray	21 November 1976 (aged 28)	29	(Trinidad and Tobago) San Juan Jabloteh

== Group B ==
=== Canada ===
Head coach: (Canada) Frank Yallop

No.	Pos.	Player	Date of birth (age)	Caps	Club
22	GK	Mike Franks	27 April 1977 (aged 28)	0	(Canada) Vancouver Whitecaps
1	GK	Greg Sutton	19 April 1977 (aged 28)	2	(Canada) Montreal Impact
2	DF	Adam Braz	7 June 1981 (aged 24)	0	(Canada) Montreal Impact
4	DF	Kevin McKenna (c)	21 January 1980 (aged 25)	27	(Germany) Energie Cottbus
5	DF	Gabriel Gervais	18 September 1976 (aged 28)	4	(Canada) Montreal Impact
3	DF	Chris Pozniak	10 January 1981 (aged 24)	12	(Norway) Haugesund
8	DF	Adrian Serioux	12 May 1979 (aged 26)	5	(England) Millwall
11	MF	Jim Brennan	8 May 1977 (aged 28)	38	(England) Norwich City
6	MF	Patrice Bernier	23 September 1979 (aged 25)	8	(Norway) Tromsø
18	MF	Rhian Dodds	3 October 1979 (aged 25)	0	(Scotland) Kilmarnock
12	MF	Sandro Grande	9 September 1977 (aged 27)	4	(Canada) Montreal Impact
13	MF	Atiba Hutchinson	8 February 1983 (aged 22)	12	(Sweden) Helsingborg
16	MF	Patrick Leduc	26 December 1977 (aged 27)	0	(Canada) Montreal Impact
17	MF	Jaime Peters	4 May 1987 (aged 18)	7	(England) Ipswich Town
15	MF	Josh Simpson	15 May 1983 (aged 22)	7	(England) Millwall
7	FW	Iain Hume	20 October 1983 (aged 21)	11	(England) Tranmere Rovers
14	FW	Dwayne De Rosario	15 May 1978 (aged 27)	29	(United States) San Jose Earthquakes
9	FW	Ali Gerba	27 July 1982 (aged 22)	0	(Canada) Montreal Impact
10	FW	Olivier Occean	23 October 1981 (aged 23)	9	(Norway) Odd Grenland

=== Costa Rica ===
Head coach: (Brazil) Alexandre Guimarães

No.	Pos.	Player	Date of birth (age)	Caps	Club
1	GK	Alvaro Mesén (c)	24 December 1972 (aged 32)		(Costa Rica) CS Herediano
3	DF	Roy Miller	24 November 1984 (aged 20)		(Costa Rica) C.S. Cartaginés
4	DF	Michael Umaña	16 July 1982 (aged 22)		(United States) Los Angeles Galaxy
5	DF	Gabriel Badilla	30 June 1984 (aged 21)		(Costa Rica) Deportivo Saprissa
6	DF	Danny Fonseca	7 November 1979 (aged 25)		(Costa Rica) C.S. Cartaginés
7	FW	Oscar Emilio Rojas	24 July 1979 (aged 25)		(Mexico) Dorados de Sinaloa
8	MF	José Luis López	31 March 1981 (aged 24)		(Costa Rica) Deportivo Saprissa
9	FW	Bryan Ruiz	18 August 1985 (aged 19)		(Costa Rica) LD Alajuelense
10	MF	Jafet Soto	1 April 1976 (aged 29)		(Costa Rica) CS Herediano
11	DF	Cristian Bolaños	17 May 1984 (aged 21)		(Costa Rica) Deportivo Saprissa
12	DF	Junior Díaz	12 September 1983 (aged 21)		(Costa Rica) CS Herediano
13	DF	Victor Cordero	9 November 1972 (aged 32)		(Costa Rica) Deportivo Saprissa
14	MF	Géiner Segura	14 October 1974 (aged 30)		(Costa Rica) Municipal Pérez Zeledón
15	DF	Harold Wallace	7 September 1975 (aged 29)		(Costa Rica) LD Alajuelense
17	FW	Steven Bryce	16 August 1977 (aged 27)		(Costa Rica) LD Alajuelense
18	GK	José Francisco Porras	8 November 1970 (aged 34)		(Costa Rica) Deportivo Saprissa
19	DF	Mauricio Wright	20 April 1970 (aged 35)		(Costa Rica) CS Herediano
20	MF	Douglas Sequeira	23 August 1977 (aged 27)		(United States) Chivas USA
21	FW	Randall Brenes	13 August 1983 (aged 21)		(Costa Rica) C.S. Cartaginés
23	GK	Donny Grant	12 April 1976 (aged 29)		(Costa Rica) Municipal Pérez Zeledón

=== Cuba ===
Head coach: (Cuba) Luis Armelio García

No.	Pos.	Player	Date of birth (age)	Caps	Club
1	GK	Odelin Molina (c)	3 August 1974 (aged 30)		(Cuba) FC Villa Clara
12	GK	Alexis Revé	17 November 1972 (aged 32)		(Cuba) FC Villa Clara
14	DF	Jaime Colomé	30 June 1979 (aged 26)		(Cuba) Ciudad Habana
5	DF	Alexander Cruzata	26 July 1974 (aged 30)		(Cuba) FC Holguín
18	DF	Leonel Duarte	1 August 1987 (aged 17)		(Cuba) Ciego de Avila
16	DF	Reysander Fernández	22 August 1984 (aged 20)		(Cuba) Ciego de Avila
2	DF	Silvio Pedro Miñoso	23 December 1976 (aged 28)		(Cuba) FC Villa Clara
8	MF	Disney Aquino	27 December 1977 (aged 27)		FC Santiago de Cuba
3	MF	Yénier Márquez	3 January 1979 (aged 26)		(Cuba) FC Villa Clara
7	MF	Jorge Luis Ramírez	11 July 1977 (aged 27)		(Cuba) CF Granma
4	MF	Marío Rodríguez	29 September 1977 (aged 27)		(Cuba) Ciudad Habana
6	MF	Enrique Villaurrutia	24 April 1985 (aged 20)		(Cuba) FC Cienfuegos
9	FW	Alain Cervantes	17 November 1983 (aged 21)		(Cuba) Ciego de Avila
17	FW	Pedro Adriani Faife	14 January 1984 (aged 21)		(Cuba) FC Villa Clara
13	FW	Maykel Galindo	28 January 1981 (aged 24)		(Cuba) FC Villa Clara
11	FW	Mario Gil	17 October 1985 (aged 19)		(Cuba) Ciudad Habana
15	FW	Gisbel Morales	13 October 1978 (aged 26)		(Cuba) FC Pinar del Río
10	FW	Lester Moré	13 September 1978 (aged 26)		(Cuba) Ciego de Avila
19	FW	Jensy Muñoz	26 January 1983 (aged 22)		(Cuba) Ciudad Habana
20	FW	Yaikel Pérez	17 May 1985 (aged 20)		(Cuba) Ciudad Habana

Yaikel Perez defected to the United States

Maykel Galindo defected to the United States

=== United States ===
Head coach: (United States) Bruce Arena

No.	Pos.	Player	Date of birth (age)	Caps	Club
1	GK	Marcus Hahnemann	15 June 1972 (aged 33)		(England) Reading
2	DF	Frankie Hejduk	5 August 1974 (aged 30)		(United States) Columbus Crew
3	DF	Greg Vanney	11 June 1974 (aged 31)		(France) Bastia
4	DF	Oguchi Onyewu	13 May 1982 (aged 23)		(Belgium) Standard Liège
5	MF	John O'Brien	29 August 1977 (aged 27)		(Netherlands) ADO
6	DF	Steve Cherundolo	19 February 1979 (aged 26)		(Germany) Hannover 96
7	MF	DaMarcus Beasley	24 May 1982 (aged 23)		(Netherlands) PSV
8	MF	Clint Dempsey	9 March 1983 (aged 22)		(United States) New England Revolution
9	FW	Santino Quaranta	14 October 1984 (aged 20)		(United States) D.C. United
10	FW	Landon Donovan	4 March 1982 (aged 23)		(United States) LA Galaxy
11	FW	Conor Casey	25 July 1981 (aged 23)		(Germany) FSV Mainz 05
12	DF	Jimmy Conrad	12 February 1977 (aged 28)		(United States) Kansas City Wizards
13	FW	Pat Noonan	2 August 1980 (aged 24)		(United States) New England Revolution
14	MF	Chris Armas	27 August 1972 (aged 32)		(United States) Chicago Fire
15	MF	Ben Olsen	3 May 1977 (aged 28)		(United States) D.C. United
16	FW	Josh Wolff	25 February 1977 (aged 28)		(United States) Kansas City Wizards
18	GK	Kasey Keller (c)	29 November 1969 (aged 35)		(Germany) Borussia Mönchengladbach
19	MF	Steve Ralston	14 June 1974 (aged 31)		(United States) New England Revolution
21	MF	Brad Davis	8 November 1981 (aged 23)		(United States) San Jose Earthquakes
22	DF	Tony Sanneh	1 June 1971 (aged 34)		(United States) Chicago Fire
23	DF	Eddie Pope	24 December 1973 (aged 31)		(United States) Real Salt Lake
24	GK	Matt Reis	28 March 1975 (aged 30)		(United States) New England Revolution
25	MF	Pablo Mastroeni	26 August 1976 (aged 28)		(United States) Colorado Rapids

== Group C ==
=== Guatemala ===
Head coach: (Honduras) Ramón Maradiaga

No.	Pos.	Player	Date of birth (age)	Caps	Club
1	GK	Miguel Ángel Klee	19 February 1977 (aged 28)		(Guatemala) Cobán Imperial
22	GK	Luis Pedro Molina	4 June 1977 (aged 28)		(Guatemala) Jalapa
25	GK	Paulo César Motta	29 March 1982 (aged 23)		(Guatemala) Municipal
4	DF	Denis Chen	9 August 1977 (aged 27)		(Guatemala) Imperial
6	DF	Gustavo Cabrera	13 December 1979 (aged 25)		(Guatemala) Comunicaciones
5	DF	Víctor Hernández	23 June 1981 (aged 24)		(Guatemala) Xelajú
13	DF	Néstor Martínez	13 March 1981 (aged 24)		(Guatemala) Comunicaciones
3	DF	Pablo Melgar	14 January 1980 (aged 25)		(Guatemala) Municipal
2	DF	Nelson Morales	20 September 1976 (aged 28)		(Guatemala) Imperial
14	DF	Elmer Ponciano	28 June 1978 (aged 27)		(Guatemala) Jalapa
26	DF	Angel Sanabria	26 July 1984 (aged 20)		(Guatemala) Imperial
24	MF	Maynor Davila	12 February 1982 (aged 23)		(Guatemala) Aurora
12	MF	Carlos Figueroa	19 April 1980 (aged 25)		(Guatemala) Municipal
21	MF	Rigoberto Gómez	9 January 1977 (aged 28)		(Guatemala) Comunicaciones
11	MF	Guillermo Ramírez	26 March 1978 (aged 27)		(United States) LA Galaxy
8	MF	Gonzalo Romero	25 March 1975 (aged 30)		(Guatemala) Municipal
7	MF	Fredy Thompson	2 June 1982 (aged 23)		(Guatemala) Comunicaciones
9	MF	José Zacarías Antonio	15 March 1982 (aged 23)		(Guatemala) Suchitepéquez
17	FW	Dwight Pezzarossi	4 September 1979 (aged 25)		(Guatemala) Comunicaciones
20	FW	Carlos Ruíz	15 September 1979 (aged 25)		(United States) Dallas
23	FW	Hernán Sandoval	22 July 1983 (aged 21)		(Guatemala) Comunicaciones
10	FW	Edwin Villatoro	18 February 1980 (aged 25)		(Guatemala) Suchitepéquez

=== Jamaica ===
Head coach: (Jamaica) Wendell Downswell

No.	Pos.	Player	Date of birth (age)	Caps	Club
1	GK	Shawn Sawyers	19 September 1976 (aged 28)		(Jamaica) Portmore United F.C.
3	DF	Damion Stewart	18 August 1980 (aged 24)		(Jamaica) Harbour View FC
4	DF	Jermaine Taylor	14 January 1985 (aged 20)		(Jamaica) Harbour View FC
5	DF	Tyrone Sawyers	27 April 1977 (aged 28)		(Jamaica) Portmore United F.C.
6	DF	Robert Scarlett	21 May 1981 (aged 24)		(Jamaica) Harbour View FC
8	DF	Lovel Palmer	30 August 1984 (aged 20)		(Jamaica) Harbour View FC
9	MF	Andrew Williams	23 September 1977 (aged 27)		(United States) Real Salt Lake
10	FW	Ricardo Fuller	31 October 1979 (aged 25)		(England) Portsmouth F.C.
11	FW	Roland Dean	25 April 1982 (aged 23)		(Jamaica) Tivoli Gardens FC
12	MF	Jermaine Johnson	26 June 1980 (aged 25)		(England) Oldham Athletic
13	GK	Leighton Murray	22 September 1977 (aged 27)		(Jamaica) Harbour View FC
14	DF	Tyrone Marshall	12 November 1974 (aged 30)		(United States) Los Angeles Galaxy
16	MF	Omar Daley	25 April 1981 (aged 24)		(Jamaica) Portmore United F.C.
17	MF	Jermaine Hue	15 June 1978 (aged 27)		(Jamaica) Harbour View FC
18	MF	Khari Stephenson	18 January 1981 (aged 24)		(United States) Kansas City Wizards
19	DF	Garfield Reid	14 January 1981 (aged 24)		(Jamaica) Rivoli United F.C.
20	FW	Damani Ralph	6 November 1980 (aged 24)		(United States) Chicago Fire
21	FW	Luton Shelton	11 November 1985 (aged 19)		(Jamaica) Harbour View FC
22	DF	Nicholy Finlayson	19 December 1985 (aged 19)		(Jamaica) Reno FC
23	FW	Teafore Bennett	7 June 1984 (aged 21)		(Jamaica) Portmore United F.C.
25	DF	Claude Davis	6 March 1979 (aged 26)		(England) Preston North End F.C.
30	GK	Donovan Ricketts	7 June 1977 (aged 28)		(England) Bradford City

=== Mexico ===
Head coach: (Argentina) Ricardo La Volpe

No.	Pos.	Player	Date of birth (age)	Caps	Club
1	GK	Moisés Muñoz	1 February 1980 (aged 25)		(Mexico) Monarcas Morelia
2	DF	Francisco Rodríguez	20 October 1981 (aged 23)		(Mexico) Guadalajara
3	DF	Carlos Salcido	2 April 1980 (aged 25)		(Mexico) Guadalajara
4	DF	Ricardo Osorio	30 March 1980 (aged 25)		(Mexico) Cruz Azul
5	MF	Israel López	29 September 1974 (aged 30)		(Mexico) Toluca
6	MF	Ismael Rodríguez	10 January 1981 (aged 24)		(Mexico) Monterrey
7	MF	Sinha	23 May 1976 (aged 29)		(Mexico) Toluca
8	MF	Rafael García	14 August 1974 (aged 30)		(Mexico) Cruz Azul
9	FW	Jared Borgetti	14 August 1973 (aged 31)		(Mexico) Pachuca
10	FW	Omar Bravo	4 March 1980 (aged 25)		(Mexico) Guadalajara
11	MF	Daniel Osorno	16 March 1979 (aged 26)		(Mexico) Atlas
12	GK	José de Jesús Corona	26 January 1981 (aged 24)		(Mexico) UAG
14	DF	Gonzalo Pineda	19 October 1982 (aged 22)		(Mexico) UNAM
15	MF	Carlos Morales	6 September 1979 (aged 25)		(Mexico) UANL
16	DF	Mario Méndez	1 June 1979 (aged 26)		(Mexico) Toluca
17	FW	Rafael Márquez Lugo	2 November 1981 (aged 23)		(Mexico) Monarcas Morelia
18	FW	Aaron Padilla	13 August 1977 (aged 27)		(Mexico) America
19	FW	Alberto Medina	29 May 1983 (aged 22)		(Mexico) Guadalajara
20	MF	Juan Pablo García	24 November 1981 (aged 23)		(Mexico) Atlas
21	MF	Gerardo Galindo	23 May 1978 (aged 27)		(Mexico) UNAM
22	DF	Héctor Altamirano	17 March 1977 (aged 28)		(Mexico) Santos
23	MF	Luis Ernesto Pérez	12 January 1981 (aged 24)		(Mexico) Monterrey
24	GK	Guillermo Ochoa	13 July 1985 (aged 19)		(Mexico) América

=== South Africa ===
Head coach: (England) Stuart Baxter

No.	Pos.	Player	Date of birth (age)	Caps	Club
1	GK	Calvin Marlin	20 April 1976 (aged 29)		(South Africa) SuperSport United
2	DF	Lucky Lekgwathi	8 January 1976 (aged 29)		(South Africa) Orlando Pirates
3	DF	Lucas Thwala	19 October 1981 (aged 23)		(South Africa) Orlando Pirates
4	DF	Phil Evans	12 July 1980 (aged 24)		(South Africa) SuperSport United
5	DF	Ricardo Katza	12 March 1978 (aged 27)		(South Africa) SuperSport United
6	FW	Siboniso Gaxa	6 April 1984 (aged 21)		(South Africa) SuperSport United
7	MF	Daine Klate	25 February 1985 (aged 20)		(South Africa) SuperSport United
8	MF	Siyabonga Siphika	24 April 1981 (aged 24)		(South Africa) Manning Rangers
9	FW	Lebohang Mokoena	29 September 1986 (aged 18)		(South Africa) Orlando Pirates
10	DF	Craig Bianchi	25 March 1978 (aged 27)		(South Africa) Mamelodi Sundowns
11	MF	Elrio van Heerden	11 July 1983 (aged 21)		(Denmark) FC Copenhagen
12	MF	Stanley Kgatla	13 September 1982 (aged 22)		(South Africa) Silver Stars
13	FW	Siyabonga Nkosi	22 August 1981 (aged 23)		(South Africa) Bloemfontein Celtic
14	FW	Siyabonga Nomvete	2 December 1977 (aged 27)		(Italy) Empoli
15	MF	Hleza Mofedi	18 January 1979 (aged 26)		(South Africa) Orlando Pirates
16	GK	Thabang Radebe	18 August 1979 (aged 25)		(South Africa) Orlando Pirates
17	MF	Reagan Noble	22 July 1983 (aged 21)		(South Africa) Wits University
18	FW	Abram Raselemane	23 March 1978 (aged 27)		(South Africa) SuperSport United
19	FW	Lungisani Ndlela	8 September 1980 (aged 24)		(South Africa) SuperSport United
20	DF	Peter Petersen	27 October 1981 (aged 23)		(South Africa) Moroka Swallows
21	MF	Gift Leremi	13 October 1984 (aged 20)		(South Africa) Orlando Pirates
22	GK	Lee Langeveldt	8 June 1985 (aged 20)		(South Africa) FC Fortune

== Player representation ==
=== By club ===
Players	Clubs
7	(Jamaica) Harbour View (South Africa) SuperSport United
6	(Canada) Montreal Impact (Cuba) Villa Clara (Guatemala) Comunicaciones (Honduras) Olimpia (Panama) Árabe Unido (South Africa) Orlando Pirates
5	(Costa Rica) Saprissa (Cuba) Ciudad Habana (Honduras) Marathón (United States) Chicago Fire (United States) New England Revolution
4	(Colombia) Envigado (Colombia) Independiente Medellín (Costa Rica) Herediano (Cuba) Ciego de Ávila (Guatemala) Cobán Imperial (Guatemala) Municipal (Jamaica) Portmore United (Mexico) Guadalajara (Trinidad and Tobago) San Juan Jabloteh (United States) LA Galaxy
3	(Colombia) Atlético Junior (Colombia) Deportes Tolima (Colombia) Santa Fe (Costa Rica) Alajuelense (Costa Rica) Cartaginés (Mexico) Toluca (Panama) San Francisco (Panama) Tauro (Scotland) Dundee (United States) Kansas City Wizards
2	(Colombia) Atlético Nacional (Costa Rica) Pérez Zeledón (England) Millwall (Guatemala) Jalapa (Guatemala) Suchitepéquez (Honduras) Platense (Honduras) Real España (Mexico) América (Mexico) Atlas (Mexico) Cruz Azul (Mexico) Monterrey (Mexico) Morelia (Mexico) UNAM (Panama) Plaza Amador (United States) Columbus Crew (United States) D.C. United (United States) Real Salt Lake (United States) San Jose Earthquakes (Wales) Wrexham
1	(Argentina) River Plate (Belgium) Standard Liège (Brazil) Atlético Paranaense (Canada) Vancouver Whitecaps (Colombia) América de Cali (Colombia) Boyacá Chicó (Colombia) Deportivo Cali; Cienfuegos; Granma; Holguín; Pinar del Río; Santiago de Cuba (Denmark) Copenhagen (El Salvador) Águila (England) Bradford City (England) Coventry City (England) Ipswich Town (England) Norwich City (England) Oldham Athletic (England) Port Vale (England) Portsmouth (England) Preston North End (England) Reading (England) Stoke City (England) Tranmere Rovers (France) Bastia (Germany) Borussia Mönchengladbach (Germany) Energie Cottbus (Germany) Hannover 96 (Germany) Mainz 05 (Guatemala) Aurora (Guatemala) Xelajú MC (Honduras) Atlético Olanchano (Honduras) Motagua (Honduras) Universidad (Honduras) Victoria (Honduras) Vida (Italy) Empoli (Jamaica) Reno (Jamaica) Rivoli United (Jamaica) Tivoli Gardens (Japan) Yokohama FC (Mexico) Dorados de Sinaloa (Mexico) Pachuca (Mexico) Santos Laguna (Mexico) UAG (Mexico) UANL (Netherlands) ADO Den Haag (Netherlands) PSV Eindhoven (Norway) Haugesund (Norway) Odd Grenland (Norway) Tromsø (Panama) Chepo (Russia) Alania (Scotland) Dundee United (Scotland) Falkirk (Scotland) Kilmarnock (Scotland) Rangers (South Africa) Bloemfontein Celtic (South Africa) FC Fortune (South Africa) Mamelodi Sundowns (South Africa) Manning Rangers (South Africa) Moroka Swallows (South Africa) Silver Stars (South Africa) Wits University (Spain) Cádiz CF (Sweden) Helsingborg (Trinidad and Tobago) Caledonia AIA (Trinidad and Tobago) Defence Force (Trinidad and Tobago) North East Stars (Trinidad and Tobago) W Connection (Turkey) Galatasaray (United States) Chivas USA (United States) Colorado Rapids (United States) FC Dallas

=== By club nationality ===
Nations in bold are represented by their national teams in the tournament.

Players	Clubs
28	**United States**
24	**Mexico**
22	**Colombia**
20	**Cuba**; **Guatemala**; **Honduras**; **South Africa**
17	**Costa Rica**
15	**Panama**
14	**Jamaica**
13	England
8	**Trinidad and Tobago**
7	**Canada**; Scotland
4	Germany
3	Norway
2	Netherlands; Wales
1	Argentina; Belgium; Brazil; Denmark; El Salvador; France; Italy; Japan; Russia; Spain; Sweden; Turkey

The above table is the same when it comes to league representation, with only the following exception:

- The English league has 15 players with the inclusion of two players coming from Wales-based Wrexham.
