= South Africa at the CONCACAF Gold Cup =

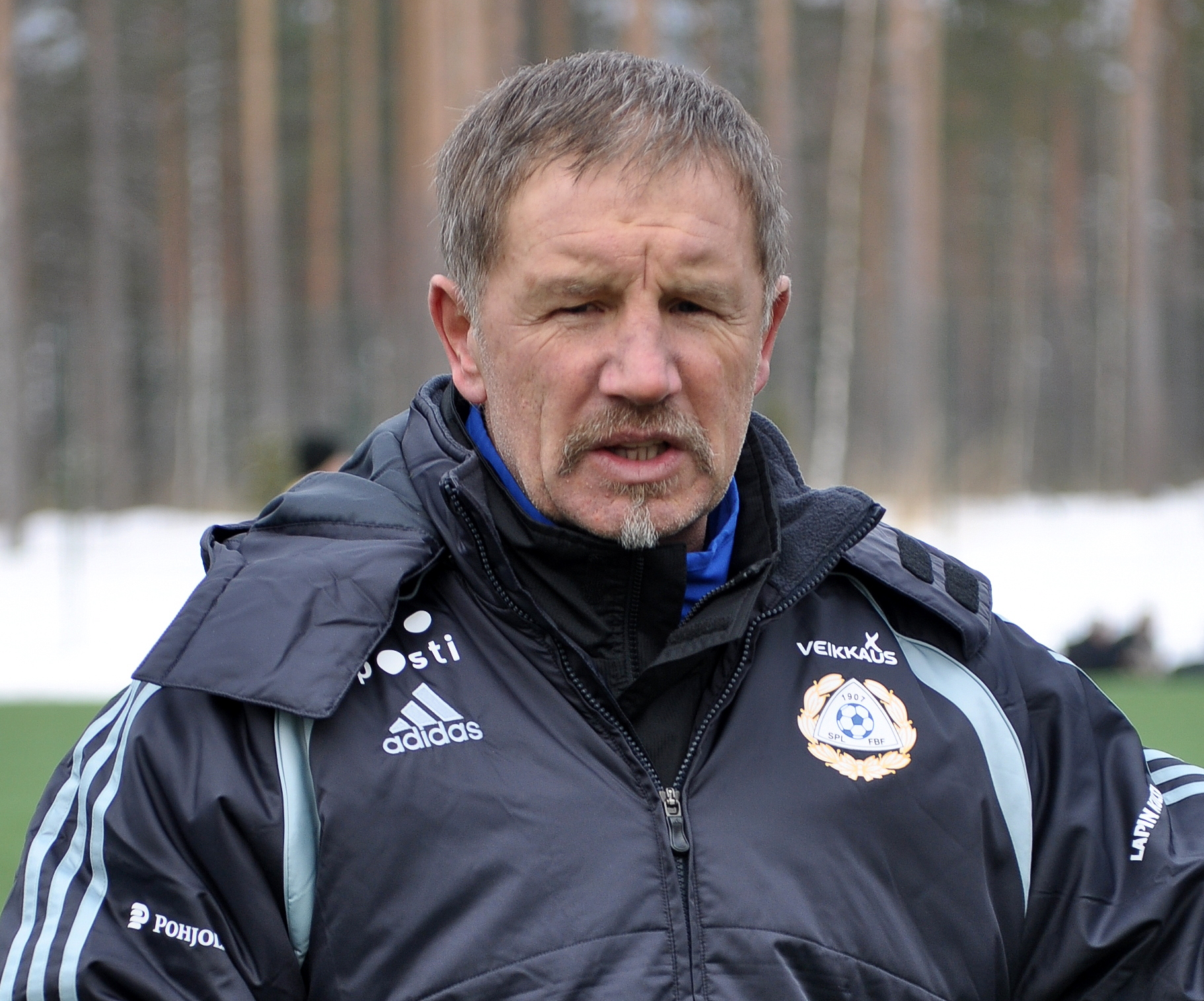
Stuart Baxter (here as head coach of Finland in 2009) was South Africa's coach at their appearance at the CONCACAF Gold Cup in 2005.

The CONCACAF Gold Cup is North America's major tournament in senior men's football and determines the continental champion. Until 1989, the tournament was known as CONCACAF Championship. It is currently held every two years. From 1996 to 2005, nations from other confederations have regularly joined the tournament as invitees. In earlier editions, the continental championship was held in different countries, but since the inception of the Gold Cup in 1991, the United States are constant hosts or co-hosts.

From 1973 to 1989, the tournament doubled as the confederation's World Cup qualification. CONCACAF's representative team at the FIFA Confederations Cup was decided by a play-off between the winners of the last two tournament editions in 2015 via the CONCACAF Cup, but was then discontinued along with the Confederations Cup.

Since the inaugural tournament in 1963, the Gold Cup was held 28 times and has been won by seven different nations, most often by Mexico (13 titles).

South Africa participated once, as invitees, in 2005. After defeating heavyweights Mexico in their first match, they followed up with a row of draws and were eliminated on penalties in the quarter-finals against Panama.

== Record at the CONCACAF Championship/Gold Cup ==
CONCACAF Gold Cup
Year	Result	Position	Pld	W	D	L	GF	GA
(United States) 2005	Quarter-finals	7th	4	1	3	0	7	6
Total	1/28	19/33	4	1	3	0	7	6

== Match overview ==
Tournament	Round	Opponent	Score	Venue
(United States) 2005	Group stage	Mexico	2–1	Carson
(United States) 2005	Group stage	Jamaica	3–3	Los Angeles
(United States) 2005	Group stage	Guatemala	1–1	Houston
(United States) 2005	Quarter-finals	Panama	1–1 (3–5 pen.)	Houston

== 2005 squad ==
In May 2005, that year's eventual South African league champions, the Kaizer Chiefs, were banned from African club competitions for three years after refusing to play a CAF Cup match in favour of a league match against Bloemfontein. Legally, the players would have been eligible for the CONCACAF Gold Cup but were notably not nominated.

Coach: (England) Stuart Baxter

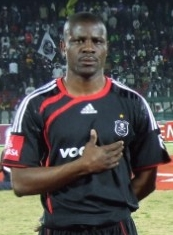
Defender Lucky Lekgwathi has played through all four CONCACAF Gold Cup matches for South Africa in 2005.

No.	Position	Name	Date of birth (age)	Club	Matches	Minutes	Goals
1	GK	Calvin Marlin	20 April 1976 (aged 29)	(South Africa) SuperSport United	3	300	0
2	DF	Lucky Lekgwathi	8 January 1976 (aged 29)	(South Africa) Orlando Pirates	4	390	0
3	DF	Lucas Thwala	19 October 1981 (aged 23)	(South Africa) Orlando Pirates	3	300	0
4	DF	Phil Evans	12 July 1980 (aged 24)	(South Africa) SuperSport United	4	390	1
5	DF	Ricardo Katza	12 March 1978 (aged 27)	(South Africa) SuperSport United	4	390	0
6	FW	Siboniso Gaxa	6 April 1984 (aged 21)	(South Africa) SuperSport United	3	300	0
7	MF	Daine Klate	25 January 1985 (aged 20)	(South Africa) SuperSport United	2	106	0
8	MF	Siyabonga Siphika	24 April 1981 (aged 24)	(South Africa) Manning Rangers	2	135	0
9	FW	Lebohang Mokoena	29 September 1986 (aged 18)	(South Africa) Orlando Pirates	1	65	0
10	DF	Craig Bianchi	25 March 1978 (aged 27)	(South Africa) Mamelodi Sundowns	3	125	0
11	MF	Elrio van Heerden	11 July 1983 (aged 21)	(Denmark) FC Copenhagen	4	322	1
12	MF	Stanley Kgatla	13 September 1982 (aged 22)	(South Africa) Silver Stars	1	2	0
13	FW	Siyabonga Nkosi	22 August 1981 (aged 23)	(South Africa) Bloemfontein Celtic	3	255	1
14	FW	Siyabonga Nomvethe	2 December 1977 (aged 27)	(Italy) Empoli FC	4	358	1
15	MF	Hleza Mofedi	18 January 1979 (aged 26)	(South Africa) Orlando Pirates	0	0	0
16	GK	Thabang Radebe	18 August 1979 (aged 25)	(South Africa) Orlando Pirates	1	90	0
17	MF	Reagan Noble	22 July 1983 (aged 21)	(South Africa) Wits FC	4	74	0
18	FW	Abram Raselemane	23 March 1978 (aged 27)	(South Africa) SuperSport United	3	176	1
19	FW	Lungisani Ndlela	8 September 1980 (aged 24)	(South Africa) SuperSport United	4	390	2
20	DF	Peter Petersen	27 February 1981 (aged 24)	(South Africa) Moroka Swallows	1	90	0
21	MF	Gift Leremi	13 October 1984 (aged 20)	(South Africa) Orlando Pirates	2	28	0
22	GK	Lee Langeveldt	8 June 1985 (aged 20)	(South Africa) FC Fortune	0	0	0

== See also ==
- South Africa at the Africa Cup of Nations
- South Africa at the FIFA Confederations Cup
- South Africa at the FIFA World Cup
