= South Africa national soccer team results (2000–2009) =

This page details the match results and statistics of the South Africa national soccer team from 2000 to 2009.

== Results ==
South Africa's score is shown first in each case.

No.	Date	Venue	Opponents	Score	Competition	Scorers	Att.	Ref.
108	23 January 2000	Baba Yara Stadium, Kumasi, Ghana (N)	Gabon	3–1	2000 African Cup of Nations	Ngobe 42', Bartlett 55', 77'	20,000	
109	27 January 2000	Baba Yara Stadium, Kumasi, Ghana (N)	DR Congo	1–0	2000 African Cup of Nations	Bartlett 44'	3,500	
110	2 February 2000	Baba Yara Stadium, Kumasi, Ghana (N)	Algeria	1–1	2000 African Cup of Nations	Bartlett 16'	2,000	
111	6 February 2000	Baba Yara Stadium, Kumasi, Ghana (N)	Ghana	1–0	2000 African Cup of Nations	Nomvethe 42'	40,000	
112	10 February 2000	National Stadium, Lagos, Nigeria (N)	Nigeria	0–2	2000 African Cup of Nations		40,000	
113	12 February 2000	Accra Sports Stadium, Accra, Ghana (N)	Tunisia	2–2 (4–3 p)	2000 African Cup of Nations	Bartlett 12', Nomvethe 61'	3,000	
114	8 April 2000	Setsoto Stadium, Maseru, Lesotho (A)	Lesotho	2–0	2002 FIFA World Cup qualification	Bartlett 40', Pule 71'	12,035	
115	23 April 2000	Free State Stadium, Bloemfontein, South Africa (H)	Lesotho	1–0	2002 FIFA World Cup qualification	Bartlett 49'	18,000	
116	29 April 2000	Royal Bafokeng Stadium, Rustenburg, South Africa (H)	Mauritius	3–0	2000 COSAFA Cup	Mayo 13' (pen.), Sapula 60', Nomvethe 78'	11,000	
117	28 May 2000	National Stadium, Ta' Qali, Malta (A)	Malta	1–0	Friendly	Mngomeni 89'	1,500	
118	3 June 2000	RFK Stadium, Washington, United States (N)	United States	0–4	2000 U.S. Cup		16,570	
119	7 June 2000	Cotton Bowl, Dallas, United States (N)	Mexico	2–4	2000 U.S. Cup	McCarthy 52', Mngomeni 89' (pen.)	27,815	
120	11 June 2000	Giants Stadium, East Rutherford, United States (N)	Republic of Ireland	1–2	2000 U.S. Cup	McCarthy 14'	45,008	
121	18 June 2000	Johann van Riebeeck Stadium, Witbank, South Africa (H)	Swaziland	2–0	2000 COSAFA Cup	Buckley 11', 48'	14,000	
122	9 July 2000	National Sports Stadium, Harare, Zimbabwe (A)	Zimbabwe	2–0 (Note: Match abandoned at 82 minutes due to crowd trouble, with the result allowed to stand.)	2002 FIFA World Cup qualification	Buckley 7', 83'	55,000	
123	29 July 2000	Boet Erasmus Stadium, Port Elizabeth, South Africa (H)	Zimbabwe	0–1	2000 COSAFA Cup		35,000	
124	3 September 2000	Stade Municipal, Pointe-Noire, Congo (A)	Congo	2–1	2002 African Cup of Nations qualification	Mngomeni 21', August 59'	25,000	
125	7 October 2000	Ellis Park Stadium, Johannesburg, South Africa (H)	France	0–0	Nelson Mandela Challenge		37,000	
126	16 December 2000	FNB Stadium, Johannesburg, South Africa (H)	Liberia	2–1	2002 African Cup of Nations qualification	Bartlett 49', Masinga 73'	10,000	
127	13 January 2001	Sir Anerood Jugnauth Stadium, Belle Vue Harel, Mauritius (A)	Mauritius	1–1	2002 African Cup of Nations qualification	Buckley 43'	5,000	
128	27 January 2001	Royal Bafokeng Stadium, Rustenburg, South Africa (H)	Burkina Faso	1–0	2002 FIFA World Cup qualification	Bartlett 17'	25,000	
129	25 February 2001	Chichiri Stadium, Blantyre, Malawi (A)	Malawi	2–1	2002 FIFA World Cup qualification	Masinga 26', Nomvethe 81'	60,000	
130	24 March 2001	Boet Erasmus Stadium, Port Elizabeth, South Africa (H)	Mauritius	3–0	2002 African Cup of Nations qualification	McCarthy 4', Phiri 14', Zuma 20'	20,000	
131	25 April 2001	Stadio Renato Curi, Perugia, Italy (A)	Italy	0–1	Friendly		26,524	
132	29 April 2001	Estádio do Maxaquene, Maputo, Mozambique (A)	Mozambique	3–0	2001 COSAFA Cup	Ndlanya 25', Nhleko 68', Mazibuko 89'	15,000	
133	5 May 2001	FNB Stadium, Johannesburg, South Africa (H)	Zimbabwe	2–1	2002 FIFA World Cup qualification	Bartlett 17', McCarthy 39'	15,000	
134	3 June 2001	SKD Stadium, Paynesville, Liberia (A)	Liberia	1–1	2002 African Cup of Nations qualification	Rabutla 39'	40,000	
135	17 June 2001	Kings Park Stadium, Durban, South Africa (H)	Congo	0–0	2002 African Cup of Nations qualification		45,000	
136	1 July 2001	Stade du 4 Août, Ouagadougou, Burkina Faso (A)	Burkina Faso	1–1	2002 FIFA World Cup qualification	Zuma 24'	22,770	
137	14 July 2001	Kings Park Stadium, Durban, South Africa (H)	Malawi	2–0	2002 FIFA World Cup qualification	Booth 6', August 55'	17,500	
138	21 July 2001	Chichiri Stadium, Blantyre, Malawi (A)	Malawi	0–1	2001 COSAFA Cup		45,000	
139	15 August 2001	Råsunda Stadium, Solna, Sweden (A)	Sweden	0–3	Friendly		28,776	
140	10 November 2001	FNB Stadium, Johannesburg, South Africa (H)	Egypt	1–0	Nelson Mandela Challenge	Bartlett 53'	10,000	
141	15 January 2002	Mmabatho Stadium, Mafikeng, South Africa (H)	Angola	1–0	Friendly	McCarthy 42'	15,000	
142	20 January 2002	Stade Amari Daou, Ségou, Mali (N)	Burkina Faso	0–0	2002 African Cup of Nations		12,000	
143	24 January 2002	Stade Amari Daou, Ségou, Mali (N)	Ghana	0–0	2002 African Cup of Nations		3,500	
144	30 January 2002	Stade Amari Daou, Ségou, Mali (N)	Morocco	3–1	2002 African Cup of Nations	Zuma 42', Mngomeni 48', Nomvethe 51'	5,000	
145	3 February 2002	Stade Abdoulaye Makoro Cissoko, Kayes, Mali (N)	Mali	0–2	2002 African Cup of Nations		15,000	
146	20 March 2002	Stadio Municipal, Pistoia, Italy (N)	Saudi Arabia	0–1	Friendly		100	
147	27 March 2002	Mikheil Meskhi Stadium, Tbilisi, Georgia (A)	Georgia	1–4	Friendly	Buckley 69'	20,000	
148	30 March 2002	Botswana National Stadium, Gaborone, Botswana (A)	Botswana	0–0 (5–4 p)	2002 COSAFA Cup		30,000	
149	17 April 2002	Estadio de La Condomina, Murcia, Spain (N)	Ecuador	0–0	Friendly		6,000	
150	12 May 2002	Kings Park Stadium, Durban, South Africa (H)	Madagascar	1–0	Friendly	Mngomeni 14'	35,000	
151	20 May 2002	Mong Kok Stadium, Hong Kong (N)	Scotland	2–0	2002 HKSAR Reunification Cup	T. Mokoena 20', Koumantarakis 82'	5,000	
152	23 May 2002	Mong Kok Stadium, Hong Kong (N)	Turkey	2–0	2002 HKSAR Reunification Cup	McCarthy 58', 90'	7,529	
153	2 June 2002	Asiad Main Stadium, Busan, South Korea (N)	Paraguay	2–2	2002 FIFA World Cup	Struway 62' (o.g.), Fortune 90+1' (pen.)	25,186	
154	8 June 2002	Daegu World Cup Stadium, Daegu, South Korea (N)	Slovenia	1–0	2002 FIFA World Cup	Nomvethe 4'	47,226	
155	12 June 2002	Daejeon World Cup Stadium, Daejeon, South Korea (N)	Spain	2–3	2002 FIFA World Cup	McCarthy 31', Radebe 53'	31,024	
156	21 July 2002	Boet Erasmus Stadium, Port Elizabeth, South Africa (H)	Madagascar	0–0 (4–1 p)	2002 COSAFA Cup		8,000	
157	24 August 2002	Peter Mokaba Stadium, Polokwane, South Africa (H)	Swaziland	4–1	2002 COSAFA Cup	T. Mokoena 28', 64', Pule 77', Fredericks 90'	30,000	
158	8 September 2002	Stade Félix Houphouët-Boigny, Abidjan, Ivory Coast (A)	Ivory Coast	0–0	2004 African Cup of Nations qualification		40,000	
159	21 September 2002	Chichiri Stadium, Blantyre, Malawi (A)	Malawi	3–1	2002 COSAFA Cup	Mayo 42', 58', Kauleza 88'	60,000	
160	28 September 2002	Kings Park Stadium, Durban, South Africa (H)	Malawi	1–0	2002 COSAFA Cup	Vilakazi 90'	20,000	
161	13 October 2002	Free State Stadium, Bloemfontein, South Africa (H)	Burundi	2–0	2004 African Cup of Nations qualification	Mayo 13', Buckley 39'	30,000	
162	23 October 2002	Sheikh Amri Abeid Memorial Stadium, Arusha, Tanzania (N)	Kenya	1–1 (3–5 p)	Castle Lager Cup	Kukame 59' (pen.)	15,000	
163	26 October 2002	National Stadium, Dar es Salaam, Tanzania (N)	Tanzania	1–1 (4–3 p)	Castle Lager Cup	Ntsoane 73'	6,000	
164	19 November 2002	Ellis Park Stadium, Johannesburg, South Africa (H)	Senegal	1–1 (1–4 p)	Nelson Mandela Challenge	Bartlett 66'	40,000	
165	29 March 2003	FNB Stadium, Johannesburg, South Africa (H)	Madagascar	2–0	Friendly	Manyathela 42', Ramarojaona 81' (o.g.)	5,000	
166	30 April 2003	Athlone Stadium, Cape Town, South Africa (H)	Jamaica	0–0	Friendly		25,000	
167	22 May 2003	Kings Park Stadium, Durban, South Africa (H)	England	1–2	Friendly	McCarthy 16'	48,000	
168	14 June 2003	Basil Kenyon Stadium, East London, South Africa (H)	Trinidad and Tobago	2–1	Friendly	Manyathela 20', 71' (pen.)	15,000	
169	22 June 2003	Peter Mokaba Stadium, Polokwane, South Africa (H)	Ivory Coast	2–1	2004 African Cup of Nations qualification	Bartlett 21', Nomvethe 65'	35,000	
170	6 July 2003	National Stadium, Bujumbura, Burundi (A)	Burundi	2–0	2004 African Cup of Nations qualification	T. Mokoena 1', Fredericks 29'	8,000	
171	19 July 2003	Jan Smuts Stadium, East London, South Africa (H)	Zimbabwe	0–1	2003 COSAFA Cup		7,000	
172	8 October 2003	Setsoto Stadium, Maseru, Lesotho (A)	Lesotho	3–0	Friendly	Moshoeu 23', Seema 66' (o.g.), Raselemane 72'	20,000	
173	11 October 2003	Olën Park, Potchefstroom, South Africa (H)	Costa Rica	2–1	Nelson Mandela Challenge	Nomvethe 74', Mayo 86'	17,000	
174	15 November 2003	Cairo International Stadium, Cairo, Egypt (A)	Egypt	1–2	Friendly	McCarthy 50'	10,000	
175	19 November 2003	Stade El Menzah, Tunis, Tunisia (A)	Tunisia	0–2	Friendly		12,000	
176	10 January 2004	Stade George V, Curepipe, Mauritius (A)	Mauritius	0–2	2004 COSAFA Cup		5,230	
177	18 January 2004	Stade Leopold Sedar Senghor, Dakar, Senegal (A)	Senegal	1–2	Friendly	Nomvethe 14'	50,000	
178	27 January 2004	Stade Taïeb M'Hiri, Sfax, Tunisia (N)	Benin	2–0	2004 African Cup of Nations	Nomvethe 58', 76'	12,000	
179	31 January 2004	Stade Mustapha Ben Jannet, Monastir, Tunisia (N)	Nigeria	0–4	2004 African Cup of Nations		15,000	
180	4 February 2004	Stade Olympique de Sousse, Sousse, Tunisia (N)	Morocco	1–1	2004 African Cup of Nations	Mayo 29'	3,000	
181	30 March 2004	Loftus Road, London, England (N)	Australia	0–1	Friendly		16,108	
182	5 June 2004	Free State Stadium, Bloemfontein, South Africa (H)	Cape Verde	2–1	2006 FIFA World Cup qualification	Mabizela 41', 69'	33,000	
183	20 June 2004	Baba Yara Stadium, Kumasi, Ghana (A)	Ghana	0–3	2006 FIFA World Cup qualification		25,000	
184	3 July 2004	FNB Stadium, Johannesburg, South Africa (H)	Burkina Faso	2–0	2006 FIFA World Cup qualification	Pienaar 13', Bartlett 41'	9,000	
185	18 August 2004	Stade El Menzah, Tunis, Tunisia (A)	Tunisia	2–0	Friendly	McCarthy 2', Arendse 82'	4,000	
186	5 September 2004	Stade des Martyrs, Kinshasa, DR Congo (A)	DR Congo	0–1	2006 FIFA World Cup qualification		100,000	
187	10 October 2004	Mandela National Stadium, Kampala, Uganda (A)	Uganda	1–0	2006 FIFA World Cup qualification	McCarthy 68' (pen.)	50,000	
188	17 November 2004	Ellis Park Stadium, Johannesburg, South Africa (H)	Nigeria	2–1	Nelson Mandela Challenge	Bartlett 23', Vilakazi 60'	39,917	
189	10 February 2005	Kings Park Stadium, Durban, South Africa (H)	Australia	1–1	Friendly	McCarthy 12'	30,000	
190	26 February 2005	Stade George V, Curepipe, Mauritius (N)	Seychelles	3–0	2005 COSAFA Cup	Mphela 12', 16', Chabangu 44'	3,000	
191	27 February 2005	Stade George V, Curepipe, Mauritius (N)	Mauritius	1–0	2005 COSAFA Cup	Mphela 36'	3,500	
192	26 March 2005	FNB Stadium, Johannesburg, South Africa (H)	Uganda	2–1	2006 FIFA World Cup qualification	Fortune 21' (pen.), Pienaar 71'	20,000	
193	4 June 2005	Estádio da Várzea, Praia, Cape Verde (A)	Cape Verde	2–1	2006 FIFA World Cup qualification	McCarthy 10', Buckley 12'	6,000	
194	18 June 2005	FNB Stadium, Johannesburg, South Africa (H)	Ghana	0–2	2006 FIFA World Cup qualification		50,000	
195	8 July 2005	Home Depot Center, Carson, United States (N)	Mexico	2–1	2005 Gold Cup	Evans 28', van Heerden 41'	27,000	
196	10 July 2005	L.A. Coliseum, Los Angeles, United States (N)	Jamaica	3–3	2005 Gold Cup	Raselemane 35', Ndlela 41', Nomvethe 56'	30,710	
197	13 July 2005	Reliant Stadium, Houston, United States (N)	Guatemala	1–1	2005 Gold Cup	Nkosi 47'	45,311	
198	17 July 2005	Reliant Stadium, Houston, United States (N)	Panama	1–1 (a.e.t.) (3–5 p)	2005 Gold Cup	Ndlela 68'	60,050	
199	13 August 2005	Mmabatho Stadium, Mafikeng, South Africa (H)	Zambia	2–2 (8–9 p)	2005 COSAFA Cup	Ndlela 63', Raselemane 68'	3,000	
200	17 August 2005	Laugardalsvöllur, Reykjavík, Iceland (A)	Iceland	1–4	Friendly	Buckley 28'	3,302	
201	3 September 2005	Stade Municipal, Ouagadougou, Burkina Faso (A)	Burkina Faso	1–3	2006 FIFA World Cup qualification	Zuma 76'	25,000	
202	7 September 2005	Weser-Stadion, Bremen, Germany (A)	Germany	2–4	Friendly	Bartlett 26', McCarthy 50'	28,100	
203	8 October 2005	Kings Park Stadium, Durban, South Africa (H)	DR Congo	2–2	2006 FIFA World Cup qualification	Zuma 5', 52'	35,000	
204	12 November 2005	FNB Stadium, Johannesburg, South Africa (H)	Senegal	2–3	Nelson Mandela Challenge	8', 53'		
205	14 January 2006	Cairo International Stadium, Cairo, Egypt (A)	Egypt	2–1	Friendly	Zaki 13' (o.g.), McCarthy 44'		
206	22 January 2006	Harras El-Hedoud Stadium, Alexandria, Egypt (N)	Guinea	0–2	2006 Africa Cup of Nations		27,000	
207	26 January 2006	Harras El-Hedoud Stadium, Alexandria, Egypt (N)	Tunisia	0–2	2006 Africa Cup of Nations		10,000	
208	30 January 2006	Alexandria Stadium, Alexandria, Egypt (N)	Zambia	0–1	2006 Africa Cup of Nations		4,000	
209	9 May 2006	Setsoto Stadium, Maseru, Lesotho (A)	Lesotho	0–0	Friendly			
210	20 May 2006	Botswana National Stadium, Gaborone, Botswana (N)	Swaziland	1–0	2006 COSAFA Cup	Mhlongo 12'	5,000	
211	21 May 2006	Botswana National Stadium, Gaborone, Botswana (N)	Botswana	0–0 (5–6 p)	2006 COSAFA Cup		12,000	
212	16 August 2006	Sam Nujoma Stadium, Windhoek, Namibia (A)	Namibia	1–0	Friendly	Mashego	7,000	
213	2 September 2006	FNB Stadium, Johannesburg, South Africa (H)	Congo	0–0	2008 Africa Cup of Nations qualification			
214	8 October 2006	Independence Stadium, Lusaka, Zambia (A)	Zambia	1–0	2008 Africa Cup of Nations qualification	A. Mokoena 28'		
215	15 November 2006	Griffin Park, London, England (N)	Egypt	0–1	Nelson Mandela Challenge		2,000	
216	13 March 2007	FNB Stadium, Johannesburg, South Africa (H)	Swaziland	1–1	Friendly			
217	24 March 2007	Stade Omnisports Idriss Mahamat Ouya, N'Djamena, Chad (A)	Chad	3–0	2008 Africa Cup of Nations qualification	Moriri 32', Buckley 45', Zuma 78'		
218	28 March 2007	Orlando Stadium, Johannesburg, South Africa (H)	Bolivia	0–1	Friendly		5,000	
219	26 May 2007	Somhlolo National Stadium, Lobamba, Swaziland (N)	Malawi	0–0 (5–4 p)	2007 COSAFA Cup		4,000	
220	27 May 2007	Somhlolo National Stadium, Lobamba, Swaziland (N)	Mauritius	2–0	2007 COSAFA Cup	Modise 43' (pen.), 65'		
221	2 June 2007	Kings Park Stadium, Durban, South Africa (H)	Chad	4–0	2008 Africa Cup of Nations qualification	Morris 13' (pen.), Zuma 23', 33', Nomvethe 69'		
222	16 June 2007	Stade Municipal, Pointe-Noire, Congo (A)	Congo	1–1	2008 Africa Cup of Nations qualification	Zuma 47'		
223	22 August 2007	Pittodrie Stadium, Aberdeen, Scotland (A)	Scotland	0–1	Friendly		13,723	
224	9 September 2007	Newlands Stadium, Cape Town, South Africa (H)	Zambia	1–3	2008 Africa Cup of Nations qualification	McCarthy 50'		
225	12 September 2007	Ellis Park Stadium, Johannesburg, South Africa (H)	Uruguay	0–0	Friendly		6,000	
226	29 September 2007	Atteridgeville Super Stadium, Tshwane, South Africa (N)	Botswana	1–0	2007 COSAFA Cup	Modise 32'		
227	17 October 2007	Stadio Artemio Franchi, Siena, Italy (A)	Italy	0–2	Friendly		7,219	
228	24 October 2007	Free State Stadium, Bloemfontein, South Africa (H)	Zambia	0–0 (4–3 p)	2007 COSAFA Cup			
229	17 November 2007	Ellis Park Stadium, Johannesburg, South Africa (H)	United States	0–1	Nelson Mandela Challenge		30,000	
230	20 November 2007	Kings Park Stadium, Durban, South Africa (H)	Canada	2–0	Friendly	Modise 39', 45+2' (pen.)	12,000	
231	13 January 2008	Chatsworth Stadium, Durban, South Africa (H)	Mozambique	2–0	Friendly	Zuma 62', Chabangu 90'		
232	16 January 2008	King Zwelithini Stadium, Durban, South Africa (H)	Botswana	2–1	Friendly	Moon 41', Zuma 81'		
233	23 January 2008	Tamale Stadium, Tamale, Ghana (N)	Angola	1–1	2008 African Cup of Nations	van Heerden 87'	15,000	
234	27 January 2008	Tamale Stadium, Tamale, Ghana (N)	Tunisia	1–3	2008 African Cup of Nations	Mphela 86'	12,000	
235	31 January 2008	Baba Yara Stadium, Kumasi, Ghana (N)	Senegal	1–1	2008 African Cup of Nations	van Heerden 14'	15,000	
236	11 March 2008	Germiston Stadium, Germiston, South Africa (H)	Zimbabwe	2–1	Friendly	Ngcobo 73', Matola 90' (o.g.)		
237	26 March 2008	Atteridgeville Super Stadium, Tshwane, South Africa (H)	Paraguay	3–0	Friendly	Moriri 30', McCarthy 46', Tshabalala 63'	15,000	
238	1 June 2008	Abuja National Stadium, Abuja, Nigeria (A)	Nigeria	0–2	2010 FIFA World Cup qualification		50,000	
239	7 June 2008	Atteridgeville Super Stadium, Tshwane, South Africa (H)	Equatorial Guinea	4–1	2010 FIFA World Cup qualification	Dikgacoi 9', 90', Moriri 33', Fanteni 62'	10,000	
240	14 June 2008	National Stadium, Freetown, Sierra Leone (A)	Sierra Leone	0–1	2010 FIFA World Cup qualification		15,000	
241	21 June 2008	Atteridgeville Super Stadium, Tshwane, South Africa (H)	Sierra Leone	0–0	2010 FIFA World Cup qualification		12,000	
242	19 August 2008	Craven Cottage, London, England (N)	Australia	2–2	Friendly	Nkosi 21', Modise 58'	10,000	
243	6 September 2008	Boet Erasmus Stadium, Port Elizabeth, South Africa (H)	Nigeria	0–1	2010 FIFA World Cup qualification		25,000	
244	9 September 2008	Atteridgeville Super Stadium, Tshwane, South Africa (H)	Guinea	0–1	Friendly		2,000	
245	30 September 2008	Germiston Stadium, Germiston, South Africa (H)	Malawi	3–0	Friendly	Parker 32', 80', Klate 90'		
246	11 October 2008	Estadio de Malabo, Malabo, Equatorial Guinea (A)	Equatorial Guinea	1–0	2010 FIFA World Cup qualification	Tshabalala 9'	6,500	
247	15 October 2008	Free State Stadium, Bloemfontein, South Africa (H)	Ghana	2–1	Friendly	McCarthy 39', Parker 75'		
248	19 November 2008	Olympia Park, Rustenburg, South Africa (H)	Cameroon	3–2	Nelson Mandela Challenge	Modise 6', 23', Parker 82'		
249	27 January 2009	Atteridgeville Super Stadium, Tshwane, South Africa (H)	Zambia	1–0	Friendly	Modise 57'	10,125	
250	11 February 2009	Peter Mokaba Stadium, Polokwane, South Africa (H)	Chile	0–2	Friendly			
251	28 March 2009	Royal Bafokeng Stadium, Rustenburg, South Africa (H)	Norway	2–1	Nelson Mandela Challenge	Parker 7', Tshabalala 90'	30,000	
252	31 March 2009	Stade olympique de la Pontaise, Lausanne, Switzerland (N)	Portugal	0–2	Friendly		14,659	
253	6 June 2009	Orlando Stadium, Johannesburg, South Africa (H)	Poland	1–0	Friendly	Fanteni 6'	8,000	
254	14 June 2009	Ellis Park Stadium, Johannesburg, South Africa (N)	Iraq	0–0	2009 FIFA Confederations Cup		48,837	
255	17 June 2009	Royal Bafokeng Stadium, Rustenburg, South Africa (N)	New Zealand	2–0	2009 FIFA Confederations Cup	Parker 21', 52'	32,500	
256	20 June 2009	Free State Stadium, Bloemfontein, South Africa (N)	Spain	0–2	2009 FIFA Confederations Cup		38,212	
257	25 June 2009	Ellis Park Stadium, Johannesburg, South Africa (N)	Brazil	0–1	2009 FIFA Confederations Cup		60,000	
258	28 June 2009	Royal Bafokeng Stadium, Rustenburg, South Africa (N)	Spain	2–3 (a.e.t.)	2009 FIFA Confederations Cup	Mphela 73', 90'	21,500	
259	12 August 2009	Atteridgeville Super Stadium, Tshwane, South Africa (H)	Serbia	1–3	Friendly	Mphela 90'	10,000	
260	5 September 2009	BayArena, Leverkusen, Germany (A)	Germany	0–2	Friendly		29,569	
261	8 September 2009	Thomond Park, Limerick, Ireland (A)	Republic of Ireland	0–1	Friendly		14,572	
262	19 September 2009	Griqua Park, Kimberley, South Africa (H)	Madagascar	1–0	Friendly	Mphela 65'		
263	10 October 2009	Ullevaal Stadion, Oslo, Norway (A)	Norway	0–1	Friendly		13,054	
264	13 October 2009	Laugardalsvöllur, Reykjavík, Iceland (A)	Iceland	0–1	Friendly		3,253	
265	14 November 2009	Nelson Mandela Bay Stadium, Port Elizabeth, South Africa (H)	Japan	0–0	Friendly		40,000	
266	17 November 2009	Free State Stadium, Bloemfontein, South Africa (H)	Jamaica	0–0	Friendly		15,000	
