= Dwayne Miller =

Jamaican footballer (born 1987)

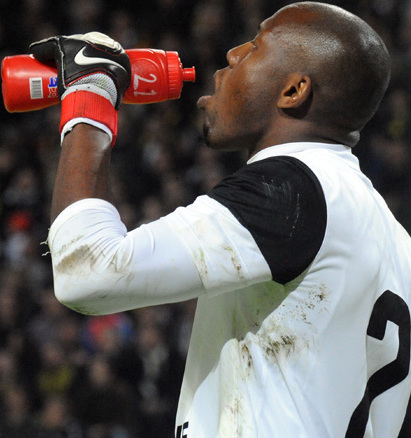

Personal information
- Full name: Dwayne St Aubyn Miller
- Date of birth: 14 July 1987 (age 39)
- Place of birth: St. Thomas, Jamaica
- Height: 6 ft 3 in (1.91 m)
- Position: Goalkeeper

Team information
- Current team: Eskilstuna City
- Number: 1

Youth career
- 2000–2003: York United

Senior career*
Years	Team	Apps	(Gls)
2004–2005	Tivoli Gardens		
2005–2010	Harbour View	92	(0)
2010–2013	Syrianska FC	86	(0)
2015	Syrianska FC	13	(0)
2017–2020	Syrianska FC	31	(0)
2021–	Eskilstuna City	25	(0)

International career^{‡}
2007	Jamaica U20	12	(0)
2007–	Jamaica	44	(0)
Medal record
Men's football
Representing Jamaica
CONCACAF Gold Cup
Runner-up	2015 United States–Canada	Team
Runner-up	2017 United States	Team
- * Club domestic league appearances and goals as of 3 April 2018 ‡ National team caps and goals as of 17 November 2020

Dwayne St Aubyn Miller (born 14 July 1987) is a Jamaican professional footballer who plays as a goalkeeper for Swedish club Eskilstuna City. He has won more than 40 caps for the Jamaica national team. Miller was also part of the squad that reached the final and won the silver medal at the 2007 Pan American Games.

== Club career ==
=== Tivoli Gardens ===
Miller started his career at Tivoli Gardens in 2004, before moving to Harbour View in 2005.

=== Harbour View ===
Miller was voted as "Junior Player of the Season" for the 2006–07 season. He featured in the CONCACAF Champions League preliminary round against UNAM Pumas (Mexico) in 2008.

=== Syrianska ===
Miller signed a two-year contract in March 2010, with Swedish club Syrianska, playing in the second-tier Superettan, following a successful trial.

Miller started as the second choice in the season beginning of 2010 Superettan. The team were said to have an outside chance for promotion but they succeeded by winning the league and gaining promotion to the Swedish topflight of Allsvenskan. Syrianska had a bad start, with many conceded goals. In the first 12 games, they conceded 20 goals. Around that time, Miller was set to be the first choice. In the following 18 games, Syrianska only lost one game, and only conceded seven goals – with nine clean sheets in the last 11 games. Miller had a huge impact in the team's performances and ended up the season with 21 games as a starter, conceding 14 goals, with 13 clean sheets and a saving percentage of 82%, which was the best of all goalkeepers in the league.

== International career ==
Miller was a part of the Jamaica under-20 squad that reached the final and won silver at the 2007 Pan American Games.

The goalkeeper made his full-international debut for Jamaica in the 2–0 away win against Malaysia in the friendly on 28 June 2007. He earned his second cap against Iran, conceding four goals before being replaced at half-time for Richard McCallum. Jamaica eventually lost 8–1.

He made an appearance for Jamaica in their victorious 2008 Caribbean Championship campaign against Guadeloupe in the semi-final on 11 December 2008. He was called up again to Jamaica to face Nigeria at the New Den on 11 February 2009, in place of Donovan Ricketts who was forced to withdraw with a damaged finger. However, Miller was an unused sub in the 0–0 stalemate whilst Shawn Sawyers started in goal. He played for Jamaica in their international friendly on 12 August, against Ecuador at Giants Stadium in New Jersey, United States. In 2010, Miller featured in several matches for Jamaica senior national team including a title-winning performance in the 2010 Caribbean Championship in Martinique in December.

== Honours ==
Harbour View

- Jamaica National Premier League: 2007, 2010
- CFU Club Championship: 2007
- Jamaica National Premier League U21: 2006, 2007

Syrianska FC

- Superettan: 2010

Jamaica

- Caribbean Cup: 2008, 2010
- Pan American Games runner-up: 2007
- CONCACAF Gold Cup runner-up: 2015, 2017
