= Alexis Revé =

Cuban footballer

Personal information
- Full name: Alexis Revé Avilés
- Date of birth: November 17, 1972 (age 53)
- Place of birth: Cuba
- Position: Goalkeeper

Senior career*
| Years | Team | Apps | (Gls) |
| –2006 | Villa Clara | | |

International career^{‡}
| 1996–2005 | Cuba | 12 | (0) |
- * Club domestic league appearances and goals ‡ National team caps and goals as of 1 January 2018

Alexis Revé Avilés (born 17 November 1972) is a Cuban retired footballer.

== Club career ==
He played his entire career for local provincial side Villa Clara.

== International career ==
Revé played at the 1989 FIFA U-16 World Championship and made his senior international debut for Cuba in a December 1996 World Cup qualification match against Panama. He has earned a total of 12 caps, scoring no goals and has mostly been second choice to the evergreen Odelín Molina between the Cuban sticks. He represented his country at 4 CONCACAF Gold Cup final tournaments.

His final international was a July 2005 CONCACAF Gold Cup match against Canada.
