= Juan Fernando Leal =

Colombian footballer (born 1980)

Juan Leal
Personal information
- Date of birth: 2 August 1980 (age 46)
- Place of birth: Medellín, Colombia
- Height: 1.81 m (5 ft 11 in)
- Position: Midfielder

Youth career
- Envigado

Senior career*
Years	Team	Apps	(Gls)
1999–2001	Envigado	106	(9)
2002–2003	Independiente Medellín	61	(1)
2004	Independiente Santa Fe	14	(1)
2005	Atlético Junior	5	(0)
2005	Envigado	13	(0)
2006	Millonarios	37	(2)
2007	Independiente Medellín	17	(1)
2008–2009	Envigado	58	(1)
2010–2011	Independiente Medellín	20	(1)

International career
2004–2005	Colombia	4	(0)
- * Club domestic league appearances and goals

Juan Fernando Leal Arango (born 2 August 1980) is a Colombian former professional footballer who played as a midfielder.

== Club career ==
Leal began his career at Envigado in 1999, staying at the club until 2001. For the 2002 season, he moved to Independiente Medellín and won the 2002 Finalizacion title with the club, playing both legs of the finals against Deportivo Pasto. In 2003, he also made a few appearances in the Copa Libertadores, where Medellín had a great campaign and were eliminated in the semi-finals.

In 2004, he played with Independiente Santa Fe. In the 2005 Apertura, he played with Atlético Junior, and for that years Finalizacion tournament he made a return to Envigado. For 2006, he played with Millonarios, and in 2007 made another return to Independiente Medellín.

From 2008 to 2009, Leal had a third stint with Envigado. In October 2009, after a loss against Deportes Tolima, Leal assaulted a referee and was hit with a six-month ban, as well as a COL$5,000,000 fine.

In 2010, Leal made a third return to Independiente Medellín. However, he missed the 2010 Apertura because of his ban, but returned for the 2010 Finalizacion and was an important player for El Poderoso. At the conclusion of the 2011 Apertura, Leal announced his retirement.

== International career ==
Leal was part of the Colombia national team from 2004 to 2005, making one appearance in 2006 World Cup qualifiers, and three at the 2005 CONCACAF Gold Cup.

== Honours ==
Independiente Medellín

- Categoria Primera A: 2002 Finalizacion
