= Ángel Sanabria =

Guatemalan footballer

Personal information
- Full name: Ángel David Sanabria Álvarez
- Date of birth: July 26, 1984 (age 42)
- Place of birth: Poptún, Guatemala
- Height: 1.71 m (5 ft 7 1/2 in)
- Position: Defender

Team information
- Current team: Heredia

Youth career
- Poptún

Senior career*
Years	Team	Apps	(Gls)
2004–2005	Cobán Imperial	28	(1)
2005–2006	Comunicaciones	33	(2)
2007	Zacapa	14	(2)
2007	Xelajú MC	6	(0)
2008	Comunicaciones		
2008–2009	Heredia Jaguares		
2009–2010	Jalapa		
2010–present	Heredia Jaguares		

International career^{‡}
2004–2006	Guatemala	35	(0)
- * Club domestic league appearances and goals as of 13 July 2010 ‡ National team caps and goals as of 13 July 2010

Ángel David Sanabria Álvarez (born 26 July 1984) is a Guatemalan football defender who currently plays for Heredia Jaguares de Peten of the Guatemalan premier division.

== Club career ==
Sanabria started his professional career at Cobán Imperial and has played for several Guatemalan top level sides, among them local giants Comunicaciones and Xelajú MC whom he left after only a short spell. He joined Heredia in 2008 to be closer to his family and moved to then champions Jalapa in July 2009.

== International career ==
He made his debut for Guatemala in a July 2004 friendly match against El Salvador and has earned a total of 35 caps, scoring no goals. He has represented his country in 12 FIFA World Cup qualification matches and played at the 2005 UNCAF Nations Cup and the 2005 CONCACAF Gold Cup

His most recent international was an October 2006 friendly match against Honduras.
