= Zacarías Antonio =

Guatemalan footballer (born 1982)

Personal information
- Full name: José Zacarías Antonio Beletzuy
- Date of birth: March 15, 1982 (age 44)
- Place of birth: Guatemala City, Guatemala
- Height: 1.66 m (5 ft 5 1/2 in)
- Position: Midfielder

Team information
- Current team: Deportivo Coatepeque
- Number: 13

Senior career*
Years	Team	Apps	(Gls)
2004–2009	Xelajú MC	75	(7)
2009–	Deportivo Coatepeque		

International career^{‡}
2003–2005	Guatemala	17	(0)
- * Club domestic league appearances and goals as of 12 July 2010 ‡ National team caps and goals as of 12 July 2010

José Zacarías Antonio Beletzuy (born 15 March 1982) is a Guatemalan football midfielder who currently plays for Deportivo Coatepeque of the Guatemalan second division.

== Club career ==
Antonio enjoyed successes with Xelajú MC, winning the 2006/2007 Clausura, before joining Coatepeque in 2009.

== International career ==
He made his debut for Guatemala in a July 2003 CONCACAF Gold Cup Finals match against Jamaica and has earned a total of 17 caps. He has represented his country in 1 FIFA World Cup qualification match and played at the 2005 UNCAF Nations Cup the 2003 and the 2005

His most recent international was a July 2005 Gold Cup match against South Africa.
