= Miguel Klee =

Guatemalan footballer

Miguel Ángel Klee
Personal information
- Full name: Miguel Ángel Klee Orellana
- Date of birth: 19 February 1977 (age 49)
- Place of birth: Guatemala
- Height: 1.75 m (5 ft 9 in)
- Position: Goalkeeper

Team information
- Current team: Rosario Quetzaltenango

Senior career*
Years	Team	Apps	(Gls)
2003–2007	Cobán Imperial	47	(0)
2007–2008	Deportivo Marquense		
2008–2009	Club Xelajú MC		
2009–2011	CD Suchitepéquez		
2011–2016	CD Malacateco		
2016–	Rosario Quetzaltenango		

International career^{‡}
2004–2005	Guatemala	21	(0)
- * Club domestic league appearances and goals as of October 29, 2008 ‡ National team caps and goals as of 15 February 2010

Miguel Ángel Klee Orellana (born 19 February 1977) is a Guatemalan professional football goalkeeper who plays for Rosario Quetzaltenango.

He is also a former member of the Guatemala national team.

== Club career ==
A rather short goalkeeper, Klee began his career with Cobán Imperial in 2003, and after one season with Deportivo Marquense, he joined Xelajú for the Apertura 2008-09 tournament. In 2009, he moved to Suchitepequez.

== International career ==
Klee has made 21 appearances for the full Guatemala national football team, his debut coming in a friendly against El Salvador on March 31, 2004. He represented his country in 7 FIFA World Cup qualification matches. and was selected as a reserve goalkeeper for the 2005 CONCACAF Gold Cup.

His final international was an October 2005 World Cup qualification match against Costa Rica.
