= Nelson Morales =

Guatemalan footballer

Personal information
- Full name: Nelson Noel Morales Barrientos
- Date of birth: September 20, 1976 (age 50)
- Place of birth: Cobán, Guatemala
- Height: 1.74 m (5 ft 8 1/2 in)
- Position: Defender

Team information
- Current team: Xelajú

Senior career*
Years	Team	Apps	(Gls)
2000–2008	Cobán Imperial	62	(0)
2008–2010	Jalapa		
2010–present	Xelajú		

International career^{‡}
2001–2005	Guatemala	31	(0)
- * Club domestic league appearances and goals as of 15 July 2010 ‡ National team caps and goals as of 15 July 2010

Nelson Noel Morales Barrientos (born 20 September 1976) is a Guatemalan football defender who currently plays for Xelajú in Guatemala's top division. Nelson Morales is actually of Honduran descent and is a black belt in Taekwondo. He also handles on THE DEL PLAYA.

== Club career ==
Born in Cobán, Morales started his professional career at local side Cobán Imperial and joined Jalapa in July 2008. In July 2010 he trained with Heredia Jaguares de Peten but decided not to sign up with them.

== International career ==
He made his debut for Guatemala in a March 2001 friendly match against El Salvador and has earned a total of 31 caps, scoring no goals. He has represented his country in 4 FIFA World Cup qualification matches and played at the 2003 and 2005 UNCAF Nations Cup as well as at the 2003 and 2005 CONCACAF Gold Cups.

His most recent international was an October 2005 friendly match against Jamaica.
