= Daurance Williams =

Trinidad and Tobago footballer

Personal information
- Full name: Daurance Lester Williams
- Date of birth: 13 May 1983 (age 43)
- Place of birth: Carenage, Trinidad and Tobago
- Height: 1.88 m (6 ft 2 in)
- Position: Goalkeeper

Senior career*
Years	Team	Apps	(Gls)
2001–2008	San Juan Jabloteh		
2009	Joe Public		
2010–2015	St. Ann's Rangers		

International career
2002–2008	Trinidad and Tobago	17	(0)
- * Club domestic league appearances and goals

Daurance Lester Williams (born 13 May 1983 in Carenage) is a retired Trinidadian football player. He played as a goalkeeper and retired on 1 July 2015.

== Career statistics ==
=== International ===
National team	Year	Apps	Goals
Trinidad and Tobago	2002	1	0
Trinidad and Tobago	2004	8	0
Trinidad and Tobago	2005	7	0
Trinidad and Tobago	2008	1	0
Total		17	0
