= Reagan Noble =

South African footballer

Personal information
- Full name: Peter Reagan Noble
- Date of birth: 22 July 1983 (age 43)
- Place of birth: Johannesburg, South Africa
- Height: 1.73 m (5 ft 8 in)
- Position: Midfielder

Team information
- Current team: University of Pretoria F.C.
- Number: 17

Senior career*
Years	Team	Apps	(Gls)
2002–2005	Wits University	42	(4)
2005–2007	Mamelodi Sundowns	1	(0)
2007	→Bloemfontein Celtic (loan)	3	(0)
2007–2008	Ikapa Sporting	16	(2)
2008–2010	AmaZulu	12	(0)
2011–	University of Pretoria F.C.	2	(0)

International career
2005	South Africa	4	(0)
- * Club domestic league appearances and goals

Reagan Noble (born 22 July 1983 in Johannesburg, Gauteng) is a South African footballer, who currently plays for University of Pretoria F.C.

== Career ==
The midfielder played previously for Wits University, Mamelodi Sundowns, Bloemfontein Celtic, Ikapa Sporting and AmaZulu in the Premier Soccer League.

== International career ==
He was a participant at the 2005 CONCACAF Gold Cup in the United States for South Africa.
