= César Valoyes =

Colombian footballer (born 1984)

Personal information
- Full name: César Augusto Valoyes Córdoba
- Date of birth: 5 January 1984 (age 42)
- Place of birth: Bahía Solano, Colombia
- Height: 1.74 m (5 ft 8 1/2 in)
- Position: Striker

Senior career*
| Years | Team | Apps | (Gls) |
| 2003–2007 | Independiente Medellín | 142 | (28) |
| 2008–2009 | Independiente Santa Fe | 33 | (5) |
| 2009 | Veracruz | 9 | (0) |
| 2009–2011 | Independiente Medellín | 40 | (4) |
| 2012 | Wuhan Zall | 10 | (1) |
| 2012 | Real Cartagena | 10 | (0) |
| 2013–14 | Atlético Huila | 31 | (1) |
| 2014 | UT Cajamarca | 15 | (7) |
| 2015 | Juan Aurich | 9 | (3) |
| 2016 | Ayacucho | 36 | (6) |
| 2017 | Patriotas Boyacá | 26 | (2) |
| 2018 | Club Deportivo Los Chankas | 25 | (4) |

International career
| 2005–2007 | Colombia | 4 | (1) |
- * Club domestic league appearances and goals as of April 21, 2013

César Augusto Valoyes Córdoba (Latin American Spanish: [ˈsesaɾ βaˈloʝes]; (Note: In isolation, Valoyes is pronounced [baˈloʝes].) born January 5, 1984) is a Colombian retired footballer who played as a striker.

He is known for his agility and speed; his short stature gave him a smaller center of gravity.

== Club career ==
Valoyes made his debut for Independiente Medellín in 2003. On 20 June 2004, Valoyes scored in the final minute of a 3–3 draw against Deportivo Cali to send the club into the 2004 Apertura finals against rivals Atletico Nacional, which Medellin later won for its fourth league title in history. In the 2005 Copa Libertadores, Valoyes scored twice in a 4-0 away victory against Athletico Paranaense at the Arena da Baixada. In 2008 he transferred to Santa Fe and left In December 2008 to join Veracruz, his first team outside the Colombian league. He made a couple appearances but after being notified that he was not part of coach Juan Antonio Luna's plans for the second semester of 2009, he returned to Independiente Medellin, where he was part of the squad that won the 2009 Finalizacion.

In 2012, he moved to Chinese club Wuhan Zall, but his spell at the club lasted less than a year. He then had spells at Real Cartagena and Atletico Huila, before making the move to Peru in 2014, joining UT Cajamarca in 2014. In 2015, he played for Juan Aurich, and in 2016 with Ayacucho. In 2017, he returned to Colombia and played with Patriotas Boyacá, before retiring in 2018 back in Peru at Los Chankas.

In 2021, he publicly declared that he had retired due to "mental health issues", specifically citing anxiety attacks whenever he played outside of Colombia.

== International career ==
Valoyes was part of the Colombia national football team in the 2007 Copa América.

== Honours ==
Independiente Medellín

- Categoría Primera A: 2004-I, 2009-II
