= Alain Cervantes =

Cuban footballer

Personal information
- Full name: Alain Alfredo Cervantes O'Farrill
- Date of birth: November 17, 1983 (age 42)
- Place of birth: Morón, Cuba
- Height: 1.67 m (5 ft 6 in)
- Position: Winger

Team information
- Current team: Ciego de Ávila

Senior career*
Years	Team	Apps	(Gls)
2002–	Ciego de Ávila		

International career^{‡}
2003–	Cuba	67	(8)
- * Club domestic league appearances and goals ‡ National team caps and goals as of 1 January 2018

Alain Alfredo Cervantes O'Farrill (born November 17, 1983) is a footballer from Cuba currently playing for FC Ciego de Ávila.

== Club career ==
The diminutive winger or attacking midfielder played his entire career for local side Ciego de Ávila.

== International career ==
He made his international debut for Cuba in a March 2003 friendly match against Jamaica and has earned a total of 67 caps, scoring 8 goals. He represented his country in 14 FIFA World Cup qualification matches and played at 5 CONCACAF Gold Cup final tournaments.

=== International goals ===
Scores and results list Cuba's goal tally first.

Number	Date	Location	Opponent	Score	Competition
1	20 June 2004	Estadio Alejandro Morera Soto, Alajuela, Costa Rica	Costa Rica	1-1	2006 FIFA World Cup qualification
2	21 December 2004	Stade d'Honneur de Dillon, Fort-de-France, Martinique	Martinique	2-0	2005 Caribbean Cup
3	11 December 2005	Gillette Stadium, Foxborough, United States	Canada	2-1	2005 CONCACAF Gold Cup
4	23 January 2007	Hasely Crawford Stadium, Port of Spain, Trinidad and Tobago	Guadeloupe	2-1	2007 Caribbean Cup
5	23 January 2007	Hasely Crawford Stadium, Port of Spain, Trinidad and Tobago	Guadeloupe	2-1	2007 Caribbean Cup
6	27 October 2008	Estadio Pedro Marrero, Havana, Cuba	Suriname	6-0	2008 Caribbean Cup qualification
7	27 October 2008	Estadio Pedro Marrero, Havana, Cuba	Suriname	6-0	2008 Caribbean Cup qualification
8	12 November 2010	Antigua Recreation Ground, St. John's, Antigua and Barbuda	Suriname	3-3	2010 Caribbean Cup qualification
