= Ángel Luis Rodríguez =

Panamanian footballer (born 1976)

Personal information
- Full name: Ángel Luis Rodríguez
- Date of birth: February 15, 1976 (age 50)
- Place of birth: Panama
- Height: 1.75 m (5 ft 9 in)
- Position: Midfielder

Youth career
- Nacional
- Independiente Santa Fe

Senior career*
Years	Team	Apps	(Gls)
1996	Ejecutivo Jrs.		
1997	San Francisco		
1998–2002	Tauro		
1999	→ FAS (loan)		
2003–2006	San Francisco		
2005	Santa Rita		
2006–2008	Sporting San Miguelito		
2002–2004	Árabe Unido		
2005–2008	Sporting San Miguelito		
2009–2011	Árabe Unido		

International career^{‡}
1995–2010	Panama	59	(3)
- * Club domestic league appearances and goals ‡ National team caps and goals as of 15 August 2015

Ángel Luis Rodríguez (born 15 February 1976) is a retired Panamanian football midfielder.

== Club career ==
Pito Rodríguez played in the youth teams of Uruguayan giants Nacional and Colombian outfit Independiente Santa Fe and started his senior career at Ejecutivo Jrs., played for San Francisco and Tauro and returned to San Francisco in December 2002. While at Tauro, he went to Italy for a trial with Empoli in 1998.

He had a spell abroad on loan at Salvadoran side FAS in 1999, but left the club citing urgent family matters while denying any involvement in a Salvadoran road accident in which a person died and subsequently fleeing Salvadoran law. In summer 2005, he went to play alongside compatriot Juan Carlos Cubillas for Ecuadoran second division team Santa Rita.

He also played for Sporting San Miguelito and Árabe Unido, whom he joined a second time in summer 2009 from Sporting.

He retired in July 2011.

== International career ==
He played for the Panama U23 team in the 1997 Central American Games.

Rodríguez made his debut for Panama in a January 1995 UNCAF Nations Cup match against Nicaragua and has earned a total of 59 caps, scoring 3 goals. He represented his country in 18 FIFA World Cup qualification matches and was a member of the 2005 CONCACAF Gold Cup team, who finished second in the tournament.

His final international was a January 2010 friendly match against Chile.

=== International goals ===
Scores and results list Panama's goal tally first.

#	Date	Venue	Opponent	Score	Result	Competition
1	12 October 1999	Estadio Rommel Fernández, Panama City, Panama	Trinidad and Tobago	1–0	2–2	Friendly match
2	22 June 2000	Estadio Rommel Fernández, Panama City, Panama	Venezuela	1–0	2–0	Friendly match
3	24 April 2001	Estadio Rommel Fernández, Panama City, Panama	Haiti	2–0	2–0	Friendly match

== Managerial career ==
After retiring as a player in July 2011, Rodríguez was named assistant to manager Jair Palacios at Árabe Unido. He was appointed coach of Árabe Unido Reserves in summer 2014.

== Honours ==
Panama

- CONCACAF Gold Cup runner-up: 2005
