= Tressor Moreno =

Colombian footballer (born 1979)

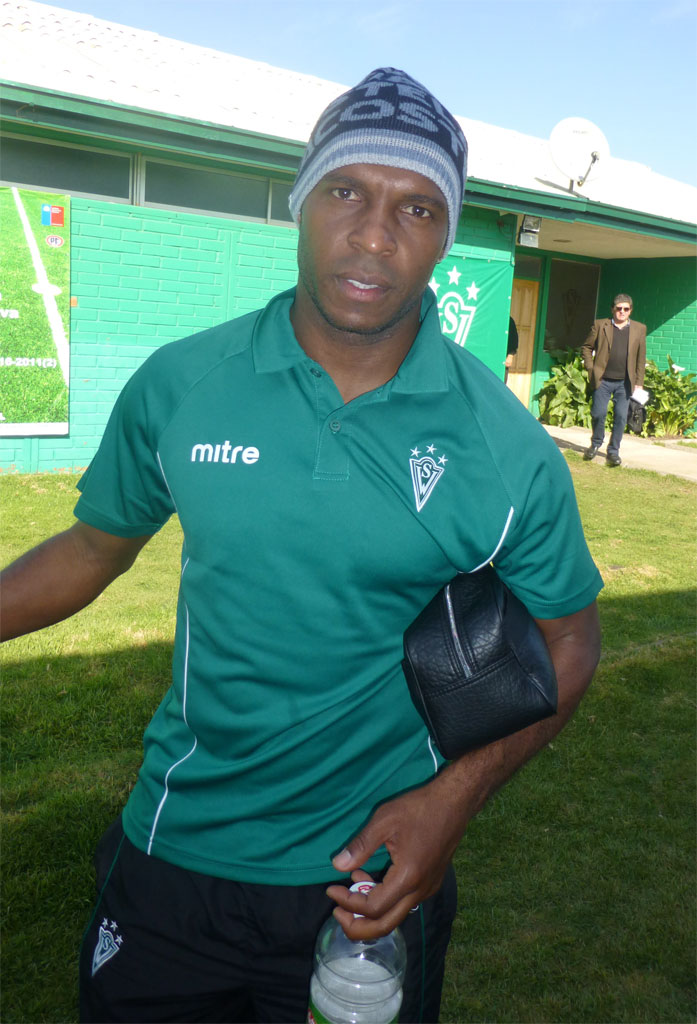
- Moreno in 2012

Personal information
- Full name: Malher Tressor Moreno Baldrich
- Date of birth: 11 January 1979 (age 47)
- Place of birth: Riosucio, Colombia
- Height: 1.76 m (5 ft 9 in)
- Position: Attacking midfielder

Youth career
- Tuluá

Senior career*
Years	Team	Apps	(Gls)
1999	Alianza Lima	40	(16)
2000	Atlético Nacional	34	(11)
2000–2004	Metz	39	(2)
2002	→ América de Cali (loan)	14	(5)
2002–2003	→ Medellín (loan)	35	(9)
2004	Deportivo Cali	16	(4)
2005	Once Caldas	15	(3)
2005–2006	Necaxa	29	(5)
2006	Veracruz	30	(8)
2007–2010	San Luis	89	(16)
2010	Medellín	19	(3)
2011–2012	Santiago Wanderers	23	(1)
2012	→ San Jose Earthquakes (loan)	12	(0)
2013	Atlético Huila	14	(5)
2013	Atlético Junior	16	(0)
2014	Itagüí	15	(2)
2014	Fortaleza	10	(1)
2015	Celaya	22	(2)
2016	Nacional-AM	0	(0)

International career
2000–2008	Colombia	31	(7)
- * Club domestic league appearances and goals as of 29 July 2016

Malher Tressor Moreno Baldrich (born 11 January 1979) is a Colombian former professional footballer who played as an attacking midfielder.

== Club career ==
Named after classical music composer Gustav Mahler and famed French Footballer Marius Trésor, Tressor Moreno began his career in the youth ranks of Colombia's Tuluá.

In 1998, he emigrated to Peru and made his professional debut with Peruvian powerhouse Alianza Lima. There he appeared in 40 league matches and scored 16 goals, forming a formidable front line with Claudio Pizarro as Alianza finished league runner-up. During his time with the Peruvian club Moreno was regarded as one of the best foreign players to have played in Peru.

In 2000, he returned to Colombia, joining Atlético Nacional and having another productive season where he appeared in 34 league matches and scored 11 times. On 9 November 2000, Moreno scored in the second leg of the Merconorte finals, as Nacional beat rivals Millonarios 2–1 to lift the 2000 Copa Merconorte trophy. As a result of his play with Nacional, Moreno began to draw interest from European clubs and in 2000 was sold to Metz in France.

In 2002, Metz loaned him to América de Cali, where he helped the club to the 2002 Apertura title with 5 goals in 14 appearances.

For the 2002 Finalización season Moreno was loaned to Independiente Medellín and helped his new club capture the Finalización title, scoring 4 goals across the title-winning campaign. He also played the 2003 Apertura and the 2003 Copa Libertadores with El Poderoso. In the Copa Libertadores, his club reached the semi-finals, with Moreno scoring three goals in the group stage, two against Barcelona and one against Colo-Colo, and scored the opening goal of the semi-finals second leg, a 3–2 loss to Santos at Estadio Atanasio Girardot.

Moreno returned to France for the 2003–04 season, and although he did not have much success with Metz he did help the club avoid relegation. Once his contract with Metz ended he returned to Colombia and played with Deportivo Cali for the 2004 season, where he scored a goal in a 3–3 draw in the playoffs against his old club Independiente Medellin on 20 June 2004. For the 2005 Apertura he played with Once Caldas.

In July 2005, he began his career in Mexico joining Club Necaxa. He was an important player for Necaxa during the 2005–06 season appearing in 29 matches and scoring 5 goals. The following season he would join Veracruz and had another fine season appearing in 30 league matches and scoring 8 goals.

In 2007, he would join San Luis and enjoy unprecedented success with the club helping them to a Copa Sudamericana birth in 2008 and a Copa Libertadores birth in 2009. While with San Luis, Moreno appeared in 89 league matches and scored 16 goals, including a brace against Tecos in the 2007 Apertura. In January 2010 Chacarita Juniors was close to signing the Colombian attacking midfielder on loan from San Luis, but the move finally did not materialize and Moreno joined Independiente Medellín for the 2010 league season, 2010 Copa Colombia, and 2010 Copa Libertadores.

He joined Bahia of the Campeonato Brasileiro Série A on 8 February 2011. He scored his first goal for the club, a penalty, in a Campeonato Baiano victory against Ipitanga. However, towards the final stages of the state league, Moreno would play less each time, and eventually he was dropped from the squad, never appearing for the club in the Campeonato Brasileiro. Moreno's spell at the club ended with 10 appearances and 1 goal.

In August 2011 signed with Chilean club Santiago Wanderers.

Moreno was loaned out to San Jose Earthquakes of Major League Soccer on 2 February 2012. On 9 July 2012, after requesting more playing time and being second choice to Rafael Baca, the club's board decided to terminate his contract, and the previous day he stated on Twitter that he was "traveling to Chile for a new stage". He returned to Wanderers shortly after, but left at the end of 2012.

In January 2013, he went back to Colombia and joined Atlético Huila, scoring 5 times in 14 appearances, including a hat-trick and an assist in a 6–1 win over Deportivo Pasto. Six months later in July, he moved to Barranquilla and joined Junior. At the end of the year, he was on the move again, having failed to impress at Junior.

In 2014 he played for Itagui, and joined Fortaleza for the second half of the year.

In 2015 he played for Celaya.

In 2016 he joined Nacional-AM, a club based in Manaus, in the Campeonato Brasileiro Série C.

In 2017, he joined Deportivo Hualgayoc in the Peruvian Liga 2, coached by Moreno's 1999 Alianza Lima teammate José Soto. where he played 5 matches and scored 2 goals.

== International career ==
On 25 July 2000, Moreno debuted with Colombia in a 2002 World Cup qualifier against Ecuador.

He played with Colombia at the 2004 Copa América, scoring two goals, and at the 2005 CONCACAF Gold Cup, scoring once. He was also included in the Best XI of the tournament, as Colombia exited in the semi-finals, losing to Panama. On 8 June 2005, Moreno scored twice in a 3–0 victory against Ecuador.

=== International goals ===
Scores and results list Colombia's goal tally first.

International goals by date, venue, opponent, and competition
#	Date	Venue	Opponent	Score	Result	Competition
1	6 June 2004	Estadio Metropolitano Roberto Meléndez, Barranquilla, Colombia	Uruguay	2–0	5–0	2006 World Cup Qualification
2	7 July 2004	Estadio Nacional, Lima, Peru	Venezuela	1–0	1–0	2004 Copa América
3	17 July 2004	Estadio Mansiche, Trujillo, Peru	Costa Rica	2–0	2–0	2004 Copa América
4	8 June 2005	Estadio Metropolitano Roberto Meléndez, Barranquilla, Colombia	Ecuador	1–0	3–0	2006 FIFA World Cup Qualification
5	8 June 2005	Estadio Metropolitano Roberto Meléndez, Barranquilla, Colombia	Ecuador	2–0	3–0	2006 FIFA World Cup Qualification
6	10 July 2005	Orange Bowl, Miami, United States	Honduras	1–0	1–2	2005 Gold Cup

== Honours ==
=== Club ===
- Atlético Nacional
  - Copa Merconorte: 2000
- América de Cali
  - Categoría Primera A: 2002-I
- Independiente Medellín
  - Categoría Primera A: 2002-II

=== Individual ===
- CONCACAF Gold Cup Best XI: 2005
