= Stanley Kgatla =

South African soccer player

Personal information
- Full name: Mathafane Stanley Kgatla
- Date of birth: 13 September 1982 (age 44)
- Place of birth: Tzaneen, South Africa
- Height: 1.67 m (5 ft 6 in)
- Positions: Central midfielder; defensive midfielder

Youth career
- Winners Park

Senior career*
Years	Team	Apps	(Gls)
2003–2011	Platinum Stars	202	(1)
2011–2013	AmaZulu	47	(1)
2013–2014	Mpumalanga Black Aces	1	(0)
2014–2016	Highlands Park	12	(0)

International career
2005	South Africa	1	(0)
- * Club domestic league appearances and goals

Stanley Kgatla (born 13 September 1982) is a South African former soccer player who played as a midfielder for Premier Soccer League clubs and South Africa.
