= Lucky Lekgwathi =

South African soccer player

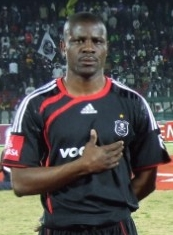

Personal information
- Full name: Lucky Lehlohonolo Lekgwathi
- Date of birth: 1 August 1976 (age 50)
- Place of birth: Ga-Rankuwa, South Africa
- Height: 1.78 m (5 ft 10 in)
- Position: Defender

Youth career
- 1987–1997: Soshanguve Dan Masters

Senior career*
Years	Team	Apps	(Gls)
1997–1999	Real Rovers	9	(0)
1999–2002	Ria Stars	61	(3)
2002–2014	Orlando Pirates	321	(11)

International career
2002–2005	South Africa	14	(0)
- * Club domestic league appearances and goals as of 17 August 2013

Lucky Lekgwathi (born 1 August 1976 in Ga-Rankuwa, Gauteng) is a retired South African football defender who played and captained Orlando Pirates. He played for South Africa at the 2005 CONCACAF Gold Cup, at which South Africa were guests.

He is arguably Orlando Pirates most successful captain, having captained them to six major trophies in 2 seasons (2010/10 & 2011/12) making Pirates the only Double Treble Champions since the formation of the PSL. He was very instrumental in ending Orlando Pirates' 8-year league drought, scoring crucial goals in the process, most notably a winner against Supersport United.

Many supporters referred to him as “Captain, my Captain,” a phrase likely echoing Walt Whitman’s poem O Captain! My Captain!. During the 2010/11 and 2011/12 seasons, the club captain played a central role in Orlando Pirates’ domestic success, contributing to their back-to-back league dominance. As an experienced defender, he was regarded as a steady presence within the squad and a point of guidance for younger teammates.

Among his notable moments was a diving header against Lamontville Golden Arrows F.C. in Durban in the final match of the 2011 season, a result that confirmed the league title. He also scored in an away fixture against SuperSport United during the same campaign, contributing to a win that proved important in the title run. He remained part of the squad during the club’s run to the final of the CAF Champions League in 2013.

At international level, he earned 13 caps for the South Africa national soccer team. His debut for Pirates came in a 5–0 victory over Moroka Swallows on 10 August 2002 in the BP Top 8.

== Career statistics ==
=== International ===
Appearances and goals by national team and year
National team	Year	Apps	Goals
South Africa	2002	1	0
South Africa	2003	4	0
South Africa	2004	1	0
South Africa	2005	8	0
Total		14	0

== Honours ==
Orlando Pirates

- Premier Soccer league: 2002 - 2003, 2010 - 11, 2011 - 2012
- MTN8 Cup/SAA Supa 8: 2009 - 2010, 2010 - 2011
- Nedbank Cup: 2010 - 2011, 2013 - 2014
- Telkom Cup: 2008 - 2009
- CAF Champions League runner - up: 2012 - 2013
- CAF Confederation Cup runner - up: 2014 - 2015

Ria Stars

- PSL promotion: 1999 - 2000

South Africa

- COSAFA Cup: 2002

Individual

Orlando Pirates Most Improved Player of the Season: 2006 - 2007
