= Siyabonga Siphika =

South African soccer player

Personal information
- Date of birth: 24 April 1981 (age 45)
- Place of birth: South Africa
- Position: Midfielder

Senior career*
Years	Team	Apps	(Gls)
2000–2003	Bush Bucks	50	(3)
2003–2005	Manning Rangers	45	(3)
2005	IFK Norrköping	9	(0)
2005–2008	Maritzburg United	16	(1)
2008–2010	Vasco da Gama	?	(?)
Total		120	(7)

International career
2005	South Africa	5	(0)
- * Club domestic league appearances and goals

Siyabonga Siphika (born 24 April 1981) is a South African former soccer player who played at both professional and international levels as a midfielder.

== Career ==
Siphika played club football for Bush Bucks, Manning Rangers, IFK Norrköping, Maritzburg United and Vasco da Gama; he also earned five caps for the South African national side in 2005.
