= Lebohang Mokoena =

South African footballer

Personal information
- Full name: Lebohang Lefalamang Paul Mokoena
- Date of birth: 29 September 1986 (age 40)
- Place of birth: Soweto, South Africa
- Height: 1.73 m (5 ft 8 in)
- Positions: Winger; forward

Youth career
- Kliptown helenic
- Orlando Pirates

Senior career*
Years	Team	Apps	(Gls)
2003–2009	Orlando Pirates	98	(13)
2009–2016	Mamelodi Sundowns	80	(10)
2016–2017	Cape Town Spurs	6	(0)
2018–2022	Moroka Swallows	102	(8)

International career
2005–2012	South Africa	8	(0)
- * Club domestic league appearances and goals as of 21:22, 9 January 2020 (UTC)

Lebohang Mokoena (born 29 September 1986) is a South African former soccer player who played as a winger or forward.

Mokoena is known for his pace and dribbling ability, and is most commonly found playing upfront or on the right wing. He has no relation with former Blackburn Rovers player Aaron Mokoena. He is also extremely famous for being featured on Football Manager 2005 as a high potential and relatively cheap signing.

== Early beginnings ==
Mokoena started playing football at the age of eight, playing football in the streets of his birthplace, Diepkloof in Soweto.

While growing up, Mokoena excelled in other sports athletics. He had a keen interest in sprinting and broke records in the 100, 200 and 800 meter events at Fordsburg Primary School. Mokoena began playing football for his local team Diepkloof Hellenic.

== Career ==
Mokoena's arrival into the professional ranks was promoted to the first team at the age of seventeen. He made his PSL debut coming on as a substitute in the 2–2 draw away to Santos on 1 November 2003, going on to play twenty-four matches in that season, starting eleven and coming off the bench thirteen times; he netted five goals.

In the next season (2004–05), his efforts were rewarded when he won the club's Most Improved Player of the Year award.

In 2006 Lebohang was promoted to Orlando Pirates senior team where he spent three seasons, before moving to Pretoria side Mamelodi Sundowns. Mokoena currently plays for Moroka Swallows F.C. and he is also their captain.

== National career ==
Mokoena is one of a few young players in the country who has the record of having represented his nation at all levels starting with the Under-17 (14 caps), U-20 (2 caps) and he was a regular figure, and one of the top goal scorers, in the U-23 squad.

"Cheeseboy", as he is nicknamed, made his international debut in a 2–1 win against Mexico during the CONCACAF Gold Cup in the United States on 8 July 2005.

== Career statistics ==
As of match played 1 June 2022

Appearances and goals by club, season and competition
Club	Season	League			National cup		League cup		Other		Total	
Club	Season	Division	Apps	Goals	Apps	Goals	Apps	Goals	Apps	Goals	Apps	Goals
Orlando Pirates	2003–04	Premier Soccer League	Information not available									
Orlando Pirates	2004–05	Premier Soccer League	Information not available									
Orlando Pirates	2005–06	Premier Soccer League	Information not available									
Orlando Pirates	2006–07	Premier Soccer League	Information not available									
Orlando Pirates	2007–08	Premier Soccer League	Information not available									
Orlando Pirates	2008–09	Premier Soccer League	Information not available									
Orlando Pirates	Total		—									
Mamelodi Sundowns	2009–10	Premier Soccer League	22	4	0	0	0	0	0	0	22	4
Mamelodi Sundowns	2010–11	Premier Soccer League	15	2	0	0	0	0	0	0	15	2
Mamelodi Sundowns	2011–12	Premier Soccer League	23	2	3	3	0	0	2 (Note: Appearance(s) in MTN 8)	0	28	5
Mamelodi Sundowns	2012–13	Premier Soccer League	2	0	0	0	0	0	2	1	4	1
Mamelodi Sundowns	2013–14	Premier Division	13	2	2	1	0	0	0	0	15	3
Mamelodi Sundowns	2014–15	Premier Division	2	0	0	0	1	0	0	0	3	0
Mamelodi Sundowns	2015–16	Premier Division	3	0	0	0	0	0	0	0	3	0
Mamelodi Sundowns	Total		80	10	5	4	1	0	4	1	90	15
Cape Town Spurs	2016–17	Premier Division	6	0	0	0	0	0	0	0	6	0
Moroka Swallows	2018–19	National First Division	25	3	0	0	0	0	0	0	25	3
Moroka Swallows	2019–20	National First Division	29	4	1	1	0	0	0	0	30	5
Moroka Swallows	2020–21	Premier Division	28	0	1	0	0	0	0	0	29	0
Moroka Swallows	2021–22	Premier Division	20	1	1	0	0	0	3 (Note: Two appearances in MTN 8; one appearance in National First Division play-offs)	0	24	1
Moroka Swallows	Total		102	8	3	1	0	0	3	0	108	9
Career total			188	18	8	5	1	0	7	1	204	24
