= Shawn Sawyers =

Jamaican footballer (born 1976)

Personal information
- Full name: Shawn Sawyers
- Date of birth: 19 September 1976 (age 50)
- Place of birth: Jamaica
- Height: 6 ft 2 in (1.88 m)
- Position: Goalkeeper

Team information
- Current team: Humble Lions F.C.

Senior career*
Years	Team	Apps	(Gls)
- Braeton F.C.
1997–2002	Hazard United		
2003–2009	Portmore United		
2010–2011	Humble Lions F.C.		

International career^{‡}
2002–2009	Jamaica	23	(0)
- * Club domestic league appearances and goals as of 24 December 2007 ‡ National team caps and goals as of 22 August 2008

Shawn Sawyers (born 19 September 1976) is a Jamaican professional football player who plays as a goalkeeper, in 2010 he transferred from Portmore United to Humble Lions F.C. in the Jamaica National Premier League.

== International career ==
Sawyers made his debut for Jamaica in a May 2002 friendly match against Nigeria, coming on as a substitute for Aaron Lawrence. He has served as the long-time number two keeper for Jamaica. He has collected 29 caps since, his last international match being the February 2009 in a friendly match in London versus Nigeria.

== Honors ==
=== Portmore United ===
- CFU Club Championship: 1

2005

- Jamaica National Premier League: 3

2003, 2005, 2008

- JFF Champions Cup: 4

2000, 2003, 2005, 2007

=== Jamaica ===
- Caribbean Cup: 1

2005
