= Thabang Stemmer =

South African soccer player

Personal information
- Date of birth: 18 August 1979 (age 47)
- Place of birth: Soweto, South Africa
- Height: 1.76 m (5 ft 9 1/2 in)
- Position: Goalkeeper

Senior career*
Years	Team	Apps	(Gls)
2000–2005	Orlando Pirates	33	(0)
2005–2006	Mabopane Young Masters	0	(0)
2006–2007	Black Leopards	5	(0)
2007–2008	SuperSport United	0	(0)
2008–2013	Bloemfontein Celtic	14	(0)

International career
2005	South Africa	1	(0)
- * Club domestic league appearances and goals

Thabang Stemmer (born 18 August 1979) is an ex South African international footballer who last played for Bloemfontein Celtic, as a goalkeeper.

== Career ==
Stemmer has previously played club football with Orlando Pirates, Mabopane Young Masters, Black Leopards and SuperSport United.

Stemmer made his international debut for South Africa in 2005.

Stemmer was previously known as Thabang Radebe.
