= Craig Bianchi =

South African football defender

Personal information
- Full name: Craig Bianchi
- Date of birth: 25 March 1978 (age 48)
- Place of birth: Cape Town, South Africa
- Height: 1.83 m (6 ft 0 in)
- Position: Central defender

Youth career
- Hellenic

Senior career*
| Years | Team | Apps | (Gls) |
| 1994–2002 | Hellenic | ? | (?) |
| 2002–2006 | Mamelodi Sundowns | 58 | (1) |
| 2006 | → Maritzburg United (loan) | 10 | (0) |
| 2006–2011 | Engen Santos | 28 | (0) |
| 2012–2013 | Hellenic | ? | (?) |

International career^{‡}
| 2001–2005 | South Africa | 7 | (0) |
- * Club domestic league appearances and goals as of 1 August 2009 ‡ National team caps and goals as of 1 August 2009

Craig Bianchi (born 25 March 1978 in Cape Town, Western Cape) is a South African football (soccer) defender who played for Hellenic. He made 7 appearances for South Africa national team.

Bianchi hails from Elsie's River on the Cape Flats. He made his senior debut as a 16-year-old in 1994.
