= Gift Leremi =

South African soccer player

Personal information
- Full name: Mpho Gift Leremi
- Date of birth: 13 October 1984
- Place of birth: Soweto, South Africa
- Date of death: 3 September 2007 (aged 22)
- Place of death: Alberton, South Africa
- Height: 1.75 m (5 ft 9 in)
- Position: Midfielder

Youth career
- Sprinters Development Soccer Academy
- Orlando Pirates

Senior career*
Years	Team	Apps	(Gls)
2002–2007	Orlando Pirates	70	(15)
2007	Mamelodi Sundowns	2	(1)

International career^{‡}
2001–2004	South Africa U23	21	(0)
2004–2005	South Africa	4	(0)
- * Club domestic league appearances and goals as of July, 2007 ‡ National team caps and goals as of July, 2007

Mpho Gift Leremi (13 October 1984 – 3 September 2007) was a South African football midfielder who last played for Mamelodi Sundowns in the Premier Soccer League, and South Africa. Leremi died in a car crash on 3 September 2007 near Johannesburg, South Africa.

== Career ==
Leremi was an offensive midfielder who began his career with the youth club Pimville Giants in Soweto, where he was born, and discovered by Orlando Pirates in 1999 at a local soccer tournament. Upon joining the Pirates development team, Augusto Palacios, the Pirates youth director, immediately recognized the talent in the player and took him under his wing.

Leremi made his debut for Orlando Pirates in 2002–03 season of the Premier Soccer League on 10 August 2002 against Moroka Swallows, winning the league title in his debut season.

In the summer of 2007 he moved to the then Premier Soccer League champions Mamelodi Sundowns.

== Death ==
On 3 September 2007, Leremi was returning home after a CAF Confederation Cup game in Cameroon against Astres FC when he was involved in a traffic collision in Alberton outside Johannesburg. He sustained massive injuries and ultimately died as a result of the accident.
