= Peter Petersen (soccer) =

South African soccer player

Personal information
- Full name: Peter Patrick Petersen
- Date of birth: 27 February 1981 (age 45)
- Place of birth: Cape Town, South Africa
- Height: 1.82 m (6 ft 0 in)
- Position: Right-back

Youth career
- Hellenic

Senior career*
| Years | Team | Apps | (Gls) |
| 1998–2001 | Hellenic | 32 | (2) |
| 2001–2006 | Moroka Swallows | 77 | (2) |
| 2006–2007 | FC AK | 14 | (1) |
| 2007–2014 | Maritzburg United | 124 | (0) |
| Total | | 247 | (5) |

International career
| 2005 | South Africa | 2 | (0) |
- * Club domestic league appearances and goals

Peter Patrick Petersen (born 27 February 1981) is a South African former soccer player who played as a defender. He was capped twice by South Africa.
