= Phil Evans (soccer, born 1980) =

South African footballer (born 1980)

Personal information
- Full name: Philip Gareth Evans
- Date of birth: 12 July 1980 (age 46)
- Place of birth: Cardiff, Wales
- Height: 1.85 m (6 ft 1 in)
- Positions: Right-back; defensive midfielder

Senior career*
Years	Team	Apps	(Gls)
1998–1999	Arcadia Shepherds	21	(5)
1999–2006	Supersport United	128	(11)
2006–2009	Bidvest Wits	50	(0)
2009–2010	Thanda Royal Zulu	11	(1)

International career^{‡}
2003–2005	South Africa	10	(1)
- * Club domestic league appearances and goals as of 2 May 2010 ‡ National team caps and goals as of 2 May 2010

Phillip Gareth Evans (born 12 July 1980) is a professional footballer player who played as a defender and defensive midfielder. Born in Wales, he played for the South Africa national team. Evans last played for Thanda Royal Zulu.

Evans, playing for Supersport United, scored the only goal in their win over Kaizer Chiefs in the SAA Supa 8 2004 final.

== International goals ==
He made 10 appearances for South Africa national team from 2003 to 2005 and scored one goal, which came on 7 August 2005 in a 1–2 defeat against Mexico in Carson, California, during the 2005 CONCACAF Gold Cup.

#	Date	Venue	Opponent	Score	Result	Competition
1	2005-07-08	Carson, United States	Mexico	1-0	2-1	CONCACAF Gold Cup

== Honours ==
=== Individual ===
- CONCACAF Gold Cup Best XI (Honorable Mention): 2005
