= Lungisani Ndlela =

South African soccer player

Personal information
- Full name: Lungisani Lionel Ndlela
- Date of birth: 8 September 1980 (age 46)
- Place of birth: Frankfort, South Africa
- Height: 2.00 m (6 ft 6 1/2 in)
- Position: Striker

Youth career
- Sporting Spades
- Real Rangers
- Maritzburg City

Senior career*
Years	Team	Apps	(Gls)
2000–2003	Pretoria University		
2003–2004	Moroka Swallows	19	(8)
2004–2006	Supersport United	25	(4)
2006–2009	Mamelodi Sundowns	23	(2)
2009–2010	Moroka Swallows	19	(3)
2010–2011	United FC		

International career^{‡}
2005–2006	South Africa	9	(3)
- * Club domestic league appearances and goals as of 13 September 2009 ‡ National team caps and goals as of 13 September 2009

Lungisani Ndlela (born 8 September 1980 in Frankfort, Free State) is a South African Association football striker for Premier Soccer League club Moroka Swallows and South Africa. Standing at 2.00m, he is one of the tallest players in world football.

== Career statistics ==
=== International goals ===
#	Date	Venue	Opponent	Score	Result	Competition
1.	10 July 2005	Memorial Coliseum, Los Angeles, United States	Jamaica	3–3	Draw	2005 CONCACAF Gold Cup
2.	17 July 2005	Reliant Stadium, Houston, United States	Panama	1–1	Draw	2005 CONCACAF Gold Cup
3.	13 August 2005	Mmabatho Stadium, Mafikeng, South Africa	Zambia	2–2	Draw	2005 COSAFA Cup
Correct as of 9 March 2017
