= Siyabonga Nkosi =

South African footballer

Personal information
- Full name: Siyabonga Solace Nkosi
- Date of birth: 22 August 1981 (age 45)
- Place of birth: Newcastle, KwaZulu-Natal, South Africa
- Height: 1.83 m (6 ft 0 in)
- Position: Attacking midfielder

Youth career
- Riverview Spurs
- Greenpoint Vultures
- 2001–2003: Orlando Pirates

Senior career*
Years	Team	Apps	(Gls)
2003–2006	Bloemfontein Celtic	52	(12)
2006–2007	Kaizer Chiefs	26	(4)
2007–2008	Arminia Bielefeld	9	(0)
2009	Maccabi Netanya	15	(1)
2009–2010	Supersport United	15	(1)
2010–2012	Golden Arrows	47	(9)
2012–2015	Kaizer Chiefs	27	(6)
Total		192	(23)

International career
2005–2009	South Africa	26	(2)
- * Club domestic league appearances and goals

Siyabonga Nkosi (born 22 August 1981) is a South African former soccer player who played as an attacking midfielder.

== International goals ==
#	Date	Venue	Opponent	Score	Result	Competition
1	13 July 2005	Houston, United States	Guatemala	1–0	1–1	2005 CONCACAF Gold Cup
2	19 August 2008	London, England	Australia	1–0	2–2	Friendly match

== Honours ==
- Telkom Knockout Cup: 2007
- Premier Soccer League: 2009–10
- Premier Soccer League: 2012–13
- Nedbank Cup: 2013
- Carling Black Label Cup: 2013
