= Ricardo Katza =

South African soccer player

Personal information
- Full name: Ricardo Katza
- Date of birth: 12 March 1978 (age 48)
- Place of birth: Cape Town, South Africa
- Height: 1.85 m (6 ft 1 in)
- Positions: Central defender; left-back

Senior career*
Years	Team	Apps	(Gls)
1998–1999	Seven Stars	12	(1)
1999–2003	Hellenic	98	(7)
2003–2012	Supersport United	158	(17)

International career^{‡}
2005–2007	South Africa	19	(0)
- * Club domestic league appearances and goals as of 17 June 2012 ‡ National team caps and goals as of 17 June 2012

Ricardo Katza (born 12 March 1978) is a South African former soccer player who played as a defender.

Katza made 19 appearances for the South Africa national football team.
