= Abram Raselemane =

South African footballer

Personal information
- Full name: Abram Melato Raselemane
- Date of birth: 23 March 1978
- Place of birth: Thaba Nchu, South Africa
- Date of death: 27 May 2008 (aged 30)
- Place of death: Bloemfontein, South Africa
- Height: 1.80 m (5 ft 11 in)
- Position: Striker

Senior career*
Years	Team	Apps	(Gls)
1998–1999	Bloemfontein Young Tigers	25	(11)
1999–2001	Santos Cape Town	62	(13)
2001–2006	Supersport United	104	(42)
2006–2008	Bidvest Wits	24	(2)

International career^{‡}
2001–2006	South Africa	15	(3)
- * Club domestic league appearances and goals as of 27 May 2008 ‡ National team caps and goals as of 27 May 2008

Abram Melato "Fire" Raselemane (23 March 1978, in Thaba Nchu – 27 May 2008, in Bloemfontein) was a South African soccer player who played as a striker.

Initially rising to prominence in 1999 while playing for Bloemfontein Young Tigers, he later played for Supersport United and Santos Cape Town before joining Wits in 2006. Between 2002 and 2006, he was capped 15 times by South Africa, scoring 3 goals.

Raselmane died on 27 May 2008 from suicide.

== Career statistics ==
=== International goals ===
#	Date	Venue	Opponent	Score	Result	Competition
1.	8 October 2003	Setsoto Stadium, Maseru, Lesotho	Lesotho	0–3	Win	Friendly
2.	10 July 2005	Memorial Coliseum, Los Angeles, United States	Jamaica	3–3	Draw	2005 CONCACAF Gold Cup
3.	13 August 2005	Mmabatho Stadium, Mafikeng, South Africa	Zambia	2–2	Draw	2005 COSAFA Cup
Correct as of 9 March 2017
