= 2005 CONCACAF Gold Cup =

8th edition of the CONCACAF Gold Cup

CONCACAF Championship
- 2005 CONCACAF Gold Cup official logo

Tournament details
- Host country: United States
- Dates: July 6–24
- Teams: 12 (from 3 confederations)
- Venues: 7 (in 7 host cities)

Final positions
- Champions: United States (3rd title)
- Runners-up: Panama

Tournament statistics
- Matches played: 25
- Goals scored: 73 (2.92 per match)
- Attendance: 340,018 (13,601 per match)
- Top scorer(s): (United States) DaMarcus Beasley (United States) Landon Donovan (Guatemala) Carlos Ruiz (Panama) Luis Tejada (Honduras) Wilmer Velásquez (3 goals each)
- Best player: (Panama) Luis Tejada
- Best goalkeeper: (Panama) Jaime Penedo
- Fair play award: Honduras

The 2005 CONCACAF Gold Cup was the eighth edition of the Gold Cup, the soccer championship of North America, Central America and the Caribbean (CONCACAF). It was contested in the United States in July 2005. The United States emerged victorious in the final against an upstart Panama team led by tournament MVP Luis Tejada. After regulation and 30 minutes of extra time ended scoreless, the U.S. won 3–1 on penalties.

For this edition, the format was switched from four groups of three teams each to the three groups of four teams. As a result, there was one more group stage game for each team, and the likelihood of teams advancing on a coin toss was much less. The top two teams from each group and the two best third-place teams would advance to the quarterfinals.

As usual for the Gold Cup, several of the top teams fielded less than their top squads, including guest teams Colombia and South Africa. Mexico and the United States were missing at least half their usual starters, and a few top name players on smaller nations (Paulo Wanchope and Amado Guevara, among others) also declined to participate. During the tournament, matches in Miami's Group A had to be postponed because of Hurricane Dennis.

This was the last edition of the tournament to have guest participants from other confederations until the 2021 CONCACAF Gold Cup.

== Qualified teams ==
Team	Qualification	Appearances	Last appearance	Previous best performance	FIFA Ranking
North American zone
Mexico (TH)	Automatic	8th	2003	Champions (1993, 1996, 1998, 2003)	6
United States	Automatic	8th	2003	Champions (1991, 2002)	10
Canada	Automatic	7th	2003	Champions (2000)	85
Caribbean zone qualified through the 2005 Caribbean Cup
Jamaica	Winners	6th	2003	Third place (1993)	41
Cuba	Runners-up	4th	2003	Quarterfinals (2003)	70
Trinidad and Tobago	Third Place	6th	2002	Third place (2000)	58
Central American zone qualified through the 2005 UNCAF Nations Cup
Costa Rica	Winners	7th	2003	Runners-up (2002)	24
Honduras	Runners-up	7th	2003	Runners-up (1991)	50
Guatemala	Third Place	7th	2003	Fourth Place (1996)	59
Panama	Fourth Place	2nd	1993	Group stage (1993)	98
Other
South Africa	Invitation	1st	None	Debut	39
Colombia	Invitation	3rd	2000	Runners-up (2000)	25

== Venues ==
Foxborough	East Rutherford	Carson	Los Angeles
Gillette Stadium	Giants Stadium	Home Depot Center	Los Angeles Memorial Coliseum
Capacity: 68,756	Capacity: 80,042	Capacity: 27,000	Capacity: 93,607
Miami	Seattle	Houston	
Orange Bowl	Qwest Field	Reliant Stadium	
Capacity: 72,319	Capacity: 67,000	Capacity: 71,500	
Location of the host cities of the 2005 CONCACAF Gold Cup.

== Squads ==
The 12 national teams involved in the tournament were required to register a squad of 23 players; only players in these squads were eligible to take part in the tournament.

== Group stage ==
=== Group A ===
Pos	Team	Pld	W	D	L	GF	GA	GD	Pts	Qualification
1	Honduras	3	2	1	0	4	2	+2	7	Advance to Knockout stage
2	Panama	3	1	1	1	3	3	0	4	Advance to Knockout stage
3	Colombia	3	1	0	2	3	3	0	3	Advance to Knockout stage
4	Trinidad and Tobago	3	0	2	1	3	5	−2	2	

July 6, 2005
19:00

Colombia	0–1	Panama
	Report	Tejada 70'

Orange Bowl, Miami
Attendance: 10,311
Referee: Carlos Batres (Guatemala)
July 6, 2005
21:00

Trinidad and Tobago	1–1	Honduras
Birchall 28'	Report	Figueroa 43'

Orange Bowl, Miami
Attendance: 10,311
Referee: Mauricio Navarro (Canada)

July 10, 2005
21:00

Panama	2–2	Trinidad and Tobago
Tejada 24', 90+1'	Report	Andrews 17'; Glenn 90'

Orange Bowl, Miami
Attendance: 17,292
Referee: Enrico Wijngaarde (Suriname)
July 10, 2005
19:00

Honduras	2–1	Colombia
Velásquez 79', 82'	Report	Moreno 30' (pen.)

Orange Bowl, Miami
Attendance: 17,292
Referee: Marco Rodríguez (Mexico)

July 12, 2005
17:00

Colombia	2–0	Trinidad and Tobago
Aguilar 77'; Hurtado 79'	Report

Orange Bowl, Miami
Attendance: 8,457
Referee: Marco Rodríguez (Mexico)
July 12, 2005
19:00

Honduras	1–0	Panama
Caballero 80'	Report

Orange Bowl, Miami, Florida, U.S.
Attendance: 8,457
Referee: Enrico Wijngaarde (Suriname)

=== Group B ===
Pos	Team	Pld	W	D	L	GF	GA	GD	Pts	Qualification
1	United States	3	2	1	0	6	1	+5	7	Advance to Knockout stage
2	Costa Rica	3	2	1	0	4	1	+3	7	Advance to Knockout stage
3	Canada	3	1	0	2	2	4	−2	3	
4	Cuba	3	0	0	3	3	9	−6	0	

July 7, 2005
17:30

Canada	0–1	Costa Rica
	Report	Soto 30' (pen.)

Qwest Field, Seattle
Attendance: 15,831
Referee: Peter Prendergast (Jamaica)
July 7, 2005
19:30

Cuba	1–4	United States
Moré 18'	Report	Dempsey 45'; Donovan 87', 90+2'; Beasley 90'

Qwest Field, Seattle
Attendance: 15,831
Referee: José Pineda (Honduras)

July 9, 2005
11:30

Costa Rica	3–1	Cuba
Brenes 61', 85' (pen.); Soto 81' (pen.)	Report	Galindo 72'

Qwest Field, Seattle
Attendance: 15,109
Referee: Benito Archundia (Mexico)
July 9, 2005
13:30

United States	2–0	Canada
Hutchinson 48' (o.g.); Donovan 90'	(Report)

Qwest Field, Seattle
Attendance: 15,109
Referee: Neal Brizan (Trinidad and Tobago)

July 12, 2005
19:00

United States	0–0	Costa Rica
	Report

Gillette Stadium, Foxboro
Attendance: 15,211
Referee: Benito Archundia (Mexico)
July 12, 2005
21:00

Canada	2–1	Cuba
Gerba 69'; Hutchinson 87'	Report	Cervantes 90'

Gillette Stadium, Foxboro
Attendance: 15,211
Referee: Roberto Moreno (Panama)

=== Group C ===
Pos	Team	Pld	W	D	L	GF	GA	GD	Pts	Qualification
1	Mexico	3	2	0	1	6	2	+4	6	Advance to Knockout stage
2	South Africa	3	1	2	0	6	5	+1	5	Advance to Knockout stage
3	Jamaica	3	1	1	1	7	7	0	4	Advance to Knockout stage
4	Guatemala	3	0	1	2	4	9	−5	1	

July 8, 2005
19:00

South Africa	2–1	Mexico
Evans 28'; Van Heerden 41'	Report	Rodríguez 83'

The Home Depot Center, Carson
Attendance: 27,000
Referee: Rodolfo Sibrian (El Salvador)
July 8, 2005
21:00

Guatemala	3–4	Jamaica
Ruiz 11' (pen.), 45', 87'	Report	Shelton 3'; Fuller 5'; Williams 45' (pen.); Hue 57'

The Home Depot Center, Carson
Attendance: 27,000
Referee: Brian Hall (United States)

July 10, 2005
12:00

Mexico	4–0	Guatemala
Borgetti 5', 14'; Galindo 54'; Bravo 65'	Report

Los Angeles Memorial Coliseum, Los Angeles
Attendance: 30,710
Referee: Óscar Ruiz (Colombia)
July 10, 2005
14:00

Jamaica	3–3	South Africa
Hue 35'; Stewart 45'; Bennett 80'	Report	Raselemane 35'; Ndlela 41'; Nomvethe 56'

Los Angeles Memorial Coliseum, Los Angeles
Attendance: 30,710
Referee: Kevin Stott (United States)

July 13, 2005
19:00

Guatemala	1–1	South Africa
Romero 37'	Report	Nkosi 45'

Reliant Stadium, Houston
Attendance: 45,311
Referee: Kevin Stott (United States)
July 13, 2005
21:00

Mexico	1–0	Jamaica
Medina 19'	Report

Reliant Stadium, Houston
Attendance: 45,311
Referee: Wálter Quesada (Costa Rica)

=== Ranking of third-placed teams ===
Pos	Team	Pld	W	D	L	GF	GA	GD	Pts	Qualification
1	Jamaica	3	1	1	1	7	7	0	4	Advance to Knockout stage
2	Colombia	3	1	0	2	3	3	0	3	Advance to Knockout stage
3	Canada	3	1	0	2	2	4	−2	3	

== Knockout stage ==
=== Bracket ===
Quarter-finals
July 16 – Foxboro
Honduras	3
Costa Rica	2
July 16 – Foxboro
United States	3
Jamaica	1
July 17 – Houston
Mexico	1
Colombia	2
July 17 – Houston
South Africa	1 (3)
Panama (p)	1 (5)

Semi-finals
July 21 – East Rutherford
Honduras	1
United States	2
July 21 – East Rutherford
Colombia	2
Panama	3

Final
July 24 – East Rutherford
United States (p)	0 (3)
Panama	0 (1)

=== Quarter-finals ===
July 16, 2005
13:00

Honduras	3–2	Costa Rica
Velásquez 6'; Turcios 27'; Núñez 30'	Report	Bolaños 40'; Ruiz 81'

Gillette Stadium, Foxboro
Attendance: 22,108
Referee: Benito Archundia (Mexico)

July 16, 2005
16:00

United States	3–1	Jamaica
Wolff 6'; Beasley 42', 83'	Report	Fuller 88'

Gillette Stadium, Foxboro
Attendance: 22,108
Referee: Carlos Batres (Guatemala)

July 17, 2005
15:00

Mexico	1–2	Colombia
Pineda 65'	Report	Castrillón 58'; Aguilar 74'

Reliant Stadium, Houston
Attendance: 60,050
Referee: Rodolfo Sibrian (El Salvador)

July 17, 2005
18:00

South Africa	1–1 (a.e.t.)	Panama
Ndlela 68'	Report	Jo. Dely Valdés 48'
Penalties
Evans (penalty scored); Gaxa (penalty scored); Katza (penalty missed); Lekgwathi (penalty scored)	3–5	(penalty scored) Tejada; (penalty scored) Rodríguez; (penalty scored) Baloy; (penalty scored) Blanco; (penalty scored) Gómez

Reliant Stadium, Houston
Attendance: 60,050
Referee: Peter Prendergast (Jamaica)

=== Semi-finals ===
July 21, 2005
18:00

Honduras	1–2	United States
Guerrero 30'	Report	O'Brien 86'; Onyewu 90+2'

Giants Stadium, East Rutherford
Attendance: 41,721
Referee: Peter Prendergast (Jamaica)

July 21, 2005
21:00

Colombia	2–3	Panama
Patiño 63', 89'	Report	Phillips 11', 73'; Jo. Dely Valdés 26'

Giants Stadium, East Rutherford
Attendance: 41,721
Referee: Rodolfo Sibrian (El Salvador)

=== Final ===
July 24, 2005
15:00

United States	0–0 (a.e.t.)	Panama
	Report
Penalties
Quaranta (penalty scored); Armas (penalty missed); Donovan (penalty scored); Davis (penalty scored)	3–1	(penalty missed) Tejada; (penalty missed) Jo. Dely Valdés; (penalty scored) Baloy; (penalty missed) Blanco

Giants Stadium, East Rutherford
Attendance: 31,018
Referee: Carlos Batres (Guatemala)

== Statistics ==
=== Goalscorers ===
3 goals

- (United States) DaMarcus Beasley (Golden Boot Winner)
- (United States) Landon Donovan
- (Guatemala) Carlos Ruiz
- (Honduras) Wilmer Velásquez
- (Panama) Luis Tejada

2 goals

- (Colombia) Abel Aguilar
- (Colombia) Jairo Patiño
- (Costa Rica) Randall Brenes
- (Costa Rica) Jafet Soto
- (Jamaica) Ricardo Fuller
- (Jamaica) Jermaine Hue
- (Mexico) Jared Borgetti
- (Panama) Jorge Dely Valdés
- (Panama) Ricardo Phillips
- (South Africa) Lungisani Ndlela

1 goal

- (Canada) Ali Gerba
- (Canada) Atiba Hutchinson
- (Colombia) Jaime Castrillon
- (Colombia) Héctor Hurtado
- (Colombia) Tressor Moreno
- (Costa Rica) Christian Bolaños
- (Costa Rica) Bryan Ruiz
- (Cuba) Alain Cervantes
- (Cuba) Maykel Galindo
- (Cuba) Lester More
- (Guatemala) Gonzalo Romero
- (Honduras) Samuel Caballero
- (Honduras) Mario Ivan Guerrero
- (Honduras) Maynor Figueroa
- (Honduras) Milton Núñez
- (Honduras) Danilo Turcios
- (Jamaica) Teafore Bennett
- (Jamaica) Luton Shelton
- (Jamaica) Damion Stewart
- (Jamaica) Andy Williams
- (Mexico) Omar Bravo
- (Mexico) Gerardo Galindo
- (Mexico) Gonzalo Pineda
- (Mexico) Alberto Medina
- (Mexico) Francisco Rodríguez
- (South Africa) Philip Evans
- (South Africa) Elrio Van Heerden
- (South Africa) Solace Nkosi
- (South Africa) Siyabango Nomvete
- (South Africa) Abram Raselemane
- (Trinidad and Tobago) Marvin Andrews
- (Trinidad and Tobago) Chris Birchall
- (Trinidad and Tobago) Cornell Glen
- (United States) Clint Dempsey
- (United States) John O'Brien
- (United States) Oguchi Onyewu
- (United States) Josh Wolff

== Awards ==
=== Winners ===
2005 Gold Cup winners

United States
Third title

=== Individual awards ===
Top Scorer:	Most Valuable Player:	Top Goalkeeper:	Fair Play Award:
(United States) DaMarcus Beasley (United States) Landon Donovan (Guatemala) Carlos Ruiz (Panama) Luis Tejada (Honduras) Wilmer Velásquez (3 goals each)	(Panama) Luis Tejada	(Panama) Jaime Penedo	Honduras

All-Star Team
Goalkeepers	Defenders	Midfielders	Forwards
(Panama) Jaime Penedo	(Panama) Felipe Baloy (Honduras) Samuel Caballero (United States) Oguchi Onyewu	(United States) DaMarcus Beasley (United States) Landon Donovan (Colombia) Jairo Patiño (Mexico) Luis Ernesto Pérez	(Colombia) Tressor Moreno (Panama) Luis Tejada (Honduras) Wilmer Velásquez

Honorable Mention
Goalkeepers	Defenders	Midfielders	Forwards
(United States) Kasey Keller	(Jamaica) Tyrone Marshall (Costa Rica) Michael Umaña	(South Africa) Philip Evans (United States) John O'Brien	(Panama) Jorge Dely Valdés (Costa Rica) Jafet Soto
