= 2026–27 SAFA Second Division Western Cape =

ABC Motsepe League
- Season: 2026–27

The 2026–27 SAFA Second Division (known as the ABC Motsepe League for sponsorship reasons) is the 29th season of the SAFA Second Division, the third tier for South African association football clubs, since its establishment in 1998. Due to the size of South Africa, the competition was split into nine divisions, one for each region. After the league stage of the regional competition is completed, the nine winning teams of each regional division will enter the playoffs.

The competition is administered by the South African Football Association.

== League table ==
=== Stream A ===
As of 8 September 2026

Pos	Team	Pld	W	D	L	GF	GA	GD	Pts	Qualification or relegation
1	Cape Town Spurs	0	0	0	0	0	0	0	0	Qualification for Western Cape final
2	FN Rangers	0	0	0	0	0	0	0	0	
3	Hanover Park	0	0	0	0	0	0	0	0	
4	Harambee	0	0	0	0	0	0	0	0	
5	Hout Bay United	0	0	0	0	0	0	0	0	
6	Ikapa Sporting	0	0	0	0	0	0	0	0	
7	Inter City	0	0	0	0	0	0	0	0	
8	Santos	0	0	0	0	0	0	0	0	
9	Saxon Rovers	0	0	0	0	0	0	0	0	
10	Seaside Spurs	0	0	0	0	0	0	0	0	
11	Ubuntu	0	0	0	0	0	0	0	0	
12	Young Bafana	0	0	0	0	0	0	0	0	Relegation to Hollywoodbets Regional League

Source: https://inqaku.com/leagues/view?season_id=15233&stream_id=24234

=== Stream B ===
As of 8 September 2026

Pos	Team	Pld	W	D	L	GF	GA	GD	Pts	Qualification or relegation
1	Ammar Soccer Academy	0	0	0	0	0	0	0	0	Qualification for Western Cape final
2	Barcelona	0	0	0	0	0	0	0	0	
3	Battalions	0	0	0	0	0	0	0	0	
4	Bayhill United	0	0	0	0	0	0	0	0	
5	Diadora	0	0	0	0	0	0	0	0	
6	Grassy Park United	0	0	0	0	0	0	0	0	
7	Kayamandi	0	0	0	0	0	0	0	0	
8	Maties	0	0	0	0	0	0	0	0	
9	Mbekweni Cosmos	0	0	0	0	0	0	0	0	
10	One	0	0	0	0	0	0	0	0	
11	Royal Blues	0	0	0	0	0	0	0	0	
12	Ubuntu Spartans	0	0	0	0	0	0	0	0	Relegation to Hollywoodbets Regional League

Source: https://inqaku.com/leagues/view?season_id=15233&stream_id=24234

== Results ==
=== Stream A ===
As of 22 August 2026

Home \ Away	CTS	FNR	HPA	HAR	HBU	IKA	INT	SAN	SXR	SSP	UBU	YBA
Cape Town Spurs	—											
FN Rangers		—										
Hanover Park			—									
Harambee				—								
Hout Bay United					—							
Ikapa Sporting						—						
Inter City							—					
Santos								—				
Saxon Rovers									—			
Seaside Spurs										—		
Ubuntu											—	
Young Bafana												—

Updated to match(es) played on August 2026. Source: Flashscore
Legend: Blue = home team win; Yellow = draw; Red = away team win.

=== Stream B ===
As of 8 September 2026

Home \ Away	ASA	BAR	BAT	BHU	DIA	GPU	KAY	MAT	MBC	ONE	RBL	UBS
Ammar Soccer Academy	—											
Barcelona		—										
Battalions			—									
Bayhill United				—								
Diadora					—							
Grassy Park United						—						
Kayamandi							—					
Maties								—				
Mbekweni Cosmos									—			
One										—		
Royal Blues											—	
Ubuntu Spartans												—

Updated to match(es) played on August 2026. Source: Flashscore
Legend: Blue = home team win; Yellow = draw; Red = away team win.

== See more ==
- Betway Premiership
- Motsepe Foundation Championship
- ABC Motsepe League
- Hollywoodbets Regional League
