= 2026–27 SAFA Second Division =

ABC Motsepe League
- Season: 2026–27

The 2026–27 SAFA Second Division (known as the ABC Motsepe League for sponsorship reasons) is the 29th season of the SAFA Second Division, the third tier for South African association football clubs, since its establishment in 1998. Due to the size of South Africa, the competition was split into nine divisions, one for each province. After the league stage of the regional competition is completed, the nine winning teams of each regional division will enter the playoffs.

The competition is administered by the South African Football Association.

The following divisions are:

- 2026-27 ABC Motsepe League Eastern Cape
- 2026-27 ABC Motsepe League Free State
- 2026-27 ABC Motsepe League Gauteng
- 2026-27 ABC Motsepe League KwaZulu-Natal
- 2026-27 ABC Motsepe League Limpopo
- 2026-27 ABC Motsepe League Mpumalanga
- 2026-27 ABC Motsepe League North West
- 2026-27 ABC Motsepe League Northern Cape
- 2026-27 ABC Motsepe League Western Cape.
