= 2026–27 SAFA Second Division Mpumalanga =

ABC Motsepe League
- Season: 2026–27

The 2026–27 SAFA Second Division (known as the ABC Motsepe League for sponsorship reasons) is the 29th season of the SAFA Second Division, the third tier for South African association football clubs, since its establishment in 1998. Due to the size of South Africa, the competition was split into nine divisions, one for each region. After the league stage of the regional competition is completed, the nine winning teams of each regional division will enter the playoffs.

The competition is administered by the South African Football Association.

== League table ==
=== Stream A ===
Pos	Team	Pld	W	D	L	GF	GA	GD	Pts	Qualification or relegation
1	Amsterdam United	0	0	0	0	0	0	0	0	Qualification for Mpumalanga final
2	Home Culture Express	0	0	0	0	0	0	0	0	
3	Home Defenders	0	0	0	0	0	0	0	0	
4	KwaNdebele United	0	0	0	0	0	0	0	0	
5	Middelburg United	0	0	0	0	0	0	0	0	
6	Machidi Lion Brothers	0	0	0	0	0	0	0	0	
7	Moloto Shimadel	0	0	0	0	0	0	0	0	
8	Phaphama	0	0	0	0	0	0	0	0	
9	Phezulu	0	0	0	0	0	0	0	0	
10	Secunda M Stars	0	0	0	0	0	0	0	0	
11	Tiger Boys	0	0	0	0	0	0	0	0	
12	Witbank City Lads	0	0	0	0	0	0	0	0	Relegation to Hollywoodbets Regional League

Source: https://inqaku.com/leagues/view?season_id=15233&stream_id=24234

=== Stream B ===
Pos	Team	Pld	W	D	L	GF	GA	GD	Pts	Qualification or relegation
1	Acornhoek United	0	0	0	0	0	0	0	0	Qualification for Mpumalanga final
2	Carolina Young Boys	0	0	0	0	0	0	0	0	
3	Dankie Son	0	0	0	0	0	0	0	0	
4	Farnie Battalion	0	0	0	0	0	0	0	0	
5	Junior Callies	0	0	0	0	0	0	0	0	
6	KaMhlushwa Real Madrid	0	0	0	0	0	0	0	0	
7	Liver Brothers	0	0	0	0	0	0	0	0	
8	Luthuli Brigades	0	0	0	0	0	0	0	0	
9	Makhonjwa All Stars	0	0	0	0	0	0	0	0	
10	Matsulu Chelsea	0	0	0	0	0	0	0	0	
11	Sibange Young Stars	0	0	0	0	0	0	0	0	
12	Zebras	0	0	0	0	0	0	0	0	Relegation to Hollywoodbets Regional League

Source: https://inqaku.com/leagues/view?season_id=15233&stream_id=24234

== See also ==
- Betway Premiership
- Motsepe Foundation Championship
- ABC Motsepe League
- Hollywoodbets Regional League
