= 2026–27 SAFA Second Division KwaZulu-Natal =

ABC Motsepe League
- Season: 2026–27

The 2026–27 SAFA Second Division (known as the ABC Motsepe League for sponsorship reasons) is the 29th season of the SAFA Second Division, the third tier for South African association football clubs, since its establishment in 1998. Due to the size of South Africa, the competition was split into nine divisions, one for each region. After the league stage of the regional competition is completed, the nine winning teams of each regional division will enter the playoffs.

The competition is administered by the South African Football Association.

== See more ==
- 2026-27 Betway Premiership
- 2026-27 Motsepe Foundation Championship
- 2026-27 ABC Motsepe League
