= 2023–24 Kaizer Chiefs F.C. season =

Kaizer Chiefs
2023–2024 season
- Head Coach: Cavin Johnson
- Stadium: FNB Stadium
- DStv Premiership: 10th Position
- MTN 8: Semi-final
- Nedbank Cup: Round of 32
- Carling Knockout Cup: Round of 16
- Top goalscorer: League: Pule Mmodi (3 goal); All: Edson Castillo(4 goals)
- All statistics correct as of 02 January 2024.

This current 2023–24 season of the DStv Premiership is Kaizer Chiefs' 28th consecutive season in the PSL League.

== Season summary ==
Kaizer Chiefs has reunited with Kappa once again, forming a partnership back in November 2022 after the Sponsorship deal between Kaizer Chiefs and Nike came to an end. The partnership between Kappa and Kaizer Chiefs will last for the next 5 years.

Kaizer Chiefs will be completing in 4 competitions in total.

Kaizer Chiefs have signed more than 5 players for the season.

There has been a change in the management department; Molefi Ntseki being appointed as the new head coach. The previous head coach Arthur Zwane is appointed as the first assistant coach joining the second assistant coach Dillon Sheppard in Assist Coach position.

== Squad ==
=== Season squad ===
| Jersey No. | Name | Nationality | Position(s) | Date of birth (Age) |
GOALKEEPERS
| 1 | Brandon Peterson | (South Africa) | GK | 22 September 1994 (age 32) |
| 32 | Itumeleng Khune | (South Africa) | GK | 20 June 1987 (age 39) |
| 34 | Bontle Molefe | (South Africa) | GK | 1 June 2003 (age 23) |
| 44 | Bruce Bvuma | (South Africa) | GK | 15 May 1995 (age 31) |
DEFENDERS
| 2 | Edmilson Dove | (Mozambique) | LB | 18 July 1994 (age 32) |
| 4 | Zitha Kwinika | (South Africa) | CB | 4 January 1994 (age 32) |
| 18 | Dillion Solomons | (South Africa) | RB | 13 May 1996 (age 30) |
| 21 | Sifiso Hlanti | (South Africa) | LB | 1 May 1990 (age 36) |
| 24 | Thatayaone Ditlhokwe | (South Africa) | CB/LB | 21 September 1998 (age 28) |
| 25 | Given Msimango | (South Africa) | CB | 4 May 1997 (age 29) |
| 27 | Njabulo Ngcobo | (South Africa) | CB | 27 May 1994 (age 32) |
| 39 | Reeve Frosler | (South Africa) | RB | 11 January 1998 (age 28) |
| 47 | Aiden McCarthy | (South Africa) | LB | 17 December 2003 (age 22) |
MIDFIELDERS
| 3 | Mduduzi Mdantsane | (South Africa) | CM/AM | 13 December 1994 (age 31) |
| 5 | Sibongiseni Mthethwa | (South Africa) | DM | 20 September 1994 (age 32) |
| 6 | Siyethemba Sithebe | (South Africa) | CM/AM | 6 January 1993 (age 33) |
| 8 | Yusuf Maart | (South Africa) | CM | 17 July 1995 (age 31) |
| 10 | Keagan Dolly | (South Africa) | AM/WF | 22 January 1993 (age 33) |
| 11 | Tebogo Potsane | (South Africa) | AM/CM | 3 September 1993 (age 33) |
| 12 | Nkosingiphile Ngcobo | (South Africa) | CM | 16 November 1999 (age 26) |
| 17 | Edson Castillo | (Venezuela) | DM/CM/AM | 18 May 1994 (age 32) |
| 19 | Happy Mashiane | (South Africa) | LM | 1 January 1998 (age 28) |
| 22 | George Matlou | (South Africa) | AM | 12 July 1998 (age 28) |
| 33 | Sabelo Radebe | (South Africa) | AM/WF | 3 February 2003 (age 23) |
| 37 | Samkelo Zwane | (South Africa) | CM | 4 January 2002 (age 24) |
| 42 | Mduduzi Shabalala | (South Africa) | AM | 20 January 2004 (age 22) |
| 47 | Lebohang Lesako | (South Africa) | CM | 3 July 1999 (age 27) |
| — | Darrel Matseke | (South Africa) | DM/CM | 4 January 1999 (age 27) |
| — | Vicky Mkhawana | (South Africa) | AM | 10 January 2006 (age 20) |
FORWARDS
| 7 | Ranga Chivaviro | (South Africa) | CF | 21 November 1992 (age 33) |
| 9 | Ashley Du Preez | (South Africa) | CF/WF | 16 July 1997 (age 29) |
| — | Khama Billiat | (Zimbabwe) | WF | 19 August 1990 (age 36) |
| 13 | Pule Mmodi | (South Africa) | LW/RW | 23 February 1993 (age 33) |
| 14 | Jasond González | (Colombia) | CF | 12 June 1999 (age 27) |
| 36 | Wandile Duba | (South Africa) | CF | 27 June 2004 (age 22) |
| 21 | Christian Saile | (Democratic Republic of the Congo) | CF/WF | 30 November 1999 (age 26) |
| 46 | Keletso Sifama | (South Africa) | WF | 1 January 2003 (age 23) |

== Pre-season and Friendly Games ==
Kaizer Chiefs are holding the team Pre-season camp in Mpumalanga.The Team will travel back to Johannesburg on 15 July 2023. They will travel to Tanzania to face off against Young Africans S.C. in a friendly match and will travel to Botswana for their second friendly match against Township Rollers F.C.

| 22 July 2023 | (Tanzania) Young Africans | 1–0 | (South Africa) Kaizer Chiefs | Dar es Salaam, Tanzania |
| 19:00 EAT(UTC+03:00) 18:00SAST(UTC+02:00) | Musonda 45+1' | Report | | Stadium: National Stadium |

| 29 July 2023 | (Botswana) Township Rollers | 1–0 | (South Africa) Kaizer Chiefs | Gaborone, Botswana |
| 15:30 SAST (UTC+02:00) | Rakhale 80' | Report | | Stadium: Botswana National Stadium |

== DStv Premiership ==
| 6 August 2023 Matchday 1 | Kaizer Chiefs | 0–0 | Chippa United | Durban |
| 15:00 SAST | | Report | | Stadium: Moses Mabhida Stadium |

| 9 August 2023 Matchday 2 | Mamelodi Sundowns | 2–1 | Kaizer Chiefs | Pretoria |
| 15:00 SAST | Ribeiro 21'; Maema 89' | Report | Du Preez 83' | Stadium: Lucas Masterpieces Moripe Stadium |

| 20 August 2023 Matchday 3 | TS Galaxy | 1–0 | Kaizer Chiefs | Mbombela |
| 15:00 SAST | Peterson (o.g.) | Report | | Stadium: Mbombela Stadium |

| 26 August 2023 Matchday 4 | Kaizer Chiefs | 3–0 | AmaZulu | Soweto |
| 20:00 SAST | Mmodi 4', 59'; Castillo 87' | Report | | Stadium: FNB Stadium |

| 30 August 2023 Matchday 5 | Stellenbosch | 0–2 | Kaizer Chiefs | Stellenbosch |
| 19:30 SAST | Adams (yellow card) 6'; Titus (yellow card) 48', (red card) 55'; Rayners (yellow card) 81' | Report | Mmodi 52'; Saile 89'; Mmodi (yellow card) 45'; Shabalala (yellow card) 82' | Stadium: Danie Craven Stadium |

| 16 September 2023 Matchday 6 | Kaizer Chiefs | 0–0 | Royal AM | Soweto |
| 20:00 SAST | | Report | Sithole (yellow card) 76'; Ngcobo (yellow card) 79' | Stadium: FNB Stadium |

| 20 September 2023 Matchday 7 | Supersport United | 1–0 | Kaizer Chiefs | Polokwane |
| 19:30 SAST | Dzvukamanja 2' | Report | | Stadium: Peter Mokaba Stadium |

| 30 September 2023 Matchday 8 | Kaizer Chiefs | 2–1 | Sekhukhune United | Soweto |
| 20:00 SAST | Castillo 59'; Dove 76'; Maart (yellow card) 41' | Report | Mokwana 45'; Cardoso (yellow card) 49' | Stadium: FNB Stadium |

| 3 October 2023 Matchday 9 | Kaizer Chiefs | 0–1 | Cape Town City | Soweto |
| 19:30 SAST | | | Mayo 58' | Stadium: FNB Stadium |

| 28 October 2023 Matchday 10 | Golden Arrows | 2–1 | Kaizer Chiefs | Mpumalanga |
| 20:00 SAST | Mutizwa 20', 54' | Report | Hlanti 23' | Stadium: Mpumalanga Stadium |

| 8 November 2023 Matchday 11 | Kaizer Chiefs | 3–2 | Cape Town Spurs | Soweto |
| 19:30 SAST | Castillo 15'; Chivaviro 25'; Saile 83' | Report | Phewa 43'; Baartman 90' | Stadium: FNB Stadium |

| 11 November 2023 Matchday 12 | Kaizer Chiefs | 0–1 | Orlando Pirates | Soweto |
| 15:30 SAST | | | Makgopa 20' | Stadium: FNB Stadium |

| 26 November 2023 Matchday 13 | Moroka Swallows | 0–1 | Kaizer Chiefs | Bloemfontein |
| 15:30 SAST | | | Saile 82' | Stadium: Seisa Ramabodu Stadium |

| 9 December 2023 Matchday 14 | Polokwane City | 0–1 | Kaizer Chiefs | Polokwane |
| 15:30 SAST | | | Mmodi 51' | Stadium: Old Peter Mokaba Stadium |

| 23 December 2023 Matchday 15 | Kaizer Chiefs | 1–0 | Richards Bay | Soweto |
| 15:30 SAST | Ngcobo 42' | | | Stadium: FNB Stadium |

| 30 December 2023 Matchday 16 | Sekhukhune United | 1–1 | Kaizer Chiefs | Polokwane |
| 20:00 SAST | Mokwana 42' | | Chivaviro 81' | Stadium: Peter Mokaba Stadium |

| 7 May 2024 Matchday 17 | Kaizer Chiefs | 2–2 | TS Galaxy | Soweto |
| 18:30 SAST | Chivaviro 18' 50' Edmilson (red card) 45' | | Mahlangu 32'(pen.) 76' | Stadium: FNB Stadium |

| 18 February 2024 Matchday 18 | Royal AM | 0–0 | Kaizer Chiefs | Durban |
| 15:30 SAST | | | | Stadium: Chatsworth Stadium |

| 2 March 2024 Matchday 19 | Kaizer Chiefs | 0–0 | Moroka Swallows | Soweto |
| 17:30 SAST | | | | Stadium: FNB Stadium |

| 5 March 2024 Matchday 20 | Kaizer Chiefs | 1–0 | Golden Arrows | Soweto |
| 19:30 SAST | Duba 11' | | | Stadium: FNB Stadium |

| 9 March 2024 Matchday 21 | Orlando Pirates | 3–2 | Kaizer Chiefs | Soweto |
| 15:30 SAST | Saleng 24', 68'; Lebitso 58' | | Du Preez 6', 44' | Stadium: Orlando Stadium |

| 30 March 2024 Matchday 22 | Cape Town City | 0–0 | Kaizer Chiefs | Cape Town |
| 15:30 SAST | | | | Stadium: Cape Town Stadium |

| 2 April 2024 Matchday 23 | Kaizer Chiefs | 0–1 | Stellenbosch | Soweto |
| 19:30 SAST | | | Titus 45+1' | Stadium: FNB Stadium |

| 6 April 2024 Matchday 24 | Chippa United | 2–0 | Kaizer Chiefs | Gqeberha |
| 15:00 SAST | Eva Nga 21'; Kwayiba 32' | | | Stadium: Nelson Mandela Bay Stadium |

| 20 April 2024 Matchday 25 | Richards Bay | 1–0 | Kaizer Chiefs | Richards Bay |
| 15:00 SAST | Mcineka 64' | | | Stadium: Richards Bay Stadium |

| 27 April 2024 Matchday 26 | Kaizer Chiefs | 2–1 | Supersport United | Soweto |
| 17:00 SAST | Saile 19'; Shabalala 76' | | Dzvukamanja 53' (pen.) | Stadium: FNB Stadium |

| 30 April 2024 Matchday 27 | Kaizer Chiefs | 1–5 | Mamelodi Sundowns | Soweto |
| 19:30 | Msimango (red card) 19'; Shabalala 85' (pen.) | | Matthews 52', 82'; Esquivel 56'; Ribeiro 90'; Lorch 90+4' | Stadium: FNB Stadium |

| 11 May 2024 Matchday 28 | AmaZulu | 1–1 | Kaizer Chiefs | Durban |
| 17:00 SAST | Letsoalo 39' | | Du Preez 2' | Stadium: Moses Mabhida Stadium |

| 18 May 2024 Matchday 29 | Kaizer Chiefs | 0–0 | Polokwane City | Soweto |
| 15:00 SAST | | | | Stadium: FNB Stadium |

| 24 May 2024 Matchday 30 | Cape Town Spurs | 2–0 | Kaizer Chiefs | Cape Town |
| 15:00 SAST | Cupido 37'; Morton 74' | | | Stadium: Athlone Stadium |

== MTN 8 ==
Kaizer Chiefs will play their first MTN 8 match against Cape Town City F.C. The fixture was automatically confirmed at the end of the 2022–23 South African Premier Division as Cape Town City finished on 4th position and Kaizer Chiefs finishing in the 5th position of the Log.

| 13 August 2023 | Cape Town City | 1–2 | Kaizer Chiefs | Cape Town |
| 15:00 SAST | van Heerden 23' | Report | Du Preez 36'; Castillo 90+4' | Stadium: Athlone Stadium |

| 2 September 2023 | Kaizer Chiefs | 1–1 (1–1 agg.) | Mamelodi Sundowns | Soweto |
| 15:00 SAST | Castillo 61' | Report | Mudau 90+3' | Stadium: FNB Stadium |

| 23 September 2023 | Mamelodi Sundowns | 2–1 | Kaizer Chiefs | Pretoria |
| 15:00 SAST | Shalulile 1', 45+4' | Report | Du Preez 34' (pen.) | Stadium: Lucas Masterpieces Moripe Stadium |

== Carling Knockout Cup ==
| October 2023 | Kaizer Chiefs | 0–1 | AmaZulu | Soweto |
| TBD SAST | | Report | Fillies 88' | Stadium: FNB Stadium |

== Nedbank Cup ==
| 25 February 2024 Nedbank Cup Round of 32 | Kaizer Chiefs | 0–0 (a.e.t.) (4–5 p) | Milford | Johannesburg |
| 16:00 SAST | Chivaviro (penalty missed) | Report | Mthabela (yellow card) 26' (yellow-red card) 26' (red card) 111' | Stadium: FNB Stadium |
| | Penalties |
| | Maart (penalty scored) Castillo (penalty missed); Chivaviro (penalty scored); Du Preez (penalty scored) Solomons (penalty scored) | | (penalty scored) Mbhele (penalty scored) Sigomoshe; (penalty scored) Ngxongo; (penalty scored) Cele (penalty scored) Hleza |

== Statistics ==
| Pos | Team | Pld | W | D | L | GF | GA | GD | Pts |
|---|---|---|---|---|---|---|---|---|---|
| 8 | Polokwane City | 30 | 9 | 12 | 9 | 21 | 27 | −6 | 39 |
| 9 | Golden Arrows | 30 | 10 | 8 | 12 | 32 | 43 | −11 | 38 |
| 10 | Kaizer Chiefs | 30 | 9 | 9 | 12 | 25 | 30 | −5 | 36 |
| 11 | AmaZulu | 30 | 8 | 12 | 10 | 24 | 30 | −6 | 36 |
| 12 | Chippa United | 30 | 8 | 10 | 12 | 29 | 30 | −1 | 34 |

Source: Premier Soccer League

== Transfers ==
Transfer-In

| Date | Position | Nat | Name | From | Fee | Ref |
|---|---|---|---|---|---|---|
| 1 July 2023 | DF | (Botswana) | Thatayaone Ditlhokwe | SuperSport United | Free | |
| 1 July 2023 | DF | (South Africa) | Given Msimango | TS Galaxy | ZAR 4'000'000 | |
| 1 July 2023 | MF | (South Africa) | Mduduzi Mdantsane | Cape Town City | ZAR 3'500'000 | |
| 1 July 2023 | MF | (Venezuela) | Edson Castillo | Caracas F.C. | undisclosed | |
| 1 July 2023 | MF | (South Africa) | Vicky Mkhawana | Kaizer Chiefs (Promoted) | — | |
| 8 July 2023 | MF | (South Africa) | Tebogo Potsane | Royal AM | undisclosed | |
| 20 September 2023 | MF | (South Africa) | Sibongiseni Mthethwa | Stellenbosch | ZAR 6'000'000 | |
| 1 July 2023 | FW | (South Africa) | Ranga Chivaviro | Marumo Gallants | undisclosed | |
| 1 July 2023 | FW | (South Africa) | Pule Mmodi | Golden Arrows | undisclosed | |
Loan In
| 7 August 2023 | FW | (Colombia) | Jasond González | Real Santa Cruz | Undisclosed | |

Transfer-Out/Released

| Date | Position | Nat | Name | To | Fee | ref. |
|---|---|---|---|---|---|---|
| May 2023 | CB | (South Africa) | Eric Mathoho | Released | — | |
| June 2023 | CB | (South Africa) | Siyabonga Ngezana | FCSB | ZAR12'000'000 | |
| June 2023 | MF | (South Africa) | Phathutshedzo Nange | Released | — | |
| June 2023 | MF | (South Africa) | Cole Alexander | Released | — | |
| 13 July 2023 | CB | (South Africa) | Austin Dube | Released | — | |
| 1 August 2023 | FW | (South Africa) | Kgaogelo Sekgota | Released | — | |
| 16 August 2023 | FW | (Burundi) | Bonfils-Caleb Bimenyimana | Released | — | |
| 18 September 2023 | MF | (South Africa) | Kamohelo Mahlatsi | Released | | |
