= 2022–23 Kaizer Chiefs F.C. season =

Kaizer Chiefs 2022–23 football season

Kaizer Chiefs
2022–23 season
- Chairman: Kaizer Motaung
- Head Coach: Arthur Zwane
- Stadium: FNB Stadium
- DStv Premiership: 5th
- MTN 8: Semi-final
- Nedbank Cup: Semi-final
Home colours	Away colours

This current 2022–23 of the South African Premier Division is Kaizer Chiefs' 27th consecutive season in the PSL League.

In December 2022 Kaizer Chiefs reached an agreement with the Municipality of Polokwane and signed an agreement to play some of their home games at Peter Mokaba Stadium in Polokwane.

== Squad ==
=== Season squad ===
Jersey No.	Name	Nationality	Position(s)	Date of birth (Age)
GOALKEEPERS
1	Brandon Peterson	RSA	GK	22 September 1994 (age 31)
32	Itumeleng Khune	RSA	GK	20 June 1987 (age 38)
34	Bontle Molefe	RSA	GK	1 June 2003 (age 22)
44	Bruce Bvuma	RSA	GK	15 May 1995 (age 30)
DEFENDERS
3	Eric Mathoho	RSA	DF	1 March 1990 (age 35)
4	Zitha Kwinika	RSA	DF	4 January 1994 (age 32)
2	Edmilson Dove	MOZ	DF	18 July 1994 (age 31)
27	Njabulo Ngcobo	RSA	DF	27 May 1994 (age 31)
29	Thabani Dube	RSA	DF	16 November 1992 (age 33)
30	Siyabonga Ngezana	RSA	DF	15 July 1997 (age 28)
39	Reeve Frosler	RSA	DF	11 January 1998 (age 28)
MIDFIELDERS
5	Kamohelo Mahlatsi	RSA	MF	23 August 1998 (age 27)
6	Siyethemba Sithebe	RSA	MF	6 January 1993 (age 33)
8	Yusuf Maart	RSA	MF	17 July 1995 (age 30)
10	Keagan Dolly	RSA	MF	22 January 1993 (age 33)
12	Nkosingiphile Ngcobo	RSA	MF	16 November 1999 (age 26)
17	Cole Alexander	RSA	MF	9 July 1989 (age 36)
18	Dillion Solomons	RSA	MF	13 May 1996 (age 29)
19	Happy Mashiane	RSA	MF	1 January 1998 (age 28)
21	Sifiso Hlanti	RSA	MF	1 May 1990 (age 35)
22	George Matlou	RSA	MF	12 July 1998 (age 27)
24	Phathutshedzo Nange	RSA	MF	11 December 1991 (age 34)
33	Sabelo Radebe	RSA	MF	3 February 2003 (age 23)
37	Samkelo Zwane	RSA	MF	4 January 2002 (age 24)
42	Mduduzi Shabalala	RSA	MF	20 January 2004 (age 22)
47	Lebohang Lesako	RSA	MF	3 July 1999 (age 26)
n/a	Darrel Matseke	RSA	MF	n/a
FORWARDS
9	Ashley Du Preez	RSA	FW	16 July 1997 (age 28)
11	Khama Billiat	ZIM	FW	19 August 1990 (age 35)
14	Kgaogelo Sekgota	RSA	FW	22 June 1997 (age 28)
28	Bonfils-Caleb Bimenyimana	BFA	FW	21 November 1997 (age 28)
36	Wandile Duba	RSA	FW	27 June 2004 (age 21)
21	Christian Saile	DRC	FW	30 November 1999 (age 26)
46	Keletso Sifama	RSA	FW	1 January 2003 (age 23)

== DStv Premiership ==
=== League table ===
Pos	Team	Pld	W	D	L	GF	GA	GD	Pts	Qualification or relegation
3	SuperSport United	30	14	9	7	34	22	+12	51	Qualification for Confederation Cup
4	Cape Town City	30	12	9	9	34	30	+4	45	
5	Kaizer Chiefs	30	13	5	12	32	33	−1	44	
6	Stellenbosch	30	10	10	10	39	38	+1	40	
7	Sekhukhune United	30	10	10	10	24	27	−3	40	

Source: Premier Soccer League

=== Matches ===
7 August 2022 1	Royal AM	1–0	Kaizer Chiefs	KwaZulu-Natal
17:30	Nascimento 1'	Report		Stadium: Chatsworth Stadium

9 August 2022 2	Kaizer Chiefs	3–0	Maritzburg United	Gauteng
19:30	Du Preez 4'; Dolly 24'; Shabalala 90+4'	Report		Stadium: FNB Stadium

13 August 2022 3	Mamelodi Sundowns	4–0	Kaizer Chiefs	Pretoria
15:00		Report		Stadium: Lucas Masterpieces Moripe Stadium

20 August 2022 4	Kaizer Chiefs	1–0	Richards Bay	Gauteng
20:00	Solomons 60' (pen.)	Report		Stadium: Moses Mabhida Stadium; Referee: Abongile Tomm(South Africa); Man of the Match: Njabulo Ngcobo

23 August 2022 5	Cape Town City	2–0	Kaizer Chiefs	Cape Town
19:30	González 5'; Fasika 62'	Report		Stadium: Cape Town Stadium

3 September 2022 6	Kaizer Chiefs	0–0	AmaZulu	Soweto
17:30		Report		Stadium: FNB Stadium; Man of the Match: George Matlou

11 September 2022 7	Marumo Gallants	1–1	Kaizer Chiefs	Phokeng
	Makudubela 12'	Report	kwinika 84'	Stadium: Royal Bafokeng Stadium

17 September 2022 8	Kaizer Chiefs	2–1	Supersport	Soweto
20:00	Bimenyimana 40' 54' (pen.)	Report	Grant Margeman 15'	Stadium: FNB Stadium

5 October 2022 9	Swallows	1–2	Kaizer Chiefs	Soweto
19:30 SAST	Isaacs 68'	Report	Bimenyimana 35'; Dolly 45+1'	Stadium: Volkswagen Dobsonville Stadium; Man of the Match: Edmilson Dove

9 October 2022 10	Stellenbosch	1–3	Kaizer Chiefs	Cape Town
15:30 SAST	Mgaga 29'	Report	Bimenyimana 45+4' (pen.), 49' (pen.), 56' (pen.)	Stadium: Cape Town Stadium

15 October 2022 11	Kaizer Chiefs	1–2	Chippa United	Durban
17:30 SAST	Ngezana 43'	Report	Luthuli 54'; Pfumbidzai 89'	Stadium: Moses Mabhida Stadium

19 October 2022 12	Kaizer Chiefs	2–2	TS Galaxy	Soweto
19:30 SAST	Du Preez 7'; Dolly 81'	Report	Parker 33' Traore 41'	Stadium: FNB Stadium

29 October 2022 13	Orlando Pirates	0–1	Kaizer Chiefs	Soweto
15:30 SAST		Report	Yusuf Maart 74'	Stadium: FNB Stadium; Attendance: 87,426; Referee: Victor Gomes; Man of the Match: Yusuf Maart

31 December 2022 14	Kaizer Chiefs	2–0	Golden Arrows	Durban
15:30 SAST	Bimenyimana 14'; Dove 38'	Report		Stadium: Moses Mabhida Stadium; Man of the Match: Itumeleng Khune

7 January 2023 15	Kaizer Chiefs	0–1	Sekhukhune United	Soweto
20:00 SAST		Report	V. Mncube 49'	Stadium: FNB Stadium

13 January 2023 16	AmaZulu	4–0	Kaizer Chiefs	Durban
19:30 SAST	Zuma 14'; Mphahlele 38'; Dion 45'; Bongi Ntuli 90+2'	Report		Stadium: Moses Mabhida Stadium; Man of the Match: Ramahlwe Mphahlele

21 January 2023 17	Kaizer Chiefs	0–1	Mamelodi Sundowns	Soweto
20:00 SAST		Report	Maema	Stadium: FNB Stadium

29 January 2023 18	Kaizer Chiefs	2–0	Royal AM	Polokwane
17:30 SAST	Hlanti 60'; Du Preez 85'	Report		Stadium: Peter Mokaba Stadium; Man of the Match: Sifiso Hlanti

5 February 2023 19	TS Galaxy	0–0	Kaizer Chiefs	Nelspreit
15:30 SAST		Report		Stadium: Mbombela Stadium

19 February 2023 20	Kaizer Chiefs	2–3	Golden Arrows	Polokwane
15:30 SAST	Sifiso Hlanti 8'; M. Shabalala 47'	Report	N. Makhubela 45+1'; Mutizwa 69', 78'	Stadium: Peter Mokaba Stadium

25 February 2023 21	Kaizer Chiefs	1–0	Orlando Pirates	Johannesburg
15:30 SAST	Ndah 89' (o.g.)	Report		Stadium: FNB Stadium

4 March 2023 22	Richards Bay	0–1	Kaizer Chiefs	Durban
15:30 SAST		Report	Ngezana 8'	Stadium: King Zwelithini Stadium

18 March 2023 23	Maritzburg United	2–3	Kaizer Chiefs	Petermaritzburg
20:00 SAST	De Goede 20'; Soukouna 41'	Report	Dolly 5'; Saile 10'; Maart 76'	Stadium: Harry Gwala Stadium

1 April 2023 24	Kaizer Chiefs	2–1	Stellenbosch	Johannesburg
17:30 SAST	Du Preez 11' (pen.); Dolly 25'	Report	Stephens (red card) 16'; Jabaar 46'	Stadium: FNB Stadium

8 April 2023 25	Kaizer Chiefs	1–1	Marumo Gallants	Johannesburg
20:00 SAST	Du Preez 6'	Report	Chivaviro 36'	Stadium: FNB Stadium

23 April 2023 26	Sekhukhune United	1–0	Kaizer Chiefs	Polokwane
17:30 SAST	Seabi 4'	Report		Stadium: Peter Mokaba Stadium

27 April 2023 27	Chippa United	0–1	Kaizer Chiefs	Gqeberha
15:30 SAST		Report	Du Preez 72'	Stadium: Nelson Mandela Bay Stadium

1 May 2023 28	Kaizer Chiefs	1–2	Swallows	Polokwane
15:00 SAST	Saile 23'	Report	Damons 6'; Sam 33'	Stadium: Peter Mokaba Stadium

13 May 2023 29	Supersport United	1–0	Kaizer Chiefs	Pretoria
15:00 SAST	Lungu 40'	Report		Stadium: Lucas Masterpieces Moripe Stadium

20 May 2023 30	Kaizer Chiefs	0–1	Cape Town City	Johannesburg
15:00		Report	Mdantsane 9'	Stadium: FNB Stadium

== MTN 8 ==
28 August 2022 2022 MTN 8 Quarter-final	Stellenbosch	1–1 (a.e.t.) (3–4 p)	Kaizer Chiefs	Stellenbosch
15:00	Nduli 48'	Report	Du Preez 58'	Stadium: Danie Craven Stadium
	Penalties
	Mendieta (penalty scored) Basadien (penalty scored) Mgaga (penalty scored) Van Rooyen (penalty missed) Likuta (penalty missed)		Alexander (penalty scored) Dolly (penalty scored) Ngcobo (penalty scored) Nange (penalty scored)

1 October 2022 2022 MTN 8 Semi-finals 1st leg	Kaizer Chiefs	1–1	AmaZulu	FNB Stadium
15:30 SAST	Dolly 61'	Report	G.Mhango 15'	Referee: Victor Gomes(South Africa); Man of the Match: Kgaogelo Sekgota

23 October 2022 2022 MTN 8 Semi-final 2nd leg	AmaZulu	0–0	Kaizer Chiefs	Durban
		Report		Stadium: Moses Mabhida Stadium; Referee: Jelly Chivani

AmaZulu F.C. progressed to the final of the 2022 MTN 8 after winner with an away-goal after two matches(2 legs) against Kaizer Chiefs.

== Nedbank Cup ==
10 February 2023 Round of 32	Maritzburg United	0–2 (a.e.t.)	Kaizer Chiefs	Pietermaritzburg
19:30 SAST		Report	Saile 92'; Du Preez 113'	Stadium: Harry Gwala Stadium; Man of the Match: Ngezana

12 March 2023 Round of 16	Kaizer Chiefs	2–1	Casric Stars	FNB stadium
18:00 SAST	B.C Bimenyimana 11'; Du Preez 63'	Report	Mosadi 61'	Man of the Match: Shabalala

16 April 2023 Quarter final	Royal AM	1–2 (a.e.t.)	Kaizer Chiefs	Durban
18:00 SAST	Manganyi 28'	Report	Matlaba 36' (o.g.); Du Preez 102' (pen.)	Stadium: Chatsworth Stadium

6 May 2023 Semi-final	Kaizer Chiefs	1–2	Orlando Pirates	Soweto
15:00 SAST	Yusuf Maart 78'	Report	Kermit Erasmus 13'; Sandile Mthethwa 124'	Stadium: FNB Stadium

== Carling Black Label Cup ==
12 November 2022 Semi-finals	Orlando Pirates	0–0 (6–5 p)	Kaizer Chiefs	Soweto
12:00 SAST		Report		Stadium: FNB Stadium; Man of the Match: Monnapule Saleng

== Sparta MACUFE Cup ==
25 September 2022 Friendly match	Kaizer Chiefs	1–1 (a.e.t.) (2–4 p)	Royal AM	Bloemfontein
15:00		Report		Stadium: Free State Stadium

== Club statistics ==
Overall								Home						Away					
Pld	W	D	L	GF	GA	GD	Pts	W	D	L	GF	GA	GD	W	D	L	GF	GA	GD
27	13	5	9	31	29	+2	44	7	3	4	19	13	+6	6	2	5	12	16	−4

Rank	Name	League goals	Cup goals	Total goals
1	A. Du Preez	6	4	10
2	Bimenyimana	7	1	8
3	K. Dolly	5	1	6
4	Christian Saile	1	1	2
4	M. Shabalala	2	0	2
4	S. Ngezana	2	0	2
4	Y. Maart	2	0	2
4	S. Hlanti	2	0	2
5	D. Solomons	1	0	1
5	Z. Kwinika	1	0	1
5	E. Dove	1	0	1

== Transfers ==
=== Transfers in ===
Date	Position	Nationality	Name	From	Ref.
July 2022	DF	RSA	Zitha Macheke	Stellenbosch	
July 2022	FW	RSA	Ashley Du Preez	Stellenbosch	
July 2022	AM	RSA	Siyethemba Sithebe	AmaZulu	
July 2022	MF	RSA	D. Solomons	Swallows F.C.	
July 2022	MF	RSA	Kamohelo Mahlatsi	Swallows F.C.	
July 2022	MF	RSA	G. Matlou	Swallows F.C.	
July 2022	MF	RSA	Yusuf Maart	Sekhukhune United	
August 2022	DF	MOZ	Edmilson Dove	Cape Town City	
August 2022	FW	BDI	Bonfils-Caleb Bimenyimana	FC Kaisar	
January 2023	FW	DRC	Christian Saile	Nchanga Rangers	

=== Transfers out ===
Date	Position	Nationality	name	To	Ref.
January 2023	MF	RSA	Njabulo Blom	St. Louis City SC	

=== Released ===
Date from	Position	Nationality	Name	To	Ref.
July 2022	GK	NGA	Daniel Akpeyi	n/a	
July 2022	DF	RSA	Daniel Cardoso	Sekhukhune United	
July 2022	DF	RSA	Ramahlwe Mphahlele	AmaZulu	
July 2022	DF	RSA	Siphosakhe Ntiya-Ntiya	n/a	
July 2022	MF	AUS	Kearyn Baccus	n/a	
July 2022	MF	KEN	Teddy Akumu	n/a	
July 2022	WF	RSA	Dumisani Zuma	AmaZulu	
July 2022	AM	RSA	Lebogang Manyama	n/a	
July 2022	FW	ZAM	Lazarous Kambole	Young Africans	
July 2022	FW	COL	Leonardo Castro	n/a	
July 2022	FW	SRB	Samir Nurković	n/a	
July 2022	FW	RSA	Bernard Parker	n/a	

=== Loaned out ===
Date from	Position	Nationality	Name	To	Ref
July 2022	MF	RSA	Lebohang Lesako	Swallows F.C.	
July 2022	MF	RSA	Darrel Matsheke	Swallows F.C.	
January 2023	FW	RSA	Keletso Sifama	Casric Stars	
