= 2024–25 Kaizer Chiefs F.C. season =

Football club season

Kaizer Chiefs
2024–2025 season
- Chairman: Dr Kaizer Motaung
- Head Coach: Nasreddine Nabi
- Stadium: FNB Stadium (Primary Home Ground) Moses Mabhida Stadium (Alternative Ground) Peter Mokaba Stadium (Alternative Ground)
- Betway Premiership: 9th Position
- Carling Knockout Cup: Quarter Finals
- Nedbank Cup: Final (Champions)
- Top goalscorer: League: Mduduzi Shabalala (4 goals); All: Mduduzi Shabalala(5 goals)
- Highest home attendance: 85,000 vs Mamelodi Sundowns; 28 September 2024 (Betway Premiership)
- Average home league attendance: 22,172

This current 2024–25 season of the league is Kaizer Chiefs' 29th consecutive season in the Premier Soccer League. It will be participating in 3 cup competitions including the current 2024–25 South African Premier Division after occupying the 10th position on the log table in the previous 2023–24 and missing out on the qualification for the 2024 MTN 8.

== Season summary ==
Kaizer Chiefs brought in a new Head Coach together with a new technical team and signed a total of 11 players and released 7 players for the current season. As part of preparation for the new season, the team had a Pre-season tour in Turkey and played a number of friendly matches. The team also played a number of friendly matches after their return to South Africa from Turkey.

Kaizer Chiefs will host their home games in 2 other stadiums for the current season.

On 28 July 2024 Kaizer Chiefs played a Toyota Cup match against Young Africans and on 13 October 2024, it played the CUFA Cup match against Marumo Gallants at the Free State Stadium located in Bloemfontein and Kaizer Chiefs won 4–3 on penalties after a 0–0 draw

VANUE	IMAGE	LOCATION
FNB Stadium		2024–25 Kaizer Chiefs F.C. season (South Africa)
Moses Mabhida Stadium		2024–25 Kaizer Chiefs F.C. season (South Africa)
Peter Mokaba Stadium		2024–25 Kaizer Chiefs F.C. season (South Africa)

== Squad ==
=== Players ===
Jersey No.	Name	Nationality	Position(s)	Date of birth (Age)
GOALKEEPERS
1	Brandon Peterson	(South Africa)	GK	22 September 1994 (age 31)
30	Fiacre Ntwari	(South Africa)	GK	25 September 1999 (age 26)
34	Bontle Molefe	(South Africa)	GK	1 June 2003 (age 23)
44	Bruce Bvuma	(South Africa)	GK	15 May 1995 (age 31)
DEFENDERS
2	Edmilson Dove	(Mozambique)	LB	18 July 1994 (age 31)
4	Zitha Kwinika	(South Africa)	CB	4 January 1994 (age 32)
14	Rushwin Dortley	(South Africa)		2 May 2002 (age 24)
18	Dillan Solomons	(South Africa)	RB	13 May 1996 (age 30)
23	Bongani Sam	(South Africa)		30 July 1997 (age 28)
24	Thatayaone Ditlhokwe	(South Africa)	CB/LB	21 September 1998 (age 27)
25	Given Msimango	(South Africa)	CB	4 May 1997 (age 29)
29	Donay Jansen ★	(South Africa)	CB	—
34	Nkosana Mbuthu	(South Africa)	LB	—
39	Reeve Frosler	(South Africa)	RB	11 January 1998 (age 28)
47	Aiden McCarthy	(South Africa)	LB	17 December 2003 (age 22)
48	Bradley Cross	(South Africa)	CB	30 January 2001 (age 25)
84	Inácio Miguel (V.C)	(Angola)	CB	12 December 1995 (age 30)
MIDFIELDERS
3	Mduduzi Mdantsane	(South Africa)	CM/AM	13 December 1994 (age 31)
5	Sibongiseni Mthethwa	(South Africa)	DM	20 September 1994 (age 31)
6	Njabulo Blom ☆	(South Africa)	DM	11 December 1999 (age 26)
8	Yusuf Maart (C)	(South Africa)	CM	17 July 1995 (age 30)
10	Gastón Sirino	(Uruguay) (South Africa)	AM/WF	22 February 1991 (age 35)
11	Tebogo Potsane	(South Africa)	AM/CM	3 September 1993 (age 32)
12	Nkosingiphile Ngcobo	(South Africa)	CM	16 November 1999 (age 26)
17	Edson Castillo	(Venezuela)	DM/CM/AM	18 May 1994 (age 32)
19	Happy Mashiane	(South Africa)	LM	1 January 1998 (age 28)
22	George Matlou	(South Africa)	AM	12 July 1998 (age 27)
27	Manqoba Ozoemena	(South Africa)	AM	—
28	Mfundo Vilakazi	(South Africa)	AM	—
33	Sabelo Radebe ★	(South Africa)	AM/WF	3 February 2003 (age 23)
37	Samkelo Zwane	(South Africa)	CM	4 January 2002 (age 24)
42	Mduduzi Shabalala	(South Africa)	AM	20 January 2004 (age 22)
—	Siphesihle Tati	(South Africa)	CM	9 August 2004 (age 21)
FORWARDS
7	Ranga Chivaviro	(South Africa)	CF	21 November 1992 (age 33)
9	Ashley Du Preez	(South Africa)	CF/WF	16 July 1997 (age 28)
13	Pule Mmodi	(South Africa)	LW/RW	23 February 1993 (age 33)
21	Christian Saile	(Democratic Republic of the Congo)	CF/WF	30 November 1999 (age 26)
36	Wandile Duba	(South Africa)	CF	27 June 2004 (age 22)

☆	Loan in
★	Loan Out

=== Technical Team ===
Name	Nationality	Role
Nasreddine Nabi	(Tunisia)	HEAD COACH
Khalil Ben Youssef	(Morocco)	ASSISTANT COACH
Cedric Kaze	(Burundi)	ASSISTANT COACH
Ilyes Mzoughi	(Mauritania)	GOALKEEPER COACH
Safi Majdi	(Tunisia)	FITNESS COACH

== Betway Premiership ==
Win Draw Loss

14 September 2024 Matchday 1	Marumo Gallants	1–2	Kaizer Chiefs	Bloemfontein
17:30 SAST	Sithole 8'; J. Malongoane (red card) 76'	Report	M.Shabalala 17'; Vilakazi 79'	Stadium: Free State Stadium; Man of the Match: B.Cross

25 September 2024 Matchday 2	AmaZulu	1–3	Kaizer Chiefs	Umlazi
19:30 SAST	Ighodaro 47'	Report	R.Chivaviro 12' G.Sirino 14' I.Miguel 23'	Stadium: King Zwelithini Stadium; Man of the Match: I.Miguel

28 September 2024 Matchday 3	Kaizer Chiefs	1–2	Mamelodi Sundowns	Johannesburg
15:00 SAST	R.Chivaviro 9'	Report	L.Ribeiro 31'; I.Rayners 37'	Stadium: FNB Stadium; Attendance: 85,000; Man of the Match: R.Williams

26 October 2024 Matchday 4	SuperSport United	1–0	Kaizer Chiefs	Pretoria
17:30 SAST	Morris 44'	Report		Stadium: Lucas Moripe Stadium

30 October 2024 Matchday 5	Magesi	2–2	Kaizer Chiefs	Polokwane
19:30 SAST	Makhubu 6'; Chirambadare 72'	Report	Shabalala 77' , 78'	Stadium: Old Peter Mokaba Stadium

27 November 2024 Matchday 6	Kaizer Chiefs	2–1	Richards Bay F.C.	Polokwane
19:30 SAST	Duba 21'; Du Preez 68'	Report	Mbuthuma 90+1'	Stadium: Peter Mokaba Stadium; Man of the Match: Yusuf Maart

30 November 2024 Matchday 7	Kaizer Chiefs	2–2	Royal AM	Polokwane
17:30 SAST	Du Preez 5'; Duba 13'	Report	Maxwele 51'; Mashiane 89'	Stadium: Peter Mokaba Stadium

8 December 2024 Matchday 8	Polokwane City	2–0	Kaizer Chiefs	Polokwane
15:30 SAST	Appollis 17'; Ramabu 90'	Report		Stadium: Old Peter Mokaba Stadium

16 December 2024 Matchday 9	TS Galaxy	1–1	Kaizer Chiefs	Mbombela
15:30	Kabini 35'	Report	Chivaviro 90+6'	Stadium: Mbombela Stadium

29 December 2024 Matchday 10	Kaizer Chiefs	1–0	Chippa United	Durban
17:30 SAST	Shabalala 45'	Report		Stadium: Moses Mabhida Stadium

5 January 2025 Matchday 11	Cape Town City	1–0	Kaizer Chiefs	Cape Town
17:30 SAST	González 51'	Report		Stadium: Cape Town Stadium

8 January 2025 Matchday 12	Kaizer Chiefs	2–1	Stellenbosch	Polokwane
19:30 SAST	Duba 28' , 57'	Report	Lekoloane 20'	Stadium: Peter Mokaba Stadium

12 January 2025 Matchday 13	Kaizer Chiefs	0–1	Golden Arrows	Durban
15:30 SAST		Report	Shitolo 56'	Stadium: Moses Mabhida Stadium

19 January 2025 Matchday 14	Kaizer Chiefs	1–0	Sekhukhune United	Durban
15:30 SAST	Vilakazi 86'	Report		Stadium: Moses Mabhida Stadium

1 February 2025 Matchday 15	Orlando Pirates	1–0	Kaizer Chiefs	Johannesburg
15:30 SAST	Maswanganyi 90+6' (pen.)	Report		Stadium: Orlando Stadium

4 February 2025 Matchday 16	Kaizer Chiefs	2–2	AmaZulu F.C.	Johannesburg
19:30 SAST	Morris 18'; Ofori 63' (O.G.)	Report	Moremi 23'; Kambindu 60'	Stadium: FNB Stadium

7 February 2025 Matchday 17	Stellenbosch	0–1	Kaizer Chiefs	Cape Town
19:00 SAST		Report	Lilepo 4'	Stadium: Athlone Stadium

18 February 2025 Matchday 18	Kaizer Chiefs	1-4	SuperSport United	Johannesburg
19:30 SAST	Lilepo 30'	Report	S.Nurković 3' Saile 32'; Lungu 63' Ndlovu 83'	Stadium: FNB Stadium; Referee: Cedrick Muvhali

21 February 2025 Matchday 19	Royal AM	v	Kaizer Chiefs	Pietermaritzburg
19:30		Report		Stadium: Harry Gwala Stadium

1 March 2025 Matchday 20	Mamelodi Sundowns	v	Kaizer Chiefs	Pretoria
15:00 SAST		Report		Stadium: Loftus Versfeld Stadium

4 March 2025 Matchday 21	Kaizer Chiefs	v	Magesi	Johannesburg
19:30 SAST		Report		Stadium: FNB Stadium

12 March 2025 Matchday 22	Kaizer Chiefs	v	Cape Town City	Johannesburg
19:30 SAST		Report		Stadium: FNB Stadium

16 March 2025 Matchday 23	Richards Bay	v	Kaizer Chiefs	Umlazi
15:30 SAST		Report		Stadium: King Zwelithini Stadium

30 March 2025 Matchday 24	Golden Arrows	v	Kaizer Chiefs	Durban
15:30 SAST		Report		Stadium: Sugar Ray Xulu Stadium

5 April 2025 Matchday 25	Kaizer Chiefs	v	TS Galaxy	Polokwane
15:00 SAST		Report		Stadium: Peter Mokaba Stadium

19 April 2025 Matchday 26	Chippa United	v	Kaizer Chiefs	Gqeberha
15:00 SAST		Report		Stadium: Nelson Mandela Bay Stadium

26 April 2025 Matchday 27	Kaizer Chiefs	v	Marumo Gallants	Johannesburg
15:00 SAST		Report		Stadium: FNB Stadium

3 May 2025 Matchday 28	Kaizer Chiefs	v	Orlando Pirates	Johannesburg
15:00 SAST		Report		Stadium: FNB Stadium

17 May 2025 Matchday 29	Sekhukhune United	v	Kaizer Chiefs	Polokwane
15:00 SAST		Report		Stadium: Peter Mokaba Stadium

24 May 2025 Matchday 30	Kaizer Chiefs	v	Polokwane City	Johannesburg
15:00 SAST		Report		Stadium: FNB Stadium

== Toyota Cup ==
28 July 2024	Kaizer Chiefs	0–4	Young Africans	Bloemfontein
		Report	Dube 25' Ki 45' 63' Mzize 57'	Stadium: Free State Stadium

== CUFA Cup ==
13 October 2024	Kaizer Chiefs	0–0 (4–3 p)	Marumo Gallants	Bloemfontein
TBC		Report		Stadium: Free State Stadium

== Carling Knockout Cup ==
19 October 2024 Rounf of 16	SuperSport United	0–4	Kaizer Chiefs	Polokwane
20:00 SAST	G.Moralo (yellow card) (yellow-red card) 79'	Report	G.Sirino 33' Y.Maart 53'; R.Chivaviro 73' A.Du Preez 90+5'	Stadium: Peter Mokaba Stadium

2 November 2024 Quarter Finals	Kaizer Chiefs	0–4	Mamelodi Sundowns	Johannesburg
18:00 SAST		Report	Rayners 14' (pen.) , 22' Shalulile 40' Mudau 61'	Stadium: FNB Stadium

== Nedbank Cup ==
26 January 2025 Round of 32	Kaizer Chiefs	4-0	Free Agents FC	Johannesburg
18:00 SAST	Mmodi 18' , 26' I. Miguel 62' Chivaviro 83'	Report		Stadium: FNB Stadium; Referee: Msimeleli Mabuto

15 February 2025 Round of 16	Kaizer Chiefs	3-0	Chippa United	Johannesburg
	Sirino 13' I.Miguel 77' (pen.) Mmodi 89'	Report		Stadium: FNB Stadium; Referee: Zenith Makhalima

== Statistics ==
=== Overall Record ===
Competition	First match	Last match	Starting round	Final position	Record							
Competition	First match	Last match	Starting round	Final position	Pld	W	D	L	GF	GA	GD	Win %
2024–25 South African Premier Division	14 September 2024	24 May 2025	Matchday 1	9th	28	8	8	12	25	32	−7	28.57
2024–25 Nedbank Cup	26 January 2025	10 May 2025	Round of 32	Champions	5	5	0	0	14	3	+11	100.00
2024 Carling Knockout Cup	19 October 2024	TBD	Round of 16	Quarter Final	2	1	0	1	4	4	+0	50.00
Total					35	14	8	13	43	39	+4	40.00

Source: Competitions

=== League Position ===
Pos	Team	Pld	W	D	L	GF	GA	GD	Pts	Qualification or relegation
7	Polokwane City	28	8	10	10	19	25	−6	34	
8	Richards Bay	28	9	6	13	19	26	−7	33	
9	Kaizer Chiefs	28	8	8	12	25	32	−7	32	Qualification for 2025–26 CAF Confederation Cup
10	Marumo Gallants	28	8	8	12	26	39	−13	32	
11	Chippa United	28	8	7	13	22	28	−6	31	

Source: Premier Soccer League

== Transfers ==
Transfer-In

Date	Position	Nat	Name	From	Fee	Ref
28 July 2024	GK	(Rwanda)	Fiacre Ntwari	TS Galaxy	Undisclosed	
21 August 2024	DF	(Angola)	Inácio Miguel	Petro de Luanda	Undisclosed	
3 September 2024	DF	(South Africa)	Bradley Cross	Lamontville Golden Arrows	Undisclosed	
28 July 2024	DF	(South Africa)	Rushwin Dortley	Cape Town Spurs	Undisclosed	
3 August 2024	DF	(South Africa)	Bongani Sam	Orlando Pirates	Undisclosed	
12 September 2024	DF	(South Africa)	Donay Jansen	Kaizer Chiefs Development	Free	
28 July 2024	MF	(South Africa)	Manqoba Ozoemena	Kaizer Chiefs Development	Free	
28 July 2024	MF	(South Africa)	Siphesihle Tati	Kaizer Chiefs Development	Free	
28 July 2024	DF	(South Africa)	Nkosana Mbuthu	Kaizer Chiefs Development	Free	
3 August 2024	MF	(Uruguay) (South Africa)	Gastón Sirino	Mamelodi Sundowns	Free	
Loan In
3 September 2024	MF	(South Africa)	Njabulo Blom	St. Louis City SC	Undisclosed	

Transfer-Out/Released

Date	Position	Nat	Name	To	Fee	ref.
29 June 2024	DF	(South Africa)	Njabulo Ngcobo	Released	none	
29 June 2024	DF	(South Africa)	Sifiso Hlanti	Released	none	
29 June 2024	MF	(South Africa)	Siyethemba Sithebe	Released	none	
29 June 2024	AM/WF	(South Africa)	Keagan Dolly	Released	none	
30 June 2024	CF	(Colombia)	Jasond González	Released	none	
Loan Out
20 September 2024	DF	(South Africa)	Donay Jansen	SuperSport United	undisclosed	
20 September 2024	CF/WF	(South Africa)	Sabelo Radebe	Richards Bay	undisclosed	
