= 2022 MTN 8 =

48th MTN 8 season

Tournament details
- Country: South Africa
- Date: 6 August – 5 November 2022
- Teams: 8

Final positions
- Champions: Orlando Pirates (11th title)
- Runners-up: AmaZulu F.C.

Tournament statistics
- Matches played: 9
- Goals scored: 16 (1.78 per match)
- Top goal scorer: Monnapule Saleng (3 goals)

The 2022 MTN 8 was the 48th edition of the South African soccer knockout competition featuring the top 8-placed teams at the conclusion the previous DStv Premiership season and the 15th under its current name.

== Teams ==
The following 8 teams are listed according to their final position on the league table of/for the previous season of the 2021-22 DStv Premiership

1. Mamelodi Sundowns
2. Cape Town City
3. Royal AM
4. Stellenbosch
5. Kaizer Chiefs
6. Orlando Pirates
7. AmaZulu
8. Supersport United

== Quarter–finals ==
The fixtures were confirmed following the conclusion of the previous season based on the competition format as follows:

28 August 2022
18:00

| Mamelodi Sundowns | 2–0 | SuperSport United |
|---|---|---|
| Allende 79' Nassir 90+1' | Report |

Loftus Versfeld Stadium
27 August 2022
15:00

| Cape Town City | 1–2 (a.e.t.) | AmaZulu |
|---|---|---|
| Mayo 45+2' | Report | Kwem 9' Majoro 113' |

Athlone Stadium, Cape Town
27 August 2022
18:00

| Royal AM | 1–2 | Orlando Pirates |
|---|---|---|
| Mogaila 58' | Report | Vincent Pule 3' Thabiso Monyane 55' |

Chatsworth Stadium, Durban
28 August 2022
15:00

| Stellenbosch | 1–1 (a.e.t.) | Kaizer Chiefs |
|---|---|---|
| Nduli 48' | Report | Du Preez 58' |
Penalties
| Mendieta (penalty scored) Basadien (penalty scored) Mgaga (penalty scored) Van Rooyen (penalty missed) Likuta (penalty missed) | 3-4 | Alexander (penalty scored) Dolly (penalty scored) Ngcobo (penalty scored) Nange (penalty scored) |

Danie Craven Stadium, Stellenbosch

== Semi–finals ==
1st leg.

| 1 October 2022 1st Leg | Orlando Pirates | 0–0 | Mamelodi Sundowns | Soweto |
| 15:30 SAST | | Report | | Stadium: Orlando Stadium; Attendance: 37 000 |

| 2 October 2022 1st Leg | Kaizer Chiefs | 1–1 | AmaZulu | Johannesburg |
| 15:30 SAST | Dolly 61' | Report | G.Mhango 15' | Stadium: FNB Stadium |

| 22 October 2022 2nd Leg | Mamelodi Sundowns | 0–3 (0–3 agg.) | Orlando Pirates | Polokwane |
| 15:30 SAST | | Report | Erasmus 8'; Saleng 83', 90+2' | Stadium: Peter Mokaba Stadium; Attendance: 45 000; Referee: Thando Nzanzeka |

| 23 October 2022 2nd Leg | AmaZulu | 0–0 (1–1 (a) agg.) | Kaizer Chiefs | Durban |
| 15:30 SAST | | Report | | Stadium: Moses Mabhida Stadium; Referee: Jelly Chivani |

== Final ==
5 November 2022
18:00
Final

| Orlando Pirates | 1–0 | AmaZulu |
|---|---|---|
| Saleng 25' |

Moses Mabhida Stadium, Durban
Attendance: 50,000
Referee: Luxolo Badi

== Statistics ==
=== Goals ===
3 goals

- Monnapule Saleng

==== 1 goal ====
- Augustine Kwem
- Khanyisa Mayo
- Lehlohonolo Majoro
- Vincent Pule
- Thabiso Monyane
- Shaune Mogaila
- Ashley Du Preez
- Sihle Nduli
- Marcelo Allende
- Abubeker Nassir
- Keagan Dolly
- Gabadinho Mhango
- Kermit Erasmus
