= 2023 MTN 8 =

Tournament details
- Date: 12 August 2023 — 7 October 2023
- Teams: 8

Final positions
- Champions: Orlando Pirates (12th title)
- Runners-up: Mamelodi Sundowns

Tournament statistics
- Matches played: 9
- Goals scored: 19 (2.11 per match)
- Top goal scorer: Zakhele Lepasa(4 goals)
- All statistics correct as of 31 December 2023.

The 2023 MTN 8 was the 49th edition of the South African soccer competition featuring the top 8-placed teams at the conclusion of the previous DStv Premiership season and the 16th under its current sponsored name. The competition started on 12 August 2023 and the final match was played on 7 October 2023.

It was won by Orlando Pirates F.C., who defended their title.

The 2023 season saw the unveiling of a new trophy.

== Teams ==
The following 8 teams are listed according to their final position on the league table in the previous season of the 2022-23 DStv Premiership.

1. Mamelodi Sundowns
2. Orlando Pirates
3. SuperSport United
4. Kaizer Chiefs
5. Cape Town City
6. Stellenbosch
7. Sekhukhune United
8. Swallows F.C.

== Quarter-finals ==
The quarter-finals were played in the second week of August.

| 12 August 2023 | Mamelodi Sundowns | 1-0 | Moroka Swallows | Pretoria |
| 15:00 SAST | Zwane 48' (yellow card) 0'; Mokwena (yellow card) 45+1'; Maema (yellow card) 76'; Allende (yellow card) 90' | Report | Jali (red card) 7' | Stadium: Loftus Versfeld Stadium |

| 12 August 2023 | Orlando Pirates | 5-0 | Sekhukhune United | Soweto |
| 18:00 SAST | Lepasa 22', 56', 87' (yellow card) 43'; Ndlondlo 59' (yellow card) 40'; Saleng 62'; Monare (yellow card) 52' | Report | Ohizu (yellow card) 27'; Webber (yellow card) 40'; Mobbie (yellow card) 78' | Stadium: Orlando Stadium |

| 13 August 2023 | Cape Town City | 1-2 | Kaizer Chiefs | Cape Town |
| 15:00 SAST | van Heerden 23'; Rhodes (yellow card) 25'; Ambina (yellow card) 90+5' | Report | Du Preez 36'; Castillo 90+4'; Hlanti (yellow card) 27'; Potsane (yellow card) 45+2' | Stadium: Athlone Stadium |

| 13 August 2023 | SuperSport United | 0-1 (a.e.t.) | Stellenbosch | Polokwane |
| 18:00 SAST | | Report | de Jong 99' | Stadium: Peter Mokaba Stadium |

== Semi–finals ==
1st leg.

| 2 September 2023 1st Leg | Kaizer Chiefs | 1–1 | Mamelodi Sundowns | Johannesburg |
| 15:00 SAST | Castillo 61' | Report | Mudau 90' | Stadium: FNB Stadium |

| 3 September 2023 1st Leg | Stellenbosch | 1–2 | Orlando Pirates | Cape Town |
| 15:00 SAST | Touré 45' | Report | Lepasa 66'; Hotto 90' | Stadium: Athlone Stadium |

2nd leg.

| 23 September 2023 2nd Leg | Mamelodi Sundowns | 2–1 (3–2 agg.) | Kaizer Chiefs | Pretoria |
| 15:00 SAST | Shalulile 1'; Shalulile 45' | Report | Matlou 34' | Stadium: Loftus Versfeld Stadium |

| 24 September 2023 2nd Leg | Orlando Pirates | 0–1 (2–2 agg.) | Stellenbosch | Soweto |
| 15:00 SAST | | Report | Lepasa(OG) 23' | Stadium: Orlando Stadium |

== Final ==
| 7 October 2023 | Orlando Pirates | 0–0 (3-1 p) | Mamelodi Sundowns | Durban |
| 19:00 SAST | | Report | | Stadium: Moses Mabhida Stadium |
| | Penalties |
| | Hotto (penalty scored); Kapinga (penalty scored); Xoki (penalty missed); Kimvuidi (penalty scored) | | Zungu (penalty missed); Mendieta (penalty missed); Mokoena (penalty missed); Mvala (penalty scored) |

== Statistics ==
=== Goal Scorers ===
As of 1 September 2023

| Rank | Player name | Team | Total |
|---|---|---|---|
| 1 | Zakhele Lepasa | Orlando Pirates | 4 |
| 2 | Peter Shalulile | Mamelodi Sundowns | 2 |
| 3 | Themba Zwane | Mamelodi Sundowns | 1 |
| 3 | Ndabayithethwa Ndlondlo | Orlando Pirates | 1 |
| 3 | Monnapule Saleng | Orlando Pirates | 1 |
| 3 | Mark van Heerden | Cape Town City | 1 |
| 3 | Ashley Du Preez | Kaizer Chiefs | 1 |
| 3 | Edson Castillo | Kaizer Chiefs | 1 |
| 3 | Andre de Jong | Stellenbosch | 1 |

=== Assists ===
As of 1 September 2023

| Rank | Player name | Team | Total |
|---|---|---|---|
| 1 | Lucas Ribeiro | Mamelodi Sundowns | 1 |
| 1 | Patrick Maswanganyi | Orlando Pirates | 1 |
| 1 | Monnapule Saleng | Orlando Pirates | 1 |
| 1 | Deon Hotto | Orlando Pirates | 1 |
| 1 | Taahir Goedeman | Cape Town City | 1 |
| 1 | Mduduzi Mdantsane | Kaizer Chiefs | 1 |
| 1 | Christian Saile | Kaizer Chiefs | 1 |
| 1 | Fawaaz Basadien | Stellenbosch | 1 |
