= 2024–25 Nedbank Cup =

Tournament details
- Country: South Africa
- Dates: 24 January 2025 –
- Teams: 32

Final positions
- Champions: Kaizer Chiefs (14th title)

The 2024–25 Nedbank Cup was the 2024–25 edition of South Africa's premier knockout club football (soccer) competition, the Nedbank Cup. It was the 53rd season of the competition, and 18th under its current sponsor.

Defending champions Orlando Pirates were looking to repeat their achievement of 1973 to 1975 by winning the competition for three years in a row. They are so far the only club to perform this feat.

Kaizer Chiefs won the title, breaking a 10 year trophy drought.

== Participating teams ==
=== Teams ===
After a preliminary round featuring eight games between teams from the National First Division and eight games from the SAFA Second Division, the 16 winners joined the 16 teams from the Premiership to enter the main draw.

== Round of 32 ==
24 January 2025	Pretoria Callies	0–1	Marumo Gallants	Atteridgeville
19:00 SAST		Report	Mphambaniso 90+'	Stadium: Lucas Moripe Stadium

25 January 2025	Golden Arrows	1–2	Chippa United	Mpumalanga
15:00 SAST				Stadium: Hammarsdale Stadium

25 January 2025	Umvoti	0–3	Baroka	Pietermaritzburg
15:00 SAST				Stadium: Harry Gwala Stadium

25 January 2025	Venda	1–3	Cape Town Spurs	Thohoyandou
15:00 SAST				Stadium: Thohoyandou Stadium

25 January 2025	Lerumo Lions	0–2	Durban City	Rustenburg
15:00 SAST				Stadium: Olympia Park

25 January 2025	Mamelodi Sundowns	5–2	Sibanye Golden Stars	Pretoria
18:00 SAST				Stadium: Loftus Versfeld

26 January 2025	Richards Bay	1–3	Orlando Pirates	Umlazi
15:00 SAST	Yanela Mbuthuma	Report	Maswanganyi 22'; Maswanganyi 26'; Mabasa 93'	Stadium: King Zwelithini Stadium

26 January 2025	Mpheni Home Defenders	3–1	Hungry Lions	Thohoyandou
15:00 SAST				Stadium: Thohoyandou Stadium

26 January 2025	Polokwane City	1–0	The Bees	Polokwane
15:00 SAST				Stadium: Old Peter Mokaba Stadium

26 January 2025	Kaizer Chiefs	4–0	Free Agents	Johannesburg
18:00 SAST	Mmodi 18'; Mmodi 26'; Miguel 62'; Chivaviro 83'	Report		Stadium: FNB Stadium

27 January 2025	Royal AM	Suspended	Milford	Pietermaritzburg
19:00 SAST				Stadium: Harry Gwala Stadium

27 January 2025	Sekhukhune United	2–0	Cape Town City	Polokwane
19:00 SAST	Otladisa 57'; Mokhouane 71'	Report		Stadium: Old Peter Mokaba Stadium

28 January 2025	AmaZulu	5–1	Mighty Eagles	Umlazi
19:00 SAST	Mthethwa 10'; Mbanjwa 20'; Ighodaro 31'; Mthethwa 81'; Mthethwa 87'	Report	Awonke 68'	Stadium: King Zwelithini Stadium

28 January 2025	Stellenbosch	2–1	Kruger United	Stellenbosch
19:00 SAST				Stadium: Danie Craven Stadium

28 January 2025	Magesi	0–2	SuperSport United	Polokwane
19:00 SAST		Report	Pule 5'; Saile 50'	Stadium: Old Peter Mokaba Stadium

29 January 2025	TS Galaxy	7–0	Vasco da Gama	Mbombela
19:00 SAST				Stadium: Mbombela Stadium

Royal AM's fixtures were suspended by the governing body, the Premier Soccer League (PSL), as a result of the South African Revenue Service preservation order against the club over unpaid tax debts by owner Shauwn Mkhize.

The PSL expelled Royal AM from the Nedbank Cup on February 25, with Milford progressing to the next round.

== Round of 16 ==
12 February 2025	Supersport United	2–1	Cape Town Spurs	Atteridgeville
	Okon 36'; Maboe 119'	Report	Moosa 5'	Stadium: Lucas Moripe Stadium

13 February 2025	Stellenbosch	2–0	Polokwane City	Stellenbosch
	Nikani (o.g.); Titus 37'	Report		Stadium: Danie Craven Stadium

14 February 2025	Durban City	2–1	TS Galaxy	Durban
	Kamatuka 79'; Ndlovu 106'	Report	Zajmovic 49'	Stadium: Chatsworth Stadium

15 February 2025	Orlando Pirates	3–1	Baroka	Johannesburg
	Mabasa 29' , 45+1' , 63'		Malivha 75'	Stadium: Orlando Stadium

15 February 2025	Kaizer Chiefs	3–0	Chippa United	Polokwane
18:00 SAST	Sirino 13' Miguel 77' (Pen.) Mmodi 89'			Stadium: Peter Mokaba

15 February 2025	Marumo Gallants	1–0	AmaZulu	Bloemfontein
15:00 SAST	Zindoga 18'			Stadium: Free State Stadium

16 February 2025	Mamelodi Sundowns	2–0	Mpheni Home Defenders	Pretoria
	Matthews 8' Aubaas 27'	Report		Stadium: Loftus Versfeld Stadium

2 March 2025	Milford	1–2	Sekhukhune United	Durban
15:00 SAST	Chili 43'	Report	Mntambo 21'; Mntambo 34'	Stadium: Princess Magogo Stadium

== Quarter-finals ==
8 March 2025	SuperSport United	2–2 (4-5 p)	Orlando Pirates	Polokwane
15:00 SAST				Stadium: Old Peter Mokaba Stadium

8 March 2025	Stellenbosch	1–3	Kaizer Chiefs	Gqeberha
18:00 SAST	de Jong 86'	Report	Miguel 20'; Mmodi 90+5'; Vilakazi 90+11'	Stadium: Nelson Mandela Bay Stadium

9 March 2025	Durban City	0–0 (1–4 p)	Marumo Gallants	Chatsworth
15:00 SAST				Stadium: Chatsworth Stadium

28 March 2025	Mamelodi Sundowns	1–0 (a.e.t.)	Sekhukhune United	Pretoria
	Adams 119'	Report		Stadium: Lucas Masterpieces Moripe Stadium

== Semi-finals ==
13 April 2025	Orlando Pirates	1–0	Marumo Gallants	Soweto
15:00 SAST	Dlamini 22'			Stadium: Orlando Stadium

13 April 2025	Mamelodi Sundowns	1–2	Kaizer Chiefs	Pretoria
18:00 SAST	Teboho Mokoena 45'		Wandile Duba 57' Ashley Du Preez 89'	Stadium: Loftus Versfeld Stadium

== Final ==
10 May 2025	Kaizer Chiefs	2–1	Orlando Pirates	Moses Mabhida Stadium, Durban
15:30	Sirino 16'; Maart 80'	Report	Makgopa 21'	Referee: Masixole Bambiso
