= Jason Gonzalez =

Jason Gonzalez may refer to:

- Jason Gonzalez (attorney)
- Jason Gonzalez (fighter)

== See also ==
- Jasond González, Colombian footballer
