= Mduduzi =

Mduduzi is a South African given name. Notable people with the name include:

- Mduduzi Mdantsane (born 1994), South African soccer player
- Mduduzi Manana (born 1984), South African politician
- Mduduzi Mabaso (born 1975), South African actor
- Mduduzi Fuzwayo (1986–2023), Zimbabwean cricketer
- Mduduzi Shabalala (born 2004), South African soccer player
- Mduduzi Bacede Mabuza, Swazi politician and pro-democracy activist

== See also ==
- Vincent Mduduzi Zungu (born 1966), South African Bishop of the Roman Catholic Church
