= Gape Moralo =

South African soccer player

Personal information
- Full name: Gape Trevor Moralo
- Date of birth: 6 February 2000 (age 26)
- Position: Midfielder

Team information
- Current team: SuperSport United
- Number: 38

Youth career
- 2018–2020: SuperSport United

Senior career*
| Years | Team | Apps | (Gls) |
| 2020– | SuperSport United | 25 | (1) |

International career
- South Africa U20
- * Club domestic league appearances and goals as of 13 July 2024

Gape Trevor Moralo (born 6 February 2000) is a South African soccer player who plays as a midfielder for SuperSport United in the South African Premier Division.

In 2018, Moralo joined the SuperSport United academy from the School of Excellence in Elandsfontein. He played for the reserve team in the Diski Challenge Shield, and played for South Africa U20. Moralo was brought into SuperSport United's first-team squad in August 2020. He was a replacement for Dean Furman in the postponed closing stages of the 2019-20 South African Premier Division.

Moralo made his SuperSport United debut in 2020, but up until 2023, Moralo started 48 games on the bench, seeing only a few minutes of game time. Moralo still played games for the Diski Challenge side. He was also a candidate for going out on loan.

He started his first games in 2023 and was also a substitute in a victory over Kaizer Chiefs. Moralo thus signed a new contract. He also played continental football in the 2023–24 CAF Confederation Cup group stage, but SuperSport United were eliminated. He scored his first league goal against Orlando Pirates in May 2024. He signed a new contract after the season, spanning two years.
