= Keletso Sifama =

South African footballer

Personal information
- Date of birth: 27 April 2003 (age 23)
- Place of birth: Katlehong, South Africa
- Height: 1.79 m (5 ft 10 in)
- Position: Midfielder

Team information
- Current team: Cape Town Spurs
- Number: 18

Youth career
- –2020: Kaizer Chiefs

Senior career*
Years	Team	Apps	(Gls)
2020–2023	Kaizer Chiefs	2	(0)
2021	→ Maritzburg United (loan)	4	(0)
2021-2022	→ Pretoria Callies (loan)	10	(2)
2023	→ Casric Stars (loan)	8	(1)
2023–2024	Sekhukhune United	5	(0)
2024–	Cape Town Spurs		

International career^{‡}
2022	South Africa	4	(1)
- * Club domestic league appearances and goals as of 10 September 2024 ‡ National team caps and goals as of 4 April 2024

Keletso Sifama (born 27 April 2003) is a South African soccer player currently playing as a midfielder for Cape Town Spurs.

He arrived at Chiefs in 2018, playing in the Gauteng Development League, before being promoted to the Reserve League Team under coach Arthur Zwane’s mentorship at the start of the season. He made his senior debut as a substitute coming on in the 86th minute of an exciting thrill-a-minute win over Polokwane City on Saturday, 15 August 2020.

He became the youngest player to debut at Kaizer Chiefs, breaking Wiseman Meyiwa's record of 17 years, 8 months and 17 days.

In 2022 he represented South Africa in the 2022 COSAFA Cup as well as a 2022 African Nations Championship qualification against Comoros. He scored his first international goal against Madagascar in the COSAFA consolation tournament, the "plate semi final".

Following loans to Maritzburg United, Pretoria Callies and Casric Stars he was released by Kaizer Chiefs in the summer of 2023. He signed for Sekhukhune United, but with the initial prospect of playing for their reserve team. He scored on his debut for Sekhukhune United's reserves in the Diski Challenge. In the summer of 2024 he went on to newly relegated second-tier club Cape Town Spurs.

== Career statistics ==
=== Club ===
As of 22 August 2020.

Club	Season	League			National Cup		League Cup		Continental		Other		Total	
Club	Season	Division	Apps	Goals	Apps	Goals	Apps	Goals	Apps	Goals	Apps	Goals	Apps	Goals
Kaizer Chiefs	2019–20	ABSA Premiership	2	0	0	0	0	0	0	0	0	0	2	0
Career total			2	0	0	0	0	0	0	0	0	0	2	0
