= Keagan Dolly =

South African soccer player (born 1993)

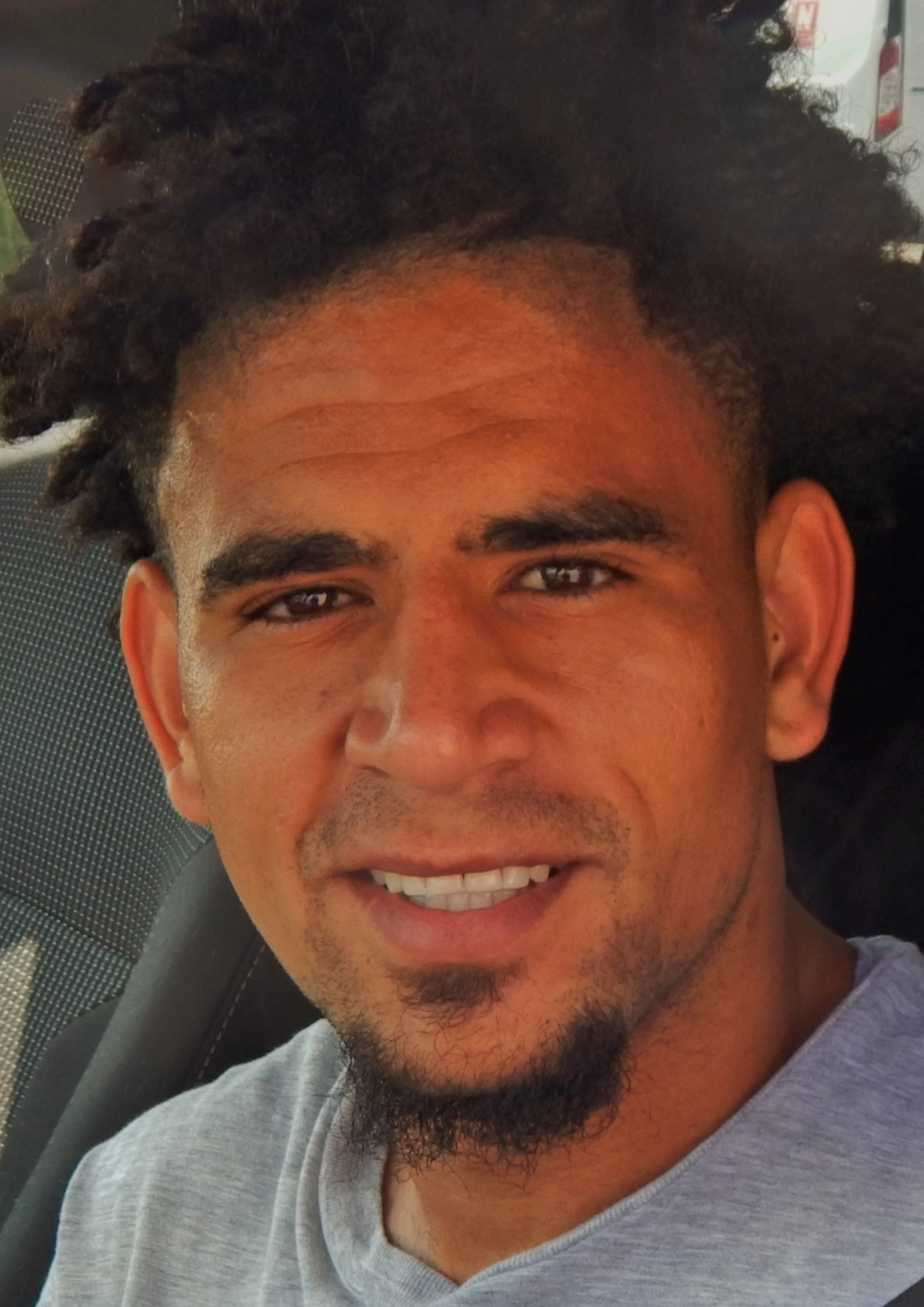
- Dolly while at Montpellier

Personal information
- Full name: Keagan Larenzo Dolly
- Date of birth: 22 January 1993 (age 33)
- Place of birth: Johannesburg, South Africa
- Height: 1.70 m (5 ft 7 in)
- Position: Attacking midfielder

Team information
- Current team: Hope F.C.
- Number: 40

Youth career
- Westbury Arsenal
- SAFA School of Excellence
- 2005–2011: Mamelodi Sundowns
- 2011–2012: Ajax Cape Town

Senior career*
Years	Team	Apps	(Gls)
2012–2014	Ajax Cape Town	41	(7)
2014–2017	Mamelodi Sundowns	48	(18)
2014–2015	→ Ajax Cape Town (loan)	18	(3)
2017–2021	Montpellier	58	(7)
2021–2024	Kaizer Chiefs	52	(18)
2024–	TS Galaxy	19	(5)
2025-26	Cape Town City		
2026-	Hope	2	(0)

International career^{‡}
2013–	South Africa	15	(2)
2015	South Africa U23	5	(0)
2016	South Africa Olympic	3	(0)
- * Club domestic league appearances and goals as of 10:29, 5 August 2024 (UTC) ‡ National team caps and goals as of 10:43, 4 October 2020 (UTC)

Keagan Larenzo Dolly (born 22 January 1993) is a South African professional soccer player who plays as an attacking midfielder for National First Division club Hope F.C. and the South Africa national team.

== Club career ==
=== Mamelodi Sundowns ===
Born in Johannesburg, Gauteng, Dolly started playing football at Westbury Arsenal, then later he moved to School of Excellence where he was spotted by Mamelodi Sundowns. After impressing at their youth structures he went on to sign with Ajax Cape Town.

=== Ajax Cape Town ===
Dolly completed a move to Ajax Cape Town and this is perhaps where Dolly made a reputation for himself. During a spell at Ajax he won the Premier Soccer League Young Player award for the 2013–14 season. This triggered Sundowns to buy him back from Ajax Cape Town for their 2014–15 season, but because of many players occupying the same position as Keagan during that season, Sundowns opted to loan him back to Ajax for the player to get more playing time.

=== Return to Mamelodi Sundowns ===
Sundowns included Dolly to their squad for the 2015–16 campaign as they intended to bolster their team for the league and for the CAF champions league. Dolly with Sundows went on to win the league for the 2015–16 season, and they automatically qualified for the CAF champions league. Sundowns were eliminated by AS Vita Club in the third round of the Caf Champions league but with the turn of events AS Vita Club were eliminated in the competition due to the finding that they had used an ineligible player during the preliminary matches of the 2016 Orange CAF Champions League. Sundowns were reinstated to the competition and with the outstanding performances from Dolly and the whole team, Sundowns went on to win the competition. Dolly, Billiat and Onyango were nominated for best African Inter-Club Player of the Year (Based in Africa) of which was won by Keagan's teammate Dennis Onyango. Dolly was included in the 2016 CAF Team of the year. With outstanding performances from Dolly it eventually attracted interests from various clubs in Europe. In September 2016 it was announced that Olympiacos F.C. were interested in signing Dolly.

==== Contract dispute with Mamelodi Sundowns ====
In November 2016, it was reported that Sundowns had taken their star midfielder to the PSL Dispute Resolution Chamber (PSL DRC) to contest a buyout clause of around €750,000 that was written into his contract, that was signed 17 months prior which Sundowns stated it was too low. The argument was that a mistake was made by Sundowns, and that they wanted it to be rectified to an amount around £1.5 million. Sundowns eventually won the case and the buyout clause was updated to £1.5 million.

=== Montpellier ===
On 26 January 2017, it was announced that Dolly had signed with Montpellier HSC. He left the club in summer 2021.

Dolly while at Montpellier

=== Kaizer Chiefs ===
Dolly returned to South Africa in July 2021, joining Kaizer Chiefs. On 25 June 2024, public broadcaster SABC reported that Dolly, along with teammates Sifiso Hlanti and Siyethemba Sithebe, would be leaving the club upon the expiration of his contract at the end of the month.

=== TS Galaxy ===
Dolly signed for TS Galaxy on a deal until the end of the season.

=== Cape Town City ===
In August 2025 Cape Town City signed Dolly on a free transfer. however, he struggled for minutes and at the end of the season he was released alongside Njabulo Ngcobo, Dženan Zajmović, Sifiso Ngobeni and Siphamandla Dondolo

=== Hope FC ===
On the 31st of August Dolly signed for National First Division club Hope F.C. Dolly made his debut on the 5th of September in a 1-0 away win against NWU

== International career ==
Dolly played for the under 23's and represented his country during the 2015 Africa U-23 Cup of Nations tournament which was held in Senegal. The tournament acted as the CAF qualifiers for the Olympic football tournament, of which South Africa qualified as the third-place country. Dolly captained the South African side during the 2016 Summer Olympics men's football tournament.

== Style of play ==
Dolly primarily plays as either a winger or occasionally as an attacking midfielder, he often plays as a left sided winger for both club and country. Due to his energetic pace and playmaking skills; this position allows him to shoot with his stronger foot. The diminutive left-footed player is capable of occupying any position behind the forward line. His extreme pace and close control allows him to roam into pockets of space around the pitch in the same way as Manchester United playmaker Juan Mata. Former South African playmaker Steven Pienaar had also tipped Dolly on becoming one of the best exports that South Africa has ever produced.

== Personal life ==
Like Steven Pienaar, Dolly hails from Westbury, a largely coloured township in Johannesburg. He was educated at the prestigious Potchefstroom High School for Boys .

== Career statistics ==
Scores and results list South Africa's goal tally first, score column indicates score after each Dolly goal.

List of international goals scored by Keagan Dolly
No.	Date	Venue	Opponent	Score	Result	Competition
1	4 June 2016	Independence Stadium, Bakau, Gambia	Gambia	3–0	4–0	2017 Africa Cup of Nations qualification
2	4 June 2016	Independence Stadium, Bakau, Gambia	Gambia	4–0	4–0	2017 Africa Cup of Nations qualification

== Honours ==
Mamelodi Sundowns

- Telkom Knockout: 2015
- Premier Soccer League: 2015–16
- CAF Champions League: 2016

South Africa U23

- Africa U-23 Cup of Nations third place: 2015

Individual

- PSL Young Player of the Season: 2013–14
- CAF Team of the Year
