= Fiacre Ntwari =

Rwandan footballer (born 1999)

Personal information
- Date of birth: 25 September 1999 (age 27)
- Place of birth: Musanze District, Rwanda
- Height: 1.94 m (6 ft 4 in)
- Position: Goalkeeper

Team information
- Current team: Kaizer Chiefs

Youth career
- APR

Senior career*
Years	Team	Apps	(Gls)
2016–2017	Intare		
2017–2021	APR		
2020–2021	→ Marines (loan)		
2021–2023	AS Kigali		
2023–2024	TS Galaxy	29	(0)
2024–	Kaizer Chiefs	15	(0)

International career^{‡}
2021–	Rwanda	17	(0)
- * Club domestic league appearances and goals as of 30 July 2024 ‡ National team caps and goals as of 30 July 2024

Fiacre Ntwari (born 25 September 1999) is a Rwandan soccer player who plays as a goalkeeper for Kaizer Chiefs in the South African Premier Division.

== Career ==
Ntwari was born in Musanze District. He made a journey to Kigali, where he joined APR's academy and played for Intare. He also spent time on loan at Marines.

After some time with AS Kigali, Ntwari became a free agent in the summer of 2023. There were talks about moving to the Linafoot. Meanwhile, Tim Sukazi who owns South African club TS Galaxy allegedly watched Ntwari play against Benin during the 2023 Africa Cup of Nations qualification. Nonetheless, TS Galaxy was the club to sign Ntwari. Here, he gradually won the goalkeeper spot. From 18 starts he kept 8 clean sheets. TS Galaxy also finished a record 6th in the league. In the summer of 2024 he was signed by one of South Africa's Big 3, Kaizer Chiefs who wanted to strengthen the goalkeeper position.
