= Jason Gonzalez (attorney) =

American lawyer (born 1973)

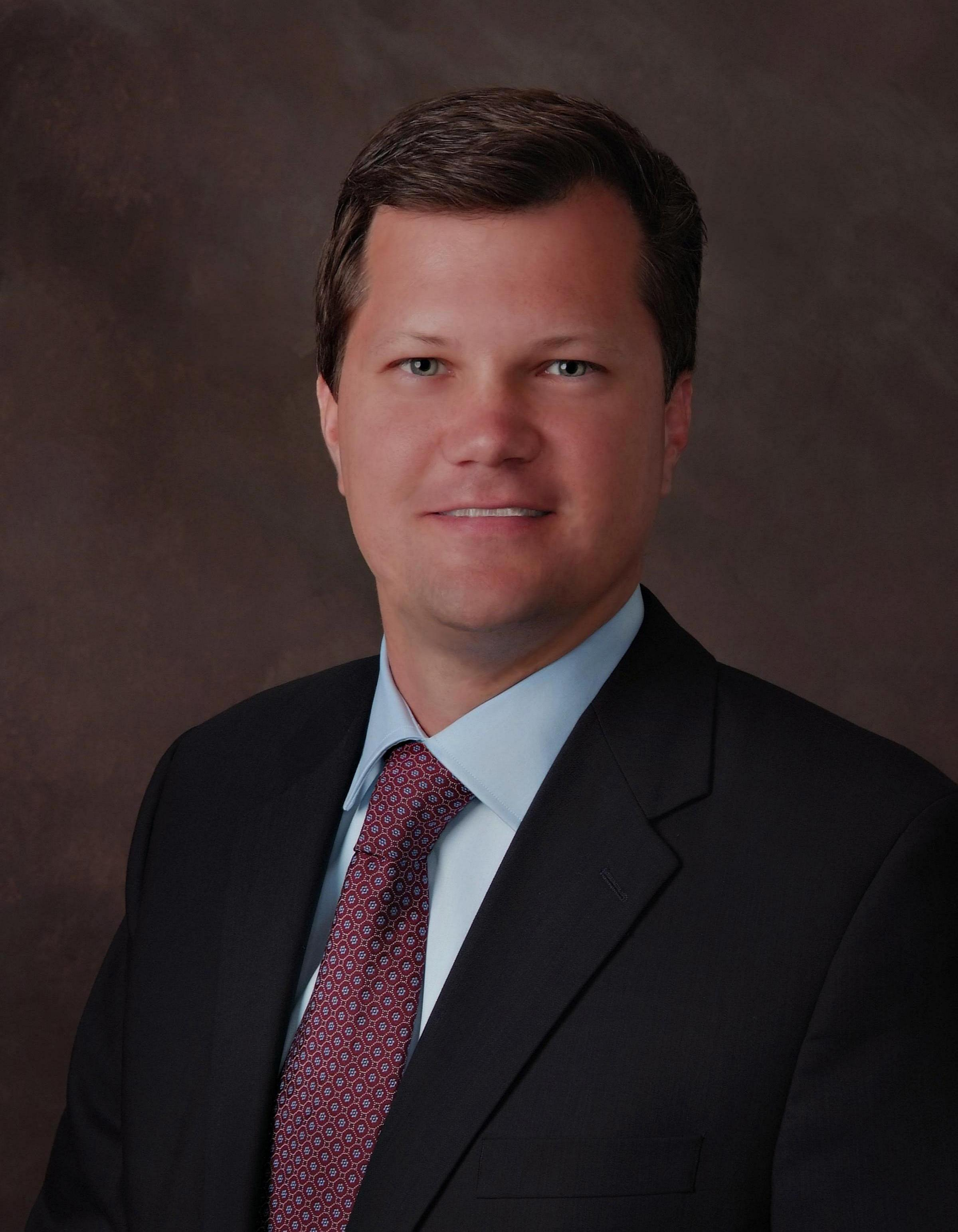
Jason Gonzalez

Jason Gonzalez (born September 30, 1973) is an attorney in Tallahassee, Florida. He is credited with reshaping the Florida Supreme Court while serving as General Counsel to the Governor of Florida. He was the chief advisor to the Governor on the appointment of four Florida Supreme Court Justices.

== Early life and family ==
Jason Gonzalez was born in Tallahassee, Florida, the son of Larry Gonzalez (former Secretary of the Florida Department of Professional Regulations and Director of the Florida Commission on Ethics) and Jean Gonzalez. Gonzalez attended the University of Florida. He became an attorney in 1998. He is married to married Sara Hicks Gonzalez, they have three children.

=== General Counsel to the Republican Party of Florida ===
Gonzalez has served two terms as General Counsel to the Republican Party of Florida, and has attended four Republican National Conventions with the Florida delegation (1988, 2008, 2012 and 2016).

=== The Deepwater Horizon Litigation ===
In 2010, immediately following the explosion and sinking of the Deepwater Horizon, the vessel's owner, Transocean Ltd., selected Gonzalez to serve as its lead counsel for litigation and state regulatory matters in the Florida Panhandle. Over a two-year period, Mr. Gonzalez successfully obtained orders dismissing or removing every one of the more than 70 individual and class action lawsuits filed against Transocean in Florida.

== Public service ==
=== Judicial Nominating Commissions ===
In 2007 the Florida Governor appointed Gonzalez to the Judicial Nominating Commission for the Florida Supreme Court. Gonzalez previously served terms as Chairman of the Judicial Nominating Commission for the First District Court of Appeal of Florida and Chairman of the Judicial Nominating Commission for the Second Judicial Circuit of Florida.

=== General Counsel to the Governor ===
Jason Gonzalez was appointed General Counsel to the Governor of Florida in 2008. As General Counsel he was the chief advisor to the Governor on all legal matters and served as the Governor's Chief Ethics Officer and chief advisor on judicial appointments. In 2008-2009 Gonzalez was the chief advisor to the Governor on the appointments of four Florida Supreme Court Justices. The four appointments marked the first time in Florida history in which a Governor appointed a majority of the Court in less than a year.
