= Luke Baartman =

South African soccer player

Personal information
- Full name: Luke Junio Baartman
- Date of birth: 12 June 2006 (age 20)
- Height: 1.72 m (5 ft 8 in)
- Positions: Striker; attacking midfielder

Team information
- Current team: Kaizer Chiefs
- Number: 11

Youth career
- –2023: Cape Town Spurs

Senior career*
Years	Team	Apps	(Gls)
2023–2025	Cape Town Spurs	21	(5)
2025–	Kaizer Chiefs	13	(1)

International career^{‡}
2023	South Africa U17	2	(0)
2025	South Africa U20	3	(0)
- * Club domestic league appearances and goals as of 15:58, 14 November 2026 (UTC) ‡ National team caps and goals as of 15:58, 14 November 2026 (UTC)

Luke Junio Baartman (born 12 June 2006) is a South African professional soccer player who plays as a striker or attacking midfielder for Kaizer Chiefs.

== Club career ==
Baartman was raised in Elsie's River in the Cape Flats, and joined Cape Town Spurs's academy aged 12. He survived a shooting in May 2023, as he was grazed in the leg by a bullet in Cape Town. After six goals in the first five matches of the 2023–24 season for the Cape Town Spurs reserve team, he was given a first-team debut in October 2023 against Orlando Pirates in the Carling Knockout Cup. He scored his first goal the following month in a 3–2 South African Premier Division defeat to Kaizer Chiefs. He went on to score twice in 9 matches in the 2023–24 Premier Division, and thrice in 12 matches in the 2024–25 National First Division, as Spurs were relegated in both seasons and were set to play in the amateur third tier for the 2025–26 season.

Baartman alongside fellow Spurs youngster Asanele Velebayi signed for Kaizer Chiefs in summer 2025, after the relegation to amateur football voided their contracts at Spurs, though these signings were not finalised until October due to a legal dispute between the clubs. He made his debut for Kaizer Chiefs in December 2025.

== International career ==
He has played for South Africa U17 at the 2023 U-17 Africa Cup of Nations, and South Africa U20 at the 2025 FIFA U-20 World Cup.

== Style of play ==
Baartman has been compared by former Cape Town Spurs technical director Sean Connor to Henrik Larsson. His finishing ability, off-the-ball movement and skill have been highlighted as important features of his game. Whilst he has played largely as a striker for Kaizer Chiefs, former coach Benson Mhlongo claimed he was better suited to playing as an attacking midfielder where he was often used for Cape Town Spurs.
