= Lebohang Lesako =

South African soccer player

Personal information
- Date of birth: 3 July 1999 (age 27)
- Place of birth: Tshepiso, Vanderbijlpark, South Africa
- Position: Midfielder

Team information
- Current team: Orbit College

Senior career*
Years	Team	Apps	(Gls)
2020–2025	Kaizer Chiefs	3	(0)
2021–2022	→ Uthongathi (loan)	22	(1)
2022	→ Moroka Swallows (loan)	2	(0)
2023–2025	→ Casric Stars (loan)	45	(7)
2025–	Orbit College	6	(0)

International career^{‡}
2025–	Lesotho	3	(1)
- * Club domestic league appearances and goals as of 3 April 2026 ‡ National team caps and goals as of 3 April 2026

Lebohang Lesako (born 3 July 1999) is a soccer player who plays as a midfielder for South African Premier Division club Orbit College and the Lesotho national team.

== Club career ==
He made his debut for Kaizer Chiefs on 24 October 2020 in a 3–0 home defeat to Mamelodi Sundowns in the South African Premier Division.

== Career statistics ==
=== International ===
As of match played 29 March 2026

Appearances and goals by national team and year
National team	Year	Apps	Goals
Lesotho	2025	1	0
Lesotho	2026	2	1
Total		3	1

As of match played 29 March 2026

List of international goals scored by Lebohang Lesako
No.	Date	Venue	Cap	Opponent	Score	Result	Competition	Ref.
1	29 March 2026	Free State Stadium, Bloemfontein, South Africa	3	Seychelles	2–1	2–1	2027 Africa Cup of Nations qualification	
