= Thabani Dube =

South African soccer player

Personal information
- Full name: Austin Thabani Dube
- Date of birth: 16 November 1992 (age 33)
- Height: 1.84 m (6 ft 0 in)
- Position: Defender

Team information
- Current team: Richards Bay
- Number: 99

Senior career*
Years	Team	Apps	(Gls)
2016–2018	Witbank Spurs	18	(2)
2018–2020	TS Galaxy	40	(2)
2019–2020	Richards Bay	30	(5)
2021–2023	Kaizer Chiefs	17	(0)
2023–	Richards Bay	22	(1)

International career^{‡}
2021–	South Africa	6	(0)
- * Club domestic league appearances and goals as of 1 August 2024 ‡ National team caps and goals as of 18 July 2021

Austin Thabani Dube (born 16 November 1992) is a South African professional soccer player who plays as a defender for South African club Richards Bay. He has been capped for the South African national soccer team

== Club career ==
Dube played for Witbank Spurs F.C. before joining a Mpumalanga-based PSL team TS Galaxy F.C. Austin Dube joined a South African football team Richards Bay F.C. for 2020/21 season in the National First Division where he made 6 appearances and scored 1 goal.

On 20 July 2021, Dube signed a three-year contract with Kaizer Chiefs.

== International career ==
He made his debut for South Africa national soccer team on 6 July 2021 in a 2021 COSAFA Cup game against Botswana. South Africa won the tournament.
