= Sibongiseni Mthethwa =

South African soccer player

Personal information
- Date of birth: 20 September 1994 (age 32)
- Place of birth: Estcourt, South Africa
- Height: 1.86 m (6 ft 1 in)
- Position: Midfielder

Team information
- Current team: Kaizer Chiefs
- Number: 5

Senior career*
Years	Team	Apps	(Gls)
2020	Royal Eagles	6	(0)
2020–2022	Black Leopards	42	(0)
2022–2023	Stellenbosch	41	(0)
2023–	Kaizer Chiefs	45	(0)

International career^{‡}
2022–	South Africa	13	(0)
- * Club domestic league appearances and goals as of 4 January 2026 ‡ National team caps and goals as of 7 July 2023

Sibongiseni "Ox" Mthethwa (born 20 September 1994) is a South African soccer player who plays as a midfielder for Kaizer Chiefs in the Premier Soccer League.

== Club career ==
Playing for the Black Leopards and being relegated from the 2020-21 South African Premier Division, Mthethwa was signed by first-tier team Stellenbosch in the winter of 2022.

Following a good start of the 2022-23 South African Premier Division campaign, he was suggested for a callup to Bafana Bafana. Only three Stellenbosch players had been called up before, these being Athenkosi Mcaba, Antonio van Wyk and Jayden Adams. The callup came for two friendly matches in September 2022. He featured in one of the games, against Botswana. Mthethwa was subsequently called up to the 2023 COSAFA Cup as well.

Nearing the end of the season, several clubs were linked with buying Mthethwa, including Kaizer Chiefs and AmaZulu. Stellenbosch manager Steve Barker was reluctant to sell to a South African club, but was "not going to stand in the way when a European team comes in for one of our players, and he's got an opportunity to play at a higher level".

On 21 September 2023, with just two days remaining of the transfer window, Mthethwa signed for Kaizer Chiefs on a three-year deal.

== Personal life ==
Mthethwa is nicknamed Ox. He hails from Estcourt.

== Honours ==
South Africa

- Africa Cup of Nations third place: 2023

Kaizer Chiefs

- Nedbank cup 2024/2025
- Cufa Cup:2024
- Home of Legends Cup:2024
