= Sihle Nduli =

South African soccer player (born 1995)

Personal information
- Date of birth: 10 October 1995 (age 31)
- Position: Midfielder

Team information
- Current team: Orlando Pirates
- Number: 30

Senior career*
| Years | Team | Apps | (Gls) |
| 2017–2018 | Cape Town All Stars | 4 | (0) |
| 2018 | Witbank Spurs | 11 | (0) |
| 2018–2022 | TS Galaxy | 77 | (0) |
| 2022–2025 | Stellenbosch | 62 | (0) |
| 2025— | Orlando Pirates | 10 | (0) |
- * Club domestic league appearances and goals as of 3 January 2026

Sihle Nduli (born 10 October 1995) is a South African soccer player who plays as a midfielder for Orlando Pirates in the South African Premiership.

In 2018, the club TS Galaxy bought a First Division license and built a new squad. Sihle Nduli became a part of that squad, and stayed in the club for four years. After TS Galaxy entered the highest league, Nduli made his first-tier debut in the 2020-21 South African Premiership.

Nduli was signed by another Premiership team Stellenbosch in the summer of 2022. He helped Stellenbosch win its first trophy, the 2023 Carling Knockout Cup, beating TS Galaxy in the final. By the early 2024–25 season, Nduli was known as a consistent performer and several reports were made about transfer interest from Kaizer Chiefs, as well as a concrete bid. His contract with Stellenbosch F.C would expire in the summer of 2025.

In June 2025 Sihle Nduli was announced as an Orlando Pirates player and was handed jersey number 30

== Honours ==
Orlando Pirates

- MTN 8: 2025
