= William Likuta =

Congolese footballer

Personal information
- Full name: William Likuta Luezi
- Date of birth: 23 August 1997 (age 29)
- Position: Winger

Team information
- Current team: AS Vita Club

Senior career*
Years	Team	Apps	(Gls)
2018–2019	AC Ujana		
2019–2022	DC Motema Pembe		
2022–2023	Stellenbosch	5	(0)
2024	AS Otoho		
2024–2025	OC Bukavu Dawa		
2025–	AS Vita Club	1	(0)

International career^{‡}
2021	DR Congo	1	(0)
- * Club domestic league appearances and goals as of 12 June 2023 ‡ National team caps and goals as of 12 June 2023

William Likuta Luezi (born 23 August 1997) is a Congolese soccer player who last played as a winger for AS Vita Club in the Illicocash Ligue 1.

Likuta grew up in the AC Ujana academy and their senior team. In 2019 he joined bigger Congolese team DC Motema Pembe, and had made his breakthrough by September 2019. He was regarded as performing well on the continental club level too. Likuta participated in three CAF Confederation Cups with Motema Pembe. He also made his debut for DR Congo, being selected for the 2020 African Nations Championship and playing against Libya.

In July 2022 he was signed by Stellenbosch in the South African Premier League. He was sparingly used by Stellenbosch, however, and was released from the club in January 2023. For the time being, Likuta would stay in South Africa to opt for another club there.
