= Inácio Miguel =

Angolan footballer

Personal information
- Full name: Inácio Miguel Ferreira dos Santos
- Date of birth: 12 December 1995 (age 30)
- Place of birth: Torres Vedras, Portugal
- Height: 1.85 m (6 ft 1 in)
- Positions: Defensive midfielder; centre back

Team information
- Current team: Kaizer Chiefs
- Number: 84

Youth career
- 2005–2009: Ericeirense
- 2009–2013: Mafra
- 2013–2014: Gil Vicente

Senior career*
Years	Team	Apps	(Gls)
2014–2015	Vila Real	23	(1)
2015–2016	Felgueiras 1932	29	(0)
2016–2019	Braga B	57	(3)
2019–2021	Universitatea Cluj	29	(0)
2021–2022	Mafra	28	(0)
2022	Liepāja	15	(2)
2023–2024	Petro de Luanda	25	(4)
2024–	Kaizer Chiefs	34	(1)

International career^{‡}
2020–	Angola	6	(0)
- * Club domestic league appearances and goals as of 1 January 2026 ‡ National team caps and goals as of 1 January 2026

Inácio Miguel Ferreira dos Santos (born 12 December 1995), known as Inácio Miguel, is a professional footballer who plays as a defensive midfielder or a centre back for South African club Kaizer Chiefs. Born in Portugal, he represents the Angola national team.

== Club career ==
On 28 September 2016, Inácio made his professional debut with Braga B in a 2016–17 LigaPro match against Aves.

On 30 June 2019 Inácio Miguel signed a contract with Liga II club Universitatea Cluj.

On 21 June 2021, he returned to Mafra.

== International career ==
On 22 September 2020, Inácio Miguel was called up by the senior Angola national football team. He made his debut on 13 October 2020 as a halftime substitution during a friendly match against Mozambique. He won four caps in 2021.
