= Bongani Sam =

South African soccer player

Personal information
- Full name: Bongani Ngele Sam
- Date of birth: 30 July 1997 (age 29)
- Place of birth: Motherwell, Port Elizabeth
- Height: 1.71 m (5 ft 7 in)
- Position: Left-back

Youth career
- Highlands Park

Senior career*
Years	Team	Apps	(Gls)
2017–2019	Highlands Park	8	(1)
2019	Bloemfontein Celtic	21	(1)
2019–2023	Orlando Pirates	17	(1)
2022	→ Maritzburg United (loan)	9	(1)
2023–2024	Moroka Swallows	22	(1)
2024–2025	Kaizer Chiefs	0	(0)

International career^{‡}
2019	South Africa	1	(0)
- * Club domestic league appearances and goals as of 23:24, 4 December 2025 (UTC) ‡ National team caps and goals as of 19 July 2021

Bongani Sam (born 30 July 1997) is South African professional soccer player who plays as a left-back for Kaizer Chiefs.
