= Mark van Heerden =

South African cricketer (born 1991)

Personal information
- Born: 27 March 1982 (age 44); Johannesburg, South Africa
- Source: Cricinfo, 1 December 2020

Mark van Heerden (born 21 February 1991) is a South African cricketer. He played in nine first-class and two Twenty20 matches for Boland in 2013 and 2014.

== See also ==
- List of Boland representative cricketers
