= Nhlanhla Mgaga =

South African soccer player

Personal information
- Date of birth: 3 April 1996 (age 30)
- Position: Midfielder

Team information
- Current team: TS Galaxy
- Number: 12

Senior career*
Years	Team	Apps	(Gls)
2018–2020	Tshakhuma Tsha Madzivhandila	43	(8)
2020–2022	Baroka	51	(1)
2022–2024	Stellenbosch	48	(1)
2024–	TS Galaxy	35	(0)
- * Club domestic league appearances and goals as of 4 January 2026

Nhlanhla Mgaga (born 3 April 1996) is a South African soccer player who plays as a midfielder for South African Premier Division side TS Galaxy.

== Club career ==
After playing for Tshakhuma Tsha Madzivhandila in the National First Division, he joined Baroka on a three-year contract in January 2020. He scored his first goal for the club on 24 October 2020; a long-range finish off the post in a 2–1 victory over Maritzburg United.
