= Sabelo Radebe =

South African association football player

Sabelo Radebe(Bhibo)
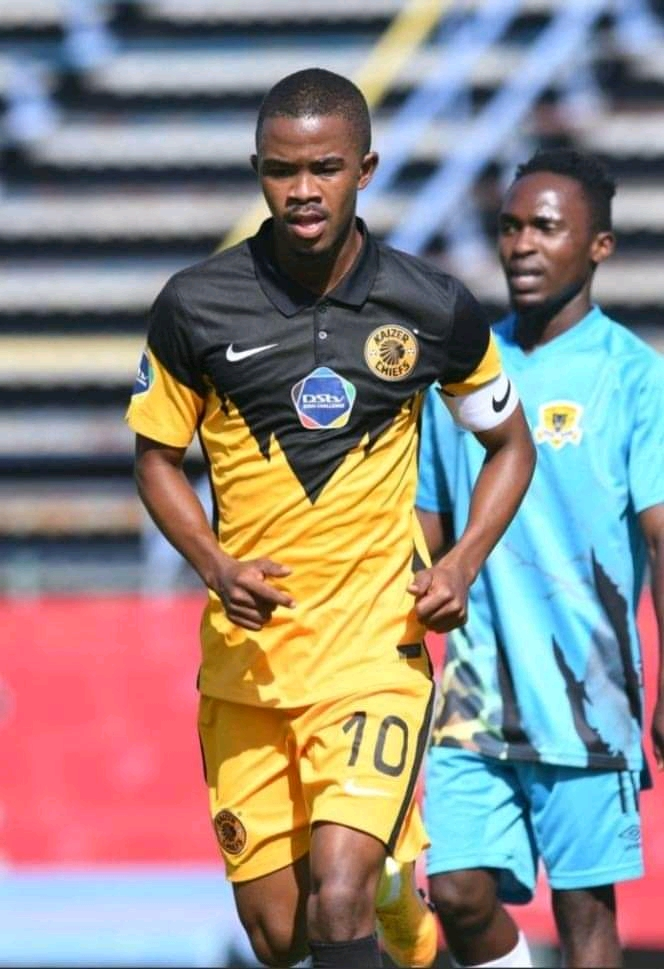
- Radebe playing against Black Leopards Reserves in 2021

Personal information
- Full name: Sabelo Radebe
- Date of birth: 3 February 2000 (age 26)
- Place of birth: Soweto, Johannesburg, South Africa
- Height: 5 ft 6 in (1.67 m)
- Positions: Attacking midfielder; winger

Team information
- Current team: Kaizer Chiefs
- Number: 33

Senior career*
Years	Team	Apps	(Gls)
2021–2025	Kaizer Chiefs	17	(0)
- * Club domestic league appearances and goals as of 30 June 2024

Sabelo Radebe (born 3 February 2000) is a South African soccer player who played as an attacking midfielder or winger for South African Premier Division side Kaizer Chiefs.

Sabelo Radebe made his debut against Orlando Pirates when they won 4–3 on penalties in a match that ended in a 1–1 draw.
