= Wandile Duba =

South African soccer player

Personal information
- Date of birth: 27 June 2004 (age 22)
- Place of birth: Mkhondo, Mpumalanga, South Africa
- Position: Striker

Team information
- Current team: Kaizer Chiefs
- Number: 47

Youth career
- Jozi Stars
- Kaizer Chiefs

Senior career*
Years	Team	Apps	(Gls)
2022–	Kaizer Chiefs	55	(11)
- * Club domestic league appearances and goals as of 7 September 2026

Wandile Duba (born 27 June 2004) is a South African soccer player who plays as a striker for Kaizer Chiefs in the Premier Soccer League.

Duba was born in eMkhondo. He was taken into the Kaizer Chiefs academy and performed well for their reserve team in the Diski Challenge Shield. As a consequence he made his first-team debut in the 2022-23 South African Premier Division against the Golden Arrows on 31 December 2022. He scored his first goal on 5 March 2024 on same match, which happened to be his first match to as staring 11 for Kaizer Chiefs.
