= Brandon Petersen =

South African soccer player

Personal information
- Date of birth: 22 September 1994 (age 32)
- Place of birth: Cape Town, South Africa
- Height: 6 ft 2 in (1.87 m)
- Position: Goalkeeper

Team information
- Current team: Kaizer Chiefs
- Number: 1

Youth career
- Trinitarians
- Ajax Cape Town

Senior career*
Years	Team	Apps	(Gls)
2013–2019	Ajax Cape Town	62	(0)
2019–2020	Bidvest Wits	11	(0)
2021–	Kaizer Chiefs	52	(0)
- * Club domestic league appearances and goals as of 4 January 2026

Brandon Petersen (born 22 September 1994) is a South African professional soccer player who plays as a goalkeeper for Kaizer Chiefs in the Premier Soccer League.

== Honours ==
Kaizer Chiefs

- 2024 Cufa Cup:2024
- 2024 Home of Legends Cup:2024
- Nedbank Cup:2025 Nedbank Cup
