= Zitha Macheke =

South African soccer player (born 1994)

Zitha Kwinika
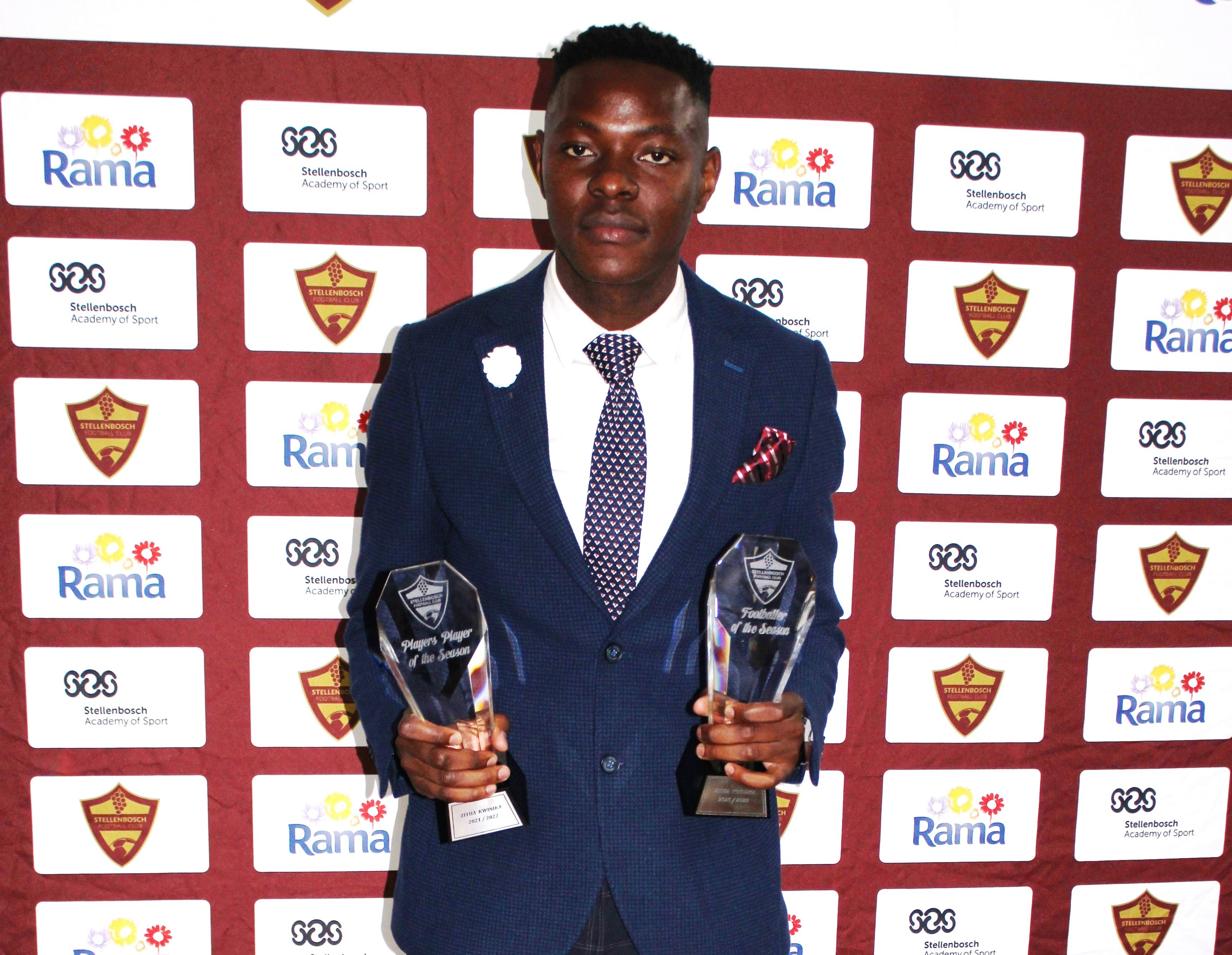

Personal information
- Full name: Alton Zitha Kwinika
- Date of birth: 4 January 1994 (age 32)
- Place of birth: Meadowlands, South Africa
- Height: 1.79 m (5 ft 10 in)
- Position: Defender

Team information
- Current team: Kaizer Chiefs
- Number: 4

Youth career
- –2014: Kaizer Chiefs

Senior career*
Years	Team	Apps	(Gls)
2014–2016	Kaizer Chiefs	0	(0)
2015–2016	→ Chippa United (loan)	13	(0)
2016–2019	Chippa United	53	(0)
2016–2017	→ Thanda Royal Zulu (loan)	29	(1)
2019–2020	Bidvest Wits	24	(0)
2020–2022	Stellenbosch	55	(1)
2022–	Kaizer Chiefs	51	(1)

International career^{‡}
2015	South Africa U23	1	(0)
- * Club domestic league appearances and goals as of 4 January 2026 ‡ National team caps and goals as of 22:54, 21 October 2020 (UTC)

Alton Zitha Kwinika (born 4 January 1994) is a South African soccer player who plays as a defender for South African Premier Division side Kaizer Chiefs.

== Early life ==
Macheke was born in Meadowlands.

== Club career ==
He started his career at Kaizer Chiefs, and was promoted to their first team in 2014. He joined Chippa United on a season-long loan in summer 2015, before joining the club on a two-year deal after his contract at Chiefs expired in 2016. He joined Thanda Royal Zulu on loan for the 2016–17 season. He joined Bidvest Wits in July 2019, and made 24 appearances for the club, before signing for Stellenbosch in summer 2020. At the end of the 2021/22 season, he was named as Stellenbosch FC's Footballer of the Year and Players' Player of the Year before completing a return to boyhood club, Kaizer Chiefs.

== International career ==
He has represented South Africa at under-23 level, playing at the 2015 Africa U-23 Cup of Nations.

== Honours ==
Kaizer Chiefs

- Absa Premiership:2014/15
- Cufa Cup:2024
- Home of Legends Cup:2024
- Nedbank Cup:2025
