= Yusuf Maart =

South African soccer player

Personal information
- Full name: Moegamat Yusuf Maart
- Date of birth: 17 July 1995 (age 31)
- Place of birth: Atlantis, Western Cape
- Height: 1.70 m (5 ft 7 in)
- Positions: Defensive midfielder; attacking midfielder

Team information
- Current team: SV Ried
- Number: 6

Youth career
- 2016–2017: Orlando Pirates

Senior career*
Years	Team	Apps	(Gls)
2017–2020	Orlando Pirates	1	(0)
2018–2019	→ Cape Umoya United (loan)	16	(3)
2020–2022	Sekhukhune United	35	(6)
2022–2025	Kaizer Chiefs	79	(3)
2025–	SV Ried	30	(0)

International career^{‡}
2021–	South Africa	6	(1)
- * Club domestic league appearances and goals as of 10 June 2026 ‡ National team caps and goals as of 24 September 2021

Moegamat Yusuf Maart (born 17 July 1995) is a South African soccer player who recently played as an attacking midfielder for South African Premiership club Kaizer Chiefs and the South Africa national team, now playing for Austrian club SV Ried. He is regarded as one of the best midfielders in South Africa.

== Club career ==
=== Orlando Pirates ===
Maart was born in Cape Town and grew up in Atlantis. He was scouted by Orlando Pirates in 2016 after being named player of the tournament at that year's SAB U-21 national championships. He initially joined the club's reserve team but made his first team debut on 12 March 2017 as a substitute in their 3–1 win over EC Bees in the Nedbank Cup. He made his league debut later that season as a substitute in a 2–1 defeat to Lamontville Golden Arrows on 27 May 2017. Maart spent the 2018–19 season on loan with Cape Umoya United, where he scored once in 16 league matches. He was released by Pirates in summer 2020.

=== Sekhukhune United ===
Maart joined Sekhukhune United of the National First Division after he was released by Pirates. He played a pivotal role in the club's promotion to the South African Premiership that season, scoring three times in 28 league appearances.

=== Kaizer Chiefs ===
Maart scored the 80th-minute winner in the 2024–25 Nedbank Cup final against former club and rivals Orlando Pirates F.C to help Chiefs win their first title in a decade.

== International career ==
Maart was called up to the South African national team squad for the 2021 COSAFA Cup. He scored his first international goal on 16 July 2021 in a COSAFA Cup semi-final victory over Mozambique, and played in the final as Maart won the tournament following a 6–5 penalty shoot-out victory over Senegal. He made 6 appearances and scored one goal during the 2021 COSAFA Cup.

== Career statistics ==
=== International ===
As of match played 9 June 2022

Appearances and goals by national team and year
National team	Year	Apps	Goals
South Africa	2021	8	1
South Africa	2022	1	0
Total		9	1

Scores and results list South Africa's goal tally first, score column indicates score after each Maart goal.

List of international goals scored by Yusuf Maart
No.	Date	Venue	Opponent	Score	Result	Competition
1	16 July 2021	Nelson Mandela Bay Stadium, Gqeberha, South Africa	Mozambique	2–0	3–0	2021 COSAFA Cup
