= Monnapule Saleng =

South African professional soccer player

Personal information
- Full name: Monnapule Kenneth Saleng
- Date of birth: 13 March 1998 (age 28)
- Place of birth: Bloemhof, North West
- Height: 1.77 m (5 ft 10 in)
- Position: Right winger

Team information
- Current team: Mamelodi Sundowns
- Number: 14

Youth career
- 2017–2019: Orbit College

Senior career*
Years	Team	Apps	(Gls)
2019–2021	Free State Stars	51	(14)
2021–2025	Orlando Pirates	52	(21)
2021–2022	→ Moroka Swallows (loan)	22	(2)
2025	→ Orbit College F.C.(loan)	16	(2)
2026–	Mamelodi Sundowns	8	(0)

International career^{‡}
2021–	South Africa	15	(1)
- * Club domestic league appearances and goals as of 2026 ‡ National team caps and goals as of 2023

Monnapule Saleng (born 13 March 1998 ) is a South African professional soccer player who plays as a winger for Mamelodi Sundowns F.C and the South Africa national team.

He was named MTN 8 Last Man Standing and DSTV Premiership Players' Player Of The Season at the 2023 PSL Awards.

== Club career ==
Having started his career at Orbit College in the SAFA Second Division, Saleng joined Free State Stars in 2019. He was the top scorer in the 2020–21 National First Division, scoring 13 goals in 29 matches.

=== Orlando Pirates ===
Saleng signed for South African Premier Division club Orlando Pirates in July 2021, but spent the 2021–22 season on loan at Moroka Swallows, where he scored twice in 22 league appearances. He returned to Pirates for the 2022–23 season, where he became a first-team regular, scoring five goals in eight matches in the opening half of the season. He was loaned to former club Orbit College during the first half of the 2025/26 season after they got promoted to the premiership.

=== Mamelodi Sundowns ===
In January 2026 Saleng signed for South African Premier Division club Mamelodi Sundowns.

== International career ==
Saleng was part of the South Africa squad at the 2021 COSAFA Cup, starting in the opening 1–0 victory against Botswana. In total, he made 6 appearances as South Africa won the tournament.

In November 2022, Saleng was included in the South Africa squad for two friendly fixtures against Angola and Mozambique.

== Career statistics ==
As of 2024

Appearances and goals by club, season and competition
Club	Season	League			Nedbank Cup		MTN8		Continental (Note: Appearance(s) in CAF Champions League.)		Other		Total	
Club	Season	Division	Apps	Goals	Apps	Goals	Apps	Goals	Apps	Goals	Apps	Goals	Apps	Goals
Moroka Swallows FC	2021–22	South African Premier Division	22	2	2	0	1	0	–	–	4	0	29	2
Orlando Pirates	2022–23	South African Premier Division	22	11	5	1	3	3	–	–	–		30	15
Orlando Pirates	2023–24	South African Premier Division	17	3	4	1	4	1	1	0	1	0	27	5
Orlando Pirates	Total		39	14	9	2	7	4	1	0	1	0	56	20
Career total			61	16	11	2	8	4	1	0	5	0	86	22

== Honours ==
Mamelodi Sundowns

- CAF Champions League: 2025–26
