= Jasond González =

Colombian footballer (born 1999)

Personal information
- Full name: Efmamjjasond González Palacios
- Date of birth: 12 June 1999 (age 27)
- Place of birth: Arboletes, Colombia
- Height: 1.89 m (6 ft 2 in)
- Position: Forward

Team information
- Current team: Nantong Zhiyun
- Number: 14

Youth career
- Atlético Nacional
- 2019–2020: San Lorenzo

Senior career*
Years	Team	Apps	(Gls)
2020–2022	San Lorenzo	0	(0)
2020–2021	→ All Boys (loan)	30	(2)
2022	→ San Miguel (loan)	14	(0)
2023–2025	Real Santa Cruz	16	(8)
2023–2024	→ Kaizer Chiefs (loan)	7	(0)
2025–2026	Always Ready	13	(11)
2025	→ Shijiazhuang Gongfu (loan)	12	(5)
2026	→ Beitar Jerusalem (loan)	15	(2)
2026–	Nantong Zhiyun	0	(0)
- * Club domestic league appearances and goals as of 23 June 2026

Efmamjjasond González Palacios (born 12 June 1999), known as Jasond González, is a Colombian professional footballer who plays as a forward for Nantong Zhiyun.

== Career ==
González started his career with Atlético Nacional in Colombia. In February 2019, González had a trial in Argentina with San Lorenzo; under Jorge Almirón, who noticed him whilst managing Atlético Nacional in 2018. He remained until September, when the forward signed his first professional contract with the club. He scored his first reserve goal in the succeeding October against Central Córdoba. On 26 November 2020, González headed out on loan to Primera B Nacional with All Boys; penning terms until December 2021. His senior debut arrived two days after signing in a goalless draw away to Brown.

González scored his first senior goal on 5 December 2020, for All Boys, against Santamarina at the Estadio Islas Malvinas.

Gonzalez's salary at Kaizer Chiefs per month is R220,000. This would put his annual earnings at R2,640,000.

On 13 July 2025, González was loaned to China League One club Shijiazhuang Gongfu from Always Ready.

On 2 July 2026, González returned to China and joined China League One club Nantong Zhiyun.

== Personal life ==
González's first name, Efmamjjasond, comes from the first letter of every month in Spanish: enero, febrero, marzo, abril, mayo, junio, julio, agosto, septiembre, octubre, noviembre and diciembre. This is because his parents "like the twelve months of the year". Due to pronunciation difficulties, he goes by Jasond. He has been called "Goleador del Calendario", meaning "calendar goal-scorer".

== Career statistics ==
As of 17 August 2023

Appearances and goals by club, season and competition
Club	Season	League			Cup		League Cup		Continental		Other		Total	
Club	Season	Division	Apps	Goals	Apps	Goals	Apps	Goals	Apps	Goals	Apps	Goals	Apps	Goals
San Lorenzo	2020–21 (Note: Soccerway counts Copa de la Liga Profesional appearances as league appearances.)	Primera División	0	0	0	0	0	0	—		0	0	0	0
All Boys (loan)	2020	Primera B Nacional	6	1	0	0	—		—		0	0	6	1
All Boys (loan)	2021	Primera Nacional	24	1	0	0	—		—		0	0	24	1
All Boys (loan)	Total		30	2	0	0	0	0	0	0	0	0	30	2
San Miguel	2022	Primera B Metropolitana	14	0	0	0	—		—		0	0	14	0
Real Santa Cruz	2023	Bolivian Primera División	16	8	4	0	—		—		0	0	20	8
Career total			60	10	4	0	0	0	—		0	0	64	10
