= Arthur Zwane =

South African soccer player

Personal information
- Full name: Arthur Jabulani Zwane
- Date of birth: 20 September 1973 (age 53)
- Place of birth: Meadowlands, South Africa
- Position: Midfielder

Youth career
- 1981–1982: Liverpool
- 1983–1991: Jomo Cosmos
- 1992: Mahwereleng Real Rovers

Senior career*
Years	Team	Apps	(Gls)
1992–1996	Jomo Cosmos	10	(0)
1996	Santos	2	(0)
1996–1997	Orlando Pirates	12	(0)
1997	Jomo Cosmos	5	(0)
1997–1998	Amazulu	0	(0)
1998–1999	Dynamos	2	(0)
1999–2000	Tembisa Classic	30	(8)
2000–2010	Kaizer Chiefs	193	(46)
Total		254	(33)

International career
1993	South Africa U20	4	(2)
2000–2005	South Africa	8	(0)

Managerial career
- 2021,2023-24: Kaizer Chiefs (Assistant)
- 2020-2021: Kaizer Chiefs (Caretaker Manager)
- 2021-22: Kaizer Chiefs (manager)
- 2023-24: Kaizer Chiefs (Head of Academy Coaching)
- 2024-: AmaZulu FC (Manager)
- * Club domestic league appearances and goals

Arthur Jabulani Zwane (born 20 September 1973) better known as "10111" is a South African professional football coach and former player. He spent most of his career with Kaizer Chiefs, and was their head coach from May 2022 to June 2023.

Born in Meadowlands, South Africa, Zwane is one of the most decorated players to ever wear Amakhosi colours in South African football. He won multiple major trophies, including the Premier Soccer League, MTN8, and Nedbank cup.

== Early career ==
Zwane grew up playing for his uncle's team, Liverpool, and later played for Jomo Cosmos's under 10 side. He was promoted in 1992 and was sent on loan to Real Rovers.

== Club career ==
=== Jomo Cosmos ===
Arthur Zwane made his professional debut in the BobSave Super Bowl quarter final against Giyani Classic in 1993 under Roy Matthews. Zwane continued to play for Cosmos after being relegated in 1993. He won the NSL Second Division with Cosmos in 1994.

=== Orlando Pirates ===
Zwane played 12 matches at Orlando Pirates before being sent on loan to Dynamos in the National First Division.

=== Tembisa Classic ===
Zwane played for Tembisa Classic under Khabo Zondo. He scored eight goals in the 1999/2000 to help the team to a 9th-place finish.

=== Kaizer Chiefs ===
Zwane joined Chiefs in 2000 after a tug of war battle between Pirates claiming Zwane as their player and Chiefs claiming Lesley Manyathela as their own. He made his debut on 22 July 2000 in a 1–0 win over Wits University. Zwane won three trophies during "Operation Vat Alles" in 2000/01. He scored his first goal on 8 August 2004 in a 2–1 win over Manning Rangers. In 2004, he was banned for 2 years after testing positive for Methyltestosterone, an anabolic steroid. The ban was later reduced to six months. He played his last match on 4 November 2009 against Mpumalanga Black Aces.

== Coaching career ==
On 27 May 2021, Zwane joined Kaizer Chiefs as the team's assistant manager. He served the position during the 2020/2021 season. On 9 June 2021, he was appointed as the team's caretaker manager. On 26 May 2022, he signed a new contract as the team's manager. He served as Kaizer Chiefs manager until June 2023.
