= Pule Mmodi =

South African soccer player

Personal information
- Full name: Pule Sydney Mmodi
- Date of birth: 23 February 1993 (age 33)
- Place of birth: Theunissen, South Africa
- Height: 1.70 m (5 ft 7 in)
- Positions: Midfielder; winger

Team information
- Current team: Kaizer Chiefs
- Number: 13

Senior career*
Years	Team	Apps	(Gls)
2018–2020	Uthongathi	57	(7)
2020–2023	Lamontville Golden Arrows	55	(16)
2023–	Kaizer Chiefs	55	(4)

International career^{‡}
2022–	South Africa	3	(0)
- * Club domestic league appearances and goals as of 4 January 2026 ‡ National team caps and goals as of 31 March 2024

Pule Mmodi (born 23 February 1993) is a South African soccer player who plays as a winger for Kaizer Chiefs in the Premier Soccer League.

He signed for Uthongathi in 2018 as a part of a large influx of new players. While he played for Uthongathi, it was reported that Doctor Khumalo scouted him for Kaizer Chiefs. He was instead picked up by Lamontville Golden Arrows for the belated start of the 2020-21 South African Premier Division. The club described him as a "very tricky, quick and skillful attacking midfielder".

Mmodi's first callup to the South African national team was hampered by his not having a passport, as he had never imagined he would travel outside South Africa. He later received more call-ups, and played two friendly matches in 2022 and one in 2023. Making his first-tier debut at the age of 27 and impressing in 2021–22, he was also called a "late bloomer".

In September 2022, before the closing of the summer transfer window, Mmodi was nearing a transfer to Kaizer Chiefs. It fell through because Chiefs would not meet the Arrows' asking price. The Arrows' manager commented him for remaining dedicated to the club.

However, Mmodi's contract would expire in the summer of 2023. AmaZulu voiced their interest in the player. Rumours ensued about a swap deal with Kaizer Chiefs during the winter transfer window. The transfer to Kaizer Chiefs finally took place in the summer of 2023. Mmodi attracted attention for changing his player agent on the same day his contract with Golden Arrows had expired and he signed for Kaizer Chiefs.

In his home debut, he also scored his first goal.
