= Phathutshedzo Nange =

South African soccer player

Personal information
- Date of birth: 11 December 1991 (age 34)
- Height: 1.80 m (5 ft 11 in)
- Position: Midfielder

Team information
- Current team: Marumo Gallants
- Number: 14

Senior career*
Years	Team	Apps	(Gls)
2014–2019	Black Leopards	91	(15)
2019–2020	Bidvest Wits	22	(2)
2020–2021	Stellenbosch	23	(4)
2021–2023	Kaizer Chiefs	27	(2)
2023–2024	SuperSport United	7	(0)
2024–	Marumo Gallants	1	(0)
- * Club domestic league appearances and goals as of 30 September 2024

Phathutshedzo Nange (born 11 December 1991) is a South African soccer player who plays as a midfielder for South African Premier Division side Marumo Gallants.
