= Edmilson Dove =

Mozambican footballer

Personal information
- Full name: Edmilson Gabriel Dove
- Date of birth: 18 July 1994 (age 32)
- Place of birth: Tavene, Gaza, Mozambique
- Positions: Midfielder; defender

Youth career
- 2008: Giral Sol FC
- 2010: Clube de Gaza
- 2011–2012: Grupo Desportivo de Tavene
- 2013–2015: Ferroviário de Maputo

Senior career*
Years	Team	Apps	(Gls)
2015–2017	Ferroviário de Maputo	36	(2)
2017–2022	Cape Town City	83	(4)
2022	U.D.Songo	6	(0)
2022–2025	Kaizer Chiefs	44	(2)
2025–	Al-Quwa Al-Jawiya		

International career^{‡}
2015–	Mozambique	51	(0)
Medal record
Men's football
Representing Mozambique
COSAFA Cup
Bronze medal – third place	2024 South Africa
- * Club domestic league appearances and goals as of 22 June 2026 ‡ National team caps and goals as of 19 July 2026

Edmilson Gabriel Dove (born 18 July 1994) is a Mozambican professional footballer who plays for Mozambique national team. He primarily plays as a defender, but has also played as a midfielder.

== Club career ==
Hailing from the town of Tavene in the Gaza Province, Dove played with various youth teams before arriving at Ferroviário de Maputo in 2013. He made his debut with the first team during the 2015 season, winning a league title in his first year.

In May 2016, Dove traveled to Lisbon to undergo a trial with Portuguese club Sporting CP.

In January 2017, he was signed by South African Premier Division club Cape Town City to provide defensive depth after the exit of Aubrey Modiba, their first-choice left-back. Dove initially caught their attention after an international friendly between Mozambique and South Africa that past November. He made his professional debut on 7 February, during a 3–0 victory over Highlands Park. In just his fourth appearance with the team, a win over Baroka, he was named man of the match after providing an assist to Sibusiso Masina. The Star described his play by saying that "in just four games, he's taken the ABSA Premiership by storm."

== International career ==
Dove was first called up to the Mozambique national team for the 2015 COSAFA Cup, making his debut in their quarter-finals victory over Malawi. His team finished as tournament runners-up, with Dove playing the full 90 minutes in the final against Namibia.

He earned four caps for Mozambique during the 2016 African Nations Championship qualification, playing in both legs against Seychelles and Zambia before Mozambique got knocked out of the tournament.

Dove was also called up to the national team for the 2017 Africa Cup of Nations qualifiers, appearing in three games in Group H before Mozambique was eliminated.

== Career statistics ==
=== International ===
As of match played 9 June 2026.

National team	Year	Apps	Goals
Mozambique	2015	7	0
Mozambique	2016	6	0
Mozambique	2017	2	0
Mozambique	2018	6	0
Mozambique	2019	5	0
Mozambique	2020	–	
Mozambique	2021	1	0
Mozambique	2022	5	0
Mozambique	2023	7	0
Mozambique	2024	4	0
Mozambique	2025	6	0
Mozambique	2026	2	0
Total		51	0

== Honours ==
=== Club ===
Ferroviário de Maputo

- Moçambola: 2015

Cape Town City

- MTN 8: 2018

Kaizer Chiefs

- Cufa Cup:2024
- Home of Legends Cup:2024

Al-Quwa Al-Jawiya

- Iraq Stars League: 2025–26

=== International ===
Mozambique

- COSAFA Cup: 2015 runners-up
