= Júnior Mendieta =

Argentine footballer

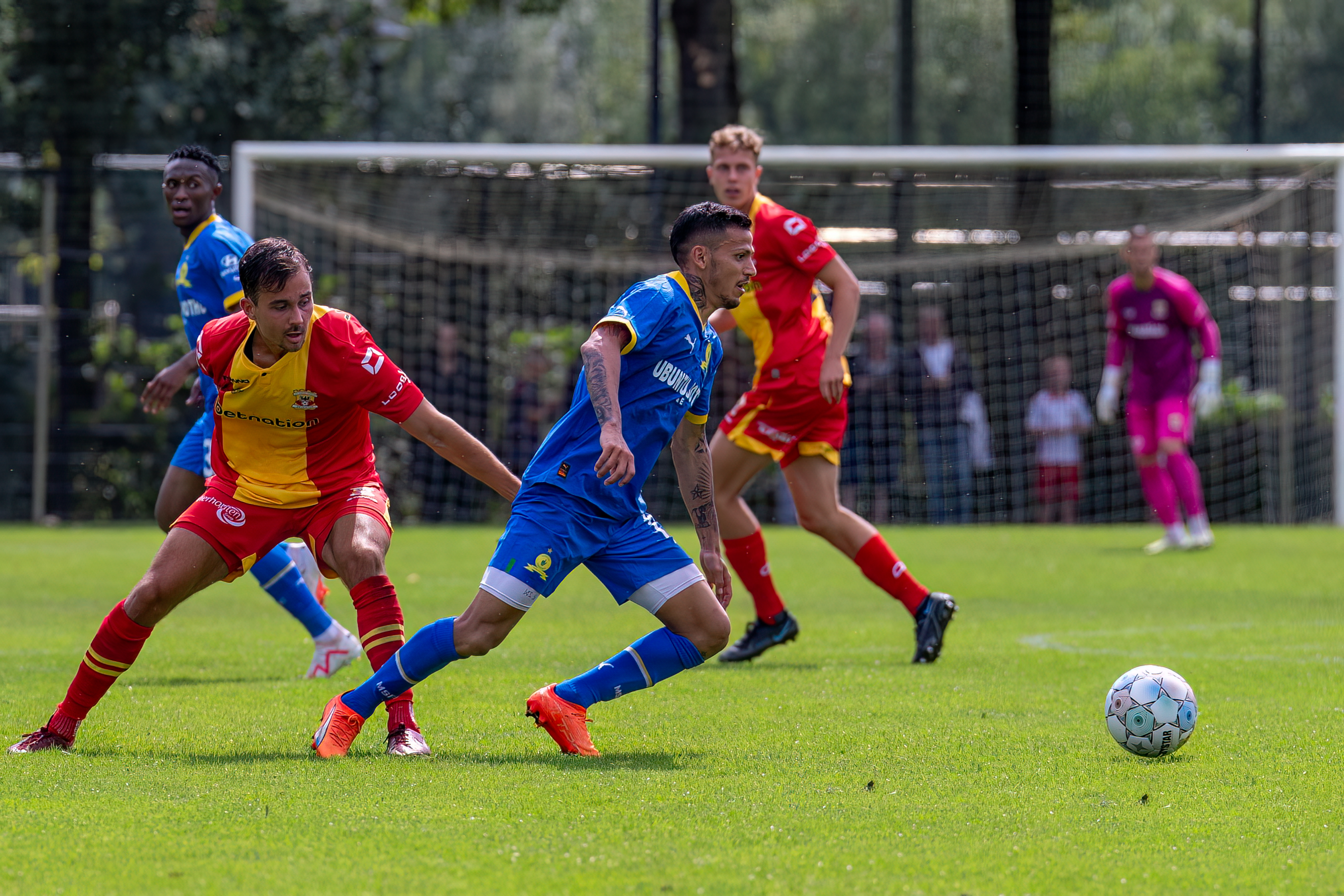
- Mendieta (blue shirt, 2023)

Personal information
- Full name: Júnior Leandro Mendieta
- Date of birth: 13 June 1993 (age 33)
- Place of birth: Corrientes, Argentina
- Height: 1.70 m (5 ft 7 in)
- Position: Midfielder

Team information
- Current team: Anagennisi Karditsa
- Number: 32

Youth career
- Quilmes
- –2015: Deportivo Morón

Senior career*
Years	Team	Apps	(Gls)
2015–2016	Deportivo Morón	34	(14)
2016–2020	Lanús	0	(0)
2016–2018	→ Los Andes (loan)	45	(11)
2018–2019	→ Deportivo Morón (loan)	19	(5)
2019–2020	→ Atlético de Rafaela (loan)	18	(3)
2020–2021	→ Stellenbosch (loan)	21	(3)
2021–2023	Stellenbosch	51	(11)
2023–2024	Mamelodi Sundowns	18	(2)
2024–2025	Volos	15	(4)
2025	Al-Faisaly	15	(4)
2025–2026	Asteras Tripolis	16	(0)
2026–	Anagennisi Karditsa	0	(0)
- * Club domestic league appearances and goals as of 14 June 2026

Júnior Leandro Mendieta (born 13 June 1993) is an Argentine professional footballer who plays as a midfielder for Super League Greece 2 club Anagennisi Karditsa.

== Club career ==
Mendieta started his senior career with Deportivo Morón in Primera B Metropolitana, having played for Quilmes at youth level. His professional debut arrived on 14 February 2015 during a draw with Deportivo Merlo, prior to Mendieta receiving red cards in consecutive appearances in August against Defensores de Belgrano and Platense. A month later, he scored his senior goal against Almagro. Mendieta scored twice more that year, which preceded six goals in fourteen games in the next campaign. On 30 June 2016, Argentine Primera División side Lanús signed Mendieta. He was immediately loaned to Los Andes.

Mendieta remained with Los Andes for the 2016–17 and 2017–18 Primera B Nacional seasons, scoring seven times in forty-six matches in all competitions. After returning to Lanús in June, Mendieta subsequently agreed to rejoin Deportivo Morón; signing a loan contract. He netted twice for Morón, both came in a fixture with Instituto in November 2018, across nineteen appearances. Mendieta had a third loan spell away from Lanús in 2019–20, joining Atlético de Rafaela for twelve months in July 2019. One goal in eighteen matches followed, in a campaign that was curtailed due to the COVID-19 pandemic.

Mendieta's contract with Lanús expired on 30 June 2020, with the midfielder subsequently revealing that a potential move to South African Premier Division side Stellenbosch was being finalized; amid interest from Rafaela for a permanent contract. The move to Africa was belatedly confirmed on 30 October. His first appearance arrived on 4 November against SuperSport United, as he replaced Jayden Adams with twenty-five minutes left of an eventual 1–0 defeat. He scored his first goal on 21 November versus Chippa United, before netting his second on 12 February against Golden Arrows.

On 31 January 2025, Mendieta joined Saudi First Division League club Al-Faisaly.

== International career ==
Mendieta received a call-up to the Argentina U23s for the 2016 Sait Nagjee Trophy in India. However, due to contractual issues, he was deselected prior to the tournament.

== Personal life ==
In 2017, Mendieta was arrested by police after trespassing at Morón Air Base. He was released without charge soon later, having claimed he accidentally entered the base after becoming lost.

== Career statistics ==
As of 16 July 2021.

Club statistics
Club	Season	League			Cup		League Cup		Continental		Other		Total	
Club	Season	Division	Apps	Goals	Apps	Goals	Apps	Goals	Apps	Goals	Apps	Goals	Apps	Goals
Deportivo Morón	2015	Primera B Metropolitana	21	1	0	0	—		—		4 (Note: Appearance(s) in Primera B Metropolitana play-offs)	2	25	3
Deportivo Morón	2016	Primera B Metropolitana	13	6	1	0	—		—		0	0	14	6
Deportivo Morón	Total		34	7	1	0	—		—		4	2	39	9
Lanús	2016–17	Primera División	0	0	0	0	—		0	0	0	0	0	0
Lanús	2017–18	Primera División	0	0	0	0	—		0	0	0	0	0	0
Lanús	2018–19	Primera División	0	0	0	0	0	0	0	0	0	0	0	0
Lanús	2019–20	Primera División	0	0	0	0	0	0	0	0	0	0	0	0
Lanús	Total		0	0	0	0	0	0	0	0	0	0	0	0
Los Andes (loan)	2016–17	Primera B Nacional	25	6	1	0	—		—		0	0	26	6
Los Andes (loan)	2017–18	Primera B Nacional	20	1	0	0	—		—		0	0	20	1
Los Andes (loan)	Total		45	7	1	0	—		—		0	0	46	7
Deportivo Morón (loan)	2018–19	Primera B Nacional	19	2	0	0	—		—		0	0	19	2
Atlético de Rafaela (loan)	2019–20	Primera B Nacional	18	1	0	0	—		—		0	0	18	1
Stellenbosch (loan)	2020–21	Premier Division	21	3	1	0	—		—		0	0	22	3
Career total			141	22	3	0	0	0	0	0	4	2	148	24

== Honours ==
Mamelodi Sundowns

- African Football League: 2023
- Premier Soccer League: 2023-24
