= Chatsworth Stadium =

Stadium in Durban, South Africa

- Interactive map of Chatsworth Stadium
- Location: Chatsworth, Durban
- Coordinates: 29°54′37″S 30°52′38″E
- Capacity: 22,000

Construction
- Opened: 1989

Tenant
- Durban City

Chatsworth Stadium is a multi-purpose stadium in Durban, South Africa. It is currently used mostly for soccer matches. From 2024, Durban City play their home games there, while previously it hosted Royal AM F.C.

From 1985 until their bankruptcy in 2006 it was the home of Manning Rangers, the champions of the inaugural season of the Premiership in the Premier Soccer League era.
