= Mduduzi Shabalala =

South African soccer player

Personal information
- Date of birth: 20 January 2004 (age 22)
- Place of birth: Soweto
- Height: 1.63 m (5 ft 4 in)
- Positions: Attacking midfielder; left winger; right winger

Team information
- Current team: Kaizer Chiefs
- Number: 7

Youth career
- Kaizer Chiefs

Senior career*
Years	Team	Apps	(Gls)
2022–	Kaizer Chiefs	96	(15)

International career^{‡}
2020–2021	South Africa U17		
2022–	South Africa U20		
2023–	South Africa U23		
2025–	South Africa	2	(0)
- * Club domestic league appearances and goals as of 13 October 2026 ‡ National team caps and goals as of 14 September 2026

Mduduzi "Mdu Or Die" Shabalala (born 20 January 2004) is a South African soccer player who plays as a midfielder for Kaizer Chiefs in the South African Premier Division.

Shabalala grew up as an Orlando Pirates supporter, but joined the Soweto rivals Kaizer Chiefs at age 18. He had played in the Lenasia Football Academy.

After winning the 2020 COSAFA Under-17 Championship, he went on trial with Villarreal CF. After impressing for Kaizer Chiefs' Diski Challenge Shield team in 2021–22, Shabalala went on trial with KVC Westerlo, and was given his first-team debut against Moroka Swallows in May 2022. According to iDiski Times, Westerlo also made a bid for the player, but the negotiations with the Chiefs broke down.

Shabalala did not win the 2022 COSAFA U-20 Cup with South Africa, which also acted as the 2023 U-20 Africa Cup of Nations qualification, but was named in the Team of the Tournament. He was formally promoted to Kaizer Chiefs's senior team on 1 December 2022.

Shabalala was called "a standout player" during the winter part of the 2022-23 South African Premier Division. During the 2023-24 South African Premier Division, Shabalala played semi-regularly, but did not establish himself as a key player yet. The team also struggled in mid-table.
