= Njabulo Ngcobo =

South African soccer player (born 1994)

Personal information
- Date of birth: 27 May 1994 (age 32)
- Place of birth: Folweni, KwaZulu-Natal, South Africa
- Height: 1.80 m (5 ft 11 in)
- Position: Defender

Team information
- Current team: Siwelele
- Number: 80

Youth career
- –2016: AmaZulu

Senior career*
Years	Team	Apps	(Gls)
2016–2019	AmaZulu	20	(0)
2017–2019	→ Richards Bay (loan)	35	(0)
2019–2020	Uthongathi	40	(2)
2020–2021	Moroka Swallows	28	(1)
2021–2024	Kaizer Chiefs	38	(1)
2024–2025	Sekhukhune United	0	(0)
2025-2026	Cape Town City	3	(0)
2026-	Siwelele	1	(0)

International career^{‡}
2021–	South Africa	4	(1)
- * Club domestic league appearances and goals as of 13 July 2023 ‡ National team caps and goals as of 12 July 2021

Njabulo Ngcobo (born 27 May 1994) is a South African professional soccer player. He is a defender for South African club Siwelele and the South African national team. Ngcobo was named the PSL Defender of the Season in 2021.

== Club career ==
Ngcobo first started playing for Flamingo fc in uMzumbe SAFA Ugu Region, as a midfielder; he left there for Amazulu Academy after Matric.

Ngcobo is a youth product of the academy of AmaZulu, having made his senior debut in 2016 before he was loaned to Richards Bay. Njabulo joined Moroka Swallows in the 2020–21 season, where he made 28 appearances.

On 4 July 2021, Ngcobo signed a three-year contract with Kaizer Chiefs.

== International career ==
He made his debut for South Africa national soccer team on 13 July 2021 in a 2021 COSAFA Cup game against Lesotho. South Africa won the tournament, and Ngcobo score a goal in a semifinal victory over Mozambique.
