= Nkosingiphile Ngcobo =

South African footballer

Personal information
- Full name: Nkosingiphile Nhlakanipho Ngcobo
- Date of birth: 16 November 1999 (age 26)
- Place of birth: Pietermaritzburg, South Africa
- Position: Midfielder

Team information
- Current team: Kaizer Chiefs
- Number: 12

Youth career
- AmaRoto
- 2014–2019: Kaizer Chiefs

Senior career*
Years	Team	Apps	(Gls)
2019–	Kaizer Chiefs	84	(8)

International career
2016–2019	South Africa U20	15	(1)
- * Club domestic league appearances and goals as of 9 September 2025

Nkosingiphile Nhlakanipho Ngcobo (born 16 November 1999), nicknamed Mshini is a South African footballer who plays for Kaizer Chiefs.

== International career ==
Ngcobo was a youth international for South Africa, having been called up for 2016 COSAFA U-20 Cup, 2017 COSAFA U-20 Cup and later the 2019 Africa U-20 Cup of Nations, where he was named to the CAF Best XI.
