= Siyethemba Sithebe =

South African soccer player

Personal information
- Birth name: Siyethemba Mnguni
- Date of birth: 6 January 1993 (age 33)
- Place of birth: Newcastle, South Africa
- Position: Attacking midfielder

Team information
- Current team: Richards Bay

Senior career*
Years	Team	Apps	(Gls)
2015–2017	Mbombela United	40	(5)
2017–2022	AmaZulu	121	(8)
2022–2024	Kaizer Chiefs	33	(0)
2024–	Richards Bay	0	(0)

International career^{‡}
2020–	South Africa	8	(0)
- * Club domestic league appearances and goals as of 18 August 2024 ‡ National team caps and goals as of 23 October 2022

Siyethemba Sithebe (born Siyethemba Mnguni; 6 January 1993) is a South African soccer player who plays as an attacking midfielder for South African Premier Division side Richards Bay and the South Africa national team. In 2018, he changed his surname from Mnguni to Sithebe.

== Club career ==
In the summer of 2017, he signed for AmaZulu from Mbombela United.

== International career ==
He made his international debut for South Africa on 8 October 2020 in a 1–1 draw with Namibia.
