= Christian Saile =

Congolese footballer (born 1999)

Personal information
- Full name: Christian Saile Basomboli
- Date of birth: 30 November 1999 (age 26)
- Position: Forward

Team information
- Current team: Supersport United

Senior career*
Years	Team	Apps	(Gls)
- Saint-Éloi Lupopo
–2023	Nchanga Rangers		
2023–	Kaizer Chiefs	43	(6)
2025–	Supersport United(loan)	1	(1)
- * Club domestic league appearances and goals as of 30 June 2024

Christian Saile Basomboli (born 30 November 1999) is a Congolese professional footballer who plays as a forward for South African Premiership side Supersport United.

== Career ==
Having previously played for Saint-Éloi Lupopo in DR Congo, Christian Saile played for Nchanga Rangers in the Zambia National Division One during the 2021–22 season, scoring 19 goals as the club were promoted to the Zambia Super League. Having scored 8 goals in as many games at the start of the 2022–23 season, he joined South African Premier Division side Kaizer Chiefs on trial in December 2022. He signed for Chiefs on a three-and-a-half-year deal the following month, and provided an assist for Ashley Du Preez in his debut for the club after coming on as a substitute in their 2–0 win over Royal AM on 29 January. He scored his first goal on his full debut for the club in a 2–0 Nedbank Cup win over Maritzburg United. He also scored twice in 13 appearances during the 2022–23 South African Premiership.

== Style of play ==
Saile is a left-footed striker, who is also comfortable playing as a winger, on both the left and right wings.
