= Sifiso Hlanti =

South African soccer player

Personal information
- Full name: Sifiso Sandile Hlanti
- Date of birth: 1 May 1990 (age 36)
- Place of birth: Durban, South Africa
- Height: 1.81 m (5 ft 11 in)
- Position: Left back

Team information
- Current team: Kaizer Chiefs
- Number: 23

Senior career*
Years	Team	Apps	(Gls)
2011–2012	Lamontville Golden Arrows	2	(0)
2012	Chippa United		
2012–2013	Thanda Royal Zulu	23	(1)
2013–2016	AmaZulu	41	(0)
2016–2020	Bidvest Wits	118	(3)
2020–2021	Moroka Swallows	16	(1)
2021–	Kaizer Chiefs	25	(3)

International career^{‡}
2016–	South Africa	22	(0)
- * Club domestic league appearances and goals as of 18:01, 3 April 2023 (UTC) ‡ National team caps and goals as of 13:47, 9 July 2021 (UTC)

Sifiso Sandile Hlanti (born 1 May 1990) is a South African professional soccer player who plays for Kaizer Chiefs as a left back.

== Club career ==
Born in Durban, Hlanti has played for Lamontville Golden Arrows, Chippa United, Thanda Royal Zulu, AmaZulu, Bidvest Wits and Moroka Swallows.

In September 2020 he began training with Kaizer Chiefs, despite the club being under a transfer ban. He was one of 6 players to sign for the club on 9 July 2021, following the lifting of the transfer ban.

== International career ==
He made his international debut for South Africa in 2016. After playing in a match at the 2019 Africa Cup of Nations, Hlanti's Wikipedia entry was the subject of vandalism.

== Career statistics ==
=== International ===
As of matches played on 12 July 2019

South Africa national team
Year	Apps	Goals
2016	2	0
2017	5	0
2018	5	0
2019	6	0
Total	18	0
