= Mduduzi Mdantsane =

South African soccer player (born 1994)

Personal information
- Date of birth: 13 December 1994 (age 31)
- Place of birth: Leandra, South Africa
- Height: 1.67 m (5 ft 6 in)
- Position: Midfielder

Team information
- Current team: Kaizer Chiefs
- Number: 3

Senior career*
Years	Team	Apps	(Gls)
2017–2019	Baroka	72	(8)
2019–2023	Cape Town City	94	(20)
2023—	Kaizer Chiefs	13	(0)

International career^{‡}
2021–	South Africa	1	(0)
- * Club domestic league appearances and goals as of 30 June 2024 ‡ National team caps and goals as of 11 November 2021

Mduduzi Mdantsane (born 13 December 1994) is a South African soccer player who plays as a midfielder for South African Premier Division side Kaizer Chiefs FC.

== Early life ==
Mduduzi was born in Leandra on 13 December 1994.

== International career ==
He made his debut for South Africa national soccer team on 11 November 2021 in a World Cup qualifier against Zimbabwe.

== Honours ==
Kaizer Chiefs

- Cufa Cup:2024
- Home of Legends Cup:2024
