= Ashley Du Preez =

South African soccer player

Personal information
- Full name: Ashley Du Preez
- Date of birth: 16 July 1997 (age 29)
- Place of birth: Stellenbosch, South Africa
- Height: 5 ft 6 in (1.67 m)
- Position: Forward

Team information
- Current team: Stellenbosch
- Number: 10

Senior career*
Years	Team	Apps	(Gls)
2016–2022	Stellenbosch	88	(15)
2022–2026	Kaizer Chiefs	74	(13)
2026	Stellenbosch	1	(1)

International career
2022–	South Africa	2	(0)
- * Club domestic league appearances and goals as of 4 January 2026

Ashley Du Preez (born 16 July 1997) is a South African professional soccer player who plays as a forward for South African Premiership club Stellenbosch F.C..

He is the cousin of fellow footballer Deano van Rooyen. He grew up with van Rooyen in the Idas Valley area of Stellenbosch.
