= 2018–19 South African Premiership =

Premiership
- Dates: 4 August 2018 – 11 May 2019
- Champions: Mamelodi Sundowns (9th title)
- Relegated: Free State Stars
- Champions League: Mamelodi Sundowns; Orlando Pirates
- Confederation Cup: Bidvest Wits; TS Galaxy
- Matches: 240
- Goals: 542 (2.26 per match)
- Top goalscorer: Mwape Musonda (16 goals)
- Biggest home win: Cape Town City F.C. 5–0 Free State Stars (16 January 2019)
- Biggest away win: Cape Town City F.C. 1–4 Kaizer Chiefs (15 September 2018)
- Highest scoring: AmaZulu 3–3 Mamelodi Sundowns (16 September 2018); Orlando Pirates 4–2 Chippa United (8 January 2019); Polokwane City 3–3 Bidvest Wits (20 January 2019); Bloemfontein Celtic 2–4 Bidvest Wits (15 March 2019)
- Longest winning run: Mamelodi Sundowns (5 games)
- Longest unbeaten run: Mamelodi Sundowns (15 games)
- Longest winless run: Baroka (9 games)
- Longest losing run: Black Leopards (3 games)
- All statistics correct as of 11 May 2019.

The 2018–19 South African Premiership season (known as the ABSA Premiership for sponsorship reasons) was the 23rd season of the Premiership since its establishment in 1996. The season began in August 2018 and concluded in May 2019, with Mamelodi Sundowns winning their second consecutive title.

== Team changes ==
The following teams changed division since the 2017–18 season.

=== To National First Division ===
Relegated from 2017-18 South African Premier Division

- Platinum Stars
- Ajax Cape Town

=== From National First Division ===
Promoted to 2018–19 South African Premiership

- Highlands Park
- Black Leopards

== Teams ==
=== Stadium and Locations ===
Location of teams in the 2018–19 PSL.

| Team | Location | Stadium | Capacity |
|---|---|---|---|
| AmaZulu | Durban (Durban North) | King Goodwill Zwelithini Stadium | 10,000 |
| Polokwane City | Polokwane | Peter Mokaba Stadium | 45,500 |
| Black Leopards | Thohoyandou | Thohoyandou Stadium | 40,000 |
| Mamelodi Sundowns | Pretoria (Marabastad) | Loftus Versfeld Stadium | 51,762 |
| Maritzburg United | Pietermaritzburg | Harry Gwala Stadium | 12,000 |
| SuperSport United | Pretoria | Lucas Masterpieces Moripe Stadium | 28,900 |
| Chippa United | Port Elizabeth | Nelson Mandela Bay Stadium | 48,459 |
| Golden Arrows | Durban(Lamontville) | Princess Magogo Stadium | 12,000 |
| Baroka | Polokwane | Peter Mokaba Stadium | 45,500 |
| Bidvest Wits | Johannesburg (Braamfontein) | Bidvest Stadium | 5,000 |
| Highlands Park | Johannesburg | Balfour Park Stadium | 13,500 |
| Cape Town City | Cape Town (Green Point) | Cape Town Stadium | 55,000 |
| Bloemfontein Celtic | Bloemfontein | Dr. Petrus Molemela Stadium | 22,000 |
| Kaizer Chiefs | Johannesburg (Soweto) | FNB Stadium | 94,736 |
| Free State Stars | Bethlehem | Goble Park | 20,000 |
| Orlando Pirates | Johannesburg (Soweto) | Orlando Stadium | 37,139 |

=== Number of teams by province ===
| | Province | Number of teams | Teams |
|---|---|---|---|
| 1 | Gauteng | 6 | Orlando Pirates, Kaizer Chiefs, Mamelodi Sundowns, SuperSport United, Bidvest Wits and Highlands Park |
| 2 | KwaZulu-Natal | 3 | Maritzburg United, Golden Arrows and Amazulu |
| 2 | Limpopo | 3 | Polokwane City, Baroka FC and Black Leopards |
| 4 | Free State | 2 | Free State Stars and Bloemfontein Celtic |
| 5 | Eastern Cape | 1 | Chippa United |
| 5 | Western Cape | 1 | Cape Town City |

=== Personnel and kits ===
| Team | Manager | Captain | Kit manufacturer | Shirt sponsor (chest) |
|---|---|---|---|---|
| AmaZulu | (South Africa) Cavin Johnson | (South Africa) Nhlanhla Vilakazi | Umbro | SPAR |
| Baroka | (Zambia) Wedson Nyirenda | (South Africa) Mduduzi Mdantsane | Flair | Two Mountains |
| Bidvest Wits | (South Africa) Gavin Hunt | (South Africa) Thulani Hlatshwayo | Kappa | Bidvest |
| Black Leopards | (England) Dylan Kerr | (Democratic Republic of the Congo) Jean Munganga | Umbro | N/A |
| Bloemfontein Celtic | (Malawi) John Maduka | (Cameroon) Patrick Tignyemb | Kappa | N/A |
| Cape Town City | (South Africa) Benni McCarthy | (South Africa) Thamsanqa Mkhize | Umbro | SportPesa |
| Chippa United | (South Africa) Clinton Larsen | (South Africa) Mark Mayambela | Joma | Nelson Mandela Bay |
| Free State Stars | (Serbia) Nikola Kavazovic | (South Africa) Paulus Masehe | Lotto | N/A |
| Golden Arrows | (South Africa) Steve Komphela | (South Africa) Nkanyiso Mngwengwe | Made by club | N/A |
| Highlands Park | (South Africa) Owen Da Gama | (Zimbabwe) Tapuwa Kapini | Kappa | Jonsson Workwear |
| Kaizer Chiefs | (Germany) Ernst Middendorp | (South Africa) Itumeleng Khune | Nike | Vodacom |
| Mamelodi Sundowns | (South Africa) Pitso Mosimane | (South Africa) Hlompho Kekana | Puma | Ubuntu-Botho S&E |
| Maritzburg United | (South Africa) Eric Tinkler | (South Africa) Siyanda Xulu | Lotto | N/A |
| Orlando Pirates | (Serbia) Milutin Sredojević | (South Africa) Happy Jele | Adidas | Vodacom |
| Polokwane City | (Slovakia) Jozef Vukusic | (South Africa) Jabulani Maluleke | XCo | N/A |
| SuperSports United | (Zimbabwe) Kaitano Tembo | (South Africa) Dean Furman | Kappa | Engen |

== Managerial changes ==
| Team | Outgoing manager | Manner of departure | Date of vacancy | Position in table | Incoming manager | Date of appointment |
|---|---|---|---|---|---|---|
| Baroka | (South Africa) Doctor Khumalo | Mutual consent | 12 May 2018 | Pre-season | (Zambia) Wedson Nyirenda | 30 May 2018 |
| Celtic | (Serbia) Veselin Jelusic | Mutual consent | 14 June 2018 | Pre-season | (South Africa) Steve Komphela | 20 June 2018 |
| Polokwane | (South Africa) Bernard Molekwa | Retained as assistant coach | 27 June 2018 | Pre-season | (Slovakia) Jozef Vukusic | 27 June 2018 |
| Kaizer Chiefs | (South Africa) Steve Komphela | Resigned | 21 April 2018 | Pre-season | (Italy) Giovanni Solinas | 13 July 2018 |

== League table ==
| Pos | Team | Pld | W | D | L | GF | GA | GD | Pts | Qualification or relegation (Note: TS Galaxy (from National First Division) are Nedbank Cup winners and also qualify for Confederation Cup.) |
|---|---|---|---|---|---|---|---|---|---|---|
| 1 | Mamelodi Sundowns (C) | 30 | 16 | 11 | 3 | 40 | 24 | +16 | 59 | Qualification for Champions League |
| 2 | Orlando Pirates | 30 | 15 | 12 | 3 | 44 | 24 | +20 | 57 | Qualification for Champions League |
| 3 | Bidvest Wits | 30 | 16 | 6 | 8 | 45 | 29 | +16 | 54 | Qualification for Confederation Cup |
| 4 | Cape Town City | 30 | 13 | 9 | 8 | 47 | 35 | +12 | 48 | |
| 5 | Polokwane City | 30 | 11 | 11 | 8 | 38 | 35 | +3 | 44 | |
| 6 | SuperSport United | 30 | 12 | 8 | 10 | 29 | 29 | 0 | 44 | |
| 7 | Highlands Park | 30 | 9 | 14 | 7 | 35 | 32 | +3 | 41 | |
| 8 | Bloemfontein Celtic | 30 | 11 | 7 | 12 | 35 | 37 | −2 | 40 | |
| 9 | Kaizer Chiefs | 30 | 9 | 12 | 9 | 33 | 29 | +4 | 39 | |
| 10 | Golden Arrows | 30 | 8 | 12 | 10 | 27 | 31 | −4 | 36 | |
| 11 | AmaZulu FC | 30 | 10 | 7 | 13 | 33 | 41 | −8 | 31 (Note: AmaZulu had 6 points deducted for failing to pay former player Phineas Nambandi.) | |
| 12 | Chippa United | 30 | 7 | 9 | 14 | 27 | 35 | −8 | 30 | |
| 13 | Black Leopards | 30 | 7 | 9 | 14 | 30 | 46 | −16 | 30 | |
| 14 | Baroka FC | 30 | 6 | 11 | 13 | 27 | 37 | −10 | 29 | |
| 15 | Maritzburg United (O) | 30 | 6 | 9 | 15 | 22 | 32 | −10 | 27 | Qualification for Playoff Tournament |
| 16 | Free State Stars (R) | 30 | 6 | 9 | 15 | 31 | 47 | −16 | 27 | Relegation to National First Division |

Source: Premier Soccer League
Rules for classification: 1) Points; 2) Goal difference; 3) Goals scored; 4) Head-to-head points; 5) Head-to-head goal difference; 6) Head-to-head goals scored; 7) Playoff
(C) Champions; (O) Play-off winners; (R) Relegated

== Results ==
| Home \ Away | AMA | BAR | BID | BLA | BFC | CTC | CPU | FSS | LGA | HIG | KAI | MAM | MAR | ORL | POL | SSU |
|---|---|---|---|---|---|---|---|---|---|---|---|---|---|---|---|---|
| AmaZulu FC | — | 1–0 | 2–0 | 1–1 | 3–0 | 1–0 | 0–1 | 2–1 | 2–0 | 0–0 | 2–3 | 3–3 | 0–0 | 1–1 | 0–0 | 2–0 |
| Baroka FC | 1–0 | — | 1–2 | 1–2 | 2–2 | 2–1 | 1–1 | 0–0 | 0–1 | 1–1 | 1–1 | 1–2 | 1–1 | 1–2 | 1–3 | 0–0 |
| Bidvest Wits | 3–0 | 3–1 | — | 3–1 | 1–2 | 2–3 | 2–0 | 3–0 | 2–2 | 1–0 | 0–2 | 1–1 | 1–0 | 0–1 | 0–1 | 0–1 |
| Black Leopards | 3–1 | 1–0 | 0–1 | — | 0–1 | 1–0 | 3–2 | 1–1 | 1–1 | 0–0 | 1–1 | 1–2 | 0–1 | 1–2 | 1–0 | 2–0 |
| Bloemfontein Celtic | 3–1 | 1–0 | 2–4 | 3–0 | — | 0–3 | 2–0 | 2–3 | 1–1 | 1–2 | 1–0 | 0–0 | 0–1 | 1–0 | 1–2 | 0–0 |
| Cape Town City | 3–0 | 2–2 | 0–2 | 3–1 | 3–2 | — | 1–1 | 5–0 | 0–0 | 1–1 | 1–4 | 2–1 | 3–2 | 2–2 | 0–0 | 2–0 |
| Chippa United | 0–1 | 1–0 | 0–1 | 2–2 | 0–1 | 0–2 | — | 1–0 | 1–1 | 1–1 | 1–0 | 0–1 | 2–0 | 0–1 | 2–2 | 0–1 |
| Free State Stars | 4–1 | 2–2 | 1–2 | 2–2 | 2–0 | 2–2 | 0–2 | — | 1–1 | 1–0 | 0–2 | 0–1 | 2–1 | 1–3 | 1–1 | 0–1 |
| Golden Arrows | 1–1 | 1–2 | 0–1 | 1–0 | 0–2 | 1–0 | 0–0 | 2–1 | — | 2–1 | 2–1 | 0–1 | 2–0 | 0–1 | 1–1 | 2–3 |
| Highlands Park | 1–2 | 2–1 | 2–1 | 2–2 | 1–0 | 2–0 | 2–1 | 1–1 | 2–1 | — | 0–0 | 1–2 | 1–0 | 2–2 | 2–0 | 1–1 |
| Kaizer Chiefs | 2–0 | 0–1 | 1–3 | 1–0 | 2–2 | 0–1 | 0–0 | 1–1 | 1–1 | 3–2 | — | 1–2 | 1–0 | 1–1 | 0–1 | 1–0 |
| Mamelodi Sundowns | 0–2 | 0–0 | 1–1 | 3–0 | 0–0 | 3–2 | 3–2 | 3–1 | 2–0 | 0–0 | 1–1 | — | 1–0 | 0–0 | 1–1 | 0–2 |
| Maritzburg United | 2–1 | 0–1 | 0–0 | 1–1 | 2–1 | 0–0 | 0–0 | 1–2 | 0–2 | 2–2 | 0–0 | 1–2 | — | 0–1 | 3–1 | 3–1 |
| Orlando Pirates | 4–1 | 1–1 | 0–1 | 2–0 | 1–1 | 2–2 | 4–2 | 2–1 | 0–0 | 1–1 | 2–1 | 0–0 | 0–0 | — | 3–0 | 3–1 |
| Polokwane City | 3–2 | 2–0 | 3–3 | 3–1 | 1–2 | 1–2 | 1–3 | 1–0 | 2–0 | 2–2 | 1–1 | 0–2 | 1–0 | 1–2 | — | 1–1 |
| SuperSport United | 1–0 | 1–2 | 1–1 | 4–0 | 2–1 | 0–1 | 2–1 | 1–0 | 1–1 | 0–2 | 1–1 | 1–2 | 1–0 | 1–0 | 0–0 | — |

Updated to match(es) played on 17 Mar 2019. Source: PSL
Legend: Blue = home team win; Yellow = draw; Red = away team win.
For upcoming matches, an "a" indicates there is an article about the rivalry between the two participants.

== Statistics ==
=== Top scorers ===
As of 11 May 2019

| Rank | Player | Club | Goals |
|---|---|---|---|
| 1 | (Zambia) Mwape Musonda | Black Leopards | 16 |
| 2 | (South Africa) Gift Motupa | Bidvest Wits | 9 |
| 2 | (South Africa) Thembinkosi Lorch | Orlando Pirates | 9 |
| 2 | (South Africa) Tshegofatso Mabasa | Bloemfontein Celtic | 9 |
| 5 | (Zimbabwe) Knox Mutizwa | Golden Arrows | 8 |
| 5 | (South Africa) Lebohang Maboe | Mamelodi Sundowns | 8 |
| 5 | (South Africa) Mothobi Mvala | Highlands Park | 8 |
| 5 | (Ghana) Mohammed Anas | Polokwane City | 8 |
| 5 | (South Africa) Vincent Pule | Orlando Pirates | 8 |
| 10 | (South Africa) Mxolisi Macuphu | SuperSport United | 7 |
| 10 | (South Africa) Siphelele Mthembu | Cape Town City | 7 |
| 10 | (South Africa) Bongi Ntuli | AmaZulu | 7 |
| 10 | (Namibia) Peter Shalulile | Chippa United | 7 |

=== Assists ===
| Rank | Player | Club | Assists |
|---|---|---|---|
| 1 | (Namibia) Deon Hotto | Bidvest Wits | 13 |
| 2 | (South Africa) Aubrey Modiba | SuperSport United | 10 |
| 3 | (South Africa) Jabulani Maluleke | Polokwane City | 9 |
| 4 | (South Africa) Fortune Makaringe | Maritzburg United | 8 |
| 4 | (Zambia) Augustine Mulenga | Orlando Pirates | 8 |
| 4 | (Uruguay) Gaston Sirino | Mamelodi Sundowns | 8 |
| 7 | (South Africa) Thembinkosi Lorch | Orlando Pirates | 7 |
| 8 | (South Africa) Ndumiso Mabena | Bloemfontein Celtic | 6 |
| 8 | (South Africa) Mduduzi Mdantsane | Baroka | 6 |
| 8 | (South Africa) Themba Zwane | Mamelodi Sundowns | 6 |

=== Clean Sheets ===
| Rank | Player | Club | Clean Sheets |
|---|---|---|---|
| 1 | (Cameroon) Patrick Tignyemb | Bloemfontein Celtic | 11 |
| 1 | (South Africa) Ronwen Williams | SuperSport United | 10 |
| 3 | (South Africa) Darren Keet | Bidvest Wits | 9 |
| 3 | (South Africa) Siyabonga Mbatha | AmaZulu F.C. | 9 |
| 5 | (Ghana) Richard Ofori | Maritzburg United | 7 |
| 5 | (Netherlands) Peter Leeuwenburgh | Cape Town City | 7 |
| 7 | (South Africa) Nkosingiphile Gumede | Golden Arrows | 6 |
| 7 | (South Africa) Itumeleng Khune | Kaizer Chiefs | 6 |
| 7 | (Nigeria) Daniel Akpeyi | Kaizer Chiefs | 6 |
| 7 | (Zimbabwe) George Chigova | Polokwane City | 6 |

=== Hat-tricks ===
| Player | Club | Score | Opponent | Venue | Date |
|---|---|---|---|---|---|
| (Zambia) Mwape Musonda | Black Leopards | 3–2 | Chippa United | Thohoyandou Stadium, Thohoyandou | 10 March 2019 |

=== Discipline ===
As of 17 March 2019

==== Player ====
- Most yellow cards: 10
  - (Zimbabwe) Danny Phiri (Golden Arrows)
- Most red cards: 2
  - (South Africa) Nyiko Mobbie (Free State Stars)
  - (South Africa) Robyn Johannes (Bidvest Wits)
  - (South Africa) Taariq Fielies (Cape Town City)
  - (South Africa) Khuliso Mudau (Black Leopards)

==== Team ====
- Most yellow cards: 50
  - Bidvest Wits
- Most red cards: 4
  - Free State Stars
- Fewest yellow cards: 25
  - Black Leopards
- Fewest red cards: 0
  - Kaizer Chiefs
  - SuperSport United
  - AmaZulu
  - Chippa United

== Attendances ==
| # | Football club | Average attendance |
|---|---|---|
| 1 | Orlando Pirates | 16,067 |
| 2 | Kaizer Chiefs | 14,873 |
| 3 | Black Leopards FC | 11,049 |
| 4 | Bloemfontein Celtic | 9,977 |
| 5 | Mamelodi Sundowns | 8,427 |
| 6 | Cape Town City | 8,307 |
| 7 | Maritzburg United | 7,380 |
| 8 | Chippa United | 7,067 |
| 9 | AmaZulu FC | 5,767 |
| 10 | Polokwane City FC | 5,554 |
| 11 | SuperSport United | 5,219 |
| 12 | Highlands Park | 5,020 |
| 13 | Baroka | 4,595 |
| 14 | Free State Stars | 2,570 |
| 15 | Golden Arrows | 2,473 |
| 16 | Bidvest Wits | 2,437 |
