= 2011–12 South African Premiership =

Premier Soccer League
- Season: 2011–12
- Champions: Orlando Pirates; 4th Premiership title
- Champions League: Orlando Pirates
- Confederation Cup: Supersport United (via domestic cup)
- Matches: 240
- Goals: 582 (2.43 per match)
- Top goalscorer: Siyabonga Nomvethe (20 goals)
- Biggest home win: SuperSport United 7–0 Maritzburg United (14 October 2011)
- Biggest away win: Black Leopards 2–5 Moroka Swallows (4 May 2012); Black Leopards 1–4 Amazulu (22 April 2012); Ajax Cape Town 0–3 Mamelodi Sundowns (17 March 2012); Santos 2–5 Mamelodi Sundowns (30 November 2011); Golden Arrows 0–3 Bloemfontein Celtic (13 August 2011)
- Highest scoring: Black Leopards 2–5 Moroka Swallows (4 May 2012); Platinum Stars 3–4 Orlando Pirates (22 February 2012); Ajax Cape Town 4–3 Black Leopards (21 December 2011); Santos 2–5 Mamelodi Sundowns (30 November 2011) SuperSport United 7–0 Maritzburg United (14 October 2011)
- Longest winning run: 3 wins Kaizer Chiefs; Mamelodi Sundowns; SuperSport United
- Longest unbeaten run: 4 games Mamelodi Sundowns; SuperSport United; Maritzburg United
- Longest losing run: 4 games Santos
- Average attendance: 7,120

The 2011–12 South African Premiership, known as the ABSA Premiership for sponsorship purposes, and also commonly referred to as the PSL after the governing body, was the sixteenth season of the Premiership since its establishment in 1996.

Orlando Pirates were the defending champions, having won their third Premiership title, and in the process ended SuperSport United's 3 year grip on the championship. The season kicked off on 12 August 2011 and ended on 19 May 2012.

16 teams contested the season, including two newly promoted teams – yo-yo club Jomo Cosmos – who were promoted for the second time in 3 seasons after winning the 2010–11 National First Division champions' playoff 5–4 on penalties against Bay United, and Black Leopards who came through a four-way promotion playoff, defeating Bay United 2–0 over a two-legged final. Orlando Pirates secured the title with a 4–2 win against Golden Arrows on 19 May 2012. This was their fourth PSL title overall and the second in succession. At the bottom, Jomo Cosmos was automatically relegated to the First Division while Santos was relegated via the PSL Playoff Tournament.

== TV rights ==
The PSL announced that current digital broadcaster SuperSport had won the rights to continue broadcasting the PSL after their current contract expired at the end of the 2011–12 season. The new broadcasting deal will commence at the start of the 2012–13 season and is said to be worth R2 billion over five years. As with their outgoing contract, SuperSport will continue to lease a select number of matches to free-to-air public broadcaster SABC.

== Teams ==
The team finishing 16th and last during the 2010–11 season – Mpumalanga Black Aces – was automatically relegated from the Premiership while the team finishing 15th – Vasco da Gama – was entered into a four-way relegation/promotion playoff with 3 teams from the 2010–11 National First Division season, where they were comfortably beaten 4–2 on aggregate by Black Leopards in the semi-finals and thus relegated from the Premiership. As it was, both Black Aces and Vasco had been promoted in the previous season, so they each spent a single season in the top flight before going straight back down.

Jomo Cosmos and Black Leopards had finished first and second in the Inland Stream of the 2010–11 National First Division season. Cosmos, as champions of the Inland Stream, faced off against the champions of the Coastal Stream – Bay United – and beat them 5–4 on penalties after two goalless draws, thus securing promotion to the PSL. In the next phase of the relegation/promotion playoffs Black Leopards had taken on and defeated Vasco da Gama of the PSL over two legs and proceeded to reach the final of the playoffs, where they met Bay United. Leopards continued Bay United's heartbreaking end to their season by defeating them over two legs to earn a return to the PSL after two seasons out of the top flight.

=== Stadiums and locations ===
Football teams in South Africa tend to use multiple stadiums over the course of a season for their home games. The following table will only indicate the stadium used most often by the club for their home games

Team	Location of training field	Province	Home venue	Capacity
Ajax Cape Town	Cape Town (Parow)	Western Cape	Cape Town Stadium	55,000
AmaZulu	Durban (Durban North)	Kwazulu-Natal	Moses Mabhida Stadium	54,000
Bidvest Wits	Johannesburg (Braamfontein)	Gauteng	Bidvest Stadium	5,000
Black Leopards	Polokwane	Limpopo	Peter Mokaba Stadium	45,000
Bloemfontein Celtic	Bloemfontein	Free State	Seisa Ramabodu Stadium	20,000
Free State Stars	Phuthaditjhaba	Free State	Charles Mopeli Stadium	35,000
Golden Arrows	Umlazi	Kwazulu-Natal	King Zwelithini Stadium	10,000
Jomo Cosmos	Johannesburg	Gauteng	Makhulong Stadium	15,000
Kaizer Chiefs	Johannesburg (Soweto)	Gauteng	FNB Stadium (Soccer City)	94,700
Mamelodi Sundowns	Pretoria (Arcadia)	Gauteng	Loftus Versfeld Stadium	52,000
Maritzburg United	Pietermaritzburg	Kwazulu-Natal	Harry Gwala Stadium	10,700
Moroka Swallows	Johannesburg (Soweto)	Gauteng	Dobsonville Stadium	24,000
Orlando Pirates	Johannesburg (Soweto)	Gauteng	Orlando Stadium	36,400
Platinum Stars	Rustenburg (Phokeng)	North West	Royal Bafokeng Stadium	45,000
Santos	Cape Town (Lansdowne)	Western Cape	Athlone Stadium	25,000
Supersport United	Pretoria (Atteridgeville)	Gauteng	Lucas Moripe Stadium	28,900

Location of teams in the 2011–12 PSL.

=== Personnel and kits ===
Team	Manager	Supplier	Shirt sponsor
Ajax Cape Town	(Netherlands) Maarten Stekelenburg	Adidas	MTN
AmaZulu	(Sweden) Roger Palmgren	Adidas	SPAR
Bidvest Wits	(South Africa) Roger De Sa	Nike	Bidvest
Black Leopards	(Zimbabwe) Sunday Chidzambwa	Umbro	MTN
Bloemfontein Celtic	(South Africa) Clinton Larsen	Reebok	MTN
Free State Stars	(South Africa) Steve Komphela	Umbro	Bonitas
Golden Arrows	(Germany) Ernst Middendorp	Millé	MTN
Jomo Cosmos	(South Africa) Jomo Sono	Puma	
Kaizer Chiefs	(Serbia) Vladimir Vermezović	Nike	Vodacom
Mamelodi Sundowns	(Netherlands) Johan Neeskens	Nike	Ubuntu Botho
Maritzburg United	(South Africa) Ian Palmer	Hummel	
Moroka Swallows	(South Africa) Gordon Igesund	Puma	VW
Orlando Pirates	(Brazil) Júlio César Leal	Adidas	Vodacom
Platinum Stars	(South Africa) Owen Da Gama	Puma	Royal Bafokeng
Santos	(South Africa) Boebie Solomons	Winner	Engen
Supersport United	(South Africa) Gavin Hunt	Under Armour	DStv

=== Managerial changes ===
Team	Outgoing manager	Manner of departure	Date of vacancy	Position in table	Incoming manager	Date of appointment
Ajax CT	(Netherlands) Foppe de Haan	Retirement	21 May 2011	End of season	(Netherlands) Maarten Stekelenburg	21 June 2011
Orlando Pirates	(Netherlands) Ruud Krol	End of contract	June 2011	End of season	(Brazil) Júlio César Leal	22 June 2011
Amazulu	(South Africa) Manqoba Mngqithi	Sacked	18 September 2011	15th	(Sweden) Roger Palmgren	18 September 2011
Black Leopards	(Zimbabwe) Sunday Chidzambwa	Redeployed	26 October 2011		(Serbia) Vladislav Heric	26 October 2011
Santos	(South Africa) Boebie Solomons	Redeployed	8 December 2011	14th	(South Africa) Duncan Crowie	8 December 2011
Platinum Stars	(South Africa) Owen Da Gama	Suspended	9 March 2012	13th	(South Africa) Cavin Johnson & (South Africa) Allan Freese	9 March 2012
Orlando Pirates	(Brazil) Júlio César Leal	Sacked	12 March 2012		(Peru) Augusto Palacios	12 March 2012
Kaizer Chiefs	(Serbia) Vladimir Vermezovic	Sacked	12 April 2012		(South Africa) Ace Khuse	12 March 2012
Santos	(South Africa) Duncan Crowie	Caretaker period ended	19 April 2012	15th	(Netherlands) Mart Nooij	19 April 2012
Black Leopards	(Serbia) Vladislav Heric	Redeployed	8 May 2012	14th	(Zimbabwe) Sunday Chidzambwa	8 May 2012

== League table ==
Pos	Team	Pld	W	D	L	GF	GA	GD	Pts	Qualification or relegation
1	Orlando Pirates (C)	30	17	7	6	39	26	+13	58	Qualification for 2013 CAF Champions League
2	Moroka Swallows	30	15	11	4	48	34	+14	56	
3	SuperSport United	30	15	9	6	39	23	+16	54	Qualification for 2013 CAF Confederation Cup
4	Mamelodi Sundowns	30	14	10	6	44	23	+21	52	
5	Kaizer Chiefs	30	14	8	8	35	23	+12	50	
6	Free State Stars	30	14	6	10	38	31	+7	48	
7	AmaZulu	30	10	11	9	32	24	+8	41	
8	Bloemfontein Celtic	30	11	8	11	36	33	+3	41	
9	Ajax Cape Town	30	11	7	12	42	49	−7	40	
10	Platinum Stars	30	10	6	14	37	39	−2	36	
11	Maritzburg United	30	7	13	10	26	38	−12	34	
12	Bidvest Wits	30	7	12	11	31	38	−7	33	
13	Golden Arrows	30	9	5	16	40	48	−8	32	
14	Black Leopards	30	7	8	15	36	58	−22	29	
15	Santos (R)	30	7	6	17	34	48	−14	27	PSL Playoff Tournament
16	Jomo Cosmos (R)	30	2	13	15	24	46	−22	19	Relegation to National First Division

Updated to match(es) played on 19 May 2012. Source: Standings
Rules for classification: 1) points; 2) goal difference; 3) number of goals scored.
(C) Champions; (R) Relegated
- Winner of the 2012 Nedbank Cup will qualify for the 2013 CAF Confederation Cup.

== Results ==
Home \ Away	AJX	AMZ	BVW	BLP	BLC	FSS	GOL	JC	KZC	MLS	MAR	MOR	ORL	PLA	SAN	SUP
Ajax Cape Town		2–4	0–2	4–3	2–0	3–1	4–1	1–1	2–1	0–3	1–1	2–2	1–1	3–2	1–1	0–0
AmaZulu	4–0		2–0	0–1	2–0	0–1	1–0	0–0	0–0	0–1	0–0	0–1	0–1	1–2	2–2	1–2
Bidvest Wits	1–1	3–1		0–0	1–3	1–3	2–2	0–1	1–1	2–3	0–0	1–3	3–1	2–1	1–0	0–1
Black Leopards	3–1	1–4	1–2		2–2	1–3	2–0	1–1	0–2	1–2	0–0	2–5	0–2	2–3	2–1	1–0
Bloemfontein Celtic	4–2	1–1	0–0	2–0		1–0	3–2	3–1	0–0	0–0	1–1	1–1	1–0	0–1	2–0	1–2
Free State Stars	1–0	2–1	0–0	2–2	2–1		3–1	1–0	1–2	0–2	4–1	0–1	1–0	0–0	2–0	1–1
Golden Arrows	0–1	1–2	1–1	4–2	0–3	2–0		3–1	0–0	1–1	4–1	2–0	2–4	3–1	1–3	1–2
Jomo Cosmos	1–2	0–0	0–0	2–2	1–2	2–2	0–2		1–1	0–2	1–1	0–2	1–2	2–1	2–2	2–2
Kaizer Chiefs	2–0	0–0	2–1	0–1	2–0	2–1	1–2	2–1		2–0	0–1	3–0	2–1	1–0	0–0	1–2
Mamelodi Sundowns	2–3	0–0	1–1	5–1	2–1	1–0	0–0	0–0	0–1		1–0	4–0	0–0	1–2	3–1	0–1
Maritzburg United	0–2	1–1	2–2	0–1	2–0	0–2	2–0	3–1	0–0	1–0		0–1	2–1	2–1	1–1	0–0
Moroka Swallows	3–2	1–1	3–0	4–1	0–0	2–1	3–2	2–0	0–2	2–2	2–2		0–0	2–1	3–2	1–1
Orlando Pirates	1–0	0–0	0–0	1–0	2–1	3–1	2–0	2–1	3–2	0–0	1–0	1–1		1–0	1–0	3–0
Platinum Stars	2–0	0–1	0–2	2–2	2–1	0–1	1–0	4–1	1–2	0–0	1–1	0–0	3–4		4–1	0–0
Santos	0–1	1–2	3–1	1–1	2–1	0–1	1–2	1–0	2–1	2–5	2–1	1–3	3–0	1–2		0–1
SuperSport United	2–1	0–1	2–1	3–0	0–1	1–1	2–1	0–0	2–0	1–3	7–0	0–0	1–2	2–0	1–0	

Updated to match(es) played on 19 May 2012. Source: Premier Soccer League
Legend: Blue = home team win; Yellow = draw; Red = away team win.

== Statistics ==
Top goalscorers As of May 19, 2012

Rank	Player	Club	Goals
1	(South Africa) Siyabonga Nomvethe	Moroka Swallows	20
2	(South Africa) Eleazar Rodgers	Santos	13
3	(South Africa) Edward Manqele	Free State Stars	11
4	(South Africa) Lehlohonolo Majoro	Kaizer Chiefs	10
4	(South Africa) David Mathebula	Moroka Swallows	10
4	(South Africa) Benni McCarthy	Orlando Pirates	10
4	(South Africa) Katlego Mphela	Mamelodi Sundowns	10
8	(South Africa) Luyanda Bacela	Bloemfontein Celtic	9
8	(Zimbabwe) Nyasha Mushekwi	Mamelodi Sundowns	9
10	(Zimbabwe) Khama Billiat	Ajax Cape Town	8
10	(South Africa) Thamsanqa Gabuza	Golden Arrows	8
10	(Zimbabwe) Kingston Nkhatha	Black Leopards	8

Last updated: 19 May 2012
Source: Premier Soccer League

== Awards ==
The 2011–12 PSL Awards ceremony was held on 27 May 2012.

=== PSL Footballer of the Year ===
The PSL Footballer of the Year was awarded to Siyabonga Nomvethe.

Palesa Shabalala The PSL Player of the Season was also awarded to Siyabonga Nomvethe.

=== PSL Players' Player of the Season ===
The PSL Players' Player of the Season was also awarded to Siyabonga Nomvethe.

=== PSL Red Hot Young Player of the Season ===
The PSL Red Hot Young Player of the Season was awarded to Ronwen Williams.

=== PSL Coach of the Season ===
The PSL Coach of the Season was awarded to Gordon Igesund.

=== PSL Top Goalscorer ===
The PSL Top Goalscorer award went to Siyabonga Nomvethe.

=== PSL Goalkeeper of the Season ===
The PSL Goalkeeper of the Season award went to Wayne Sandilands.

=== PSL Absa-lutely Awesome Goal of the Season ===
The PSL Absa-lutely Awesome Goal of the Season award went to Benni McCarthy.

== Attendances ==
The Soweto Derby on 17 March 2012 attracted the highest crowd with 87,171. Source:

No.	Club	Average
1	Orlando Pirates	16,482
2	Kaizer Chiefs	13,508
3	Mamelodi Sundowns	10,871
4	Black Leopards	9,939
5	Maritzburg United	7,274
6	Lamontville Golden Arrows	7,210
7	Bloemfontein Celtic	6,926
8	AmaZulu	6,789
9	Bidvest Wits	6,615
10	Engen Santos	5,659
11	Ajax Cape Town	5,580
12	SuperSport United	4,383
13	Free State Stars	3,707
14	Moroka Swallows	3,604
15	Jomo Cosmos	3,037
16	Platinum Stars	2,416

== See also ==
- CAF 5-year ranking
