= Rhulani Mokwena =

South African football manager (born 1987)

Rulani Mlungisi Mokwena
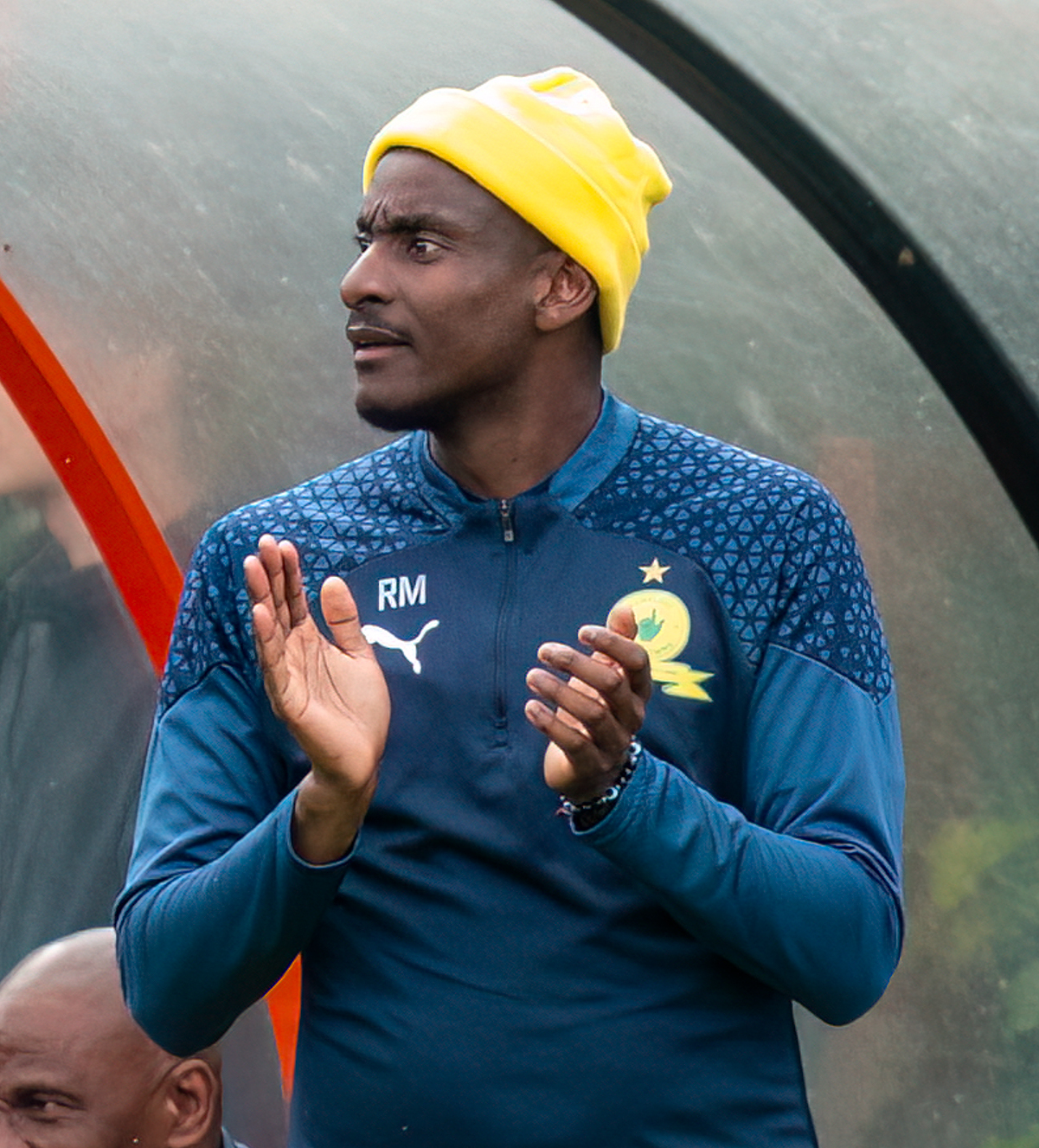
- Mokwena in 2023

Personal information
- Full name: Rulani Mlungisi Mokwena
- Date of birth: 9 January 1987 (age 39)
- Place of birth: Johannesburg, South Africa

Team information
- Current team: Pyramids FC (head coach)

Youth career
- Years: Team
- Silver Stars

Managerial career
- 2014–2017: Mamelodi Sundowns (assistant)
- 2017–2020: Orlando Pirates (assistant)
- 2019: Orlando Pirates (interim)
- 2020: Chippa United (interim)
- 2020–2022: Mamelodi Sundowns (co-coach)
- 2022–2024: Mamelodi Sundowns
- 2024–2025: Wydad AC
- 2025–2026: MC Alger
- 2026: Al Ittihad
- 2026–: Pyramids FC

Rulani Mlungisi Mokwena (born 9 January 1987) is a South African football manager who is the current manager of Egyptian Premier League side Pyramids FC.

The son of former Orlando Pirates player Julias Sono Hloae, and nephew to Jomo Sono, Mokwena hails from a footballing family and started his professional coaching career in the youth systems at Silver Stars, before serving as an assistant manager at Mamelodi Sundowns and Pirates. In 2019, he became interim manager of the latter club, holding the position for five months, before being appointed as the head coach at Chippa United the following year.

== Early career ==
Mokwena's first notable foray into football came at Silver Stars, later known as Platinum Stars, where he honed his skills under coaches such as Steve Komphela, Cavin Johnson and Allan Freese. In 2014, he joined Mamelodi Sundowns where, after excelling with the club's development team, he was promoted to be one of manager Pitso Mosimane's assistant managers, alongside Manqoba Mngqithi and Alex Bapela. Mokwena stayed with Masandawana until 2017, helping the club win the 2016 CAF Champions League title, before taking up a role as the assistant manager to Milutin Sredojević at Orlando Pirates.

== Managerial career ==
=== Orlando Pirates ===
In August 2019, after Sredojević unexpectedly resigned at Pirates, Mokwena was named as the new interim-manager of the club and he marked his managerial debut with a 1-0 MTN 8 defeat to Highlands Park. Over the next five months, he took charge of 15 matches, winning five, drawing five and losing five, before returning to the assistant manager's role following the appointment of Josef Zinnbauer in December.

=== Chippa United ===
On 4 March 2020, Mokwena left Zinnbauer's side after being appointed as the head coach of fellow Premier Division side Chippa United on a short-term deal. However, his time with the club was disrupted by the COVID-19 outbreak, which saw the league suspended later that month, and by the end of his contract in June he had overseen just one match in charge for the season.

=== Mamelodi Sundowns ===
In 2020, Mokwena became co-coach of Mamelodi Sundowns alongside Manqoba Mngqithi. In October 2022, "Mngqithi was assigned to a new role as Sundowns' senior coach in what is a demotion from the position of co-coach. He will now be working under new head coach Rulani Mokwena", Goal.com reported. He won the South African Premiership Coach of the Month in February, March, and August 2023. He won the coach of the season award for the 2023/24 season. On 3 July 2024, it was confirmed that he and Mamelodi Sundowns have parted ways, citing taking into account the objectives and expectations of the board

He was named the coach of the year at the inaugural COSAFA awards.

=== Wydad AC ===
On 11 July 2024, Mokwena joined Botola side Wydad AC as head coach, by signing a contract until 2027. On 29 April 2025, the club dismissed Mokwena with a few matches of the season remaining. The club announced the termination of his contract by mutual consent on 20 May.

=== MC Alger ===
He joined Algerian Ligue Professionnelle 1 side MC Alger in July 2025. He won his first trophy with the club in the 2025 Algerian Super Cup. On 14 March 2026, he left the club.

=== Al Ittihad ===
Mokwena joined Libyan club Al Ittihad in March 2026.

=== Pyramids FC ===
On 17 July 2026, Mokwena was appointed as head coach of the Egyptian Premier League side Pyramids FC.

== Managerial statistics ==
As of 25 May 2026

Managerial record by team and tenure
Team	Nat.	From	To	Record								Ref
Team	Nat.	From	To	G	W	D	L	GF	GA	GD	Win %	Ref
Orlando Pirates (interim)	(South Africa)	17 August 2019	10 December 2019	14	4	5	5	21	23	−2	28.57	
Chippa United (interim)	(South Africa)	4 March 2020	30 June 2020	2	1	1	0	2	1	+1	50.00	
Mamelodi Sundowns	(South Africa)	4 October 2020	4 July 2024	195	122	55	18	341	113	+228	62.56	
Wydad AC	(Morocco)	10 July 2024	29 April 2025	38	16	14	8	55	32	+23	42.11	
MC Alger	(Algeria)	21 July 2025	14 March 2026	34	20	8	6	41	19	+22	58.82	
Al-Ittihad	(Libya)	17 March 2026	16 July 2026	9	5	3	1	14	6	+8	55.56	
Pyramids FC	(Egypt)	17 July 2026	present	12	12	0	0	29	4	+25	100.00	
Career total				296	172	86	38	482	193	+289	58.11	—

== Honours ==
Mamelodi Sundowns

- South African Premiership: 2021–22, 2022–23, 2023–24
- African Football League: 2023

MC Alger

- Algerian Super Cup: 2025

Individual

- COSAFA Awards Coach of the Year: 2023
- South African Premiership Coach of the Season: 2022/23, 2023/24 , 2024/25
- South African Premiership Coach of the Month: February 2023, March 2023, August 2023 , April 2024
