= 2013–14 South African Premiership =

Premiership
- Season: 2013–14
- Champions: Mamelodi Sundowns
- Relegated: Golden Arrows
- Champions League: Mamelodi Sundowns
- Confederation Cup: Bidvest Wits
- Goals: 531(2.18 per match)
- Top goalscorer: Bernard Parker (10 goals)
- Biggest home win: Sundowns 7-1 AmaZulu (22 October 2013)
- Biggest away win: Platinum stars 1- 4 Golden Arrows ( 19 April 2014)
- Highest scoring: Black Aces 5-2 Moroka Swallows (15 March 2014)
- Average attendance: 5,073

The 2013–14 South African Premiership season (known as the ABSA Premiership for sponsorship reasons, and also commonly referred to as the PSL after the governing body) was the eighteenth season of the Premiership since its establishment in 1996. The draw for the fixtures was held on 20 June 2013. The season was scheduled to begin on 2 August 2013 and end on 10 May 2014.

Kaizer Chiefs were the defending champions, having won the previous 2012–13 Premier Soccer League (PSL) season. The season featured 14 teams from the 2012-13 season and two new teams promoted from the 2012–13 National First Division: Polokwane City and Mpumalanga Black Aces who replace relegated Black Leopards and Chippa United.

== Average attendance ==
Football club	Average attendance	Home games
Kaizer Chiefs	18,470	15
Orlando Pirates	12,476	15
Mamelodi Sundowns	11,533	15
Bloemfontein Celtic	8,146	15
Ajax Cape Town	8,110	15
Polokwane City	6,743	15
Maritzburg United	6,223	15
Mpumalanga Black Aces	4,852	15
AmaZulu	4,783	15
Golden Arrows	4,766	15
Pretoria University	4,583	15
Platinum Stars	3,616	15
Bidvest Wits	3,333	15
SuperSport United	3,069	15
Free State Stars	2,520	15
Moroka Swallows	2,220	15

== Teams ==
A total of 16 teams contested the league, including 14 sides from the 2012–13 season and two promoted from the 2012–13 National First Division.

=== Stadiums and locations ===
Football teams in South Africa tend to use multiple stadiums over the course of a season for their home games. The following table will only indicate the stadium used most often by the club for their home games

Team	Location of training field	Province	Home venue	Capacity
Ajax Cape Town	Cape Town (Parow)	Western Cape	Cape Town Stadium	55,000
AmaZulu	Durban (Durban North)	Kwazulu-Natal	Moses Mabhida Stadium	54,000
Bidvest Wits	Johannesburg (Braamfontein)	Gauteng	Bidvest Stadium	5,000
Bloemfontein Celtic	Bloemfontein	Free State	Seisa Ramabodu Stadium	20,000
Free State Stars	Bethlehem	Free State	Charles Mopeli Stadium	35,000
Golden Arrows	Umlazi	Kwazulu-Natal	King Zwelithini Stadium	10,000
Kaizer Chiefs	Naturena, Johannesburg	Gauteng	FNB Stadium (Soccer City)	94,700
Mamelodi Sundowns	Chloorkop	Gauteng	Loftus Versfeld Stadium	52,000
Maritzburg United	Pietermaritzburg	Kwazulu-Natal	Harry Gwala Stadium	10,700
Moroka Swallows	Johannesburg (Soweto)	Gauteng	Dobsonville Stadium	24,000
Mpumalanga Black Aces	Linksfield, Johannesburg	Gauteng	Mbombela Stadium	40,900
Orlando Pirates	Johannesburg (Soweto)	Gauteng	Orlando Stadium	36,400
Platinum Stars	Rustenburg (Phokeng)	North West	Royal Bafokeng Stadium	45,000
Polokwane City	Polokwane	Limpopo	Peter Mokaba Stadium	41,733
Supersport United	Groenkloof Campus, Pretoria	Gauteng	Lucas Moripe Stadium	28,900
Tuks FC	Pretoria	Gauteng	Tuks Stadium	8,000

Location of teams in the 2013–14 PSL.

=== Personnel and kits ===
Team	Manager	Supplier	Shirt sponsor
Ajax Cape Town	(South Africa) Roger De Sa	Adidas	MTN
AmaZulu	(South Africa) Craig Rosslee	Kappa	SPAR
Bidvest Wits	(South Africa) Gavin Hunt	Kappa	Bidvest
Polokwane City	(South Africa) Boebie Solomons	Kappa	Vacant
Bloemfontein Celtic	(Germany) Ernst Middendorp	Reebok	MTN
Free State Stars	Vacant	Maxed	Bonitas
Golden Arrows	Vacant	Millé	Vacant
Kaizer Chiefs	(Scotland) Stuart Baxter	Nike	Vodacom
Mamelodi Sundowns	(South Africa) Pitso Mosimane	Nike	Ubuntu Botho
Maritzburg United	(South Africa) Steve Komphela	Umbro	Vacant
Moroka Swallows	(Portugal) Zeca Marques	Puma	VW
Mpumalanga Black Aces	(South Africa) Clive Barker	Umbro	Lakama
Orlando Pirates	(Serbia) Vladimir Vermezovic	Adidas	Vodacom
Platinum Stars	(South Africa) Allan Freese	Umbro	The Royal Marang Hotel
Supersport United	(South Africa) Cavin Johnson	Kappa	Engen
Tuks FC	(South Africa) Steve Barker	Umbro	Vacant

=== Managerial changes ===
Team	Outgoing manager	Manner of departure	Date of vacancy	Position in table	Incoming manager	Date of appointment
Bidvest Wits	(South Africa) Clive Barker	Caretaker period ended	May 2013	End of season	(South Africa) Gavin Hunt	29 May 2013
Supersport United	(South Africa) Gavin Hunt	Quit	29 May 2013	End of season	(South Africa) Cavin Johnson	2 July 2013
Platinum Stars	(South Africa) Cavin Johnson	Quit	2 July 2013	End of season	(South Africa) Allan Freese	29 July 2013
Mpumalanga Black Aces	(South Africa) Jacob Sakala	Promoted to Technical Director	4 July 2013	End of season	(South Africa) Clive Barker	4 July 2013
Polokwane City	(South Africa) Duncan Lechesa	Quit	17 September 2013	16th	(South Africa) Boebie Solomons	21 October 2013
Golden Arrows	(South Africa) Manqoba Mngqithi	Quit	5 October 2013	13th	(England) Mark Harrison	7 October 2013
Bloemfontein Celtic	(South Africa) Clinton Larsen	Quit	7 October 2013	11th	(Germany) Ernst Middendorp	11 October
Maritzburg United	(Germany) Ernst Middendorp	Quit	10 October 2013	9th	(South Africa) Clinton Larsen	15 October
Free State Stars	(South Africa) Steve Komphela	Sacked	1 December 2013	11th		

== League table ==
Pos	Team	Pld	W	D	L	GF	GA	GD	Pts	Qualification or relegation
1	Mamelodi Sundowns (C)	30	20	5	5	51	25	+26	65	Qualification for 2015 CAF Champions League
2	Kaizer Chiefs	30	19	6	5	43	17	+26	63	Qualification for 2015 CAF Champions League
3	Bidvest Wits	30	16	8	6	34	20	+14	56	Qualification for 2015 CAF Confederation Cup
4	Orlando Pirates	30	13	7	10	30	22	+8	46	Qualification for 2015 CAF Confederation Cup
5	SuperSport United	30	12	8	10	38	36	+2	44	
6	Bloemfontein Celtic	30	10	13	7	35	32	+3	43	
7	Mpumalanga Black Aces	30	12	7	11	34	33	+1	43	
8	Platinum Stars	30	11	9	10	32	32	0	42	
9	AmaZulu	30	11	9	10	27	35	−8	42	
10	Maritzburg United	30	10	8	12	34	37	−3	38	
11	University of Pretoria	30	10	5	15	25	28	−3	35	
12	Ajax Cape Town	30	9	8	13	27	36	−9	35	
13	Moroka Swallows	30	8	7	15	29	39	−10	31	
14	Free State Stars	30	7	8	15	32	43	−11	29	
15	Polokwane City (O)	30	7	7	16	31	43	−12	28	Qualification for the relegation play-offs
16	Golden Arrows (R)	30	6	3	21	26	50	−24	21	Relegation to National First Division

Source: RSSSF
Rules for classification: 1) points; 2) goal difference; 3) number of goals scored.
(C) Champions; (O) Play-off winners; (R) Relegated

== Prize money ==
Position	Prize money (ZAR)
1	10m
2	5m
3	3m
4	2m
5	1.5m
6	1.3
7	1.1m
8	1m
9	750k
10	700k
11	650k
12	600k
13	550k
14	500k
15	450k
16	400k

== Statistics ==
=== Top scorers ===
Rank	Player	Club	Goals
1	(South Africa) Bernard Parker	Kaizer Chiefs	10

== See also ==
- CAF 5 Year Ranking
