= Allan Freese =

South African soccer player and coach

Personal information
- Full name: Allan Earel Freese
- Date of birth: 7 July 1956 (age 70)
- Place of birth: Estcourt, South Africa
- Positions: Left-back; left winger

Team information
- Current team: Magesi F.C. (manager)

Senior career*
Years	Team	Apps	(Gls)
- Dynamos
- Leicester City (South Africa)
- Orlando Pirates
- Benoni United

Managerial career
- 2012: Platinum Stars
- 2013–2015: Platinum Stars
- 2015–2016: Highlands Park
- 2017: Royal Eagles
- 2020: AmaZulu
- 2020–2021: Free State Stars
- 2021: Richards Bay
- 2021–?: Cape Town All Stars
- 2026–: Magesi
- * Club domestic league appearances and goals

Allan Freese (born 7 July 1956) is a South African former soccer player and coach. As of February 2026, he coaches Magesi.

== Coaching career ==
Freese was replaced as Highlands Park head coach by Gordon Igesund after five league games into the 2016–17 Premiership season and redeployed into the club's development coaching. He acted as the club's Head of Development before he took up a role as head coach with Royal Eagles in the National First Division (NFD), when their coach, Kosta Papic, had taken ill. Freese took permanent charge of the team still in the NFD at the start of the 2017–18 season, but following a poor start to their campaign, separated with Royal Eagles after just four matches.

His former club Highlands Park F.C roped him in as assistant coach to longtime friend Owen Da Gama following their failed debut Premiership season. They led the club to successful promotion campaign where they broke numerous records in a swift return to Premiership. Together they led the club to 7th position finish on the table in the 2018–19 season.

Following the sale of his former club Highlands Park, Freese joined AmaZulu as an assistant coach for the 2020–21 season.

Freese joined Magesi in February 2026, with the club bottom after 15 matches.

== Honours ==
=== Platinum Stars ===
- 2013 MTN 8
- 2013 Telkom Knockout

=== Highlands Park ===
2015/16 PSL Promotion Playoffs Champion
