= Terry Ouko =

Kenyan football administrator

Teresa Ouko Calleb
Personal information
- Full name: Teresa Ouko Calleb
- Date of birth: 26 December 1987 (age 38)
- Height: 1.83 m (6 ft 0 in)

Youth career
- 2010: Coastal Queens

Senior career*
Years	Team	Apps	(Gls)
- Spedag
2012	Matuu Sports	25	

International career^{‡}
	Kenya U20	4	(0)
	Harambee Starlets	43	(0)
- * Club domestic league appearances and goals as of 22 Apr 2025 ‡ National team caps and goals as of 22 Apr 2025

Teresa Ouko Calleb, commonly known as Terry Ouko, is a retired Kenyan female footballer now serving as the Vice President of the Kenya's player union, KEFWA, and as a Diversity & Anti-Discrimination Manager with world football governing body, FIFA. She is a member of two FIFPRO committees; Finance & Professionalization as well as Diversity and Inclusion (EDI), and serves on the Confederation Africaine de Football (CAF) Executive Committee for Women's Football. She also works with the Uni Global World Players Association representing over 85,000 players across more than 100 countries. Besides all this, Terry sits in Kenya's steering committee overseeing preparations for the CHAN 2024 and the 2027 Africa Cup of Nations, and is an avid sports writer.

== Football career ==
Terry began her football journey in school before joining Coastal Queens FC where she was spotted during a nationwide U23 tournament, Sakata Ball. That earned her a place in the National Youth Talent Academy (NYTA), club sides Spedag and Matuu FC.

She turned out for Kenya U20 women's team and the national team Harambee Starlets between 2009 and 2016 before going into football administration. She was part of the squad at the 2016 CECAFA Women's Championship in September 2016 where Kenya lost to Tanzania in the finals.

== Transition to Administration and Advocacy ==
After retiring from active play, Terry transitioned into football administration. She joined KEFWA in 2015 and went on to become the communication manager from 2017. She briefly served as an acting secretary general at the organization before being elected to the vice chair's position in May 2023. In 2019 she co-founded Tuungane CBO Kilifi with a vision to mentor youth through sports and education.

In June 2022 she was incorporated to the FIFPRO Board member (Africa division), and as a member of the organizing committee for women's football by CAF. After her tenure as a FIFPRO Board member, Terry moved to the FIFPRO's Finance and Professionalization committee, and in July 2025 she was handed a new portfolio by joining the FIFPRO's Equity, Diversity and Inclusion (EDI) Committee.

She is instrumental in advocating for players' rights and her efforts include promoting mental health awareness, supporting injured players, and negotiating for fair contracts and wages. In 2024, she was honored with the African Women in Sports (AWIS) Leadership Award for her outstanding contributions to sports.

== Education ==
Terry holds a Bachelor of Arts in Communication Development from St. Paul's University and recently completed the FIFA Master – International MA in management, Law and Humanities of Sport from De Montfort University.

== Personal life ==
Terry comes from a sporty family. Her elder sibling Felix 'Toti' Ochieng is a former player and head coach of Kenya Sevens.

== Awards ==
Coastal Queens

- Sakata Ball Best defender (Coast): 2010

Matuu FC

- Kenyan Women's Premier League: 2012 Champions

Kenya

- CECAFA Women's Championship runner-up: 2016
