= SAFPU =

SAFPU may refer to:

- Singapore Armed Forces Provost Unit, now SAF Military Police Command
- South African Football Players Union
