= Madela =

Madela is a surname. Notable people with the surname include:

- Jed Madela (born 1977), Filipino singer and songwriter
- Ntuthuko Madela (born 1997), South African footballer
