= Highlands Park F.C. (1990) =

- Full name: Highlands Park Football Club
- Nickname(s): The Lions of the North
- Founded: January 1990
- Dissolved: December 1992 (bought by the Welkom Eagles)
- Ground: Balfour Park Stadium, Highlands North, Johannesburg
- Capacity: 13,500
- League: National Soccer League
- 1992 season: 18th

Highlands Park Football Club were a South African soccer club based in Highlands North, Johannesburg. The club was founded in 1990 as a successor to the original Highlands Park, founded in 1959, following the sale of the club's license to Jomo Sono and the formation of Jomo Cosmos. and They were promoted to play in the National Soccer League for the 1991 season. After the 1991 season, the club had played well enough to avoid relegation, and was then bought by the relegated NSL club Port Elizabeth Blackpool, as part of a merger deal, where the new team continued to play in Johannesburg and continued to compete with the name "Highlands Park FC". When this merged club, once again had managed to avoid relegation after the 1992-season, this at the same time meant, that they ceased to exist. The professional side of the club and its NSL licence, were bought by the new club Welkom Eagles, with a relocation of the team for the 1993 season, now to play 267 km away from Highlands North, in the city known as Welkom.

== History ==
After the professional club had been sold, and ceased to exist in February 1983, the amateur side of the team and the "Balfour Park Juniors" continued to exist as independent teams, still playing at the Balfour Park Stadium. Some years later, the junior team merged with North City F.C., and the base of the club moved 4 km south from the previous Balfour Park Stadium, now to be located at Gemmel Park in Linksfield. The name of the merged junior club, however continued to be "Balfour Park juniors". In 1990 a newly formed professional team with the name Highlands Park FC, was created at the top of the amateur club. This new phoenix club, straight away managed to get promoted to play in the 1991 National Soccer League, where the club finished at a respectable 9th place. Fellow National Soccer League team Port Elizabeth Blackpool then opted to purchase the franchise and perform a merger with the club, after their own relegation in the same season. The name of the new merged club continued to be "Highlands Park FC", and the home matches of the club also continued to be played in Johannesburg. After the club also in the next season, had managed to play well enough to avoid relegation, the team however ceased to exist, as the club's sponsor Sharp Electronics did not want to prolong their sponsorship. Hence the club was forced to shut down, and sell their league licence to new owners. The new owners created a new club Welkom Eagles, to play in Welkom and replace "Highlands Park FC" in the National Soccer League 1993. As the city Welkom is located 267 kilometres southwest of Highlands North in Johannesburg, the new owners only had interest to buy the club's league licence and professional players, while the junior teams and senior amateur teams were not a part of the deal, and remained to exist as an independent amateur club for the following years, with matches still to be played at the Balfour Park Stadium. A new phoenix club, again known as Highlands Park were formed in 2003.
