= Munganga =

Munganga is a Congolese surname. Notable people with the surname include:

- Jean Munganga (born 1990), Congolese footballer
- Kasongo Munganga (born 1944), Congolese politician and monetarist
- Nelson Munganga (born 1993), Congolese football player
