= COSAFA Awards =

South African association football award

- Current: 2023 COSAFA Awards
- Awarded for: Excellence in football
- Date: 9 May 2024
- Location: Sandton Convention Centre
- Country: South Africa
- Presented by: COSAFA
- Hosted by: Carol Tshabalala
- First award: 9 May 2024
- Website: https://cosafa.com/category/cosafa-awards/

The COSAFA Awards are an awards evening held to honour the best players and coaches of Southern African association football. It is conferred by COSAFA. The judging panel comprises representation from across the 14 member nations that make up COSAFA.

== History ==
The inaugural awards and nominees were announced on 5 April 2024 with the ceremony scheduled for 19 April 2024, which was later postponed to 9 May 2024. The first ceremony took place at the Sandton Convention Centre on 9 May 2024.

== Current Awards ==
=== Men’s Player of the Year Award ===
| Year | Winner |
|---|---|
| 2023 | Percy Tau |

=== Women’s Player of the Year Award ===
| Year | Winner |
|---|---|
| 2023 | Racheal Kundananji |

=== Men’s Coach of the Year Award ===
| Year | Winner |
|---|---|
| 2023 | Rulani Mokwena |

=== Men’s Goalkeeper of the Year Award ===
| Year | Winner |
|---|---|
| 2023 | Ronwen Williams |

=== Women’s Goalkeeper of the Year Award ===
| Year | Winner |
|---|---|
| 2023 | Andile Dlamini |

=== Men’s Most Promising Player Award ===
| Year | Winner |
|---|---|
| 2023 | Thapelo Maseko |

=== Women’s Most Promising Player Award ===
| Year | Winner |
|---|---|
| 2023 | Leticia Chinyamula |

=== Women’s Coach of the Year Award ===
| Year | Winner |
|---|---|
| 2023 | Desiree Ellis |

=== Most promising referee ===
| Year | Winner |
|---|---|
| 2023 | Tsiaro Randriambololoma |

=== Best female referee ===
| Year | Winner |
|---|---|
| 2023 | Diana Chikotesha |

=== Best male referee ===
| Year | Winner |
|---|---|
| 2023 | Jerson Dos Santos |

=== Referee legend ===
| Year | Winner |
|---|---|
| 2023 | Victor Gomes |
