= 2013 Telkom Knockout =

Tournament details
- Country: South Africa
- Dates: 4 October-7 December
- Teams: 16

Final positions
- Champions: Platinum Stars
- Runners-up: Orlando Pirates

The 2013 Telkom Knockout was the 32nd edition of the Telkom Knockout, a South African cup competition comprising the 16 teams in the Premiership. It took place between October and December 2013. The final was won by Platinum Stars, who upset Orlando Pirates.

Stars had also defeated Pirates in the 2013 MTN 8 final earlier in the season.

== Results ==
=== Final ===
7 December 2013

Platinum Stars	2–1	Orlando Pirates

Mbombela Stadium
