= Carlington Nyadombo =

Zimbabwean footballer (born 1985)

Personal information
- Full name: Carlington Nyadombo
- Date of birth: 25 December 1985 (age 40)
- Place of birth: Makoni, Zimbabwe
- Position: Centre back

Team information
- Current team: Tshakhuma
- Number: 37

Senior career*
Years	Team	Apps	(Gls)
–2010	Gunners		
2010–2015	AmaZulu	103	(4)
2015–2016	Polokwane City	15	(0)
2017	Royal Eagles	12	(0)
2017–2020	Tshakhuma	68	(3)
2020–2021	Steenberg United	13	(2)

International career^{‡}
2012–2014	Zimbabwe	9	(0)
- * Club domestic league appearances and goals as of 11 November 2022 ‡ National team caps and goals as of 11 November 2022

Carlington Nyadombo (born 25 December 1985) is a Zimbabwean footballer who played as a defender, among others for Zimbabwe.
