= Kenya Footballers Welfare Association =

KEFWA
- Formation: 2011
- Location: Nairobi, Kenya
- Region served: Kenya
- Official language: English, Swahili
- President: James Situma
- Affiliations: FIFPro
- Staff: 4
- Website: www.kefwa.com, www.kefwamedia.com

The Kenya Footballers Welfare Association, generally referred to as KEFWA, is a sports union for football players. Its headquarters are in Nairobi, Kenya. KEFWA has Victor Wanyama and Denis Oliech as the honorary President and Vice President respectively.

== History ==
KEFWA was formed in September 2011 in response to a perceived need to defend the rights of professional football players who at times are treated unfairly by employers (football clubs). The association's stated intent is to act on behalf of the players in contract disputes, non payment of salaries, underpayment of players and improper insurance cover.

== Administration ==
President : James Situma

Vice President : Terry Ouko

Secretary General : Dan Makori

Recruitment and welfare Officer : Victor Ashinga

Software Engineer : Savio Wambugu

Cinematographer : Noah Okeyo

Photographer : Lenny Towett

Front Office Administrator : Rukia Yusuf

Media Liaison Officer : Paul Ombati

== Mission statement ==
KEFWA represents both male and female footballers in Kenya and works to improve the future of current and former players.

== See also ==
- Football in Kenya
