= Levy Mashiane =

South African soccer player (born 1996)

Personal information
- Date of birth: 17 March 1996 (age 30)
- Position: Midfielder

Team information
- Current team: Polokwane City
- Number: 28

Senior career*
Years	Team	Apps	(Gls)
2017–2019	Royal Eagles	50	(6)
2019–2025	Royal AM	89	(12)
2025–	Polokwane City	7	(0)
- * Club domestic league appearances and goals as of 4 January 2026

Levy Mashiane (born 17 March 1996) is a South African professional soccer player who plays as a midfielder for South African Premier Division club Polokwane City.
