= Ntuthuko Madela =

South African soccer player

Personal information
- Date of birth: 23 June 1997 (age 29)
- Position: Defender

Team information
- Current team: Polokwane City

Senior career*
Years	Team	Apps	(Gls)
2019–2022	AmaZulu	3	(0)
2020	→ Jomo Cosmos (loan)	9	(0)
2021	→ Royal AM (loan)	1	(0)
2022–	Polokwane City	4	(0)
- * Club domestic league appearances and goals as of 23 October 2022

Ntuthuko Madela (born 23 June 1997) is a South African soccer player who plays as a defender for Polokwane City.
