= Boban Zirintusa =

Ugandan footballer (born 1992)

Personal information
- Full name: Boban Zirintusa Bogere
- Date of birth: 2 February 1992 (age 34)
- Place of birth: Jinja, Jinja District, Uganda
- Height: 1.82 m (5 ft 11 1/2 in)
- Position: Midfielder

Team information
- Current team: Mtibwa
- Number: 7

Senior career*
Years	Team	Apps	(Gls)
2006–2007	Vipers S.C.	26	(14)
2016	SC Villa	28	(10)
2008–2009	Simba S.C.	28	(8)
2009–2013	Mtibwa	44	(16)
2013–2014	Highfield	24	(9)
2013–2014	Dynamos	22	(10)
2014–2015	Polokwane City	31	(13)
2017	Buildcon F.C	6	(0)
2018	Mohun Bagan	0	(0)
2019–	KJSS FC	10	(6)
2020–	Mtibwa		

International career^{‡}
2010–2012	Uganda national under-20	9	(1)
2012–2014	Uganda U23	6	(0)
2013–2014	Uganda	2	(0)
- * Club domestic league appearances and goals as of 16 July 2017 ‡ National team caps and goals as of 16 July 2017

Boban Zirintusa Bogere (born 2 February 1992) is a Ugandan professional footballer who plays as a midfielder for Mtibwa in Tanzania Premier League and for the Uganda national team.

Boban has previously played in Vipers and Simba in Tanzania, Mtibwa Sugar in Tanzania, Dynamos and Highfield in Zimbabwe, Polokwane City in South Africa, Buildcon in Zambia and Ethiopian Coffee in Ethiopia.

== Club career ==
=== Vipers ===
Boban arrived at the club in 2006 mid-season on a crisis landing. He was signed by Coach Charles Ayiekoh to strengthen the team at a time of fighting relegation during Vipers maiden season in the top flight league. He was part of that historical team which survived relegation by a thread following a 4-1 drubbing of Kampala United in a second last match to the 2006 league closer before leaving Vipers in 2008.

=== Dynamos ===
He joined Dynamos from Highfield F.C. in January 2013. Boban Zirintusa scored on his Dynamos debut as the Harare giants cruised to an easy Champions League preliminary round first leg victory over Lesotho Correctional Services F.C at Rufaro stadium. Boban came on as a substitute for Tichaona Mabvura in the 68th minute.

=== Polokwane City ===
Boban joined Polokwane city F.C in October 2014 from Dynamos. Boban who was a second-half substitute, netted his first strike on his debut for Polokwane after an assist by Essau Kanyenda in the 47th minute to help Polokwane City stop Bidvest Wits 2–0 in an ABSA League.

=== Buildcon ===
On 24 July 2017, Zirintusa agreed terms with Zambian club Buildcon Football club and joined them.

=== Ethiopian Coffee Sports Club ===
In January 2018, Boban joined Ethiopian Coffee Sports Club.

=== Kirinya–Jinja Senior Secondary School ===
In September 2019, he joined Kirinya–Jinja Senior Secondary School FC. He made his debut against Bul FC.

=== Mtibwa ===
In January 2020, Boban rejoined Mtibwa.

== International career ==
Boban passed through national football team set ups, he played for Uganda U20, Uganda U23 up to the senior team, however he made his senior national team debut during the 2014 Brazil World Cup qualifiers Uganda against Liberia, on 24 March 2013 at Samuel K.Doe Sports Stadium in Monrovia.

== Honours ==
Dynamos

- Zimbabwe Premier Soccer League: 2013
- Zimbabwean Independence Trophy: 2013

Uganda

- CECAFA Cup: 2009, 2013
