= 2013 MTN 8 =

Tournament details
- Country: South Africa
- Teams: 8

Final positions
- Champions: Platinum Stars (1st title)
- Runners-up: Orlando Pirates

Tournament statistics
- Matches played: 6
- Goals scored: 20 (3.33 per match)
- Top goal scorer: S. Mthembu (Platinum Stars) 3

The 2013 MTN 8 was the 39th tournament of South Africa's annual football (soccer) cup competition. It featured the top eight teams of the Premier Soccer League table at the end of the 2012-13 season.

It was won by Platinum Stars.

== Teams ==
The eight teams that competed in the MTN 8 knockout competition are listed below according to their finishing position in the 2012-13 season.

- Kaizer Chiefs
- Platinum Stars
- Orlando Pirates
- Bidvest Wits
- Bloemfontein Celtic
- Supersport United
- Free State Stars
- University of Pretoria

== Quarter finals ==
9 August 2013
18:00

Bidvest Wits	3 – 0	Bloemfontein Celtic
S. Vilakazi 21'; G. Kebedel 22'; P. Faty 90'; K. Wolff (yellow card) (yellow-red card)	Report

Bidvest Stadium, Braampark
Attendance: 5,000

10 August 2013
15:00

Platinum Stars	3 – 0	Free State Stars
B. Mhlongo 25'; S. Mthembu 73'; M. Ngele 80'; T. Gumede (yellow card)	Report	(yellow card) K. Mashego

Royal Bafokeng Stadium, Phokeng
Attendance: 1,913

10 August 2013
20:15

Kaizer Chiefs	3 – 0	University of Pretoria
T. Mashamaite 5'; M. Mathoho 63'; S. Tshabalala 70'	Report	(yellow card) M. Matsi; (yellow card) L. Mathosi

FNB Stadium, Soweto
Attendance: 10,000

11 August 2013
15:00

Orlando Pirates	2 – 2 (a.e.t.)	SuperSport United
L. Bacela 60'; L. Bacela 112'	Report	30' M. Niang; 91' M. Gabonamong; (yellow card) (yellow-red card) Sibusiso Khumalo
Penalties
Jali (penalty missed); Erasmus (penalty scored); Mahamutsa (penalty scored); Bacela (penalty scored); Lekgwathi (penalty scored)	4–3	(penalty missed) Williams; (penalty scored) Niang; (penalty scored) Maluleke; (penalty missed) September; (penalty scored) Fransman

Mbombela Stadium, Nelspruit

=== Semi finals ===
Team 1	Agg.	Team 2	1st leg	2nd leg
Kaizer Chiefs (South Africa)	1 - 2	(South Africa) Orlando Pirates	0–1	1–1
Platinum Stars (South Africa)	6 - 3	(South Africa) Bidvest Wits	4–2	2–1

==== 1st leg ====
24 August 2013
15:00

Kaizer Chiefs	0 – 1	Orlando Pirates
W. Katsande (yellow card); S. Gaxa (yellow card)	Report	12' D. Klate; (yellow card) L. Bacela; (yellow card) H. Jele; (yellow card) R. Mahamutsa; (yellow card) S. Meyiwa

FNB Stadium, Soweto
25 August 2013
15:00

Platinum Stars	4 – 2	Bidvest Wits
S. Mthembu 56'; M. Ngele 62'; S. Mthembu 71'; H. Botes 75'	Report	48' R. Chapman; 83' G. Kebede; (yellow card) M. Pattison; (yellow card) P. Faty

Royal Bafokeng Stadium, Phokeng

==== 2nd leg ====
24 September 2013
15:00

Orlando Pirates	1 – 1	Kaizer Chiefs
L. Bacela 76' (pen.); D. Klate (yellow card) 15'; L. Bacela (yellow card) 28'; R. Mahamutsa (yellow card) 54'; T. Gabuza (yellow card) 90'		37' B. Parker; (yellow card) 10' W. Katsande; (yellow card) 66' K. Nkhatha; (yellow card) 68' B. Parker; (yellow card) 70' K. Musona; (yellow card) 75' T. Mashamaite; (yellow card) 90' T. Masilele

Orlando Stadium, Soweto
24 September 2013
19:30

Bidvest Wits	1 – 2	Platinum Stars
D. Mukamba 71'		59' R. Ng'ambi; 77' R. Ng'ambi

Bidvest Stadium, Braampark

== Final ==
28 September 2013
20:15

Orlando Pirates	1 – 1 (a.e.t.)	Platinum Stars
T. Matlaba 83'		47' R. Ng'ambi
Penalties
Jali (penalty scored); Mahamutsa (penalty missed); Mabena (penalty missed); Bacela (penalty missed)	1–3	(penalty scored) Mere; (penalty scored) Botes; (penalty scored) Ngele; (penalty missed) Chinyama
