= Modderfontein Stadium =

Sports venue in South Africa

Modderfontein Sports Club
- Modder
- Interactive map of Modderfontein Sports Club
- Location: Modderfontein Sports Club, Modderfontein, Lethabong, Johannesburg municipality, Gauteng, South Africa
- Coordinates: 26.099357°S 28.167143°E
- Owner: Heartland
- Operator: Lee Carter

Construction
- Renovated: 2012
- Expanded: 2012

Tenant
- Highlands Park FC

Modderfontein Stadium is a multi-use stadium situated in Modderfontein, which is a part of the Johannesburg Municipality, in the Gauteng province in South Africa. Currently, it is mostly used to host football matches.

== Football related tenants ==
- Until 2009, the stadium was used as headquarters and training ground by Platinum Stars F.C.; they transferred to the Royal Bafokeng Sports Complex in 2009.
- When Highlands Park FC won promotion for Vodacom League in June 2007, the club decided to move their training and home venue to the Modderfontein Sports Club. As of June 2011, this is still the home venue of the club.
