= Henrico Botes =

Namibian football striker

Personal information
- Full name: Henrico Botes
- Date of birth: 24 December 1979 (age 46)
- Place of birth: Rehoboth, South West Africa
- Height: 1.89 m (6 ft 2 1/2 in)
- Position: Striker

Team information
- Current team: Bidvest Wits
- Number: 21

Senior career*
Years	Team	Apps	(Gls)
1999–2003	Young Ones		
2003–2005	Ramblers		
2005–2007	Moroka Swallows	39	(9)
2007–2014	Platinum Stars	127	(24)
2014–2016	Bidvest Wits	52	(7)
2016–2017	Platinum Stars	29	(3)
2017–2018	University of Pretoria FC	21	(2)

International career^{‡}
2001–2014	Namibia	21	(4)
- * Club domestic league appearances and goals as of 16:51, 27 October 2013 (UTC) ‡ National team caps and goals as of 16:51, 27 October 2013 (UTC)

Henrico Botes (born 24 December 1979) is a former Namibian football striker. He played for Platinum Stars, Bidvest Wits and University of Pretoria F.C. in the South African Premier Soccer League and Namibia national team. He is a striker that his coaches have always believed in due to his functionality.

He has also captained the national team.

He missed most of the 07–08 season and the 2008 African Nations Cup due to injury.

On 31 November 2016, Botes scored penalty in Platinum Stars’ 3-1 defeat to Free State Stars in a league match, which was his 50th goal in 195 starts since he started playing in the PSL in 2005.
