= Polokwane City F.C. =

Association football club

- Full name: Polokwane City Football Club
- Founded: 2012; 14 years ago
- Ground: Old Peter Mokaba Stadium
- Capacity: 15,000
- Chairman: Johnny Mogaladi
- Coach: Phuti Mohafe
- League: South African Premiership
- 2025–26: 7th
- Website: polokwanecityfc.co.za
| Home colours | Away colours |

Polokwane City Football Club is a South African professional football club based in the city of Polokwane in the Limpopo province that currently plays in the first tier South African Premiership. The team plays its home matches at the Peter Mokaba Stadium.

== History ==
Polokwane City FC was established in 2012 although after the owners of Bay United sold the franchise to the Mogaladi family. After playing in various temporary venues, the club was moved officially from Port Elizabeth to Polokwane City.

Bay United originally came into existence in 2006 when the franchise of the struggling National First Division club Maritzburg United was purchased and relocated to Port Elizabeth. The club spent one season in the Premier Soccer League, and the other years of its existence in the National First Division. Following the 2010–11 NFD season, the club's NFD franchise was moved to Polokwane, Limpopo.

In May 2013 City was promoted to the Premiership.

They won the 2022–23 National First Division on the final day, earning promotion to the 2023–24 Premiership.

== Honours ==
- National First Division
  - Champions: 2012–13, 2022–23

== November 2012 accident ==
Four of the club's players died in a traffic accident on 11 November 2012. The crash occurred on the R71 highway, near Polokwane as the players were returning from their match against FC AK. A 36-year-old man was arrested on suspicion of drunken and reckless driving. The deceased players were:

- Khomotso Silvester Mpaketsane (27) – born 13 April 1985 – joined the club in January 2011 (during Bay United F.C. season) and stayed after move to Polokwane
- Benjamin Moeketsi Nthete (23) – born 22 February 1989 – attacker who joined the club in 2012 on loan from Orlando Pirates
- Mojalefa Robert Mphuthi (21) – born 31 August 1991 – striker, nicknamed 'Small', who joined the club after it moved to Polokwane
- Koketso Isaiah Takalo (20) – born 15 February 1992 – left-wing, nicknamed 'Kaiser' or 'KK', who joined the club after it moved to Polokwane

=== League record ===
==== National First Division ====
- 2012–13 – 1st (promoted)

==== Premiership ====
- 2013–14 – 15th
- 2014–15 – 12th
- 2015–16 – 13th
- 2016–17 – 6th
- 2017–18 – 12th
- 2018–19 – 5th
- 2019–20 – 16th (relegated)

==== National First Division ====
- 2020–21 – 13th
- 2021–22 – 6th
- 2022–23 – 1st (promoted)

==== Premiership ====
- 2023–24 – 8th
- 2024–25 – 7th
- 2025–26 – 7th

== Current squad ==
Updated 16 August, 2025. Note: Flags indicate national team as defined under FIFA eligibility rules; some limited exceptions apply. Players may hold more than one non-FIFA nationality.

| No. | Pos. | Nation | Player |
|---|---|---|---|
| 1 | GK | RSA | Ayanda Ngwenya |
| 2 | DF | RSA | Thabang Matuludi |
| 3 | DF | RSA | Tlou Nkwe |
| 4 | DF | RSA | Bulelani Nikani |
| 5 | DF | RSA | Francious Baloyi |
| 6 | DF | RSA | Sapholwethu Kelepu |
| 7 | FW | RSA | Mokibelo Ramabu |
| 8 | MF | RSA | Thato Letshedi |
| 9 | FW | RSA | Hlayisi Chauke |
| 10 | MF | RSA | Puleng Marema |
| 11 | FW | RSA | Moremi Seketso |
| 14 | FW | RSA | Ndamulelo Maphangule |
| 15 | FW | RSA | Nyakala Raphadu |
| 16 | MF | RSA | Stevens Goovadia |
| 17 | MF | RSA | Bonginkosi Dlamini |
| 20 | FW | RSA | Raymond Daniels |

| No. | Pos. | Nation | Player |
|---|---|---|---|
| 21 | MF | MOZ | Manuel Kambala |
| 22 | DF | RSA | Sihle Makhubela |
| 23 | MF | RSA | Lerato Ntamane |
| 25 | MF | RSA | Simphiwe Sithole |
| 27 | FW | RSA | Rudzani Thobo |
| 28 | FW | RSA | Levy Mashiane |
| 29 | FW | RSA | Sibusiso Tshabalala |
| 30 | GK | RSA | Mashudu Makhavhu |
| 31 | DF | RSA | Sabelo Motsa |
| 33 | DF | RSA | Lebogang Mankga |
| 34 | DF | RSA | Lebohang Nkaki |
| 38 | MF | RSA | Keorapetse Sebone |
| 39 | FW | RSA | Keagile Malepe |
| 40 | GK | RSA | Lindokuhle Mathebula |
| 42 | DF | RSA | Surprise Manthosi |
| 50 | GK | KEN | Brian Bwire |

=== Foreigners ===
In the South African Premiership, only five non-South African nationals can be registered. Foreign players who have acquired permanent residency can be registered as locals. Namibians born before 1990 can be registered as South Africans.

- (Uganda) Boban Zirintusa
- (Zimbabwe) George Chigova
- (Zimbabwe) Carlington Nyadombo
- (Eswatini) Banele Sikhondze

permanent residency

- (Malawi) Essau Kanyenda

== Notable former coaches ==
- (Serbia) Vladislav Heric (1 July 2012 – 21 Jan 2013)
- (South Africa) Duncan Lechesa (22 Jan 2013 – 18 Sept 2013)
- (Brazil) Eduardo Schoeler (interim) (18 Sept 2013 – 20 Oct 2013)
- (South Africa) Boebie Solomons (20 Oct 2013 – 1 Sept 2014)
- (Serbia) Kosta Papić (5 Sept 2014 – 15 Oct 2015)
- (Brazil) Júlio Leal (12 Nov 2015 – 6 July 2016)
- (Belgium) Luc Eymael (6 July 2016 – 2018)
- (Slovakia) Jozef Vukušič (2018–2019)
