= Amour Patrick Tignyemb =

Cameroonian footballer

Patrick Tignyemb
Personal information
- Full name: Amour Patrick Tignyemb
- Date of birth: 14 June 1985 (age 41)
- Place of birth: Douala, Cameroon
- Height: 1.80 m (5 ft 11 in)
- Position: Goalkeeper

Senior career*
Years	Team	Apps	(Gls)
2003–2005	Coton Sport		
2006–2008	Tonnerre Yaoundé		
2008–2019	Bloemfontein Celtic	286	(0)
2019	Chippa United	10	(0)

International career
2010	Cameroon	2	(0)
- * Club domestic league appearances and goals

Amour Patrick Tignyemb (born 14 June 1985) is a Cameroonian former professional footballer who played as a goalkeeper.

== Club career ==
Tignyemb formerly played for Coton Sport and Tonnerre Yaoundé.

== International career ==
Tignyemb was part of the Cameroonian 2004 African Nations Cup team, who finished top of their group in the first round of competition, before losing in the quarter-finals to Nigeria. Tignyemb also competed at the 2008 Summer Olympics. He earned his first senior cap for his homeland on 9 February 2005 against Senegal.
