= South African Football Players Union =

Football trade union

SAFPU
- South African Football Players Union
- Founded: May 1997
- Headquarters: Braamfontein, South Africa
- Location: South Africa
- Members: 200
- Key people: President: Simba Marumo; General Secretary: Thulaganyo Gaoshubelwe
- Affiliations: COSATU, FIFPro
- Website: www.safpu.org

The South African Football Players Union (SAFPU) is a trade union that represents football (soccer) players in South Africa. It has a membership of approximately 1000 members who are all current players and about 159 former (retired) footballers. The union and is affiliated with the Congress of South African Trade Unions, and FifPro and FifPro Africa.

Simba Marumo served as president.
