= Taariq Fielies =

South African soccer player

Personal information
- Full name: Taariq Fielies
- Date of birth: 21 June 1992 (age 34)
- Place of birth: Cape Town, South Africa
- Height: 1.90 m (6 ft 3 in)
- Position: Defender

Team information
- Current team: AmaZulu
- Number: 12

Youth career
- Salt River FC
- –2009: Rygersdal FC
- 2009–2012: Ajax Cape Town

Senior career*
Years	Team	Apps	(Gls)
2012–2013	Ajax Cape Town	1	(0)
2013–2017	Milano United	28	(3)
2017–2023	Cape Town City	162	(7)
2023–	AmaZulu	60	(2)

International career^{‡}
2018–	South Africa	2	(0)
- * Club domestic league appearances and goals as of 4 January 2026 ‡ National team caps and goals as of 25 October 2023

Taariq Fielies (born 21 June 1992 in Cape Town) is a South African professional soccer player currently playing as a defender for AmaZulu in the South African Premier League.

== Club career ==
After playing for Salt River FC and Rygersdal FC in his early youth he joined the ranks of Ajax Cape Town in 2009. He made his debut for the first team in the home win (1–0) against Maritzburg United on 7 December 2012 by replacing Matthew Booth in the 64th minute.

== Career statistics ==
As of 29 January 2013

Club	League	Season	League		Cup		Continental		Other		Total	
Club	League	Season	Apps	Goals	Apps	Goals	Apps	Goals	Apps	Goals	Apps	Goals
Ajax Cape Town	Premier Soccer League	2012–13	1	0	0	0	0	0	-		1	0
Ajax Cape Town	Premier Soccer League	Career total	1	0	0	0	0	0	-		1	0
