= Mwape Musonda =

Zambian footballer (born 1990)

Personal information
- Full name: Mwape Musonda
- Date of birth: 8 November 1990 (age 36)
- Place of birth: Zambia
- Height: 1.79 m (5 ft 10 1/2 in)
- Position: Forward

Senior career*
| Years | Team | Apps | (Gls) |
| 2012 | Konkola Mine Police | | |
| 2013 | Zanaco | | |
| 2013–2014 | ASD Cape Town | | |
| 2015 | Orlando Pirates | 2 | (0) |
| 2015–2016 | Golden Arrows | 15 | (2) |
| 2016–2020 | Black Leopards | 107 | (50) |
| 2020–2021 | Hatta | 11 | (1) |
| 2021 | → Al-Sahel (loan) | | |
| 2021–2023 | Moroka Swallows | 33 | (7) |

International career^{‡}
| 2015– | Zambia | 6 | (2) |
- * Club domestic league appearances and goals as of 23:02, 19 November 2019 (UTC) ‡ National team caps and goals as of 6 October 2020

Mwape Musonda (born 8 November 1990) is a Zambian professional footballer who plays as a forward.
