= Siphelele Mthembu =

South African soccer player

Personal information
- Full name: Siphelele Promise Mthembu
- Date of birth: 15 August 1987 (age 39)
- Place of birth: Melmoth, South Africa
- Height: 1.82 m (5 ft 11 1/2 in)
- Position: Striker

Team information
- Current team: Baroka

Youth career
- Classic FC
- Maritzburg City
- 2008: Kaizer Chiefs

Senior career*
Years	Team	Apps	(Gls)
2008–2011	Orlando Pirates	36	(4)
2010–2011	→ Bloemfontein Celtic (loan)	18	(6)
2012	Golden Arrows	1	(0)
2012–2014	Platinum Stars	43	(10)
2014–2016	Kaizer Chiefs	27	(1)
2017–2018	Free State Stars	10	(2)
2018–2020	Cape Town City	34	(8)
2020–2022	AmaZulu	42	(2)
2022–2024	Pretoria Callies	42	(15)
2024–	Baroka	9	(1)

International career
2013–2014	South Africa	3	(0)
- * Club domestic league appearances and goals as of 14 November 2024

Siphelele Mthembu (born 15 August 1987) is a South African footballer who plays as a striker for Baroka.

== Early career ==
Mthembu joined the Kaizer Chiefs reserve team from Maritzburg City in 2008. During the 2007–08 season, Mthembu scored 25 goals in the KZN stream of the Vodacom League.

== Club career ==
He made his pre-season debut on 26 July 2008 in a 4–0 loss to Manchester United with Ryan Giggs, Wayne Rooney, Fraizer Campbell and Tom Cleverley. Mthembu came in for Gert Schalkwyk. came close to scoring after slotting the ball past Tomasz Kuszczak but was cleared off the line by Nemanja Vidic. Mthembu had to sign for Orlando Pirates after management won a legal dispute that his services belonged to the club. Mthembu failed to live up to expectations with the Buccaneers with not much playing time on offering. He had short stints with Bloemfontein Celtic and Golden Arrows, before moving to Dikwena at the start of 2012–13. He scored 4 goals in 9 league starts in his first season. By the end of his spell he had 10 goals in 30 league starts.

=== Kaizer Chiefs ===
Mthembu made his debut on 13 August 2014 after joining in July against Mpumalanga Black Aces winning 2–1. He scored his first Chiefs goal on 6 December 2014 in a 2–0 win over Orlando Pirates. Mthembu scored a usual hat-trick against EduSports on 21 February 2015, scoring all with his head at FNB Stadium.

=== Cape Town City ===
He joined Cape Town City in summer 2018 on a one-year contract with an option for a further year.

=== AmaZulu ===
After joining the club on a trial in September 2020, he joined AmaZulu in October 2020.
