= Júlio César Leal =

Brazilian football manager

Júlio César Leal Junior
Personal information
- Full name: Júlio César Leal Junior
- Date of birth: 13 April 1951 (age 75)
- Place of birth: Itajuba, Brazil

Managerial career
- Years: Team
- 1983: Vasco da Gama
- 1985–1987: United Arab Emirates
- 1991–1992: Brazil U-20
- 1995: Bahia
- 1995: Bragantino
- 1996: América (SP)
- 1997: Guarani
- 1998: Fluminense
- 1998: América (SP)
- 1998: América de Natal
- 1999: Sport
- 1999–2002: Coritiba
- 2003–2004: Remo
- 2004: Kazma
- 2004–2005: Flamengo
- 2006: Tanzania
- 2007: Yokohama FC
- 2007–2008: AmaZulu
- 2008–2010: Moroka Swallows
- 2011–2012: Orlando Pirates
- 2015–2016: Polokwane City

Júlio César Leal Junior (born April 13, 1951 in Itajuba, Brazil) is an association football manager.

Leal has coached clubs in Kuwait, Brazil, Japan, United States and South Africa.

He parted ways with Orlando Pirates on 4 April 2012, three weeks after being suspended.

Leal joined Polokwane City in November 2015, coached the club for one season which they finished in 13th place and parted ways with the club.

== Managerial statistics ==
Team	From	To	Record				
Team	From	To	G	W	D	L	Win %
Yokohama FC	2007	2007	12	1	2	9	8.33
Total			12	1	2	9	8.33
