= George Chigova =

Zimbabwean footballer (1991–2023)

Personal information
- Date of birth: 4 March 1991
- Place of birth: Harare, Zimbabwe
- Date of death: 15 November 2023 (aged 32)
- Height: 1.95 m (6 ft 5 in)
- Position: Goalkeeper

Youth career
- –2010: Aces Youth Soccer Academy

Senior career*
Years	Team	Apps	(Gls)
2010–2012	Gunners Harare		
2012–2014	Dynamos		
2014–2015	SuperSport United	0	(0)
2015–2020	Polokwane City	125	(0)
2020–2023	SuperSport United	7	(0)

International career
2011–2019	Zimbabwe	32	(0)
- * Club domestic league appearances and goals

George Chigova (4 March 1991 – 15 November 2023) was a Zimbabwean professional footballer who played as a goalkeeper, notably in South Africa for Premier Soccer League clubs Polokwane City and SuperSport United.

== Club career ==
In February 2014, it was announced that Chigova would join South African club SuperSport United for the 2014–15 season, having agreed a three-year contract. The transfer fee paid to Harare-based side Dynamos was reported as $120,000.

In July 2015, Chigova moved to Polokwane City, signing a three-year deal. He made his league debut for the club on 22 September 2015, keeping a clean sheet in a 0–0 draw with Orlando Pirates F.C.

== International career ==
In January 2014, coach Ian Gorowa invited him to be a part of the Zimbabwe squad for the 2014 African Nations Championship. He helped the team to a fourth-place finish after being defeated by Nigeria 1–0.

== Death ==
Chigova died on 15 November 2023 after collapsing at home. He was 32. Chigova had first collapsed while training with his club SuperSport in South Africa in July 2023. He was reported to have been diagnosed with a heart ailment and took a bit of time off the game.

== Honours ==
Zimbabwe

- COSAFA Cup: 2017, 2018
