= Simba Marumo =

South African soccer player

Personal information
- Full name: Hareaipha Marumo
- Date of birth: 6 January 1978 (age 48)
- Place of birth: Virginia, South Africa
- Height: 1.67 m (5 ft 6 in)
- Position: Striker

Youth career
- Randa Spears
- Harmony
- Inter Milan

Senior career*
Years	Team	Apps	(Gls)
1999–2000	Chernomorets Burgas	6	(1)
2000–2001	Septemvri Sofia	0	(0)
2001–2005	Mamelodi Sundowns	23	(7)
2005–2006	Moroka Swallows	15	(2)
2006–2010	Silver/Platinum Stars	72	(20)

International career^{‡}
2002	South Africa	1	(0)
- * Club domestic league appearances and goals as of 13 February 2011 ‡ National team caps and goals as of 13 February 2009

Hareaipha "Simba" Marumo (born 6 January 1978) is a South African former soccer player who played as a striker.

As a teenager, he played for Inter Milan's youth academy.

He later served as president of the South African Football Players Union.
