= FIFPRO =

Organization for professional footballers

FIFPRO World Players' Union
- Formation: 15 December 1965; 60 years ago
- Type: Professional football player organisation
- Location: Hoofddorp, Netherlands
- Region served: Worldwide
- Members: 70 full members
- Official language: English, French, Spanish
- Website: www.fifpro.org

The Fédération Internationale des Associations de Footballeurs Professionnels (transl. International Federation of Professional Footballers), generally referred to as FIFPRO, is the worldwide representative organisation for 70,000 professional footballers. FIFPRO, with its global headquarters in Hoofddorp, Netherlands, is made up of 70 national players' associations. In addition, there are four candidate members.

== History ==
On 15 December 1965, representatives of the French, Scottish, English, Italian and Dutch players' associations met in Paris, with the objective of setting up an international federation for footballers. In the second half of June 1966, the first FIFPRO congress took place in London, just before the start of the 1966 FIFA World Cup. The articles of association of FIFPRO were thereby adopted and the objectives accurately laid down. FIFPRO was responsible for increasing the solidarity between professional footballers and players' associations.

It was originally laid down that a congress would be held once every four years at a minimum. The latest congress was in Uruguay in October 2022.

FIFPRO has grown from a European organisation into a global network and has done much to support countries on other continents – Asia/Oceania, Africa, and North, Central and South America – in their efforts to set up players' associations.

FIFPRO tried to offer the players' associations or other interest associations the means for mutual consultation and co-operation to achieve their objectives. In addition, it wished to co-ordinate the activities of the different affiliated groups in order to promote the interests of all professional footballers. Indeed, FIFPRO likewise had in mind propagating and defending the rights of professional footballers. The emphasis was thereby laid on the freedom of the football player to be able to choose the club of his choice at the end of his contract. FIFPRO supported Belgian footballer Jean-Marc Bosman in his judicial challenge of the football transfer rules which led to the Bosman ruling in 1995.

In 2013, FIFPRO launched a legal challenge against the transfer system. Phillipe Piat, the FIFPRO president at the time, said "the transfer system fails 99% of players around the world, it fails football as an industry and it fails the world's most beloved game". According to the President of FIFPRO Division Europe Bobby Barnes, 28% of the money from a transfer fee is paid to agents, and many players are not paid on time or at all. He claims this leads to these players being "vulnerable targets of crime syndicates, who instigate match-fixing and threaten the very existence of credible football competitions". Writing for the BBC, Matt Slater said "professional footballers do not enjoy the same freedoms that almost every other EU worker does", and that "players look at US sport, and wonder why their career prospects are still constrained by transfer fees and compensation costs".

In recent years, FIFPRO has established itself as a leading reference in the football industry through player surveys and research into concussion, mental health, social media abuse, player workload monitoring, and more.

FIFPRO looks into securing a safe workspace for players, promoting their rights as ordinary workers. FIFPRO introduced new regulations to protect the rights of current and prospective mothers. These minimum conditions, agreed upon by FIFA and other governing bodies, offer women more job security and came into effect on 1 January 2021.

In the last five years, FIFPRO has repeatedly intervened to protect and enforce the rights of players to participate in an environment free from sexual misconduct, harassment, and abuse. FIFPRO is a firm advocate of ensuring that all people, including players, should be guaranteed and protected by human rights. In 2021, FIFPRO played an active role in the group evacuation of women's footballers and athletes from Afghanistan.

== Current board ==
FIFPRO’s member unions in June 2024 approved by an overwhelming majority governance recommendations to enhance the global representation of professional footballers following a review by management consultancy Oliver Wyman. An interim global board was elected, who will serve until November 2024 when a 12-person board will be elected at a General Assembly.

- Interim Board: Magnus Erlingmark (Sweden), Joaquim Evangelista (Portugal), Sergio Marchi (Argentina), Maheta Molango (Italy, Chief Executive of the Professional Footballers' Association for England), Geremi Njitap (Cameroon), Fernando Revilla (Peru), Stefano Sartori (Italy), Karin Sendel (Israel), Alejandro Sequeira (Costa Rica), David Terrier (France), Fraser Wishart (Scotland), Takuya Yamazaki (Japan).
- Secretary General: Stéphane Burchkalter

=== List of chairs ===
President	Country	Term
(England) Bobby Charlton	England	1966–?
(England) Gordon Taylor	England	1994–2005
(Netherlands) Theo van Seggelen	Netherlands	2005–2019
(France) Philippe Piat	France	2019–2024
(Argentina) Sergio Marchi	Argentina	2024–present

== Members ==
Founded on 15 December 1965, FIFPRO has 70 full members. Upon graduation to the next level, new members sign an affiliation agreement that promotes loyalty, integrity and fairness as well as principles of good governance, including open and transparent communications, democratic processes, checks and balances, solidarity and corporate social responsibility. Notably, two of the most preeminent nations in world football, Brazil and Germany, are not members of the FIFPRO.

=== Full members ===
Country	Association name	Member	FIFPRO
Argentina	Futbolistas Argentinos Agremiados (FAA)	2019	
Australia	Professional Footballers Australia (PFA)	1999	
Austria	Vereinigung der Fussballer (VdF)	2019	
Belgium	United Athletes (UA)	1992	
Bolivia	Federación Sindical de Futbolistas Profesionales de Bolivia (FABOL)	2007	
Bosnia and Herzegovina	Sindikat Profesionalnih Fudbalera u Bosni i Hercegovini (SPFBiH)	2020	
Botswana	Footballers Union of Botswana (FUB)	2016	
Bulgaria	Association of Bulgarian Footballers (ABF)	2008	
Canada	Professional Footballers Association Canada (PFACan)	2022	
Cameroon	Syndicat National des Footballeurs Camerounais (SYNAFOC)	2001	
Chile	Sindicato Interempresa de Futbolistas Profesionales de Chile (SIFUP)	2005	
Colombia	Asociación Colombiana de Futbolistas Profesionales (ACOLFUTPRO)	2007	
(Democratic Republic of the Congo) Congo, Democratic Republic of	Union des Footballeurs du Congo (UFC)	2010	
Costa Rica	Asociacion de Jugadores Profesionales (ASOJUPRO)	2011	
Croatia	Hrvatska Udruga Nogometni Sindikat (HUNS)	2012	
Cyprus	Pancyprian Footballers Association (PASP)	2005	
Czechia (Czech Republic)	Czech Association of Football Players (ČAFH)	2012	
Denmark	Spillerforeningen	1993	
Egypt	Egyptian Professional Footballers Association (EPFA)	2002	
England & Wales	Professional Footballers' Association (PFA)	1965	
Finland	Jalkapallon Pelaajayhdistys ry (JPY)	2001	
France	Union Nationale des Footballeurs Professionnels (UNFP)	1965	
Gabon	Association Nationale des Footballeurs Professionnels du Gabon (ANFPG)	2017	
Ghana	Professional Footballers Association of Ghana (PFAG)	2013	
Greece	Panhellenic Professional Football Players Association (PSAPP)	1977	
Guatemala	Sindicato de Futbolistas Profesionales de Guatemala (SIFUPGUA)	2014	
Honduras	Asociación de Futbolistas de Honduras (AFHO)	2017	
Hungary	Hivatásos Labdarúgók Szervezete (HLSZ)	1996	
Iceland	Leikmannasamtök Íslands / Icelandic PFA (IPFA)	2018	
Indonesia	Asosiasi Pesepakbola Profesional Indonesia (APPI)	2009	
India	Football Players' Association of India (FPAI)	2009	
(Republic of Ireland) Ireland	Professional Footballers' Association of Ireland (PFAI)	1996	
Israel	Israel Football Players Organization (IFPO)	2016	
Italy	Associazione Italiana Calciatori (AIC)	1968	
Japan	Japan Pro-footballers Association (JPFA)	2000	
Kenya	Kenya Footballers Welfare Association (KEFWA)	2018	
Korea, Republic of (South Korea)	Korea Pro-Footballer's Association (KPFA)	2019	
Kyrgyzstan	Association of Professional Football Players of the Kyrgyz Republic (APFKR)	2022	
Malaysia	Professional Footballers Association of Malaysia (PFAM)	2019	
Malta	Malta Football Players Association (MFPA)	2014	
Montenegro	Sindikat Profesionalnih Fudbalera Crne Gore (SPFCG)	2012	
Morocco	Union Marocaine des Footballeurs Professionnels (UMFP)	2019	
Netherlands	Vereniging van Contractspelers (VVCS)	1965	
New Zealand	New Zealand Professional Footballers' Association (NZPFA)	2004	
North Macedonia	Sindikat na fudbaleri na Makedonija (SFM)	2017	
Norway	Norske Idrettsutøveres Sentralorganisasjon (NISO)	2019	
Panama	Asociación de Futbolistas de Panamá (AFUTPA)	2018	
Paraguay	Futbolistas Asociados del Paraguay (FAP)	2013	
Peru	Agremiación de Futbolistas Profesionales del Perú (SAFAP)	2002	
Poland	Polski Zwiazek Pilkarzy (PZP)		
Portugal	Sindicato dos Jogadores Profissionais de Futebol (SJPF)	1985	
Qatar	Qatar Players Association (QPA)	2018	
Romania	Asociatia Fotbalistilor Amatori si Nonamatori (AFAN)	1998	
Scotland	Professional Footballers' Association Scotland (PFA Scotland)	1965	
Serbia	Sindikat Profesionalnih Fudbalera Nezavisnost (SPFN)	2009	
Slovakia	Únia Futbalových Profesionálov (UFP)	2021	
Slovenia	Sindikat Profesionalnih Igralcev Nogometa Slovenije (SPINS)	2005	
South Africa	South African Football Players Union (SAFPU)	2002	
Sweden	Spelarföreningen Fotboll i Sverige - Svenska Fotbollsspelare (SFS)	1990	
Switzerland	Swiss Association of Football Players (SAFP)	2002	
Türkiye (Turkey)	Turkish Professional Footballers Association (TPFD)	2019	
Ukraine	All-Ukrainian Association of Professional Football Players (AUAPFP)	2014	
United States of America	Major League Soccer Players Association (MLS Players Association)	2006	
Uruguay	Mutual Uruguaya de Futbolistas Profesionales (MUFP)	2019	
Uzbekistan	Uzbekistan Footballers Union (UFU)	2023	
Venezuela	Asociación Única de Futbolistas Profesionales de Venezuela (AUFPV)	2014	
Zambia	Footballers and Allied Workers Union of Zambia (FAWUZ)	2019	
Zimbabwe	Footballers Union of Zimbabwe (FUZ)	2010	

== FIFPRO World 11 ==
The FIFPRO World 11 are the best men's and women's teams of the year. FIFPRO invites all professional men's and women's footballers to compose the teams. Initially known as the FIFPRO World 11, the award began in 2005 and celebrated the best football players as voted by their peers. In 2009, FIFPRO partnered with FIFA, rebranding it as the FIFA FIFPRO World 11 while retaining its original format. From the 2024 edition onward, FIFPRO will independently manage the award, reverting to its original name, the FIFPRO World 11. Lionel Messi has the most ever appearances in the FIFPRO World 11 with 18 overall, followed by Cristiano Ronaldo with 15.

== FIFPRO Player of the Season (2005–2008) ==
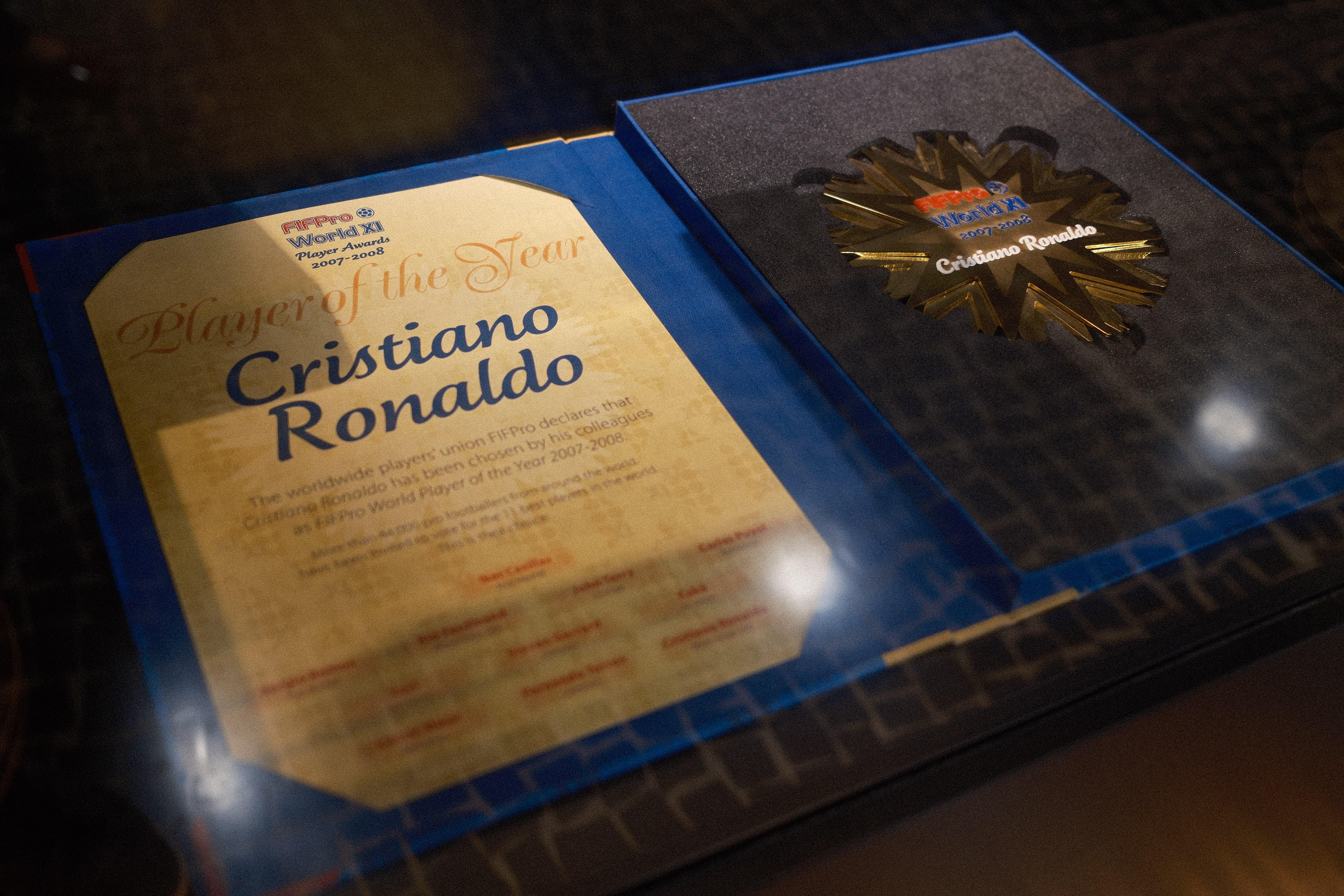
Cristiano Ronaldo's FIFPro World Player of the Year Award in the Museu CR7.

Year	Player	Club	Ref.
2005	(Brazil) Ronaldinho	(Spain) Barcelona	
2006	(Brazil) Ronaldinho	(Spain) Barcelona	
2007	(Brazil) Kaká	(Italy) Milan	
2008	(Portugal) Cristiano Ronaldo	(England) Manchester United	

FIFPRO granted this award from 2005 to 2008; in 2009 it merged with the FIFA World Player of the Year, which was succeeded by the FIFA Ballon d'Or in 2010 and later The Best FIFA Men's Player in 2016.

== FIFPRO Young Player of the Year (2005–2008) ==
Year	Player	Club	Ref.
2005	(England) Wayne Rooney	(England) Manchester United	
2006	(Argentina) Lionel Messi	(Spain) Barcelona	
2007	(Argentina) Lionel Messi	(Spain) Barcelona	
2008	(Argentina) Lionel Messi	(Spain) Barcelona	

FIFPRO granted this award from 2005 to 2008, after which it was discontinued.

== Social impact awards ==
=== FIFPRO Merit Awards ===
In 2008 FIFPRO established its Merit Award, to recognise professional footballers who have made a significant contribution to a charitable cause and are socially engaged. It honours players who use their platform to take action to improve the lives of people in need. The award is worth US$25,000 (as of 2018). Winners of the FIPRO Merit Award include:

- 2008 – Ibrahim Kargbo (Sierra Leone), ambassador of the Care Foundation in Sierra Leone
- 2009 – Shabani Nonda (DR Congo), for his foundation that organised annual football tournaments for 350 poor children in Kinshasa, and for his payment of school supplies and school fees, and for organising a Match for Peace (featuring other DR Congo players) to raise funds for victims of violence
- 2010 – Steven Bryce and Reynaldo Parks (Costa Rica), for their project to help children and young people in deprived neighbourhoods
- 2011 – Peres Center for Peace (Israel), for its Twinned Peace Sport Schools project, which annually engages thousands of children from Israel and the Palestinian Authority, and promotes peace between Israelis and Palestinians
- 2012 – Japan Pro-Footballers Association (JPFA), for their charity work for the victims of the 2011 Japanese tsunami
- 2013 – Stiliyan Petrov (Bulgaria), for his leukaemia foundation
- 2014 – Héctor Santibanez, for a football school for children with Down syndrome
- 2015 – Kei Kamara and Michael Lahoud (Sierra Leone), for Schools for Salone, a charity that builds schools
- 2016 – Haley Carter (USA), for raising support for the Afghan women's team
- 2017 – Mihai Nesu (Romania), for building a recovery centre for disabled children
- 2018 – Awer Mabil (Australia), for his charity Barefoot to Boots, providing essentials and football equipment for children in Kakuma refugee camp, Kenya
- 2019 – Johanna Omolo (Kenya), for his foundation that supplies poor children with essentials in Dandora, Kenya

In 2020 the format changed, and four awards were given:

- Player Activism: a player who advocates for a cause to bring about political or social change
- Player Impact: a player who acts to create a positive impact in others' lives
- Player Voice: players who use their platform to raise their voice (and sometimes others) to create awareness or help bring about change with regard to an issue within the football industry
- FIFPRO Hero: a player who has done something extraordinary and special, needing acknowledgement by FIFPRO.

2020

- Player Activism: Javiera Moreno, for fighting sexual abuse in women's football
- Player Impact: Marcus Rashford, for organising free school meals for disadvantaged children in the UK
- Player Voice: Cyprus Women's National Team, for advocacy for equality in Cypriot football
- FIFPRO Hero: Aidana Otorbaeva, for organising volunteers to help in hospitals during the COVID-19 pandemic

In 2022, FIFPRO introduced the Union Impact Award, to recognise outstanding work done by unions on the ground to support players.

== See also ==
- The Best FIFA Football Awards
- UEFA Team of the Year
