= Boebie Solomons =

South African footballer

Personal information
- Full name: Abubakaar Solomons
- Date of birth: 22 March 1955 (age 71)
- Place of birth: Cape Town, South Africa
- Position: Midfielder

Senior career*
Years	Team	Apps	(Gls)
- Glendene
- Cape Town Spurs

Managerial career
- 1998: South Africa U20
- 2002: Santos (caretaker)
- 2003–2004: Santos
- 2004–2005: Maritzburg United
- 2005–2007: Bidvest Wits
- 2007–2008: Black Leopards
- 2008: Winners Park
- 2009–2011: Santos
- 2013–2014: Polokwane City
- 2025–: Camps Bay
- * Club domestic league appearances and goals

Abubakaar "Boebie" Solomons (born 22 March 1955) is a South African soccer coach who last coached Premier Soccer League club Polokwane City. He is one of the few footballing coaches in the country to have won winners medals for both the PSL league title (as assistant to Gordon Igesund at Santos) and the Mvela Golden League (as head coach with Bidvest Wits). He has also coached South Africa at under-20 level.

== Playing career ==
Solomons played as a midfielder for Glendene and Cape Town Spurs during his playing career. He was known by the nickname "Asem" (the Afrikaans word for "breath") due to his impressive stamina and work rate.

== Coaching career ==
Solomons moved into coaching shortly after retiring from playing, and joined the coaching staff at Santos for the first time in the late 1980s. In 1998, he was appointed head coach of the South Africa under-20 team. He then joined Santos in 1999, where he initially worked as a youth coach, before becoming involved with the coaching of the senior team in 2000. He was appointed as the club's caretaker-coach on several occasions, including a spell in 2002 where the club won the BP Top Eight Cup, before being appointed as permanent head coach in 2003 following the resignation of Muhsin Ertugral. He went on to lead the team to the final of the ABSA Cup, where Santos defeated Ajax Cape Town 2–0. In October 2004, he was sacked due to the team's poor performances in the CAF Confederation Cup.

Solomons had a short stint with Maritzburg United before being appointed as coach at Bidvest Wits, who had recently been relegated to the Mvela Golden League, at the start of the 2005–06 season. Solomons guided the team to promotion back to the top flight during his first season in charge, but was sacked in March 2007 due to a poor run of results. After brief spells at Black Leopards and Winners Park, he returned to Santos as the club's Director of Football in November 2008. He was once again appointed as head coach of Santos in July 2009. Solomons left the club in December 2011 after a poor run of results.

He joined Bloemfontein Celtic in June 2012 as an assistant coach to Clinton Larsen before being appointed as head coach of Polokwane City in October 2013. Solomons was fired on 1 September 2014 after string of poor results in the 2014–15 Premier Soccer League campaign.

Solomons got appointed head coach at Cape Town All Stars in September 2014, replacing Dylan Deane. Boebie resigned at Cape Town All Stars ahead of the 2015/2016 National First Division season and was appointed head coach at Milano United. Milano United and Boebie Solomons parted ways in April 2017 and Solomons was appointed Technical Director at FC Cape Town

Solomons was appointed as technical director of Camps Bay F.C. since the end of 2025.

== Coaching career highlights ==
- 2005/2006 — won Mvela Golden League Championship and promotion to the Premier Soccer League with Bidvest Wits as head coach
- 1998 — appointed as head coach of South African U20's national squad
- 1996 — won National Soccer League championship in second division with Milano FC
- 1995/2005 — executive member of SAFA Western Province
- 1995/1996 — as assistant coach, toured with SA U20's national team to Lesotho, Germany and Italy

== Honours ==
2003 Absa Cup winners
2002 BP Top 8 winners
2002 Premier Soccer League champions (as Santos FC Assistant Coach)
2001 Bob Save Super Bowl winners (as Santos FC Assistant Coach)
