= Highlands Park F.C. =

- Full name: Highlands Park Football Club
- Nickname: The Lions of the North
- Founded: June 2003; 23 years ago
- Ground: Modderfontein Sports Club
- Capacity: N/A
- Owner(s): Larry Brookstone, Brad Kaftel, Hadley Lasarow
- Chairman: Larry Brookstone
- Coach: Owen Da Gama
- League: SAFA Second Division Gauteng Stream
- 2024–25: 1st(Relegated)
Home colours

Highlands Park Football Club are a South African professional soccer club who played in Modderfontein, Johannesburg. They were founded in 2003 as a phoenix club to the earlier Highlands Park F.C. (1959) and Highlands Park F.C. (1990) The club started out in the fourth tier of the South African Football league, known as SAFA Regional League, and got promoted in 2007 to compete in the third tier, known as Vodacom League.

== History ==
The original Highlands Park were founded in 1959 and had been champions of the National Football League on eight occasions. The club were sold to Jomo Sono in 1983, who renamed the club to Jomo Cosmos. A phoenix club existed between 1990 and 1992.

Larry Brookstone became the new owner of the Highlands Park amateur and junior club in 1996. When he subsequently in 2000 also opted to purchase a 50% ownership of the football club Silver Stars, he decided together with the other owner of Silver Stars, to create a collaboration between the two clubs. This meant that the professional Silver Stars top club was renamed "HP Silver Stars", while the Highlands Park junior team for a couple of years worked as the nursery team for the club. As HP Silver Stars played their matches at the Peter Mokaba Stadium in Polokwane, 309 km northeast of Highlands North, it was however soon decided also to create a Silver Stars junior team in Polokwane. The collaboration between the two clubs now slowly ceased to exist, and after a few years "HP Silver Stars" decided to shorten their name to just "Silver Stars". Larry Brookstone however continued to work as the managing director of Silver Stars until May 2007, when he sold his majority of shares to Royal Bafokeng Nation, who moved the playing ground from Peter Mokaba Stadium in Polokwane to Royal Bafokeng Stadium in Phokeng, and also renamed the club to Platinum Stars.

After the short-term affiliation with Silver Stars, the Highlands Park amateur club had also continued to develop on its own. In 2003 the club had managed to create a second semi-professional Phoenix Club with the name Highlands Park FC. During the first four seasons, the reborn "Highlands Park FC" competed in the fourth tier of the South African football league, known as SAFA Regional League. The club gained promotion in May 2007 to Vodacom League, and Larry Brookstone at the same time made the decision to dedicate all his energy and further investments to Highlands Park FC, where he worked as CEO. The new long term official goal for the club was accordingly set, to become a re-established club in the top flight Premiership.

In the next three seasons, in the Gauteng division in Vodacom League, Highlands Park FC competed consistently at the top level, with a 3rd place, 8th place, and 6th place finish. In the subsequent 2010–11 season, the club managed to win the Gauteng division and qualified to the playoff stage, held in May 2011, between the nine divisional winners divided into two round robin groups. The team was promoted to the National First Division in 2014 after winning the ABC Motsepe League Group B Play-offs by beating Natal United 2–0.

In September 2020, Highlands Park F.C. sold its Premiership status (franchise) to TS Galaxy F.C. who took their place in the 2020–21 South African Premiership season.

Highlands Park has since been playing in the Gauteng Stream of the SAFA Second Division.

In the 2024–25 season, Highlands Park finished top of the log. However, the club was deducted three points for fielding Nigerian player Chigamezu Franklin Ogbonna, who used fraudulent study and work visas in South Africa while playing for Highlands Park, and as of May 2025, is at risk of further penalties. In June 2025, SAFA ruled that the club were to be docked points for each game that Ogbonna played, leading to a 62 point deduction. Highlands Park therefore finished bottom of the log, and were relegated to the SAFA Ekurhuleni Regional League.

== Stadium ==
The new phoenix club moved to play their matches at Gemmel Park, at Gemmelstreet in Linksfield, about 4 km south of the previous Balfour Park Stadium, because the previous stadium was rebuilt as today's Balfour Park Shopping Mall. Because of the rebuild, the memorial gates from Balfour Park was given away to the Jewish Guild club in Rivonia, 12 km north of the old Balfour Park Stadium. Even though the Balfour Park Stadium no longer exists, there are still two training pitches next to the mall, where the junior clubs "Maccabi Team" and "Balfour Alexandra F.C.", also known as "Balfour Park F.C.", were located. However these junior clubs were not associated with the Highlands Park F.C. phoenix club.

When Highlands Park FC won promotion to the Vodacom League in 2007, the professional side of the club moved their training and home venue, 10 km northeast of Gemmel Park, to the Modderfontein Sports Club. This bigger facility was used until 2009, and was also used as the training ground of the Platinum Stars football club, in which the owner of Highlands Park, Larry Brookstone, continued to hold some personal shares until November 2008. But apart from sharing the training facility for a couple of years, there was no revival of the collaboration between the two clubs, which had taken place in 2000–2003. Subsequently, they played their home matches at Balfour Park Stadium, Highlands North.
