= Platinum Stars F.C. =

Platinum Stars
- Full name: Platinum Stars Football Club
- Nicknames: Dikwena (Crocodiles), Dinaledi (Stars)
- Founded: 1998; 27 years ago, purchased Khakhu Fast XI's; Second Division franchise
- Dissolved: 2018
- Ground: Royal Bafokeng Stadium, Phokeng, Rustenburg
- Capacity: 44,530

Former club crest

Platinum Stars was a South African football club based in Phokeng near Rustenburg, North West Province that played in the Premier Soccer League. The club was nicknamed Dikwena, the Tswana name for Crocodiles.

The team's best finish in the Premiership came during the 2006–07 season, when the club finished as league runners-up, earning them their only appearance in the CAF Champions League. During the same season, the Platinum Stars also collected their first major trophy, when the club won the Telkom Knockout in December 2006.

The club was purchased by a consortium in 2018. After initially indicating that the club would remain in place under the same name, it was dissolved in 2018 and a new club established in Cape Town, Cape Umoya United.

== History ==
The club was the historical descendant of Khakhu Fast XI, that initially were founded as an amateur club in 1937, and represented the local city Khakhu – located 170 km northeast of Polokwane. Ahead of the 1998–99 season, the club owner Joseph Mapfulagasha, relocated the team approximately 30 km south to the city Mapate, and at the same time changed the name of the club to Mapate Silver Stars. Along with the new official name, a trend also developed to nickname the team as Tycoon Silver Stars, as the new owner Joseph Mapfulagasha was commonly known by the nickname "Tycoon". In the first season of Mapate Silver Stars, the club straight away won promotion from Vodacom League, to play the subsequent season in the second tier of professional football in South Africa, known as the National First Division.

Starting from the 2000–01 season and a few years ahead, the club became shortly affiliated with the reborn phoenix club Highlands Park, which were founded on the remains of the well-known and successful original Highlands Park, that played at the top flight level of South African football from November 1959 to February 1983, at Balfour Park Stadium in the northern Johannesburg suburb Highlands North. The historical fan base of Highlands Park, were located in the surrounding affluent (and highly Jewish) northern Johannesburg neighbourhoods, such as Houghton, Saxonwold, Sydenham, Glenhazel, Highlands North, Rosebank, Killarney, Linksfield and Cyrildene. In 1996 the longtime fan and businessman Larry Brookstone, purchased Highlands Park out of a previous bankruptcy, and re-established them as an amateur club. When he in 2000 also opted to purchase 50% of the shares in Mapate Silver Stars, and became the managing director of the club, he decided to start a collaboration between both of his two clubs, where the Highlands Park juniors -located at Highlands North, initially became the nursery team of Silver Stars, that played all their professional home matches 309 km northeast of Highlands North, at the big Peter Mokaba Stadium in Polokwane. In order to reflect this unique collaboration, the name of the professional club also changed ahead of the 2000–01 season, to HP Silver Stars.

=== Premiership ===
After playing four seasons in the National First Division, the club finally won promotion to play the 2003–04 season in the top flight Premiership. The clubs first Premiership season ended with a respectable 11th place, and they further improved in the following two seasons, with a 7th place and 5th place. Ahead of the next 2006–07 season, the Royal Bafokeng Nation signed a sponsorship deal with Silver Stars, where the club in return agreed to move its home venue from Polokwane to the Royal Bafokeng Sports Palace near Rustenburg in the North West Province. Silver Stars immediately repaid their new sponsors, by achieving their first set of top flight medals in the club's history, when they beat Ajax Cape Town 3–1 in the final of the inaugural Telkom Knockout league cup, in December 2006. By the end of the 2006–07 season, the club also won silver medals in the Premiership. After this great season of the club, the investment vehicle of the Royal Bafokeng Nation (RBN), Royal Bafokeng Holding, decided to buy 51% of the shares in May 2007, and along the way also opted to change the name of the club to Platinum Stars.

The reason behind the introduction of a new name for the club, was in order to better reflect the historic association of both the North West province and the RBN, with platinum mining in South Africa being their major business activity. With the arrival of RBN as the new owners, the longtime managing director Larry Brookstone and the successful team coach Owen Da Gama, at the same time opted to stop working for the club in May 2007. Larry Brookstone moved on to work as the CEO of the reborn Highlands Park, and Owen Da Gama continued for the next three seasons as a team coach for other top flight clubs in the Premier Soccer League.

In 2008, Platinum Stars became the first South African side to beat the Egyptian club Al Ahly, when they won a first leg clash 2–1, at the third round of the African Champions League. The result however only provided some short-lived success, as Platinum Stars lost the second leg 0–2, and was kicked out of the tournament by Al Ahly, due to a better aggregate score. Meanwhile, the results of the club had also started to falter in the Premiership, where the club only achieved a 10th place in the 2007–08 season. And the next two seasons brought no further improvement, with only a 13th place in 2008–09 and a 14th place in 2009–10. Despite having experienced this hard time with several years of faltering results, the financial support by the Royal Bafokeng Nation was fully maintained, with RBN even opting in November 2008, to buy the remaining 49% of the club shares held by Brookstone and Mapfulagasha. During the 2009–10 season, the club also moved their daily training ground and administrative headquarters with backroom staff, from the previous location at the Modderfontein Sports Club in Johannesburg, to the new Bafokeng Sports Campus in Rustenburg. This new building complex was modernized and improved ahead of the 2010 FIFA World Cup, with the facilities being used by England during the tournament. At that point of time, Platinum Stars also hosted and lost a 3–0 friendly game to the England national football team, being the latter's final warm-up match, ahead of their World Cup opener at 7 June 2010.

As the ambitions of Platinum Stars were higher than the achieved results in the last three seasons, the club decided to re-employ their former top coach Owen Da Gama, for the current 2010–11 season.

In January 2013, Platinum Stars hosted the Algeria national team in a friendly match as part of the latter's preparation for the 2013 Africa Cup of Nations. Algeria won the match 4–1 with Joshua Sauls scoring the lone goal for Platinum Stars from the penalty spot.

In the 2013–14 season, Stars won the 2013 MTN 8 and the Telkom Knockout, beating Orlando Pirates in both finals. The TKO final was won in spectacular fashion with Mogakolodi Ngele who came in after the 75th minute and scored a brace in the last 12 minutes to win 2–1 after leading 1–0 from the first half.

In July 2014, Stars announced that their new technical sponsor replacing Umbro will be Acelli until 2017. The sponsor also gave the club R3 million.

== Honours ==
- Telkom Knockout
  - Winners (2): 2006, 2013
- MTN 8
  - Winners (1): 2013
- Second Division Northern Stream: 1998–99
- First Division Inland Stream: 2002–03

== Club records ==
- Most starts: (South Africa) Stanley Kgatla 229
- Most goals: (Namibia) Henrico Botes 28
- Most capped player: (Eswatini) Manqoba Kunene
- Most starts in a season: (South Africa) Siyabonga Mpontshane 40 (2013–14)

previous record (Edward Williams 34 (2003–04)

- Most goals in a season: Simba Marumo 13 (2006–07) & Bradley Grobler 13 (2010–11)
- Record victory: 5–0 vs Dolphins FC (7 March 2012, Nedbank Cup)
- Record defeat: 0–6 vs Golden Arrows (18 March 2009, PSL)

== League record ==
=== Premiership ===
- 2003–04 – 11th
- 2004–05 – 7th
- 2005–06 – 5th
- 2006–07 – 2nd
- 2007–08 – 10th
- 2008–09 – 13th
- 2009–10 – 14th
- 2010–11 – 10th
- 2011–12 – 10th
- 2012–13 – 2nd
- 2013–14 – 8th
- 2014–15 – 11th
- 2015–16 – 3rd
- 2016–17 – 9th
- 2017–18 – 15th (relegated via playoffs and franchise sold)

== Notable former managers ==
- (South Africa) Owen Da Gama (1 July 2000 – 25 September 2007)
- (South Africa) Thierry Mulonzo (interim) (26 September 2007 – 12 December 2007)
- (Argentina) Miguel Gamondi (13 Dec 2007 – 26 May 2009)
- (South Africa) Steve Komphela (1 July 2009 – 30 June 2010)
- (South Africa) Owen Da Gama (1 Aug 2010 – 9 March 2012)
- (South Africa) Cavin Johnson (interim) (9 March 2012 – 30 June 2012)
- (South Africa) Allan Freese (interim) (9 March 2012 – 30 June 2012)
- (South Africa) Cavin Johnson (1 July 2012 – 19 June 2013)
- (South Africa) Allan Freese (29 July 2013 – 2015)
- (South Africa) Cavin Johnson (31 March 2015 – 5 June 2017)
