= Jean Munganga =

Congolese footballer

Personal information
- Full name: Jean Djunga Munganga
- Date of birth: 5 June 1990 (age 36)
- Place of birth: Kinshasa, Zaïre
- Positions: Defender; defensive midfielder

Team information
- Current team: Black Leopards

Senior career*
Years	Team	Apps	(Gls)
2010–2012	FC Saint-Éloi Lupopo		
2012–2019	Black Leopards	166	(3)
2019–	Tshakhuma Tsha Madzivhandila	5	(1)

International career
2011	DR Congo	1	(0)
- * Club domestic league appearances and goals

Jean Djunga Munganga (born 5 June 1990) is a Congolese footballer who plays for Tshakhuma Tsha Madzivhandila as a defender. He was released by Black Leopards in 2019 and subsequently joined Tshakhuma Tsha Madzivhandila.
