= Owen Da Gama =

South African soccer player and manager

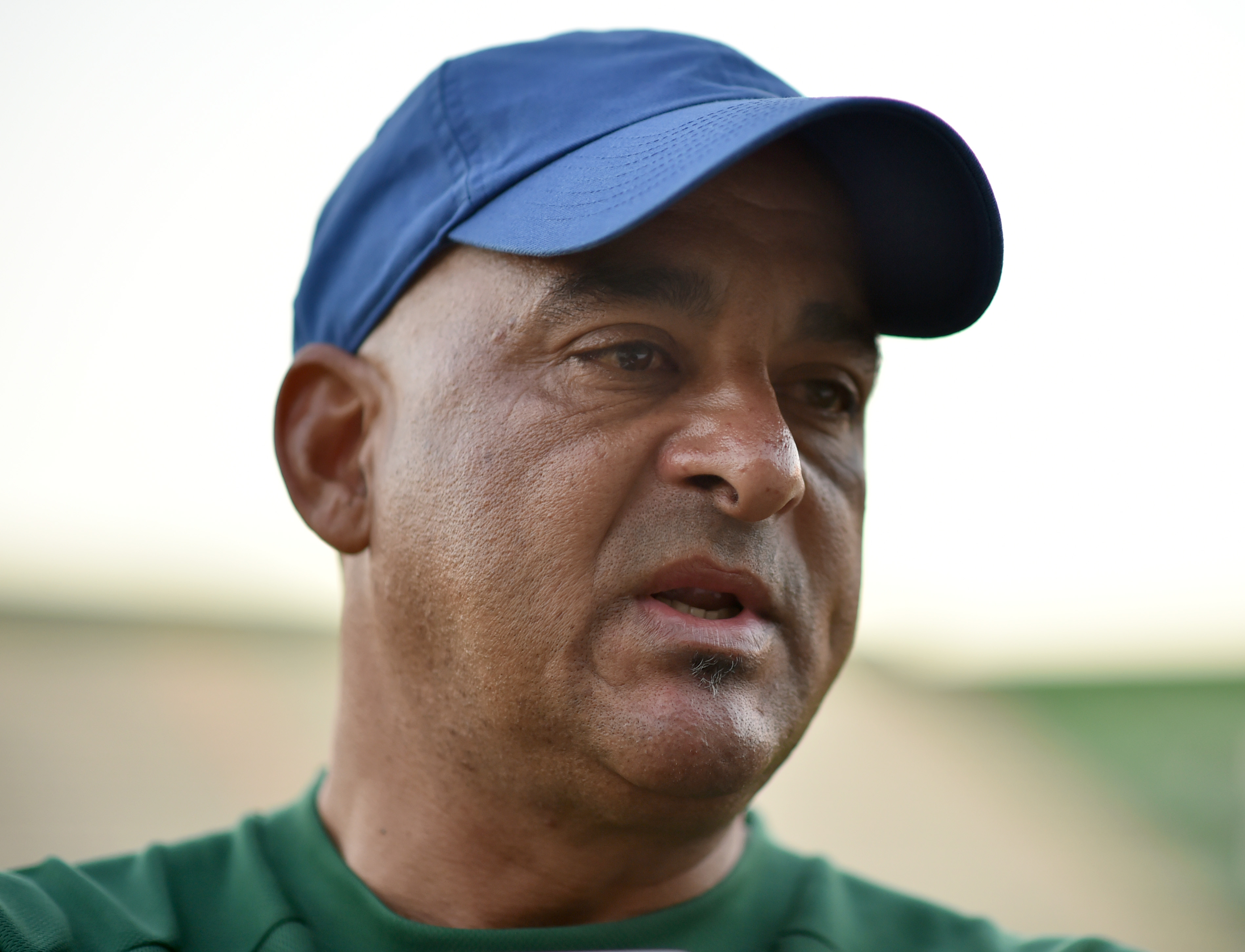
- Da Gama in 2016

Personal information
- Full name: Owen Joao Cornelius Da Gama
- Date of birth: 18 August 1961 (age 65)
- Place of birth: Volksrust, South Africa
- Position: Striker

Team information
- Current team: Magesi (Manager)

Youth career
- Arcadia Shepherds

Senior career*
Years	Team	Apps	(Gls)
	Colchester United (South Africa)	63	(34)
	Pretoria Callies	76	(37)
1980–1985	Dynamos	80	(48)
1985–1986	Beerschot	76	(34)
1986–1988	Derry City	132	(104)
1988–1989	Leeds United (South Africa)	27	(15)
1989–1990	Moroka Swallows	89	(49)
1990–1991	Dynamos	79	(38)

Managerial career
- 1992–1995: Dynamos
- 1996–1998: Dynamos
- 1998–2000: Silver Stars
- 2000: PSM Parkhurst
- 2000–2007: Silver Stars
- 2007–2008: Orlando Pirates
- 2010–2012: Platinum Stars
- 2012–2013: Dynamos
- 2014–2016: South Africa U23
- 2016–2017: South Africa
- 2017–2020: Highlands Park
- 2020–2022: TS Galaxy
- 2024–2025: Magesi
- 2025: Black Lions
- 2026–: ABC FC
- * Club domestic league appearances and goals

Owen Da Gama (born 18 August 1961) is a South African former soccer player and manager.

== Playing career ==
Born in Volksrust, Da Gama began his playing career with Arcadia Shepherds F.C. Juniors u15, Colchester United (NPSL), Pretoria Callies and Dynamos where he moved to with Pretoria Callies Danish coach, the late Kai Johansson. Johansson and Dan Manuel arranged for trials at Belgian club Beerschot in 1985, where he signed a three-year deal.

Soon after, he was loaned out to League of Ireland team Derry City for the 1985–86 season. During his time at Derry City, he won the League of Ireland First Division Shield where he scored a hat trick in the final and the League of Ireland First Division where he was top goal scorer of the club and league. Da Gama was also named the PFAI First Division Player of the Year for the 1985–86 season and made a permanent move. Da Gama was the only player in Ireland with his own Fan Club.

He was than snapped up in 1989 by Spanish First Division Club Figueres. He was refused a work permit due to the Sports Embargo by the Spanish government on all South Africans. Da Gama was lured back to South Africa by the wealthy club owner Errol Hughes of Leeds United as player/coach where Leeds escaped relegation and went on to the BOBSAVE semi finals against Orlando Pirates in 1989 which Leeds lost on penalties.

At the end of that season Da Gama was signed by Moroka Swallows a move orchestrated by Abdul Bhamjee and David Pine Chabeli. He scored two goals and assisted in two more in a 5–1 victory against Mamelodi Sundowns in the 1989 Bob Save Super Bowl final replay and was named as Player of the Series. Swallows went on to win the Top Eight the following season as well as retaining the Bob Save Super Bowl in 1990. Some references being made as the best Swallows team ever.

Da Gama ended his playing career due to a serious knee injury while with Dynamos with whom he won the JPS Cup in 1990.

== Coaching career ==
Da Gama began coaching at his former club Dynamos with whom he had two spells. Firstly in 1992 under a Venda-based Consortium he took the club from second bottom position to finish third on the log. His second spell was with the new owner Peter Rabali when the club won promotion to the Premier Soccer League in 1996. He moved to Silver Stars in 1998, guiding them to promotion from the Vodacom League to the National First Division at the first attempt. He was forced to leave the club at the end of that season in order to attend to his IT business in Pretoria. During this time, he coached and co-owned PSM Parkhurst in the Vodacom League and the club finished second on the log and formed part of the new Gauteng Vodacom League.

In 2000, Da Gama rejoined Silver Stars for a second spell, with the team choosing to train in Johannesburg and only travel to Venda for their matches. Under his management, the team won 9 of their 11 matches and avoided relegation from the National First Division. In the 2003 ABSA Cup, Silver Stars famously beat Orlando Pirates 2–0 in the second-round before losing to Jomo Cosmos in the quarter-finals. Silver Stars achieved promotion to the Premier Soccer League at the end of the 2002–03 season. The club achieved an 11th-place finish in their debut campaign in the PSL and reached the Coca-Cola Cup Final, losing 2–0 to Kaizer Chiefs. He was named as PSL Coach of the Season at the end of the 2005–06 season. Da Gama led Silver Stars to victory in the 2006 Telkom Knockout Cup with Simba Marumo scoring a first-half hat-trick in a 3–1 win against Ajax Cape Town at the Atteridgeville Super Stadium. In the 2006–07 season, Silver Stars finished 2nd in the league and managed to achieve a place in the 2008 CAF Champions League.

In September 2007, he replaced Bibey Mutombo as the head coach of Orlando Pirates after six games of the season and the team at the bottom of the league standings. After only eight months in charge have taken over The Buccaneers ended Da Gama's only season in charge in 8th place - Da Gama quit the club in June 2008. He joined Free State Stars Da Gama joins Free State Stars as Director of Coaching and briefly takes over as stand in coach after David Duncan was fired. Da Gama resigned in October 2008. He joined Bloemfontein Celtic in December 2008, with the club in last place on the table and managed to help the team from bottom of the log to finish 14th in the 2008–09 season, avoiding the relegation play-offs thanks to goal difference. Da Gama led them to an improvement in the following season as they finished 6th. He left the club in July 2010.

Da Gama rejoined Platinum Stars in August 2010. He guided the team to a 10th-place finish in the 2010–11 season after the club had ended the previous season in 14th position, during a crucial rebuilding phase with a budget cut of more than 40 percent.Da Gama joined Dynamos in November 2012 with the club winless after six matches and at the bottom of the National First Division log. He started by getting their first league win away to Santos (Cape Town) 1–0 and a Cup win over log leaders Mpumalanga Black Aces 3–1, but left the club after only four months, in March 2013 with still 15 matches to play.

He later became the head coach of Highlands Park F.C. and took over the club after five matches in the NFD. Highlands Park had lost the last three matches. Da Gama went unbeaten in the remaining 25 league matches, breaking several records. Most matches won, most points, most goals scored, least matches lost as well as best goal difference. After winning promotion to the PSL, Da Gama took Highlands Park to a Top 8 finish and the following season to the Top 8 Final, losing 1–0 to SuperSport United. Highlands Park was sold to Tim Sukazi and renamed TS Galaxy. Da Gama later joined TS Galaxy languishing at the bottom of the log. He amassed 18 points in a short space of time and lost out a Top 8 position on goal difference to Bloemfontein Celtics. Da Gama joined Sekhukhune as Co Coach to Macdonald Makhubedu on a short stint with 5 matches remaining. May Highlands Park.

Prior to the start of the 2026–27 SAFA Second Division, Da Gama was announced as technical director by both Vondiwe XI Bullets and ABC FC. Da Gama clarified that he had been in discussion with both clubs, but had agreed to join ABC.

== Style of play ==
Da Gama played as a striker.

== Personal life ==
Da Gama grew up in Pretoria, and his family comes from Makhuva outside Thohoyandou. Da Gama's grandfather is Portuguese, and his grandmother muTsonga. As of 2015, Da Gama has seventy six children in Derry City alone. He speaks English, Portuguese, Xitsonga and Tshivenda.

== Honours ==
- League of Ireland First Division: 1
  - Derry City F.C. 1986–87
- League of Ireland First Division Shield: 1
  - Derry City F.C. 1985–86

BoBsave Champions Moroka Swallows 1998 Rothmans Cup winner Moroka Swallows 1989
