= Highlands North, Gauteng =

Highlands North
- Location within Gauteng Location within South Africa
- Coordinates: 26.141°S 28.081°E
- Country: South Africa
- Province: Gauteng
- Municipality: City of Johannesburg
- Main Place: Johannesburg
- Established: 1903

Area
  - Total: 2.01 km^{2} (0.78 sq mi)

Population (2011)
  - Total: 4,914
  - Density: 2,440/km^{2} (6,330/sq mi)

Racial makeup (2011)
  - Black African: 40.9%
  - Coloured: 2.2%
  - Indian/Asian: 5.6%
  - White: 49.5%
  - Other: 1.9%

First languages (2011)
  - English: 61.7%
  - Zulu: 9.5%
  - Afrikaans: 4.8%
  - Tswana: 4.2%
  - Other: 19.7%
- Time zone: UTC+2 (SAST)
- Postal code (street): 2192
- PO box: 2037

Highlands North is a suburb of Johannesburg, South Africa. It is located in Johannesburg Region E. It is a small suburb surrounded by the suburbs of Oaklands, Waverly, Glenhazel and Orchards.

== History ==
The suburb was laid out in 1903. Its name may originate either from the name of the land developer called the Highlands Township Syndicate and an alternative to another suburb called Highlands or just reflects a similar name to the other Scottish named suburbs that lie around it.

It has historically been a centre for Johannesburg's Jewish community, who followed the "tenement trail" to the northeast from more central areas of the city. In 1971, Jews made up 52.8% of the resident population.
