= Steve Komphela =

South African soccer player and manager

Personal information
- Full name: Steven Mbuyi Komphela
- Date of birth: 1 July 1967 (age 59)
- Place of birth: Kroonstad, South Africa
- Position: Defender

Senior career*
Years	Team	Apps	(Gls)
1985–1989	Klerksdorp City	80	(4)
1989–1993	Free State Stars	136	(14)
1993	Kaizer Chiefs	34	(5)
1993–1996	Gaziantepspor	86	(2)
1996–1997	Çanakkale Dardanelspor	17	(0)
Total		353	(25)

International career
1992–1995	South Africa	24	(0)

Managerial career
- 2002–2003: Manning Rangers
- 2003–2004: Dynamos
- 2004: South Africa U-20
- 2006–2007: Maritzburg United
- 2005–2008: South Africa U-23
- 2008–2009: Free State Stars
- 2009–2010: Platinum Stars
- 2010–2013: Free State Stars
- 2012: South Africa (caretaker)
- 2014–2015: Maritzburg United
- 2015–2018: Kaizer Chiefs
- 2018–2019: Bloemfontein Celtic
- 2019–2020: Golden Arrows
- 2020–2023: Mamelodi Sundowns
- 2023–2024: Swallows
- 2024–2024: Golden Arrows
- 2024–: Mamelodi Sundowns (Assistant)
- * Club domestic league appearances and goals

Steve Komphela (born 1 July 1967) is a South African football coach and a former player who is the assistant manager of South African Premier Soccer League club Mamelodi Sundowns F.C.

== Early life ==
Steve was born in Golden Valley farm, 20 km outside Kroonstad to Jack Koyi Koyo and Nomalanga Komphela as the youngest of 11 children. Politician Butana Komphela is his brother. Komphela became a teacher by profession after he got his teacher's diploma at Tshiya College in Free State.

== Club career ==
Komphela started out at NSL Second Division side Klerksdorp City and later Qwa Qwa Stars where he earned promotion to the National Soccer League. He made his NSL debut on 9 February 1986 in a 4–1 win over Witbank Aces. In 1992, Komphela helped his team to a third-place finish in the league and was voted the NSL Players' Player of the Year. He later joined Kaizer Chiefs where he played all 34 league games and signed a contract overseas on 16 August 1993 moving to Gaziantepspor for the second half of 1993/94 season alongside fellow South African Teboho Moloi. He retired in 1997.

== Outside football ==
Komphela is married to Mamoepi Komphela, and together they have three kids: Nombuyiselo, Nomalanga, and Noxolo. He taught at the Johannesburg Secondary School but apart from being a life orientation teacher and a professional footballer, Komphela was also a TV presenter. He hosted his own talk show on Çanakkale Dardanelspor's television channel. Komphela was approached by SABC to be the host of a football talk show but rejected this opportunity. Steve also tutors the Mamelodi Sundowns youth team. He said the youth need brains to play football because "without brains a footballer is just a headless chicken chasing a ball". He also takes part in many youth uplifting programs.

== International career ==
Komphela is a founder member of the new national team of South Africa. He made his debut on 7 July 1992 in a 1–0 win over Cameroon. On 24 October 1992 against Congo, his 7th cap, he captained the team in its second World Cup qualifier. He played every minute of the first 22 internationals. He captained the team for the 18th and last time in a 2–2 draw against Zambia on 22 November 1995 which was his 24th cap. Having played almost half of the team's internationals up to December 1995. He was not selected for the 1996 African Cup of Nations for obvious reasons.

== Coaching career ==
Komphela began his coaching career with Manning Rangers F.C. in 2002. Between 2002 and 2015, he coached several clubs, in which he all worked for a single season.

In 2015, he joined Kaizer Chiefs F.C. on a three-year contract. Kaizer Chiefs won the Macufe Cup in 2016 and 2017, the Carling Black Label Cup in 2016 and 2017, and the Maize Cup in 2017 under Komphela. He resigned as head coach of the club with immediate effect following a 2-0 Nedbank Cup semi-final loss to Free State Stars in April 2018.

In July 2018, he joined Bloemfontein Celtic which was undergoing financial struggles at the time.

Shortly after he started his new career with Bloemfontein Celtic, he started the 2018-19 Premier Soccer League league with a huge surprise. He won the first six consecutive league games and got a 2–2 draw against Kaizer Chiefs, after which his team was down to 2–0 at one point later in the second-half. He also beat Orlando Pirates in that first leg of the season. He managed Golden Arrows but resigned a day before he was announced as the new Mamelodi Sundowns coach. He was announced to coach Mamelodi Sundowns on the club's Twitter on Monday 12 October 2020.
