= Cavin Johnson =

South African soccer coach (born 1958)

Personal information
- Full name: Cavin Dennis Johnson
- Date of birth: 11 November 1958 (age 67)
- Place of birth: Johannesburg, South Africa

Managerial career
- Years: Team
- 2012–2013: Platinum Stars
- 2013–2014: SuperSport United
- 2015–2017: Platinum Stars
- 2017–2019: AmaZulu
- 2019–2020: Black Leopards
- 2023–2024: Kaizer Chiefs

Cavin Dennis Johnson (born 11 November 1958) is a South African soccer coach who most recently worked as an interim coach at Kaizer Chiefs in the DStv Premiership.

Johnson has previously managed South African clubs Platinum Stars (twice), SuperSport United, AmaZulu and Black Leopards in the Premier Soccer League.

== Coaching career ==
Johnson is one of many coaches that came under the tutelage of Ted Dumitru. Before accepting the head coaching role at Platinum Stars in 2012, Johnson mainly worked as youth and assistant coach for various clubs in South Africa among them assistant coach and later head of youth development at Ajax Cape Town, Mamelodi Sundowns and most recently Platinum Stars. In his first season as head coach he led Stars to a 2nd-place finish in the PSL and subsequently joined SuperSport United to replace the outgoing Gavin Hunt. Johnson managed SuperSport between 2013 and 2014 for 39 matches, achieving 1.36 points per game.

After being sacked by SuperSport he returned to Platinum Stars in March 2015, guiding the club to third place in the league in the 2015–16 season. After a ninth-placed finish in 2016–17, Johnson left Platinum Stars when the club decided not to renew his contract.

On 8 August 2017, he was appointed as the head coach of newly-promoted AmaZulu in the Premier Soccer League - succeeding Joey Antipas. He was fired by AmaZulu in August 2019, after a poor start to the Club's 2019/20 season, accumulating 2 points from 15 (first 5 games), and not having won a game since April 2019.

Following the resignation of Luc Eymael from Black Leopards on 27 December 2019, Johnson was named as the new Black Leopards mentor on 29 December 2019. On 27 January 2020, after being in charge of Leopards for only 5 matches, Johnson was suspended from his duties as head coach - this due to a string of poor performances (four losses and one draw). On 31 January 2020 it was announced that Johnson had officially parted ways with Black Leopards.

He holds a SAFA Level III Pro Licence, Dutch FA (KNVB) certificate, Brazil FA Advanced Course certificate and his preferred formation is 4-4-2.

In 1994, Johnson discovered Steven Pienaar and later brought him to the School of Excellence where Johnson worked as youth coach at the time. Both hail from Westbury in Johannesburg.

In October 2020, he became an assistant coach to Pitso Mosimane at Egyptian club Al Ahly.

In October 2023, he was appointed interim coach of Kaizer Chiefs He left in July 2024 after leading Chiefs to tenth in the 2023–24 Premiership, their lowest ever finish in the PSL era.

== Personal life ==
Johnson is married, with three children.

Johnson suffered a heart attack on 31 January 2020, spending two nights in hospital under observation.

== Honours ==
=== Club Honours ===
- Premier Soccer League:
  - Runner-up: 2012–13 (with Platinum Stars F.C.)
- The Msunduzi Cup:
  - Winner: 2019 (with AmaZulu F.C.)
- Kwa-Zulu Natal Premiers Cup:
  - Winner: 2018 (with AmaZulu F.C.)

=== Personal Honours ===
- South African Premier Division Coach of the Month: September/October 2015; November/December 2018
