= Betting Control and Licensing Board =

Gaming Commission overview
- Jurisdiction: Kenya
- Headquarters: ACK Garden Annex, 1St Ngong Ave Nairobi, Kenya
- Website: Authority website

Betting Control and Licensing Board (BCLB) governs the authorization of lotteries and prize competition as well as eradication of illegal gambling activities in Kenya. It was established through an Act of Parliament (Chapter 131 Laws of Kenya of 1966). On 1 July 2019, the Betting Control and Licensing Board postponed renewing the licenses of eight sports betting operators, including Sportpesa, MelBet, Betin and Betway which controlled 85% of the total betting market in Kenya.

== History ==
BCLB was established in 1966 under the Betting, Lotteries and Gaming Act (Chapter 131 of the Laws of Kenya). The organization underwent a significant institutional change with the introduction of the Gambling Control Act of 2023, which established the Gambling Regulatory Authority of Kenya as the new regulatory body to replace BCLB's former governance structure. The BCLB is domiciled at the Executive Office of the President following Executive Order No. 1 of 2023. Jane Mwikali Makau serves as Chairperson, and Peter K. Mbugi is the CEO.

In the 2023/24 financial year, taxes from the gambling sector (including excise duty on stakes and withholding tax on winnings) totaled KES 22.3 billion.

In March 2025, the board issued mandatory compliance requirements for aviator and crash games, requiring licensed operators to resubmit detailed documentation about game mechanics, algorithms, and provider certifications within 14 days. Additionally, in May 2025, BCLB introduced strict advertising guidelines that ban celebrity and influencer endorsements, require pre-approval of all advertisements, and prohibit advertising near schools and religious sites.

== Functions ==
BCLB's mandate encompasses regulating and controlling betting, lotteries, and gaming operations throughout Kenya. The board's primary responsibilities include:

- Licensing and regulation of betting, gaming, and lottery operators;
- Consumer protection against fraud and misleading practice;
- Eradication of illegal gambling activities;
- Revenue collection through licensing fees and taxes;
- Supervision and inspection of betting and gaming premises nationwide;
- Promotion of responsible gaming and management of gambling addiction.

The board oversees more than 220 licensed firms operating in the country.
