= South Africa national soccer team =

Men's national soccer team

South Africa
- Nickname: Bafana Bafana
- Association: South African Football Association (SAFA)
- Confederation: CAF (Africa)
- Sub-confederation: COSAFA (Southern Africa)
- Head coach: Pitso Mosimane
- Captain: Ronwen Williams
- Most caps: Aaron Mokoena (106)
- Top scorer: Benni McCarthy (31)
- Home stadium: Various
- FIFA code: RSA
| First colours | Second colours |

FIFA ranking
- Current: 48 (18 November 2026)
- Highest: 16 (August 1996)
- Lowest: 124 (December 1992)

First international
- Argentina 0–1 South Africa (Buenos Aires, Argentina; 9 July 1906)

Biggest win
- Australia 0–8 South Africa (Adelaide, Australia; 17 September 1955)

Biggest defeat
- South Africa 1–9 England (Cape Town, South Africa; 17 July 1920)

World Cup
- Appearances: 4 (first in 1998)
- Best result: Round of 32 (2026)

Africa Cup of Nations
- Appearances: 12 (first in 1996)
- Best result: Champions (1996)

CONCACAF Gold Cup
- Appearances: 1 (first in 2005)
- Best result: Quarter-finals (2005)

African Nations Championship
- Appearances: 3 (first in 2011)
- Best result: Quarter-finals (2011)

Confederations Cup
- Appearances: 2 (first in 1997)
- Best result: Fourth place (2009)
Medal record
Africa Cup of Nations
| Gold medal – first place | 1996 South Africa | Team |
| Silver medal – second place | 1998 Burkina Faso | Team |
| Bronze medal – third place | 2000 Nigeria and Ghana | Team |
| Bronze medal – third place | 2023 Ivory Coast | Team |
Afro-Asian Cup of Nations
| Gold medal – first place | 1997 South Africa and Saudi Arabia | Team |
COSAFA Cup
| Gold medal – first place | 2002 Southern Africa | Team |
| Gold medal – first place | 2007 Southern Africa | Team |
| Gold medal – first place | 2008 South Africa | Team |
| Gold medal – first place | 2016 Namibia | Team |
| Gold medal – first place | 2021 South Africa | Team |
| Silver medal – second place | 2025 South Africa | Team |
| Bronze medal – third place | 2000 Southern Africa | Team |
| Bronze medal – third place | 2005 Mauritius, Namibia, South Africa and Zambia | Team |
| Bronze medal – third place | 2013 Zambia | Team |
| Bronze medal – third place | 2023 South Africa | Team |
- Website: safa.net

The South Africa national soccer team represents South Africa in men's international soccer and is run by the South African Football Association, the governing body for soccer in South Africa. Nicknamed Bafana Bafana, (Note: See nickname.) the team plays at various stadiums around the country. The team, a member of both FIFA and the Confederation of African Football (CAF), is one of the most well-supported national sides in Africa, and are recognised by their traditional green and gold kits.

Having played their first match in 1906, South Africa returned to the world stage in 1992, after sixteen years of being banned from FIFA, and forty years of effective suspension due to the apartheid system. South Africa have qualified for the FIFA World Cup four times: 1998, 2002 and 2026, and qualifying as hosts of the 2010 tournament, becoming the first African nation to do so. Despite defeating France 2–1 in their final game of the group stage, they failed to progress from the first round of the tournament, becoming the first host nation in the history of the FIFA World Cup to exit in the group stage, followed by Qatar in 2022. As of October 2026, the team is ranked 48th in FIFA International Rankings.

South Africa's most significant achievement came in 1996 when they hosted and won the Africa Cup of Nations (AFCON). They reached the final again in 1998 but were defeated by Egypt. Later in 2000, they earned a bronze medal (third place) by defeating Tunisia (2–2 a.e.t, 4–3 on penalties) and in 2023 earned another bronze medal (third place) by defeating the Democratic Republic of the Congo (0–0 a.e.t; 6–5 on penalties).

== History ==
=== Pre-1992 ===
Football first arrived in South Africa through colonialism in the late nineteenth century, as the game was popular among British soldiers. From the earliest days of the sport in South Africa until the end of apartheid, organised soccer was affected by the country's system of racial segregation. The all-white Football Association of South Africa (FASA) was formed in 1892, while the South African Indian Football Association (SAIFA), the South African Bantu Football Association (SABFA) and the South African Coloured Football Association (SACFA) were founded in 1902, 1933 and 1936 respectively.

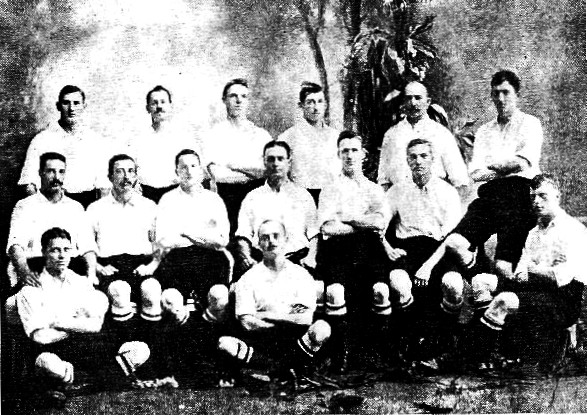
The South African team that toured South America in 1906. They played 12 matches with only one defeat

In 1903 the SAFA re-affiliated with the English Football Association after the Second Boer War between the British Empire and the Boer state. There was a plan to play a tournament held in Argentina, with South Africa and Fulham as guest teams, but it was not carried out. Nevertheless, South Africa traveled to South America in 1906 to play a series of friendly matches there.

South Africa played a total of 12 matches in South America, winning 11 with 60 goals scored and only 7 conceded. Opponents included Belgrano A.C., the Argentina national team, a combined Liga Rosarina, C.A. Estudiantes, and Quilmes A.C. The only team that defeated South Africa was Argentina's Alumni 1–0 at Sociedad Sportiva stadium in Buenos Aires, on 24 June, although the South Africans would take revenge on 22 July, defeating them 2–0. The players were exclusively white, civil servants, bankers, and civil engineers. Seven of the 15 players were born in South Africa and 8 originated from England and Scotland.

South Africa was one of four African nations to attend FIFA's 1953 congress, at which the four demanded, and won, representation on the FIFA executive committee. Thus the four nations (South Africa, Ethiopia, Egypt and Sudan) founded the Confederation of African Football in 1956, and the South African representative, Fred Fell, sat at the first meeting as a founding member. It soon became clear however that South Africa's constitution prohibited racially mixed teams from competitive sport, and so they could only send either an all-black side or an all-white side to the planned 1957 African Cup of Nations. This was unacceptable to the other members of the Confederation, and South Africa was disqualified from the competition, however, some sources say that they withdrew voluntarily.

At the second CAF conference in 1958, South Africa were formally expelled from CAF. The all-white FASA were admitted to FIFA in the same year, but in August 1960 it was given an ultimatum of one year to fall in line with the non-discriminatory regulations of FIFA. On 26 September 1961 at the annual FIFA conference, the South African association was formally suspended from FIFA. Sir Stanley Rous, president of The Football Association of England and a champion of South Africa's FIFA membership, was elected FIFA President a few days later. Rous was adamant that sport, and FIFA in particular, should not embroil itself in political matters and against fierce opposition, he continued to resist attempts to expel South Africa from FIFA. South Africa's FIFA membership was reinstated in 1963 and it was again suspended a year later, before South Africa was ultimately expelled in 1976. A sports boycott of South Africa was imposed by FIFA in 1976 due to the policy of racial segregation of the apartheid state.

In 1991, when the apartheid system was beginning to be demolished, a new multi-racial South African Football Association was formed, and admitted to FIFA – and thus finally allowing South Africa to enter the qualifying stages for subsequent World Cups.

=== 1992–2000 ===
After spending nearly two decades in international isolation, the South African national team played its first game on 7 July 1992, beating Cameroon 1–0 at Kings Park in Durban.

The team entered the 1994 Cup of Nations qualifiers and was placed in Group 5, along with Mauritius, Zambia and Zimbabwe. They won one game, away to Mauritius, and drew with Mauritius and Zimbabwe at home. The team finished third in the group and failed to qualify.

For the 1994 FIFA World Cup qualifiers South Africa was placed in Group D, along with Congo, Libya and Nigeria. Libya withdrew from the qualifiers. South Africa finished second in the group, and failed to qualify for the next stage of qualifying.

In 1996, a mere five years after readmission, South Africa achieved their finest moment when they hosted and won the 1996 African Cup of Nations, in the process of reaching 16th in the FIFA rankings.

The shock firing of AFCON-winning coach Clive Barker did little to slow momentum as they followed their 1996 success with a second-place finish at the 1998 Africa Cup of Nations behind Egypt under Jomo Sono. The team had earned their first appearance at the FIFA World Cup, qualifying for France '98. Under head coach Philippe Troussier, South Africa suffered a 3–0 defeat to hosts France in their World Cup debut, and drew against Denmark and Saudi Arabia 1–1 and 2–2 respectively on their way to an early exit.

=== 2000s ===
Under newly hired coach Trott Moloto, South Africa started the decade off strongly, finishing third in the 2000 Africa Cup of Nations; despite this, another coaching change was made. The Portuguese coach Carlos Queiroz was hired as the man to take South Africa to the 2002 FIFA World Cup. South Africa qualified for the 2002 AFCON and were eliminated in the quarter-finals against hosts Mali. In the run-up to the World Cup, in which South Africa had easily qualified as winners of Group E, Queiroz left his post as head coach reportedly after clashing with Sono, who had been hired as the technical director of the team a month before Quieroz's departure as coach.

Jomo Sono was brought back in a caretaker capacity to lead South Africa in Korea/Japan. Placed in Group B along with Spain, Paraguay and debutants Slovenia, South Africa earned a 2–2 draw against Paraguay in their opening game with a last-gasp penalty from Quinton Fortune and followed that up with their first-ever victory at the finals with a 1–0 win over Slovenia. South Africa headed into their final game against Spain second in the group and three points clear of Paraguay and Slovenia. During the game in which five goals were scored inside the hour, South Africa twice came back from a goal down in an agonising 3–2 defeat to the Spain. In the other game, which kicked off at the same time, Paraguay found themselves beating Slovenia 3–1, with Paraguay's goal difference enough for them to surpass South Africa.

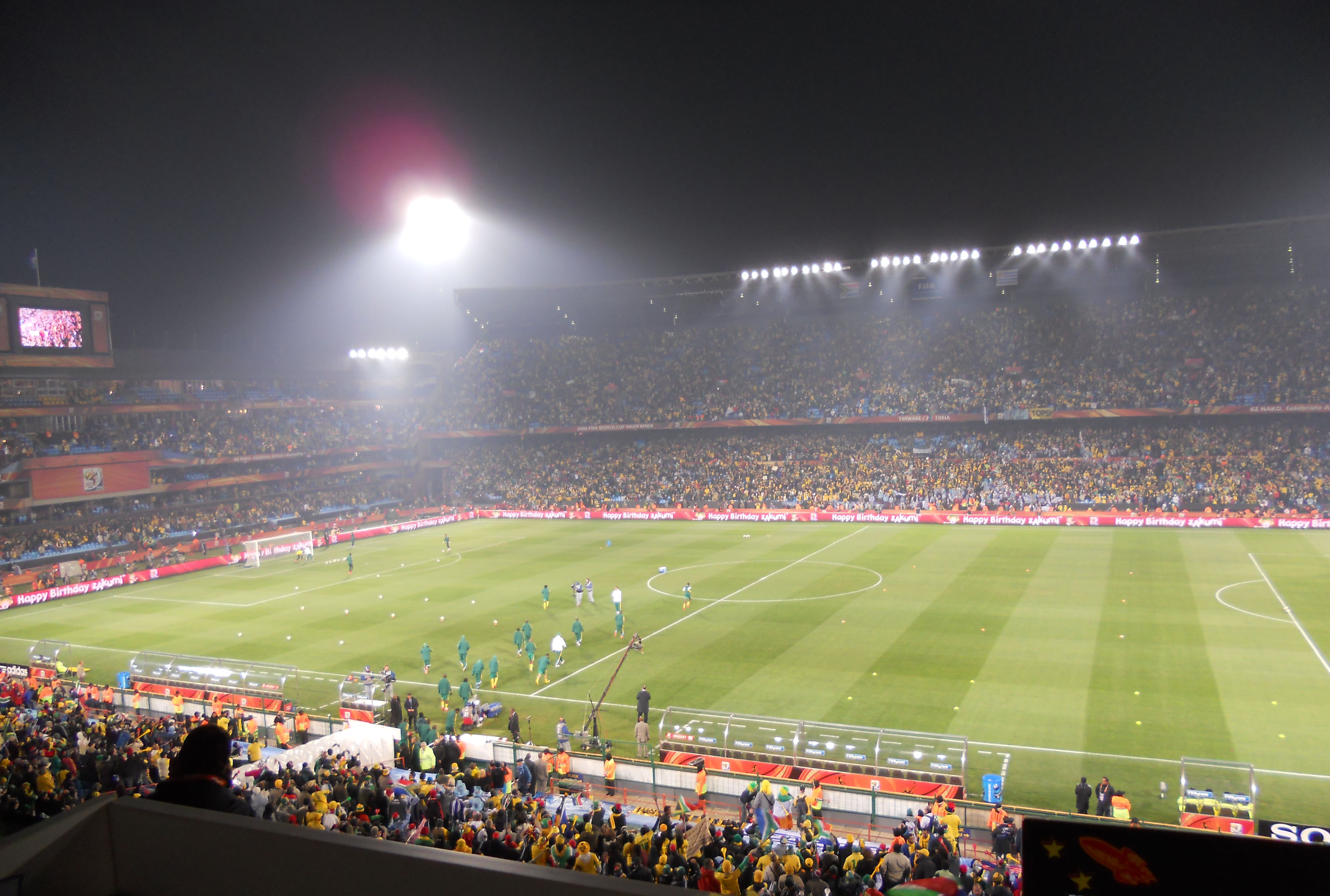
South Africa hosting the 2010 FIFA World Cup against Uruguay

Former World Cup winner and Brazil national team coach Carlos Alberto Parreira was approached for the job, and he accepted. He signed a R100 million contract covering four years. His term as manager started 1 January 2007 targeting the 2010 FIFA World Cup, which South Africa had been awarded the right to host. He resigned as coach in April 2008 due to family reasons. Joel Santana was hand-picked by Parreira to succeed him and he was signed to coach the team until 2010.

The World Cup hosts failed to qualify for the 2010 Africa Cup of Nations, and Parreira was reappointed as head coach after Santana's departure in time for the 2009 FIFA Confederations Cup – also hosted by South Africa. The national team would see an improvement in performance, holding its own against Spain and Brazil, the latter requiring an 88th-minute goal by Dani Alves to overcome South Africa in the semi-finals. South Africa ultimately finished 4th, following a 3–2 loss to Spain in the third-place match.

As World Cup hosts, South Africa was placed in Group A, along with Mexico, Uruguay and 2006 runners-up France. South Africa played the first game, which opened the World Cup 2010 tournament with a 1–1 draw against Mexico after taking the lead through a long-range Siphiwe Tshabalala strike. A heavy 3–0 defeat in the second group game against Uruguay and a Mexican win over France left South Africa with a mountain to climb in order to progress beyond the group stage. Despite defeating France, elimination in the group stage made South Africa become the first host to fail to progress beyond the first round of the World Cup.

South Africa-France starting lineups at the 2010 World Cup

| Pos | Team | Pld | W | D | L | GF | GA | GD | Pts | Qualification |
|---|---|---|---|---|---|---|---|---|---|---|
| 1 | Uruguay | 3 | 2 | 1 | 0 | 4 | 0 | +4 | 7 | Advance to knockout stage |
| 2 | Mexico | 3 | 1 | 1 | 1 | 3 | 2 | +1 | 4 | Advance to knockout stage |
| 3 | South Africa (H) | 3 | 1 | 1 | 1 | 3 | 5 | −2 | 4 | |
| 4 | France | 3 | 0 | 1 | 2 | 1 | 4 | −3 | 1 | |

Source: FIFA
Rules for classification: Tie-breaking criteria
(H) Hosts

Following the conclusion of the World Cup and the expiration of his contract, Carlos Alberto Parreira announced he would step down because his wife Leila was suffering from cancer.

=== 2010s ===
South Africa failed to qualify for the Africa Cup of Nations finals after the rules were misread. They ultimately played for and achieved a draw at home in Nelspruit against Sierra Leone in a game they needed to win, when news about Niger trailing in Egypt was received, leading to the qualification of Niger at their expense, and also at Sierra Leone's. They then celebrated at the end as if they had qualified, making it the second time they would be so embarrassed in 4 years after qualifying as a lucky 3rd and last best runners-up for the 2008 edition, with Zambia catapulting over South Africa as Group winners after a 3–1 win in Cape Town – and thereby gaining an automatic qualifying ticket on the head-to-head record with the South Africans erroneously thinking goal difference would be the primary tie-breaker.

The SABC also announced that the team had qualified and the SAFA president Kirsten Nematandani then congratulated the team on TV before realisation dawned. SAFA said they would appeal to the Confederation of African Football but the appeal was later withdrawn.

South Africa continued to disappoint into 2012, opening the year with a lacklustre 0–0 draw away to 2012 Africa Cup of Nations co-hosts Equatorial Guinea. This would be the start of a run that would see Bafana Bafana rack up 6 successive draws to start the year. The run of draws included 1–1, 0–0 and 1–1 draws at home to Zambia, Ghana, and Senegal respectively in friendlies. Following a 1–1 draw at home to Ethiopia in a 2014 World Cup qualifier, head coach Pitso Mosimane was fired. The draw increased South Africa's streak to 7 games without a win. Mosimane was replaced as head coach by Steve Komphela on an interim basis while SAFA interviewed potential candidates to fill the post on a permanent basis.

In his first game in charge as interim head coach, Komphela oversaw yet another uninspired performance in South Africa's second World Cup qualifier against Botswana as they drew yet again, extending their winless run to 8 games. Bafana Bafana finally tasted victory when they defeated Gabon 3–0 at home in a friendly, ending their winless streak.

Following the crisis in Libya throughout 2011, CAF made the decision to move the 2013 Africa Cup of Nations from Libya – who were the original hosts – to South Africa. Libya was then given the right to host the 2017 edition of the tournament, which was originally awarded to South Africa. The 2013 hosts were seeded and drawn in Group A along with Angola, Morocco and tournament debutants Cape Verde.

South Africa faced Group B runners-up Mali in the quarterfinals, being eliminated from the tournament 3–1 on penalties.

They received a first round bye when the qualifying process for the 2014 FIFA World Cup began on 30 July 2011. For the second round of the qualifying process, South Africa was placed in Pot 1 as a top-seeded nation for the draw from where they were drawn into Group A, along with neighbours Botswana, the Central African Republic and Ethiopia.

On 19 June 2013 it was reported in the South African press that Ethiopia had fielded an ineligible player against South Africa, who would possibly win 3–0 as a result. Despite this, Ethiopia were never punished, and South Africa failed to qualify for the tournament.

| Pos | Team | Pld | W | D | L | GF | GA | GD | Pts | Qualification | Ethiopia national football team | South Africa national soccer team | Botswana national football team | Central African Republic national football team |
|---|---|---|---|---|---|---|---|---|---|---|---|---|---|---|
| 1 | Ethiopia | 6 | 4 | 1 | 1 | 8 | 6 | +2 | 13 | Third round | — | 2–1 | 1–0 | 2–0 |
| 2 | South Africa | 6 | 3 | 2 | 1 | 12 | 5 | +7 | 11 | | 1–1 | — | 4–1 | 2–0 |
| 3 | Botswana | 6 | 2 | 1 | 3 | 8 | 10 | −2 | 7 | | 3–0 (Note: Awarded) | 1–1 | — | 3–2 |
| 4 | Central African Republic | 6 | 1 | 0 | 5 | 5 | 12 | −7 | 3 | | 1–2 | 0–3 | 2–0 | — |

Notes:

South Africa were eliminated in the group stage at the 2015 AFCON and failed to qualify for the tournament two years later. This, in addition to various controversies, disparaging remarks that Mashaba allegedly made about SAFA top officials, his supposedly arrogant nature and his ill-treatment of overseas-based stars, led to his suspension after leading South Africa to a 2–1 victory over Senegal in a 2018 FIFA World Cup qualifier.

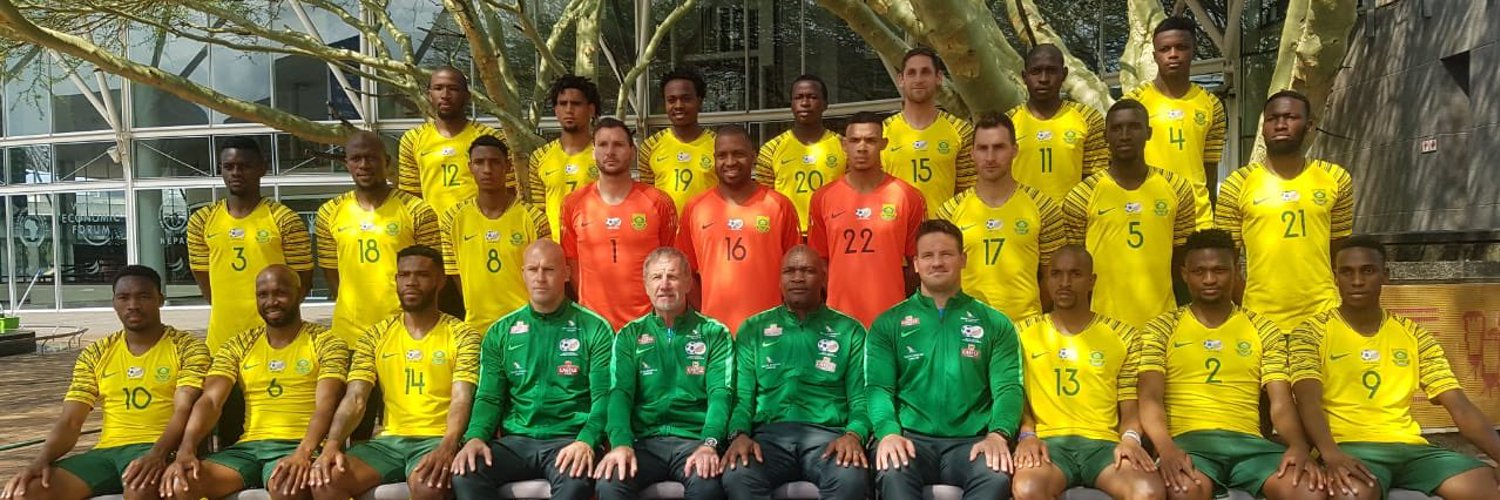
The national team in 2018

After being unable to reach the 2018 FIFA World Cup, South Africa qualified for the 2019 Africa Cup of Nations finishing second and undefeated, with a 2–0 away win over Nigeria. They were grouped with Morocco, Ivory Coast and Namibia, and narrowly qualified to the knockout stage with only a single 1–0 win over Namibia, facing hosts Egypt. The South Africans then pulled out the biggest upset in the tournament, knocking Egypt out in the round of 16 stage with a 1–0 win in Cairo. Then, South Africa once again faced Nigeria in the quarter-finals, with the latter prevailing 2–1.

=== 2020s ===
Under Molefi Ntseki, South Africa failed to qualify for the 2021 Africa Cup of Nations. Molefi Ntseki was then sacked and Hugo Broos was announced as his replacement.

Qualifying for the 2022 FIFA World Cup began with South Africa in a group with Ghana, Zimbabwe, and Ethiopia. South Africa got off to a promising start, beating a weakened Ghana side 1–0 at home on Matchday 2 and going to the top of the group. South Africa remained at the top of the group until the final matchday when they lost 0–1 away to Ghana after a dubious penalty was awarded to Ghana in the first half. South Africa ultimately finished second to Ghana on goals scored, narrowly missing out on qualification for the final 10-team playoff round to qualify for the World Cup. South Africa qualified to the 2023 Africa Cup of Nations after beating Liberia 2–1.

The 2023 AFCON was held in January 2024 in Ivory Coast. South Africa was drawn into a group with Mali, Namibia, and Tunisia. They started their campaign with a 2–0 loss against Mali, followed by a 4–0 win against Namibia, and 0–0 draw against Tunisia. They would finish second in their group and qualify for the knockout stages. In the round of 16, South Africa pulled off a shocking upset and defeated Morocco, a team many had said would win the entire competition, and who also placed fourth at the 2022 World Cup just a year earlier. In the quarter finals, Bafana Bafana would play against Cabo Verde, which ended in a 0–0 draw and went to penalties, in which South Africa would win the shootout 2–1. Captain Ronwen Williams would receive global attention after saving 4 Cabo Verdean shots in the shootout, as well as for his standout performances earlier in the match and against Morocco. In the semi-finals, South Africa would play against rivals Nigeria. The match would end 1–1, and South Africa would fall to the Super Eagles 4–2 on penalties. In the third place match, South Africa would face the Democratic Republic of the Congo, who Bafana would defeat 6–5 on penalties. It was South Africa's highest finish at AFCON since the 2000 edition of the tournament, where they also finished third.

In qualifying for the 2026 World Cup, South Africa were drawn into a group with Nigeria, Benin, Rwanda, Zimbabwe, and Lesotho. Early on, Nigeria would lead the group though Bafana remained close behind them, as did Benin. As the qualifying campaign progressed, Nigeria would slowly start to capitulate, and South Africa's results would start picking up, eventually taking the top spot in the group in 2024. Despite being docked three points in qualifying after fielding an ineligible player, South Africa qualified for the 2026 FIFA World Cup in October 2025 after defeating Rwanda 3–0, ending a 16 year gap since their last appearance, the longest in team history and their first successful qualifying campaign since 2002.

On 5 December 2025, South Africa were drawn into Group A of the 2026 World Cup, playing against Mexico, South Korea, and the Czech Republic.

In December 2025, South Africa competed in the 2025 Africa Cup of Nations, hosted by Morocco, and finished 2nd in Group B, after 2 wins (2–1 win against Angola and 3–2 win against Zimbabwe) and a 1–0 loss against Egypt, who would ultimately finish 4th at the tournament. South Africa had a short knockout journey, as the lost their Round of 16 tie against Cameroon, 2–1, and exited the tournament. As of 19 January 2026, South Africa gained one spot in the FIFA Men's Rankings, climbing to 60th. In their AFCON win against Angola, South Africa ended a 21-year wait for an opening match victory.

In June 2026, South Africa began World Cup group play with a 2–0 defeat against Mexico at Estadio Azteca in the tournament's opening fixture. They would then draw Czechia 1–1 at Mercedes-Benz Stadium thanks to a late penalty from Teboho Mokoena, and beat South Korea 1–0 at Estadio BBVA via a goal from Thapelo Maseko, qualifying for the knockout stages for the first time in the country's history. South Africa were eliminated from the 2026 FIFA World Cup at SoFi Stadium after a 1–0 defeat to Canada in the round of 32, making them the first team eliminated from the knockout stage. After the tournament, Hugo Broos announced his retirement from football, ending his tenure as South Africa's manager. Broos has the longest tenure as coach in the country's footballing history.

Shortly after the conclusion of Bafana Bafana's World Cup run, the country was rocked by the news of the sudden death of Jayden Adams, a midfielder for Mamelodi Sundowns who had played for the national team just weeks earlier. Tributes from across the football world came in from various footballing associations, including those from Canada and Mexico among other nations, footballers, and publications sending condolences and paying their respects. FIFA held a moment of silence in Adams' honour during the quarter-finals with Norway vs. England and Argentina vs. Switzerland on 11 July.

Following the departure of Hugo Broos, Pitso Mosimane was appointed head coach in August 2026.

On 30 September 2026, South Africa marked their 500th match since readmission with a 5–0 victory over Eritrea in the 2027 Africa Cup of Nations qualifiers. The result extended South Africa’s overall record since readmission to 236 wins, 125 draws and 139 losses.

== Team image ==
=== Nickname ===
"Bafana Bafana" is a nickname given to the national side by its fans. It is from Nguni, a language group which includes Swati and Zulu, and translates literally as "the boys, the boys". Its actual meaning in Nguni is, "Go boys! Go boys!", though others take the double use of "Bafana" to mean "all of the boys"---the team and management, as well as the spectators; togetherness, as in the African concept of ubuntu.

Three journalists, namely Molefi Mika, Sello Rabothata, and S'busiso Mseleku, who all jointly penned a weekly soccer column for the South African newspaper The Sowetan, are credited with the decision to use a unique term for the men's national soccer team. Mika is credited with deciding that the term "Bafana Bafana" was a suitable nickname to use for the national soccer team. According to Mika, it was originally the nickname the staff of the newspaper used for their soccer team, the Sowetan Dazzlers, but felt it was better suited as the nickname of the national team. He said the name means boys in Nguni. It was first used in the 4 August 1992 issue of The Sowetan after Mika had consulted with Rabothata and shown the column to Mseleku. It was the first use of the name in print when referring to the team. The name was initially used only informally, as SAFA felt that it was not commercially viable, and that it was degrading to refer to a team of men as boys.

Standton Woodrush Ltd applied to trademark the name in 1993. The trademark was granted but was for clothing only. In 1994, the team's technical sponsor at the time, Kappa, applied for the trademarks "Bafana" and "Bafana Bafana" in class 25. These were granted and subsequently passed on to SAFA. In 1997, SAFA filed for the trademark "Bafana Bafana" for all goods and services, in all classes.

SAFA then applied to have Standton Woodrush Ltd removed from the trademarks register, on the grounds that SAFA was the rightful owner of the name. The case was dismissed on the ground that SAFA was not an interested person within the meaning of this term as used in the Trade Marks Act No. 94 of 1993, which provides that only an interested party has legal standing to seek relief.

SAFA made another application to gain ownership of the trademark, with the second application going to the Appeal Court. The court again found that SAFA did not have the necessary grounds for ownership of the name in all classes. The court held that an intention to use a mark does not create a preference for registration, and that the proprietor of a trademark need not be its originator.

In 2011 SAFA paid R5 million to Standton Woodrush Ltd for rights to the name "Bafana Bafana", in class 25 and all other classes.

=== Home stadiums ===
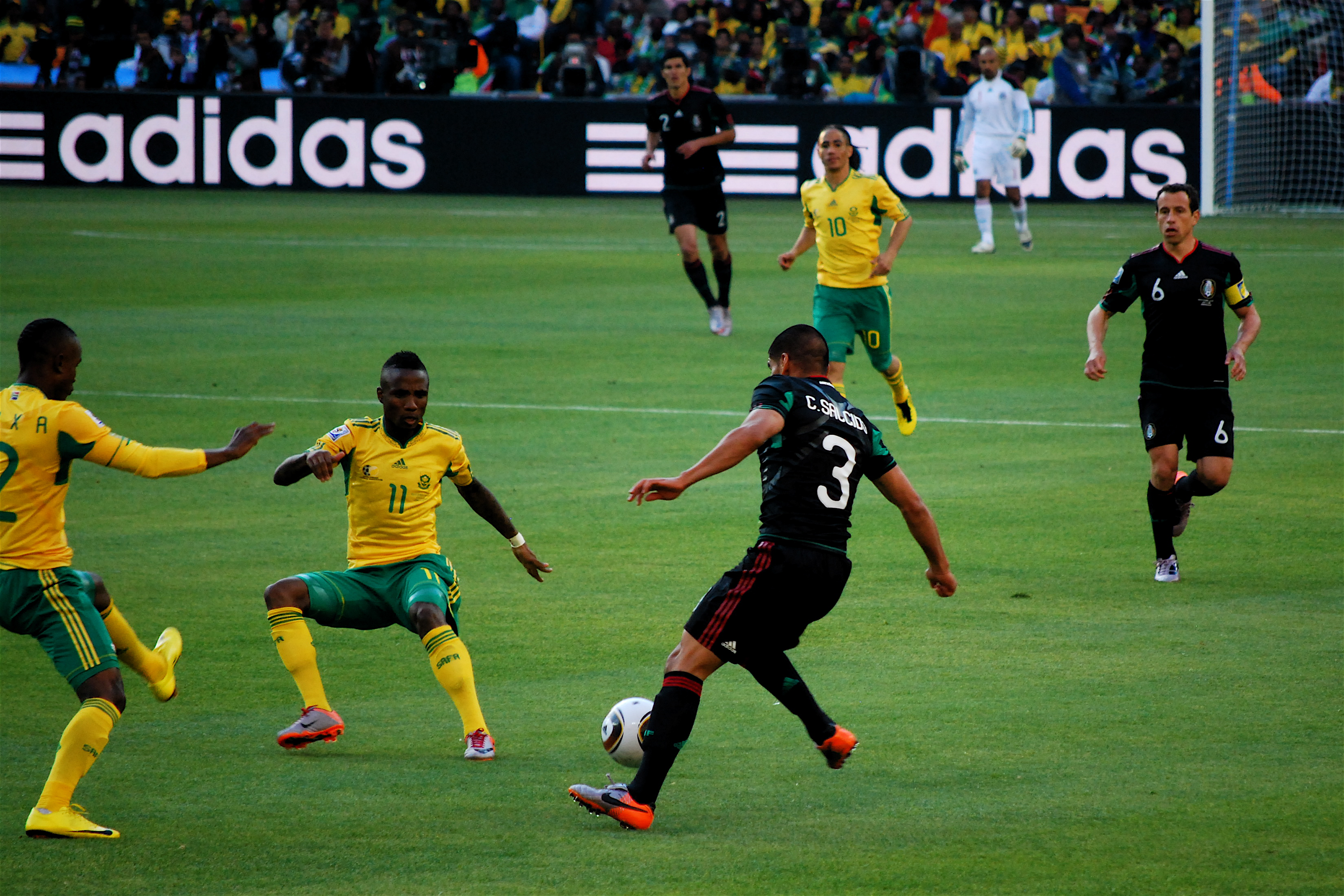
First game of the 2010 FIFA World Cup, South Africa vs Mexico at Soccer City

The South Africa national football team does not use a single stadium as its home stadium for matches. Instead, they use a variety of stadiums throughout South Africa to host matches.

The largest venue used is the 94,700-seater Soccer City in Soweto, outside Johannesburg. Other often used venues include the Atteridgeville Super Stadium, outside Pretoria, the Royal Bafokeng Stadium, outside Rustenburg, the Free State Stadium in Bloemfontein and Moses Mabhida Stadium in Durban.

Matches have also been hosted at Ellis Park in Johannesburg, Kings Park in Durban, Cape Town Stadium in Cape Town, Nelson Mandela Bay Stadium in Gqeberha, Loftus Versfeld in Pretoria, Orlando Stadium in Soweto, and Mbombela Stadium in Mbombela.

The team has also hosted matches outside of South Africa. In preparation for the 1998 FIFA World Cup, the team hosted a friendly in Baiersbronn, Germany. As a warm-up for the 2002 FIFA World Cup, the team hosted a friendly at Mong Kok Stadium in Hong Kong. In 2006 the team hosted a Nelson Mandela Challenge match at Griffin Park, in London, England. During their preparations for the 2010 FIFA World Cup, the team hosted two matches in Germany. The matches were played at the BRITA-Arena in Wiesbaden and the Stadion am Bieberer Berg in Offenbach am Main.

=== Kits and crest ===
Throughout the years, Bafana Bafana has employed multiple logos to represent the team. Notably, they often utilise two primary logos simultaneously on their jerseys.

==== Protea cynaroides emblem ====
The prominent emblem depicting Protea cynaroides, a national symbol of South Africa, particularly in the post-apartheid era, graces the right side of the jersey. This signifies the team's connection to the broader South African sporting landscape.

==== South African Football Association (SAFA) Badge ====
Located on the left side of the jersey, the SAFA badge typically features a star above it, commemorating the team's triumph in the 1996 Africa Cup of Nations.

==== Sponsors ====
When the team returned to international soccer in 1992, their kit was supplied by an Italian clothing company, Kappa. The team wore Kappa kits up to and during the 1998 FIFA World Cup.

Following the 1998 World Cup, the kits for all South African national football teams were supplied by German sports apparel company Adidas. The sponsorship deal is believed to be worth Rs 14 million per year. Their contract with the South African Football Association ran until the end of 2010.

On 7 June 2011, SAFA announced Puma as its new technical sponsor and unveiled Bafana Bafana's new kit.

In October 2013, ABSA announced its resignation as a sponsor of SAFA and the South African national team as of the end of their contract in December 2013. This was followed a week later by the announcement from Puma, that they too would step down as technical sponsors of Bafana Bafana.

From March 2014 until June 2020, the official kit provider was the American sporting apparel company Nike from the international friendly match against Brazil.

From June 2020 to early 2026, the official kit provider was French sporting apparel company Le Coq Sportif.

The team now has one main sponsor, Castle Lager, a brand owned by South African Breweries. Smaller sponsors and suppliers include Energade and Tsogo Sun Hotels.

In 2026, Adidas was signed as the next kit provider for the South African National Team just in time for the 2026 FIFA World Cup, returning for the first time since the 2010 FIFA World Cup.

| Kit provider | Period |
|---|---|
| (Italy) Kappa | 1992–1998 |
| (Germany) Adidas | 1999–2010 |
| (Germany) Puma | 2011–2013 |
| (United States) Nike | 2014–2020 |
| (France) Le Coq Sportif | 2020–2025 |
| (Germany) Adidas | 2026–present |

=== Media coverage ===
The South African Football Association owns the rights to national team matches played in South Africa. SAFA currently has a contract with the South African Broadcasting Corporation, to broadcast these matches. It is up to the SABC to procure the rights to matches played outside of the country.

The SABC usually shows most national team games, though they have often had problems with broadcasting weekday matches. They have previously used delayed live footage, and sometimes not shown matches.

Most large tournaments in which the team play, such as the FIFA World Cup and Africa Cup of Nations, have separate broadcast rights. SuperSport purchase the pay TV rights to these tournaments, thus during these tournaments, they also show South African matches. The SABC usually holds the free to air rights to these tournaments, with the notable exception being the 2002 FIFA World Cup. Those matches were shown by e.tv.

== Results and fixtures ==
The following is a list of match results in the last twelve months, as well as any future matches that have been scheduled.

Win Draw Loss Fixture

=== 2025 ===
| 15 November Friendly | South Africa | 3–1 | Zambia | Gqeberha, South Africa |
| 15:00 UTC+2 | Appollis 43'; Nkota 62'; Sithole 68' | Report | Sabobo 90+2' | Stadium: Nelson Mandela Bay Stadium; Referee: Naftal Negongo (Namibia) |

| 16 December Friendly | South Africa | 1–0 | Ghana A | Soweto, South Africa |
| 16:00 UTC+2 | Mbule 58' | Report | | Stadium: Dobsonville Stadium |

| 22 December 2025 AFCON Group B | South Africa | 2–1 | Angola | Marrakesh, Morocco |
| 18:00 UTC+1 | Appollis 21'; Foster 79' | Report | Show 35' | Stadium: Marrakesh Stadium; Attendance: 4,013; Referee: Mahmood Ismail (Sudan) |

| 26 December 2025 AFCON Group B | Egypt | 1–0 | South Africa | Agadir, Morocco |
| 16:00 UTC+1 | Salah 45' (pen.) | Report | | Stadium: Adrar Stadium; Attendance: 40,219; Referee: Pacifique Ndabihawenimana (Burundi) |

| 29 December 2025 AFCON Group B | Zimbabwe | 2–3 | South Africa | Marrakesh, Morocco |
| 17:00 UTC+1 | Maswanhise 19'; Modiba 73' (o.g.) | Report | Moremi 7'; Foster 50'; Appollis 82' (pen.) | Stadium: Marrakesh Stadium; Attendance: 9,235; Referee: Mustapha Kech Chaf (Morocco) |

=== 2026 ===
| 4 January 2025 AFCON Round of 16 | South Africa | 1–2 | Cameroon | Rabat, Morocco |
| 20:00 UTC+1 | Makgopa 88' | Report | Tchamadeu 34'; Kofane 47' | Stadium: Al Medina Stadium; Attendance: 14,127; Referee: Peter Waweru (Kenya) |

| 27 March Friendly | South Africa | 1–1 | Panama | Durban, South Africa |
| 19:00 UTC+2 | Appollis 48' | Report | Bárcenas 23' | Stadium: Moses Mabhida Stadium; Attendance: 14,000; Referee: Thabang Ketshabile (Botswana) |

| 31 March Friendly | South Africa | 1–2 | Panama | Cape Town, South Africa |
| 19:30 UTC+2 | Mbokazi 64' | Report | Córdoba 58'; Ramos 77' | Stadium: Cape Town Stadium; Referee: Thabang Ketshabile (Botswana) |

| 29 May Friendly | South Africa | 0–0 | Nicaragua | Soweto, South Africa |
| 21:30 UTC+2 | | Report | | Stadium: Orlando Stadium; Referee: Lebalang Mokete (Lesotho) |

| 6 June Friendly | Jamaica | 1–1 | South Africa | Pachuca, Mexico (BCD) |
| 15:30 UTC−6 | Atkinson 90+3' | Report | Foster 32' | Stadium: Estadio Hidalgo |

| 11 June 2026 FIFA World Cup | Mexico | 2–0 | South Africa | Mexico City, Mexico |
| 13:00 UTC−6 | Quiñones 9'; Jiménez 67' | Report | | Stadium: Estadio Azteca; Attendance: 80,824; Referee: Wilton Sampaio (Brazil) |

| 18 June 2026 FIFA World Cup | Czech Republic | 1–1 | South Africa | Atlanta, Georgia, United States |
| 12:00 UTC−4 | Sadílek 6' | Report | Mokoena 83' (pen.) | Stadium: Mercedes-Benz Stadium; Attendance: 67,442; Referee: Tori Penso (United States); Man of the Match: Teboho Mokoena |

| 25 June 2026 FIFA World Cup | South Africa | 1–0 | South Korea | Guadalupe, Mexico |
| 19:00 UTC−6 | Maseko 63' | Report | | Stadium: Estadio BBVA; Attendance: 51,243; Referee: Facundo Tello (Argentina); Man of the Match: Thapelo Maseko |

| 28 June 2026 FIFA World Cup Round of 32 | South Africa | 0–1 | Canada | Inglewood, California, United States |
| 12:00 UTC−7 | | Report | Eustáquio 90+2' | Stadium: SoFi Stadium; Attendance: 69,237; Referee: João Pinheiro (Portugal) |

| 26 September 2027 AFCON qualification | South Africa | 2–1 | Guinea | Johannesburg, South Africa |
| 15:00 UTC+2 | Okon 30'; Kabini 77' | Report | Cissé 69' | Stadium: Orlando Stadium; Referee: Sadou Ali Brahamou (Niger); Man of the Match: Kamogelo Sebelebele |

| 30 September 2027 AFCON qualification | Eritrea | 0–5 | South Africa | Cairo, Egypt |
| 19:00 UTC+3 | | Report | Mofokeng 19', 45+1'; Sithole 52'; Rayners 62'; Singh 90+4' | Stadium: Al Salam Stadium; Referee: Lamin Jammeh (The Gambia); Man of the Match: Relebohile Mofokeng |

| 4 October Friendly | Egypt | 0–1 | South Africa | Cairo, Egypt |
| 21:00 UTC+3 | | Report | Dithejane 51' | Stadium: Cairo International Stadium; Referee: Nabil Boukhalfa (Algeria) |

| 13 November 2027 AFCON qualification | South Africa | 2–2 | Kenya | Johannesburg, South Africa |
| 18:00 SAST | Wanjala 9' (o.g.); Mofokeng 77' | Report | Olunga 44' (pen.); Ogam 90' | Stadium: Orlando Stadium; Referee: Patrice Mebiame (Gabon); Man of the Match: Relebohile Mofokeng |

| 17 November 2027 AFCON qualification | Kenya | 1–2 | South Africa | Nairobi, Kenya |
| 18:00 UTC+2 | Bajaber 89' | Report | Mofokeng 68', 86' | Stadium: Nyayo National Stadium; Referee: Dahane Beida (Mauritania); Man of the Match: Relebohile Mofokeng |

=== 2027 ===
| 24 March 2027 AFCON qualification | Guinea | v | South Africa | TBD |
| TBD | | | | Stadium: TBD |

| 28 March 2027 AFCON qualification | South Africa | v | Eritrea | TBD, South Africa |
| TBD | | | | Stadium: TBD |

== Coaching staff ==
| Position | Staff |
|---|---|
| Technical Director | (South Africa) Molefi Ntseki |
| Head coach | (South Africa) Pitso Mosimane |
| Assistant Coach | (South Africa) Morena Ramoreboli |
| Assistant Analyst | (South Africa) Tshepo Mohao |
| Goalkeeper Coach | (South Africa) Marcus Mashilo |
| Opposition Analyst | (South Africa) Goolam Valodia |
| Strength and Conditioning Coach | (South Africa) Kabelo Rangoaga |
| Performance Analyst | (South Africa) Musi Matlaba |

=== Coaching history ===
Caretaker managers are listed in italics.

- (England) Alan Rogers (1963)
- (England) Jeff Butler (1992)
- (South Africa) Stanley Tshabalala (1992)
- (South Africa) Ephraim Mashaba (1992)
- (Peru) Augusto Palacios (1992–93)
- (South Africa) Clive Barker (1994–97)
- (South Africa) Jomo Sono (1998)
- (France) Philippe Troussier (1998)
- (South Africa) Trott Moloto (1998–00)
- (Portugal) Carlos Queiroz (2000–02)
- (South Africa) Ephraim Mashaba (2001)
- (South Africa) Trott Moloto (2002)
- (South Africa) Jomo Sono (2002)
- (South Africa) Ephraim Mashaba (2002–04, 2014–16)
- (South Africa) Jomo Sono (2003)
- (South Africa) April Phumo (2004)
- (Scotland) Stuart Baxter (2004–05, 2017–19)
- (Romania) Ted Dumitru (2005–06)
- (South Africa) Pitso Mosimane (2006)
- (Brazil) Carlos Alberto Parreira (2007–08, 2009–10)
- (Brazil) Joel Santana (2008–09)
- (South Africa) Pitso Mosimane (2010–12, 2026–)
- (South Africa) Steve Komphela (2012)
- (South Africa) Gordon Igesund (2012–14)
- (South Africa) Molefi Ntseki (2019–21)
- (South Africa) Helman Mkhalele (2021)
- (Belgium) Hugo Broos (2021–26)

== Players ==
=== Current squad ===
The following players were included in the final squad for the 2027 Africa Cup of Nations qualification matches against Kenya on 13 and 15 November 2026.

Caps and goals correct as of 17 November 2026, after the match against Kenya.

| No. | Pos. | Player | Date of birth (age) | Caps | Goals | Club |
|---|---|---|---|---|---|---|
| 1 | GK | Ronwen Williams (captain) | 21 January 1992 (age 34) | 73 | 0 | (South African Football Association) Mamelodi Sundowns |
| 16 | GK | Sipho Chaine | 14 December 1996 (age 29) | 5 | 0 | (South African Football Association) Orlando Pirates |
| 22 | GK | Ricardo Goss | 2 April 1994 (age 32) | 8 | 0 | (South African Football Association) Mamelodi Sundowns |
| 2 | DF | Thabang Matuludi | 14 January 1999 (age 27) | 7 | 0 | (South African Football Association) Mamelodi Sundowns |
| 5 | DF | Lebone Seema | 5 April 2003 (age 23) | 2 | 0 | (South African Football Association) Orlando Pirates |
| 6 | DF | Aubrey Modiba | 22 July 1995 (age 31) | 48 | 1 | (South African Football Association) Mamelodi Sundowns |
| 14 | DF | Mbekezeli Mbokazi | 19 September 2005 (age 21) | 16 | 1 | (United States Soccer Federation) Chicago Fire |
| 18 | DF | Samukele Kabini | 15 March 2004 (age 22) | 10 | 1 | (Norwegian Football Federation) Molde |
| 21 | DF | Ime Okon | 20 February 2004 (age 22) | 12 | 1 | (German Football Association) Hannover 96 |
| 23 | DF | Thapelo Morena | 6 August 1993 (age 33) | 39 | 3 | (South African Football Association) Mamelodi Sundowns |
| 24 | DF | Olwethu Makhanya | 30 April 2004 (age 22) | 7 | 0 | (Scottish Football Association) Rangers |
| | DF | Fawaaz Basadien | 23 December 1996 (age 29) | 6 | 0 | (South African Football Association) Mamelodi Sundowns |
| 4 | MF | Teboho Mokoena | 24 January 1997 (age 29) | 60 | 10 | (South African Football Association) Mamelodi Sundowns |
| 5 | MF | Thalente Mbatha | 6 March 2000 (age 26) | 21 | 3 | (South African Football Association) Orlando Pirates |
| 13 | MF | Sphephelo Sithole | 3 March 1999 (age 27) | 37 | 2 | (Portuguese Football Federation) Tondela |
| 15 | MF | Bathusi Aubaas | 11 July 1998 (age 28) | 21 | 1 | (South African Football Association) Mamelodi Sundowns |
| 20 | MF | Brooklyn Poggenpoel | 3 October 1999 (age 27) | 2 | 0 | (South African Football Association) Durban City |
| 7 | FW | Oswin Appollis | 25 August 2001 (age 25) | 36 | 8 | (South African Football Association) Orlando Pirates |
| 8 | FW | Tshepang Moremi | 2 October 2000 (age 26) | 15 | 1 | (South African Football Association) Orlando Pirates |
| 9 | FW | Lyle Foster | 3 September 2000 (age 26) | 32 | 11 | (United States Soccer Federation) Houston Dynamo |
| 10 | FW | Relebohile Mofokeng | 23 October 2004 (age 22) | 22 | 6 | (Royal Belgian Football Association) Union Saint-Gilloise |
| 11 | FW | Puso Dithejane | 24 July 2004 (age 22) | 3 | 1 | (United States Soccer Federation) Chicago Fire |
| 12 | FW | Iqraam Rayners | 19 December 1995 (age 30) | 29 | 6 | (South African Football Association) Mamelodi Sundowns |
| 17 | FW | Luther Singh | 5 August 1997 (age 29) | 11 | 2 | (Cyprus Football Association) AEL Limassol |
| 19 | FW | Cassius Mailula | 12 June 2001 (age 25) | 4 | 0 | (South African Football Association) Mamelodi Sundowns |
| 25 | FW | Tashreeq Matthews | 12 September 2000 (age 26) | 2 | 0 | (South African Football Association) Mamelodi Sundowns |
| 27 | FW | Siyanda Ndlovu | 19 September 2002 (age 24) | 1 | 0 | (South African Football Association) Mamelodi Sundowns |

=== Recent call-ups ===
The following players were called up to a squad in the last 12 months. Caps and goals relate to the time at which the matches were played.

| Pos. | Player | Date of birth (age) | Caps | Goals | Club | Latest call-up |
|---|---|---|---|---|---|---|
| GK | Thakasani Mbanjwa | 7 May 1996 (age 30) | 0 | 0 | (South Africa) Lamontville Golden Arrows | v. Kenya, 13 November 2026 ^{PRE} |
| GK | Brandon Petersen | 22 September 1994 (age 32) | 0 | 0 | (South Africa) Kaizer Chiefs | 2026 FIFA World Cup ^{PRE} |
| GK | Renaldo Leaner | 12 February 1998 (age 28) | 3 | 0 | (South Africa) Kaizer Chiefs | v. Panama, 31 March 2026 |
| GK | Darren Johnson | 22 February 1997 (age 29) | 0 | 0 | (South Africa) AmaZulu | v. Panama, 31 March 2026 |
| DF | Nkosikhona Radebe | 11 February 2001 (age 25) | 0 | 0 | (South Africa) AmaZulu | v. Kenya, 13 November 2026 ^{PRE} |
| DF | Khulumani Ndamane | 5 February 2004 (age 22) | 6 | 0 | (South Africa) Mamelodi Sundowns | v. Kenya, 13 November 2026 ^{PRE} |
| DF | Nkosinathi Sibisi | 22 September 1995 (age 31) | 24 | 0 | (South Africa) Orlando Pirates | v. Kenya, 13 November 2026 ^{PRE} |
| DF | Aden McCarthy | 4 December 2003 (age 22) | 1 | 0 | (Azerbaijan) Sabah | v. Kenya, 13 November 2026 ^{PRE} |
| DF | Kamogelo Sebelebele | 21 July 2002 (age 24) | 7 | 0 | (South Africa) Orlando Pirates | v. Eritrea, 30 September 2026 |
| DF | Tshepho Mashiloane | 30 April 2002 (age 24) | 0 | 0 | (South Africa) Sekhukhune United | v. Guinea, 26 September 2026 ^{PRE} |
| DF | Khuliso Mudau | 26 April 1995 (age 31) | 38 | 1 | (South Africa) Mamelodi Sundowns | 2026 FIFA World Cup |
| DF | Bradley Cross | 30 January 2001 (age 25) | 2 | 0 | (South Africa) Kaizer Chiefs | 2026 FIFA World Cup |
| DF | Thabiso Monyane | 30 April 2000 (age 26) | 2 | 0 | (South Africa) Kaizer Chiefs | 2026 FIFA World Cup ^{PRE} |
| DF | Deano van Rooyen | 24 November 1996 (age 29) | 2 | 0 | (South Africa) Mamelodi Sundowns | v. Panama, 31 March 2026 |
| DF | Tylon Smith | 9 May 2005 (age 21) | 1 | 0 | (United States) New England Revolution | v. Panama, 31 March 2026 |
| DF | Vuyo Letlapa | 8 August 2003 (age 23) | 0 | 0 | (South Africa) Sekhukhune United | v. Panama, 31 March 2026 |
| DF | Siyabonga Ngezana | 15 July 1997 (age 29) | 12 | 0 | (Romania) FCSB | 2025 Africa Cup of Nations |
| DF | Thabo Moloisane | 24 February 1999 (age 27) | 2 | 0 | (South Africa) Kaizer Chiefs | 2025 Africa Cup of Nations |
| DF | Malibongwe Khoza | 16 March 2004 (age 22) | 4 | 0 | (South Africa) Mamelodi Sundowns | 2025 Africa Cup of Nations ^{PRE} |
| DF | Keegan Allan | 7 August 2000 (age 26) | 0 | 0 | (South Africa) AmaZulu | 2025 Africa Cup of Nations ^{PRE} |
| DF | Fezile Gcaba | 3 March 1999 (age 27) | 0 | 0 | (South Africa) Durban City | 2025 Africa Cup of Nations ^{PRE} |
| MF | Lebohang Maboe | 17 September 1994 (age 32) | 8 | 0 | (South Africa) Kaizer Chiefs | v. Kenya, 13 November 2026 ^{PRE} |
| MF | Luke Le Roux | 10 March 2000 (age 26) | 9 | 0 | (Belgium) Cercle Brugge | v. Kenya, 13 November 2026 ^{PRE} |
| MF | Cemran Dansin | 30 March 2005 (age 21) | 0 | 0 | (South Africa) Orlando Pirates | v. Guinea, 26 September 2026 ^{PRE} |
| MF | Ndamulelo Maphangule | 22 October 1999 (age 27) | 3 | 0 | (South Africa) Polokwane City | v. Panama, 31 March 2026 |
| MF | Mthetheleli Mthiyane | 21 January 2001 (age 25) | 0 | 0 | (South Africa) Orlando Pirates | v. Panama, 31 March 2026 |
| MF | Sipho Mbule | 22 March 1998 (age 28) | 8 | 0 | (Iraq) Zakho | 2025 Africa Cup of Nations |
| MF | Mduduzi Shabalala | 20 January 2004 (age 22) | 1 | 0 | (South Africa) Kaizer Chiefs | 2025 Africa Cup of Nations |
| MF | Sphesihle Maduna | 26 December 1999 (age 26) | 0 | 0 | (South Africa) AmaZulu | 2025 Africa Cup of Nations ^{PRE} |
| MF | Siphesihle Mkhize | 5 February 1999 (age 27) | 0 | 0 | (South Africa) Sekhukhune United | 2025 Africa Cup of Nations ^{PRE} |
| MF | Masindi Nemtajela | 23 August 2001 (age 25) | 0 | 0 | (South Africa) Orlando Pirates | 2025 Africa Cup of Nations ^{PRE} |
| FW | Themba Zwane (vice-captain) | 3 August 1989 (age 37) | 57 | 12 | (South Africa) Mamelodi Sundowns | v. Kenya, 13 November 2026 ^{PRE} |
| FW | Thapelo Maseko | 11 November 2003 (age 23) | 14 | 2 | (Denmark) Copenhagen | v. Kenya, 13 November 2026 ^{INJ} |
| FW | Devin Titus | 18 May 2001 (age 25) | 1 | 0 | (Morocco) Maghreb Fez | v. Kenya, 13 November 2026 ^{PRE} |
| FW | Boitumelo Radiopane | 21 January 2002 (age 24) | 0 | 0 | (South Africa) Orlando Pirates | v. Kenya, 13 November 2026 ^{PRE} |
| FW | Nqaba Xulu | 12 August 2003 (age 23) | 0 | 0 | (South Africa) Richards Bay | v. Kenya, 13 November 2026 ^{PRE} |
| FW | Shandre Campbell | 15 July 2005 (age 21) | 1 | 0 | (Belgium) Kortrijk | v. Egypt, 4 October 2026 |
| FW | Yanela Mbuthuma | 23 February 2002 (age 24) | 3 | 0 | (South Africa) Orlando Pirates | v. Egypt, 4 October 2026 |
| FW | Ronaldo van Neel | 8 August 2002 (age 24) | 0 | 0 | (South Africa) Lamontville Golden Arrows | v. Guinea, 26 September 2026 ^{PRE} |
| FW | Evidence Makgopa | 5 June 2000 (age 26) | 32 | 6 | (South Africa) Orlando Pirates | 2026 FIFA World Cup |
| FW | Patrick Maswanganyi | 4 April 1998 (age 28) | 5 | 2 | (Bahrain) Al-Khaldiya | 2026 FIFA World Cup ^{PRE} |
| FW | Bongokuhle Hlongwane | 20 June 2000 (age 26) | 19 | 4 | (United States) Minnesota United | v. Panama, 31 March 2026 |
| FW | Mohau Nkota | 9 November 2004 (age 22) | 9 | 2 | (South Africa) Orlando Pirates | v. Panama, 31 March 2026 |
| FW | Elias Mokwana | 8 September 1999 (age 27) | 11 | 2 | (South Africa) Kaizer Chiefs | 2025 Africa Cup of Nations |
| FW | Mihlali Mayambela | 25 August 1996 (age 30) | 16 | 2 | (Cyprus) Omonia | 2025 Africa Cup of Nations ^{PRE} |
| FW | Ashley Cupido | 5 May 2001 (age 25) | 3 | 1 | (Israel) Kiryat Yam | 2025 Africa Cup of Nations ^{PRE} |
| FW | Keletso Makgalwa | 3 January 1997 (age 29) | 0 | 0 | (Tanzania) Simba | 2025 Africa Cup of Nations ^{PRE} |
Notes: ^{INJ} = Withdrew due to injury; ^{PRE} = Preliminary squad; ^{RET} = Retired from the national team; ^{SUS} = Serving suspension; ^{WD} = Player withdrew from the squad due to non-injury issue.

=== Africa Cup of Nations ===
- 1996 African Cup of Nations
- 1998 African Cup of Nations
- 2000 African Cup of Nations
- 2002 African Cup of Nations
- 2004 African Cup of Nations
- 2006 Africa Cup of Nations
- 2008 Africa Cup of Nations
- 2013 Africa Cup of Nations
- 2015 Africa Cup of Nations
- 2019 Africa Cup of Nations
- 2023 Africa Cup of Nations
- 2025 Africa Cup of Nations

=== FIFA Confederations Cup ===
- 1997 FIFA Confederations Cup
- 2009 FIFA Confederations Cup

=== FIFA World Cup ===
- 1998 FIFA World Cup
- 2002 FIFA World Cup
- 2010 FIFA World Cup
- 2026 FIFA World Cup

=== CONCACAF Gold Cup ===
- 2005 CONCACAF Gold Cup

== Records ==
As of match played 17 November 2026
Players in bold are still active with South Africa.

=== Most appearances ===
| Rank | Player | Caps | Goals | Career |
|---|---|---|---|---|
| 1 | Aaron Mokoena | 106 | 1 | 1999–2010 |
| 2 | Itumeleng Khune | 91 | 0 | 2008–2020 |
| 3 | Siphiwe Tshabalala | 86 | 12 | 2006–2017 |
| 4 | Siyabonga Nomvethe | 79 | 15 | 1999–2012 |
| 4 | Benni McCarthy | 79 | 31 | 1997–2012 |
| 6 | John Moshoeu | 73 | 8 | 1992–2004 |
| 6 | Shaun Bartlett | 73 | 28 | 1995–2005 |
| 6 | **Ronwen Williams** | 73 | 0 | 2014–present |
| 9 | Lucas Radebe | 70 | 2 | 1992–2003 |
| 9 | Delron Buckley | 70 | 8 | 1999–2008 |

=== Top goalscorers ===
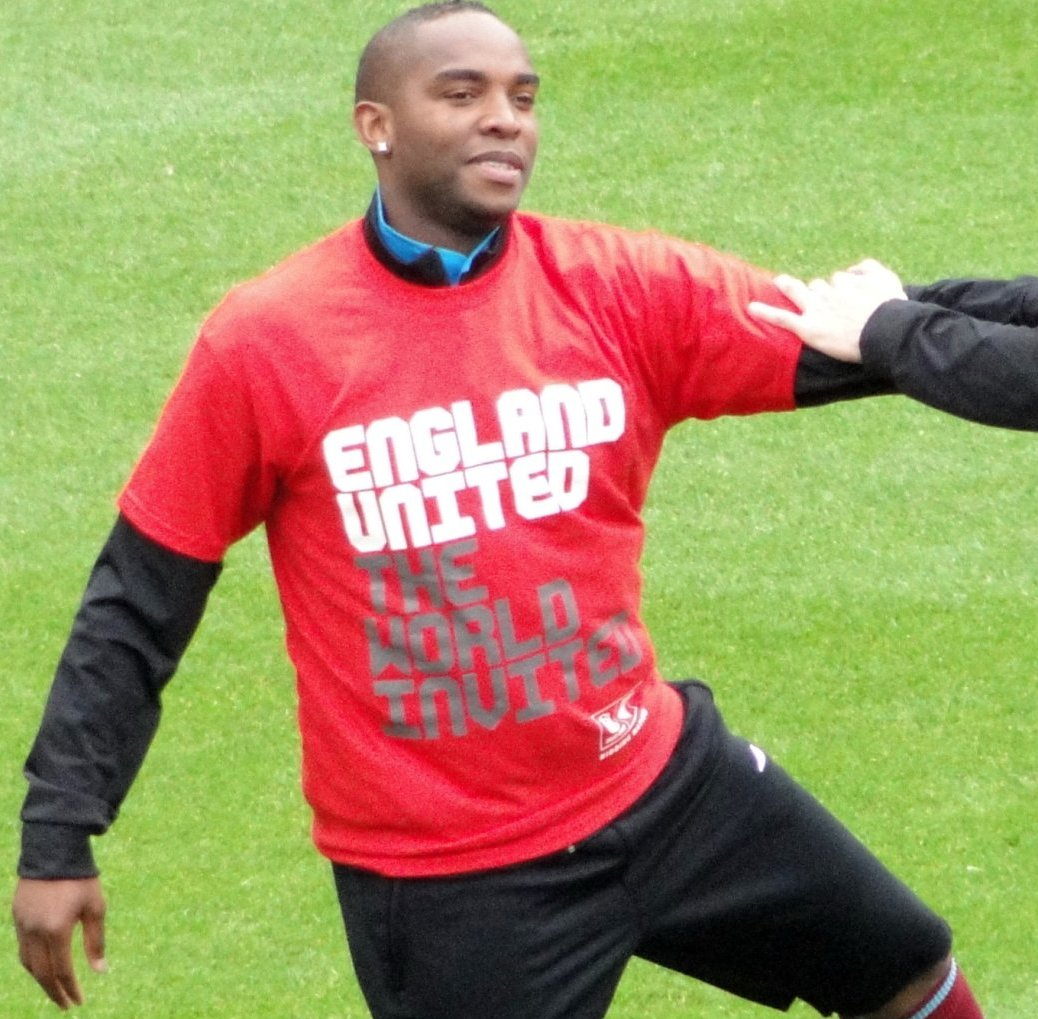
Benni McCarthy is South Africa's top scorer with 31 goals

| Rank | Player | Goals | Caps | Ratio | Career |
|---|---|---|---|---|---|
| 1 | Benni McCarthy | 31 | 79 | 0.39 | 1997–2012 |
| 2 | Shaun Bartlett | 28 | 73 | 0.38 | 1995–2005 |
| 3 | Bernard Parker | 23 | 69 | 0.33 | 2007–2015 |
| 4 | Katlego Mphela | 20 | 50 | 0.4 | 2005–2013 |
| 5 | Phil Masinga | 18 | 58 | 0.31 | 1992–2001 |
| 6 | Percy Tau | 16 | 52 | 0.31 | 2015–2025 |
| 7 | Siyabonga Nomvethe | 15 | 79 | 0.19 | 1999–2012 |
| 8 | Tokelo Rantie | 12 | 41 | 0.29 | 2012–2017 |
| 8 | **Themba Zwane** | 12 | 57 | 0.21 | 2014–present |
| 8 | Siphiwe Tshabalala | 12 | 86 | 0.14 | 2006–2017 |

== Competitive record ==
=== FIFA World Cup ===
South Africa has made four appearances in the World Cup, making it past the first round once. The team's first attempt to qualify was for the 1994 World Cup, two years after they had been readmitted to FIFA. Their first appearance was in France 1998. Despite a 3–0 drubbing to France in their opening game, they went on to draw against Denmark and Saudi Arabia; the team finished third and thus exited the tournament. Korea/Japan 2002 saw them eliminated in the group stage again after drawing to Paraguay and beating Slovenia 1–0 for their first-ever World Cup win. The team finished third in their group, losing out to Paraguay on goal difference.

Hosting the 2010 World Cup, they famously upset France 2–1 and drew 1–1 to Mexico, but lost 0–3 to Uruguay. They failed to advance to the round of 16, and became the first host country to fail to advance past the group stage. This would begin a long gap between appearances at the tournament for Bafana Bafana, but eventually ended after they qualified for the 2026 edition of the tournament, and made it to the round of 32 for the first time.

| FIFA World Cup record | | | | | | | | | Qualification record | | | | | |
| Year | Round | Position | Pld | W | D | L | GF | GA | Pld | W | D | L | GF | GA |
|---|---|---|---|---|---|---|---|---|---|---|---|---|---|---|
| (Uruguay) 1930 to (Chile) 1962 | Not a FIFA member | | | | | | | | Not a FIFA member | | | | | |
| (England) 1966 | Not admitted | | | | | | | | Not admitted | | | | | |
| (Mexico) 1970 | Banned | | | | | | | | Banned | | | | | |
| (Germany) 1974 | Banned | | | | | | | | Banned | | | | | |
| (Argentina) 1978 | Banned | | | | | | | | Banned | | | | | |
| (Spain) 1982 | Banned | | | | | | | | Banned | | | | | |
| (Mexico) 1986 | Banned | | | | | | | | Banned | | | | | |
| (Italy) 1990 | Banned | | | | | | | | Banned | | | | | |
| (United States) 1994 | Did not qualify | | | | | | | | 4 | 2 | 1 | 1 | 2 | 4 |
| (France) 1998 | Group stage | 24th | 3 | 0 | 2 | 1 | 3 | 6 | 8 | 6 | 1 | 1 | 11 | 3 |
| (South Korea) (Japan) 2002 | Group stage | 17th | 3 | 1 | 1 | 1 | 5 | 5 | 8 | 7 | 1 | 0 | 13 | 3 |
| (Germany) 2006 | Did not qualify | | | | | | | | 10 | 5 | 1 | 4 | 12 | 14 |
| (South Africa) 2010 | Group stage | 20th | 3 | 1 | 1 | 1 | 3 | 5 | 6 | 2 | 1 | 3 | 5 | 5 |
| (Brazil) 2014 | Did not qualify | | | | | | | | 6 | 3 | 2 | 1 | 12 | 5 |
| (Russia) 2018 | Did not qualify | | | | | | | | 8 | 3 | 1 | 4 | 11 | 11 |
| (Qatar) 2022 | Did not qualify | | | | | | | | 6 | 4 | 1 | 1 | 6 | 2 |
| (Canada) (Mexico) (United States) 2026 | Round of 32 | 26th | 4 | 1 | 1 | 2 | 2 | 4 | 10 | 5 | 3 | 2 | 14 | 9 |
| (Morocco) (Portugal) (Spain) 2030 | To be determined | | | | | | | | To be determined | | | | | |
| (Saudi Arabia) 2034 | To be determined | | | | | | | | To be determined | | | | | |
| Total: 4/15 | Round of 32 | 17th | 12 | 3 | 5 | 4 | 13 | 20 | 66 | 37 | 12 | 17 | 87 | 56 |

South Africa's World Cup record
| First Match | France 3–0 South Africa (12 June 1998; Marseille, France) |
| Biggest Win | South Africa 1–0 Slovenia (8 June 2002; Daegu, South Korea); South Africa 2–1 France (22 June 2010; Bloemfontein, South Africa); South Africa 1–0 South Korea (24 June 2026; Guadalupe, Mexico) |
| Biggest Defeat | France 3–0 South Africa (12 June 1998; Marseille, France) Uruguay 3–0 South Africa (16 June 2010; Pretoria, South Africa) |
| Best Result | Round of 32 in 2026 |
| Worst Result | Group stage in 1998, 2002 and 2010 |

=== FIFA Confederations Cup ===
FIFA Confederations Cup record
| Year | Round | Position | Pld | W | D* | L | GF | GA | Squad |
|---|---|---|---|---|---|---|---|---|---|
| (Saudi Arabia) 1992 | Banned | | | | | | | | |
| (Saudi Arabia) 1995 | Did not qualify | | | | | | | | |
| (Saudi Arabia) 1997 | Group stage | 8th | 3 | 0 | 1 | 2 | 5 | 7 | Squad |
| (Mexico) 1999 | Did not qualify | | | | | | | | |
| (South Korea) (Japan) 2001 | Did not qualify | | | | | | | | |
| (France) 2003 | Did not qualify | | | | | | | | |
| (Germany) 2005 | Did not qualify | | | | | | | | |
| (South Africa) 2009 | Fourth place | 4th | 5 | 1 | 1 | 3 | 4 | 6 | Squad |
| (Brazil) 2013 | Did not qualify | | | | | | | | |
| (Russia) 2017 | Did not qualify | | | | | | | | |
| Total | Fourth place | 2/10 | 8 | 1 | 2 | 5 | 9 | 13 | — |

South Africa's Confederations Cup record
| First Match | South Africa 2–2 Czech Republic (13 December 1997; Riyadh, Saudi Arabia) |
| Biggest Win | South Africa 2–0 New Zealand (17 June 2009; Rustenburg, South Africa) |
| Biggest Defeat | Spain 2–0 South Africa (20 June 2009; Bloemfontein, South Africa) |
| Best Result | Fourth place at the 2009 FIFA Confederations Cup |
| Worst Result | 8th place at the 1997 FIFA Confederations Cup |

=== Africa Cup of Nations ===
| Africa Cup of Nations record | | | | | | | | | Qualification record | | | | | |
| Year | Round | Position | Pld | W | D | L | GF | GA | Pld | W | D | L | GF | GA |
|---|---|---|---|---|---|---|---|---|---|---|---|---|---|---|
| (Sudan) 1957 | Qualified, later disqualified due to apartheid | | | | | | | | Qualified, later disqualified | | | | | |
| (United Arab Republic) 1959 | Banned due to apartheid | | | | | | | | Banned due to apartheid | | | | | |
| (Ethiopia) 1962 | Banned due to apartheid | | | | | | | | Banned due to apartheid | | | | | |
| (Ghana) 1963 | Banned due to apartheid | | | | | | | | Banned due to apartheid | | | | | |
| (Tunisia) 1965 | Banned due to apartheid | | | | | | | | Banned due to apartheid | | | | | |
| (Ethiopia) 1968 | Banned due to apartheid | | | | | | | | Banned due to apartheid | | | | | |
| (Sudan) 1970 | Banned due to apartheid | | | | | | | | Banned due to apartheid | | | | | |
| (Cameroon) 1972 | Banned due to apartheid | | | | | | | | Banned due to apartheid | | | | | |
| (Egypt) 1974 | Banned due to apartheid | | | | | | | | Banned due to apartheid | | | | | |
| (Ethiopia) 1976 | Banned due to apartheid | | | | | | | | Banned due to apartheid | | | | | |
| (Ghana) 1978 | Banned due to apartheid | | | | | | | | Banned due to apartheid | | | | | |
| (Nigeria) 1980 | Banned due to apartheid | | | | | | | | Banned due to apartheid | | | | | |
| (Libya) 1982 | Banned due to apartheid | | | | | | | | Banned due to apartheid | | | | | |
| (Ivory Coast) 1984 | Banned due to apartheid | | | | | | | | Banned due to apartheid | | | | | |
| (Egypt) 1986 | Banned due to apartheid | | | | | | | | Banned due to apartheid | | | | | |
| (Morocco) 1988 | Banned due to apartheid | | | | | | | | Banned due to apartheid | | | | | |
| (Algeria) 1990 | Banned due to apartheid | | | | | | | | Banned due to apartheid | | | | | |
| (Senegal) 1992 | Banned due to apartheid | | | | | | | | Banned due to apartheid | | | | | |
| (Tunisia) 1994 | Did not qualify | | | | | | | | 6 | 1 | 2 | 3 | 5 | 10 |
| (South Africa) 1996 | Champions | 1st | 6 | 5 | 0 | 1 | 11 | 2 | Qualified as hosts | | | | | |
| (Burkina Faso) 1998 | Runners-up | 2nd | 6 | 3 | 2 | 1 | 9 | 6 | Qualified as defending champions | | | | | |
| (Ghana) (Nigeria) 2000 | Third place | 3rd | 6 | 3 | 2 | 1 | 8 | 6 | 6 | 3 | 2 | 1 | 10 | 5 |
| (Mali) 2002 | Quarter-finals | 6th | 4 | 1 | 2 | 1 | 3 | 3 | 6 | 3 | 3 | 0 | 9 | 4 |
| (Tunisia) 2004 | Group stage | 11th | 3 | 1 | 1 | 1 | 3 | 5 | 4 | 3 | 1 | 0 | 6 | 1 |
| (Egypt) 2006 | Group stage | 16th | 3 | 0 | 0 | 3 | 0 | 5 | 10 | 5 | 1 | 4 | 12 | 14 |
| (Ghana) 2008 | Group stage | 13th | 3 | 0 | 2 | 1 | 3 | 5 | 6 | 3 | 2 | 1 | 10 | 4 |
| (Angola) 2010 | Did not qualify | | | | | | | | 6 | 2 | 1 | 3 | 5 | 5 |
| (Equatorial Guinea) (Gabon) 2012 | Did not qualify | | | | | | | | 6 | 2 | 3 | 1 | 4 | 2 |
| (South Africa) 2013 | Quarter-finals | 6th | 4 | 1 | 3 | 0 | 5 | 3 | Qualified as hosts | | | | | |
| (Equatorial Guinea) 2015 | Group stage | 15th | 3 | 0 | 1 | 2 | 3 | 6 | 6 | 3 | 3 | 0 | 9 | 3 |
| (Gabon) 2017 | Did not qualify | | | | | | | | 6 | 1 | 4 | 1 | 8 | 6 |
| (Egypt) 2019 | Quarter-finals | 7th | 5 | 2 | 0 | 3 | 3 | 4 | 6 | 3 | 3 | 0 | 11 | 2 |
| (Cameroon) 2021 | Did not qualify | | | | | | | | 6 | 3 | 1 | 2 | 8 | 7 |
| (Ivory Coast) 2023 | Third place | 3rd | 7 | 2 | 4 | 1 | 7 | 3 | 4 | 3 | 1 | 0 | 7 | 3 |
| (Morocco) 2025 | Round of 16 | 10th | 4 | 2 | 0 | 2 | 6 | 6 | 6 | 4 | 2 | 0 | 16 | 5 |
| (Kenya) (Tanzania) (Uganda) 2027 | To be determined | | | | | | | | 2 | 2 | 0 | 0 | 7 | 1 |
| 2028 | To be determined | | | | | | | | To be determined | | | | | |
| Total | 1 Title | 12/35 | 54 | 20 | 17 | 17 | 61 | 54 | 84 | 39 | 29 | 16 | 120 | 71 |

*Red border colour indicates tournament was held on home soil.

South Africa's Africa Cup of Nations record
| First Match | South Africa 3–0 Cameroon (13 January 1996; Johannesburg, South Africa) |
| Biggest Win | South Africa 4–0 Namibia (21 January 2024; Korhogo, Ivory Coast) |
| Biggest Defeat | Nigeria 4–0 South Africa (31 January 2004; Monastir, Tunisia) |
| Best Result | Champions in 1996 |
| Worst Result | Group stage in (2004, 2006, 2008 and 2015) |

== Head-to-head record ==
As of 17 November 2026 after match against Kenya

| Opponent | GP | W | D | L | GF | GA | GD | win % |
|---|---|---|---|---|---|---|---|---|
| Algeria | 5 | 1 | 3 | 1 | 4 | 5 | −1 | 25 |
| Andorra | 1 | 0 | 1 | 0 | 1 | 1 | 0 | 0 |
| Angola | 14 | 8 | 6 | 0 | 18 | 8 | +10 | 57.14 |
| Argentina | 3 | 1 | 1 | 1 | 2 | 3 | −1 | 33.33 |
| Australia | 21 | 11 | 4 | 6 | 47 | 27 | +20 | 52.38 |
| Benin | 3 | 3 | 0 | 0 | 6 | 1 | +5 | 100 |
| Bolivia | 1 | 0 | 0 | 1 | 0 | 1 | −1 | 0 |
| Botswana | 5 | 4 | 1 | 0 | 10 | 3 | +7 | 80 |
| Brazil | 5 | 0 | 0 | 5 | 3 | 12 | −9 | 0 |
| Bulgaria | 1 | 0 | 1 | 0 | 1 | 1 | 0 | 0 |
| Burkina Faso | 9 | 5 | 3 | 1 | 14 | 6 | +8 | 55.56 |
| Burundi | 2 | 2 | 0 | 0 | 4 | 0 | +4 | 100 |
| Cameroon | 10 | 3 | 5 | 2 | 15 | 12 | +3 | 30 |
| Canada | 2 | 1 | 0 | 1 | 2 | 1 | +1 | 50 |
| Cape Verde | 6 | 2 | 2 | 2 | 6 | 6 | 0 | 33.33 |
| Central African Republic | 2 | 2 | 0 | 0 | 5 | 0 | +5 | 100 |
| Chad | 2 | 2 | 0 | 0 | 7 | 0 | +7 | 100 |
| Chile | 1 | 0 | 0 | 1 | 0 | 2 | −2 | 0 |
| Colombia | 1 | 1 | 0 | 0 | 2 | 1 | +1 | 100 |
| Congo | 12 | 6 | 5 | 1 | 14 | 5 | +9 | 50 |
| Comoros | 3 | 2 | 1 | 0 | 4 | 1 | +3 | 66.67 |
| Costa Rica | 2 | 2 | 0 | 0 | 3 | 1 | +2 | 100 |
| Czech Republic | 2 | 0 | 2 | 0 | 3 | 3 | 0 | 0 |
| Denmark | 3 | 1 | 2 | 0 | 3 | 2 | +1 | 33.33 |
| DR Congo (Note: Includes matches against Zaire.) | 8 | 5 | 2 | 1 | 9 | 5 | +4 | 62.5 |
| Ecuador | 1 | 0 | 1 | 0 | 0 | 0 | 0 | 0 |
| Egypt | 14 | 8 | 1 | 5 | 12 | 9 | +3 | 57.14 |
| England | 2 | 0 | 0 | 2 | 2 | 4 | −2 | 0 |
| Equatorial Guinea | 3 | 2 | 1 | 0 | 5 | 1 | +4 | 66.67 |
| Eritrea | 1 | 1 | 0 | 0 | 5 | 0 | +5 | 100 |
| Eswatini | 4 | 2 | 2 | 0 | 7 | 2 | +5 | 50 |
| Ethiopia | 4 | 2 | 1 | 1 | 6 | 4 | +2 | 50 |
| France | 5 | 1 | 1 | 3 | 3 | 11 | −8 | 20 |
| Gabon | 4 | 3 | 0 | 1 | 10 | 3 | +7 | 75 |
| Gambia | 2 | 1 | 1 | 0 | 4 | 0 | +4 | 50 |
| Georgia | 1 | 0 | 0 | 1 | 1 | 4 | −3 | 0 |
| Germany | 4 | 0 | 1 | 3 | 2 | 9 | −7 | 0 |
| Ghana | 15 | 5 | 5 | 5 | 13 | 13 | 0 | 33.33 |
| Ghana A | 1 | 1 | 0 | 0 | 1 | 0 | +1 | 100 |
| Guatemala | 2 | 1 | 1 | 0 | 6 | 1 | +5 | 50 |
| Guinea | 4 | 1 | 1 | 2 | 2 | 4 | −2 | 25 |
| Guinea-Bissau | 1 | 1 | 0 | 0 | 3 | 1 | +2 | 100 |
| Honduras | 1 | 0 | 1 | 0 | 1 | 1 | 0 | 0 |
| Iceland | 3 | 0 | 1 | 2 | 2 | 6 | −4 | 0 |
| Iraq | 1 | 0 | 1 | 0 | 0 | 0 | 0 | 0 |
| Israel | 1 | 1 | 0 | 0 | 2 | 1 | +1 | 100 |
| Italy | 2 | 0 | 0 | 2 | 0 | 3 | −3 | 0 |
| Ivory Coast | 8 | 2 | 5 | 1 | 7 | 5 | +2 | 25 |
| Jamaica | 6 | 1 | 5 | 0 | 7 | 5 | +2 | 16.67 |
| Japan | 1 | 0 | 1 | 0 | 0 | 0 | 0 | 0 |
| Kenya | 6 | 4 | 2 | 0 | 10 | 5 | +5 | 66.67 |
| Lesotho | 11 | 7 | 4 | 0 | 17 | 2 | +15 | 63.64 |
| Liberia | 4 | 2 | 2 | 0 | 7 | 5 | +2 | 50 |
| Libya | 2 | 1 | 1 | 0 | 2 | 1 | +1 | 50 |
| Madagascar | 4 | 4 | 0 | 0 | 5 | 0 | +5 | 100 |
| Malawi | 14 | 9 | 4 | 1 | 20 | 5 | +15 | 64.28 |
| Mali | 5 | 2 | 1 | 2 | 6 | 6 | 0 | 40 |
| Malta | 1 | 1 | 0 | 0 | 1 | 0 | +1 | 100 |
| Mauritania | 2 | 0 | 1 | 1 | 2 | 4 | −2 | 0 |
| Mauritius | 7 | 4 | 3 | 0 | 11 | 3 | +8 | 57.14 |
| Mexico | 5 | 1 | 1 | 3 | 5 | 12 | −7 | 20 |
| Morocco | 9 | 4 | 3 | 2 | 14 | 10 | +4 | 44.44 |
| Mozambique | 6 | 5 | 1 | 0 | 12 | 4 | +8 | 83.33 |
| Namibia | 7 | 4 | 3 | 0 | 12 | 3 | +9 | 57.14 |
| Netherlands | 2 | 0 | 0 | 2 | 1 | 4 | −3 | 0 |
| New Zealand | 6 | 5 | 1 | 0 | 26 | 9 | +17 | 83.33 |
| Nicaragua | 1 | 0 | 1 | 0 | 0 | 0 | 0 | 0 |
| Niger | 2 | 1 | 0 | 1 | 3 | 2 | +1 | 50 |
| Nigeria | 17 | 2 | 8 | 7 | 12 | 25 | −13 | 11.76 |
| North Korea | 1 | 0 | 1 | 0 | 0 | 0 | 0 | 0 |
| Northern Ireland | 1 | 0 | 0 | 1 | 1 | 2 | −1 | 0 |
| Norway | 3 | 1 | 0 | 2 | 2 | 3 | −1 | 33.33 |
| Panama | 3 | 0 | 2 | 1 | 3 | 4 | –1 | 0 |
| Paraguay | 4 | 1 | 3 | 0 | 7 | 4 | +3 | 25 |
| Poland | 2 | 1 | 0 | 1 | 1 | 1 | 0 | 50 |
| Portugal | 2 | 0 | 0 | 2 | 1 | 5 | −4 | 0 |
| Republic of Ireland | 2 | 0 | 0 | 2 | 1 | 3 | −2 | 0 |
| Rwanda | 2 | 1 | 0 | 1 | 3 | 2 | +1 | 50 |
| Saudi Arabia | 4 | 1 | 2 | 1 | 3 | 3 | 0 | 25 |
| Scotland | 2 | 1 | 0 | 1 | 2 | 1 | +1 | 50 |
| Senegal | 10 | 2 | 4 | 4 | 10 | 13 | −3 | 20 |
| Serbia | 1 | 0 | 0 | 1 | 1 | 3 | −2 | 0 |
| Seychelles | 3 | 2 | 1 | 0 | 9 | 0 | +9 | 66.67 |
| Sierra Leone | 5 | 1 | 3 | 1 | 4 | 1 | +3 | 20 |
| South Korea | 1 | 1 | 0 | 0 | 1 | 0 | +1 | 100 |
| Slovenia | 1 | 1 | 0 | 0 | 1 | 0 | +1 | 100 |
| São Tomé and Príncipe | 2 | 2 | 0 | 0 | 6 | 2 | +4 | 100 |
| South Sudan | 2 | 2 | 0 | 0 | 6 | 2 | +4 | 100 |
| Spain | 4 | 1 | 0 | 3 | 5 | 8 | −3 | 25 |
| Sudan | 4 | 3 | 0 | 1 | 6 | 1 | +5 | 75 |
| Sweden | 2 | 1 | 0 | 1 | 1 | 3 | −2 | 50 |
| Tanzania | 3 | 1 | 2 | 0 | 2 | 1 | +1 | 33.33 |
| Thailand | 1 | 1 | 0 | 0 | 4 | 0 | +4 | 100 |
| Trinidad and Tobago | 2 | 1 | 0 | 1 | 2 | 3 | −1 | 50 |
| Tunisia | 7 | 2 | 2 | 3 | 7 | 9 | −2 | 28.57 |
| Turkey | 1 | 1 | 0 | 0 | 2 | 0 | +2 | 100 |
| Uganda | 5 | 4 | 1 | 0 | 10 | 5 | +5 | 80 |
| United Arab Emirates | 1 | 0 | 0 | 1 | 0 | 1 | −1 | 0 |
| Uruguay | 3 | 0 | 1 | 2 | 3 | 7 | −4 | 0 |
| United States | 3 | 0 | 0 | 3 | 0 | 6 | −6 | 0 |
| Zambia | 19 | 7 | 5 | 7 | 21 | 20 | +1 | 36.84 |
| Zimbabwe | 16 | 9 | 3 | 4 | 23 | 14 | +9 | 56.25 |
| Total | 448 | 199 | 135 | 114 | 598 | 421 | +177 | 44.42 |

=== By Federation ===
| Name | Pld | Win | Draw | Loss | GF | GA | GD | Win% |
|---|---|---|---|---|---|---|---|---|
| AFC | 31 | 14 | 9 | 8 | 55 | 31 | +24 | 45.16 |
| CAF | 315 | 158 | 99 | 58 | 430 | 239 | +191 | 50.16 |
| CONCACAF | 27 | 7 | 11 | 9 | 29 | 34 | −5 | 25.93 |
| CONMEBOL | 19 | 3 | 6 | 10 | 17 | 30 | −13 | 15.79 |
| OFC | 6 | 5 | 1 | 0 | 26 | 9 | +17 | 83.33 |
| UEFA | 49 | 11 | 9 | 29 | 40 | 78 | −38 | 22.45 |
| Total | 447 | 198 | 135 | 114 | 597 | 421 | +176 | 44.30 |

== Honours ==
=== Intercontinental ===
- Afro-Asian Cup of Nations
  - (gold) Champions (1): 1997

=== Continental ===
- CAF African Cup of Nations
  - Champions (1): 1996
  - Runners-up (1): 1998
  - Third place (2): 2000, 2023

=== Regional ===
- COSAFA Cup
  - (gold) Champions (5): 2002, 2007, 2008, 2016, 2021
  - (silver) Runners-up (1) : 2025
  - (bronze) Third place (4): 2013, 2023

=== Friendly ===
- Four Nations Tournament (1): 2018

=== Awards ===
- FIFA Best Mover of the Year (1): 1996
- African National Team of the Year (1): 1996
- FIFA Confederations Cup Fair Play Award (1): 1997
- Africa Cup of Nations Fair Play Award (1): 2023

=== Summary ===
| Competition | 1st place, gold medalist(s) | 2nd place, silver medalist(s) | 3rd place, bronze medalist(s) | Total |
|---|---|---|---|---|
| CAF African Cup of Nations | 1 | 1 | 2 | 4 |
| Afro-Asian Cup of Nations | 1 | 0 | 0 | 1 |
| Total | 2 | 1 | 2 | 5 |
