= Dylan Kerr =

Maltese footballer and manager (born 1967)

Personal information
- Full name: Dylan Kerr
- Date of birth: 14 January 1967 (age 59)
- Place of birth: Valletta, Malta
- Height: 5 ft 11 in (1.80 m)
- Position: Left-back

Senior career*
| Years | Team | Apps | (Gls) |
| 1984–1988 | Sheffield Wednesday | 0 | (0) |
| 1988–1989 | Arcadia Shepherds | | |
| 1989–1993 | Leeds United | 20 | (0) |
| 1991 | → Doncaster Rovers (loan) | 7 | (1) |
| 1991 | → Blackpool (loan) | 13 | (1) |
| 1993–1996 | Reading | 104 | (5) |
| 1996 | Carlisle United | 1 | (0) |
| 1996–2000 | Kilmarnock | 67 | (0) |
| 2000 | Slough Town | 10 | (1) |
| 2000 | Kidderminster Harriers | 1 | (0) |
| 2001 | Hamilton Academical | 17 | (3) |
| 2001 | Exeter City | 6 | (1) |
| 2001–2002 | Greenock Morton | 23 | (2) |
| 2002 | East Stirlingshire | 1 | (2) |
| 2002 | Harrogate Town | 23 | (2) |
| 2002 | Gateshead | 3 | (0) |
| 2003 | Hamilton Academical | 17 | (0) |
| 2003 | Kilwinning Rangers | | |

Managerial career
- 2013–2014: Hải Phòng
- 2015–2016: Simba
- 2017–2018: Gor Mahia
- 2018–2019: Black Leopards
- 2020: Baroka
- 2020–2021: Black Leopards
- 2021: Tshakhuma Tsha Madzivhandila
- 2021–2022: Moroka Swallows
- 2022: Warriors
- 2023: Marumo Gallants
- 2024: Marumo Gallants
- * Club domestic league appearances and goals

Dylan Kerr (born 14 January 1967) is a Maltese-born English football manager and former professional footballer who is currently technical director of Vietnamese club Hải Phòng.

His playing career began with Sheffield Wednesday in 1984. He moved to South African club Arcadia Shepherds in 1988. The following year, he joined Leeds United and made his Football League debut. After a couple of loan moves, in 1993 he joined Reading, where he made more than 100 league appearances. He had a brief spell at Carlisle United, before moving to Scottish club Kilmarnock.

He finished his career with Kilwinning Rangers.

In 2013, he moved into management with Vietnamese club Hải Phòng. He has managed a number of clubs in Vietnam, Kenya and South Africa.

== Playing career ==
=== Leeds United ===
A left-back, Kerr began his playing career with Sheffield Wednesday.

After gaining playing experience in South Africa with Arcadia Shepherds, he returned to the UK and joined Leeds United in 1989.

He made a number of appearances in the Leeds United first team as they won the Division 2 and Division 1 titles.

=== Reading ===
Kerr joined Reading in the summer of 1993 and won the player of the season award in his first season, as Reading won the Division 2 title.

He was part of the Reading side that finished second in Division 1 the following season but missed out on automatic promotion to the Premier League, as the division was being restructured.

Reading reached the 1995 Division 1 play-off final, but Kerr was not included in the match day squad. Reading lost 4-3 after extra-time against Bolton Wanderers.

=== Kilmarnock and Hamilton Academical ===
Kerr left Reading in 1996 to join Kilmarnock and won the 1996-97 Scottish Cup with them.

After a spell with Slough Town, he signed for Hamilton Academical in January 2001 and won the SFL Division 3 title.

=== Greenock Morton ===
After a brief spell with Exeter City, Kerr returned to Scotland and spent the 2001–02 season at Greenock Morton.

=== Return to Hamilton Academical ===
Kerr had spells with Harrogate Town and Gateshead before returning to Hamilton Academical in 2003. He finished his playing career with Kilwinning Rangers.

== Coaching and management career ==
Kerr has won two league titles and five cup competitions since 2014 as a head coach in Vietnam, Tanzania, Kenya and South Africa and has helped four South African Premier Division clubs avoid relegation after taking charge with the club in danger of being relegated. He guided Marumo Gallants to the 2022–23 CAF Confederation Cup semi-finals.

=== Introduction to coaching ===
After retiring as a player, Kerr coached in Phoenix, Arizona, then returned to Scotland and worked as Argyll and Bute Council's Football Development Officer between 2005 and 2009. Kerr also worked for the Football Associations of England, Scotland and Northern Ireland and qualified for various UEFA badges.

=== Coaching roles in South Africa and Vietnam ===
In September 2009, Kerr joined South African club Mpumalanga Black Aces as assistant manager.

In 2011, he was appointed as academy director and assistant coach at Khatoco in V.League 1, the top division in Vietnam. Kerr followed the franchise when it was sold to Hải Phòng. He assisted the head coach and was head of development for the younger players.

In 2012 Kerr was involved with the Vietnamese national team for the AFF Championship, assisting the technical bench and heading the fitness programme.

=== Hải Phòng ===
In 2013 Kerr became head coach of Hải Phòng, leading them to success in the Vietnam National Cup in his first season.

=== Burton Albion, Simba and return to UK ===
In 2015, Kerr was Burton Albion Academy's Under-18s head coach, before joining Tanzanian Premier League club Simba as head coach. He guided the team into the top three in the league.

In 2016, he returned to the UK and was appointed as the Under-18s academy coach at Chesterfield.

=== Gor Mahia ===
In July 2017, Kerr was confirmed as head coach of Gor Mahia.

He won the Kenyan Premier League manager of the month award in September 2017 on his way to winning the league title in his first season. He won the Kenyan Premier League coach of the month award again in June 2018.

Kerr completed a trophy treble in 2018, winning the Kenyan Premier League, Kenyan Super Cup and SportPesa Super Cup, as well as securing qualification for the 2018 CAF Confederation Cup group stages.

=== Black Leopards ===
In November 2018, Kerr was appointed as manager of Black Leopards in the South African Premier Division.

He won the coach of the month award in January 2019, becoming the first Leopards coach in 10 years to win the accolade, and helped Leopards avoid relegation.

=== Baroka ===
In January 2020, Kerr was appointed as the head coach of Baroka.

Kerr kept Baroka in the South African Premier Division, but Baroka suspended him in November 2020 for what the club described as 'undermining the chairman and owner in a post-match press conference'. With three years remaining on his contract, Kerr decided to take legal action for unfair dismissal and won his case.

=== Black Leopards return and cup success with TTM ===
He returned to Black Leopards in November 2020, then was appointed head coach at Tshakhuma Tsha Madzivhandila in February 2021 and won the Nedbank Cup during his time in charge.

=== Moroka Swallows and Warriors cup success ===
In November 2021, Kerr was appointed as the head coach of Moroka Swallows with Swallows in the South African Premier Division relegation zone.

He guided Swallows to safety via the play-offs, but his contract was not renewed and he left the club in September 2022.

During his time as Swallows manager, Kerr was appointed as manager of the Warriors side for the DStv Compact Cup, a mid-season competition featuring players from PSL teams representing different regions in South Africa. Warriors lifted the trophy after a win against Coastal United at the FNB Stadium in Johannesburg on 29 January 2022.

=== Marumo Gallants ===
In January 2023, Kerr was appointed as acting head coach for South African Premier Division club Marumo Gallants with the club at the bottom of the division and on a run of eight games without a win, having won just two PSL games all season.

Following Kerr's appointment, Gallants won their next four games and went on an unbeaten eight game PSL run. He also guided them to the semi-finals of the CAF Confederation Cup.

Gallants players refused to train the day before the semi-final second leg, in protest at what they felt were derisory bonuses offered by chairman Abram Sello for reaching the final.

Gallants were relegated on the final day of the season. Kerr had previously had a 100% record of taking over at four relegation-threatened PSL clubs and keeping them all up.

Reacting to the team's relegation on the "1871" podcast, Kerr says the players had let themselves and the club down for refusing to train in the run up to the final game over a dispute about bonuses. He believes the dispute was a contributing factor in the side's relegation.

Following relegation, it was announced that Kerr would be leaving Gallants. He spent his entire time working for Gallants without having a work permit approved, meaning he had to sit in the stands for all of the side's games.

=== Brief return to Marumo Gallants ===
On 9 July 2024, it was announced that Kerr had been reappointed as manager of Marumo Gallants, after the club purchased PSL status from Kerr's former club Moroka Swallows.

Kerr resigned after only three weeks in the role following the club's decision to appoint a co-coach. He said: "I didn't feel it was the right move for me to go in the direction that they wanted and I said, 'Chairman, I think we just need to go our ways separately.' And that was it."

=== Return to the USA ===
On 28 January 2025, Kerr was announced as a coach for Soccer Stars United in New York.

=== Return to Vietnam ===
In November 2026, Kerr was announced as technical director of his former club Hải Phòng in Vietnam.

== Personal life ==
Kerr was born in Valletta, Malta, but grew up in Mexborough, England.

He was exposed to animist practices as part of an initiation ceremony when he joined South African club Arcadia Shepherds in 1988 as a 21-year-old. He revealed that he stood in a bath, naked apart from his football boots, as the heads were cut off three live chickens and their blood was poured on him.

Kerr says he is lucky to be alive after he was involved in a car accident during his time as a player at Reading. He was driving and had a passenger in the car. Recalling the incident during a Q&A conversation with Reading fans on the "1871" podcast in June 2022, he said: "A car came up and I lost control and I hit the car. Luckily I didn't hit it head on - if I'd hit it head on we'd have both been dead."

Kerr was married in 1995 at the age of 28, but the marriage ended within a year.

In September 2022, Kerr was inducted into the Reading F.C. Hall of Fame.

On 26 December 2022, he was robbed at gunpoint in Durban, South Africa.

== Media work ==
Kerr was a pundit for South African broadcaster SuperSports' Euro 2020 coverage in 2021.

He is a co-host of the "1871" podcast, a podcast for Reading F.C. fans.

== Honours ==
=== As a player ===
Sheffield Wednesday

- Football League Second Division promotion: 1983–84

Arcadia Shepherds

- BP Cup: 1986–87

Leeds United

- Football League First Division: 1991–92
- Football League Second Division: 1989–90

Reading

- Football League Second Division: 1993–94
- Football League First Division runner-up: 1994–95

Kilmarnock

- Scottish Cup: 1996–97

Hamilton Academical

- Scottish Football League Third Division: 2000–01

Individual

- PFA Team of the Year: 1993–94 Second Division
- Reading Player of the Season: 1993–94
- Reading Hall of Fame inductee

=== As a manager ===
Hải Phòng

- Vietnam National Cup: 2013–14

Gor Mahia

- Kenyan Premier League: 2017, 2018
- Kenyan Super Cup: 2018
- SportPesa Super Cup: SportPesa Super Cup: 2018

Tshakhuma Tsha Madzivhandila

- Nedbank Cup: 2020–21

Warriors

- DStv Compact Cup: 2022

Individual

- Kenyan Premier League Coach of the Month: September 2017, June 2018
- South African Premier Division Manager of the Month: January 2019
