= 2025 MTN 8 =

2026 MTN 8
Tournament details
- Date: 2 August 2025 – 13 September 2025
- Teams: 8

Final positions
- Champions: Mamelodi Sundowns FC
- Runners-up: Orlando Pirates FC

Tournament statistics
- Matches played: 9
- Goals scored: 27 (3 per match)
- Top goal scorer: Iqraam Rayners (3 goals)
- All statistics correct as of 13 September 2025.

The 2025 MTN 8 was the 51st edition of the South African soccer competition featuring the top 8-placed teams at the conclusion of the previous Premiership season, and the 18th under its current sponsored name. The competition started on 2 August 2025 and concluded on 13 September 2025.

Prize money was R10 million for the winners and R1 million each for the other 7 participants. Orlando Pirates were defending champions. They won their fourth consecutive MTN 8 title and five in six seasons after defeating Stellenbosch 3–0 in extra time in a repeat of the 2024 MTN 8 final at Mbombela Stadium, Mpumalanga. It was Orlando Pirates 14th MTN 8 title overall placing them 1 behind their arch rivals Kaizer Chiefs.

Tshepang Moremi was named Man of the match after scoring a brace and providing an assist in the final. Later, he won the MTN 8 Last man standing. Iqraam Rayners finished the competition as the top goal scorer with 3 goals.

== Teams ==
The following 8 teams are listed according to their final position on the league table in the previous season of the 2024-25 Premiership.

1. Mamelodi Sundowns
2. Orlando Pirates
3. Stellenbosch
4. Sekhukhune United
5. TS Galaxy
6. AmaZulu
7. Polokwane City
8. Richards Bay

== Bracket ==
Quarter-finals
Orlando Pirates	2
Polokwane City	0
Mamelodi Sundowns	4
Richards Bay	0
Sekhukhune United	3
TS Galaxy	2
Stellenbosch (a.e.t.)	3
AmaZulu	2

Semi-finals
Orlando Pirates (p)	1	1	2 (4)
Mamelodi Sundowns	1	1	2 (1)
Stellenbosch	2	1	3
Sekhukhune United	0	1	1

Final
Orlando Pirates (a.e.t.)	3
Stellenbosch	0

== Quarter-finals ==
The quarter-finals were played on 2 and 3 August.

2 August 2025	Orlando Pirates	2–0	Polokwane City	Soweto
15:00 SAST	Appollis 13'; Maswanganyi 35' (pen.)	Report		Stadium: Orlando Stadium

2 August 2025	Sekhukhune United	3–2	TS Galaxy	Polokwane
18:00 SAST	Grobler 43' 64'; Mncube 69'	Report	Mvelase 14'; Letsoalo 41'	Stadium: Peter Mokaba Stadium

3 August 2025	Stellenbosch	3–2 (a.e.t.)	AmaZulu	Cape Town
15:00 SAST	Barns 25' 69'; Phili 108'	Report	Allan 18'; Mashigo 73'	Stadium: Cape Town Stadium

3 August 2025	Mamelodi Sundowns	4–0	Richards Bay	Pretoria
18:00 SAST	Rayners 10' 54'; Mcineka 45+2'(O.G.); Mabena 76'	Report		Stadium: Lucas Moripe Stadium

== Semi-finals ==
1st leg

16 August 2025 1st Leg	Orlando Pirates	1–1	Mamelodi Sundowns	Soweto
15:00 SAST	Sebelebele 87'		Mokoena 36'	Stadium: Orlando Stadium

16 August 2025 1st Leg	Stellenbosch	2–0	Sekhukhune United	Stellenbosch
18:00 SAST	Godswill 23'; Titus 33'			Stadium: Danie Craven Stadium

2nd leg

23 August 2025 2nd Leg	Mamelodi Sundowns	1–1	Orlando Pirates	Pretoria
15:00 SAST	Rayners 17'	Report	Sebelebele 73'	Stadium: Lucas Masterpieces Moripe Stadium
	Penalties
	Mokoena (penalty missed); Allende (penalty missed); Mothiba (penalty scored)		(penalty scored) Hotto; (penalty scored) Mariko; (penalty scored) Mbule; (penalty scored) Mabasa

2–2 on aggregate; Orlando Pirates won 4–1 on penalties.

23 August 2025 2nd Leg	Sekhukhune United	1–1	Stellenbosch	Polokwane
18:00 SAST	Mkhize 66'	Report	Mthiyane 22'	Stadium: Peter Mokaba Stadium

Stellenbosch 3–1 won on aggregate

== Final ==
13 September 2025	Orlando Pirates	3–0 (a.e.t.)	Stellenbosch	Mbombela
18:00 SAST	Moremi 92', 110'; Mabasa 103'	Report		Stadium: Mbombela Stadium
