= SportPesa Super Cup =

The SportPesa Super Cup was an association football competition held in Tanzania and Kenya.

== Editions ==
- 2017 SportPesa Super Cup
- 2018 SportPesa Super Cup
