= Tshepang Moremi =

South African soccer player (born 2000)

Personal information
- Date of birth: 2 October 2000 (age 26)
- Place of birth: Sharpeville, Gauteng, South Africa
- Height: 1.69 m (5 ft 7 in)
- Position: Winger

Team information
- Current team: Orlando Pirates
- Number: 11

Youth career
- Sharpeville Benfica

Senior career*
Years	Team	Apps	(Gls)
2020–2021	Bizana Pondo Chiefs	15	(0)
2021–2025	AmaZulu	71	(6)
2022–2023	→ JDR Stars (loan)	29	(3)
2025–	Orlando Pirates	12	(2)

International career^{‡}
2024–	South Africa	13	(1)
- * Club domestic league appearances and goals as of 3 January 2026 ‡ National team caps and goals as of 29 June 2026

Tshepang Moremi (born 2 October 2000) is a South African soccer player who plays as a winger for Premier Soccer League club Orlando Pirates and the South Africa national team.

== Club career ==
Moremi was an academy player at Sharpeville Benfica. He joined AmaZulu after playing for the Bizana Pondo Chiefs. He made his debut in the 2021–22 South African Premier Division in August against Mamelodi Sundowns, and scored his first goal in December against Kaizer Chiefs. He spent the 2022–23 season on loan at JDR Stars. After he returned, he played all AmaZulu's games. In late 2023 and early 2024, rumours arose that South African giants Mamelodi Sundowns and Orlando Pirates were interested in Moremi. AmaZulu had the opportunity to place a high price tag on Moremi, should other clubs want to buy the player.

=== Orlando Pirates ===
In July 2025 he joined Premier Soccer League club Orlando Pirates. He scored a brace in extra time to help Pirates to a 3–0 win over Stellenbosch in the 2025 MTN 8.

== International career ==
In late 2023, Moremi was called up to Bafana Bafana by Hugo Broos as part of a 50-man preliminary squad for the 2023 Africa Cup of Nations. He was again in the preliminary squad for the 2024 FIFA Series. In 2024 he finally made his Bafana Bafana debut, coming on as a substitute in South Africa's first 2024 COSAFA Cup game.

On 1 December 2025, Moremi was called up to the South Africa squad for the 2025 Africa Cup of Nations.

On 28 May 2026, he was selected by manager Hugo Broos to represent his nation at the 2026 FIFA World Cup.

== Career statistics ==
=== International ===
As of match played 29 June 2026

Appearances and goals by national team and year
National team	Year	Apps	Goals
South Africa	2025	7	1
South Africa	2026	6	0
Total		13	1

As of match played 29 December 2025
South Africa score listed first, score column indicates score after each Kofane goal.

List of international goals scored by Tshepang Moremi
No.	Date	Venue	Opponent	Score	Result	Competition
1	29 December 2025	Marrakesh Stadium, Marrakesh, Morocco	Zimbabwe	1–0	3–2	2025 Africa Cup of Nations

== Honours ==
Orlando Pirates

- MTN 8: 2025
- Carling Black Label Cup: 2025
