= 2018 SportPesa Super Cup =

Tournament details
- Country: Kenya
- Dates: 3–10 June 2018
- Teams: 8

Final positions
- Champions: Everton
- Runners-up: Gor Mahia F.c.
- Third place: Singida United
- Fourth place: Kakamega Homeboyz

Tournament statistics
- Matches played: 8
- Goals scored: 11 (1.38 per match)
- Top goal scorer: Meddie Kagere

The SportPesa Super Cup is an annual football tournament created and sponsored by bookmakers SportPesa, which pits teams in East Africa against one another in one full week of high class football action.

== Overview ==
The first edition of the SportPesa SuperCup took place in June, 2017 at the Uhuru Stadium in Dar Es Salaam, Tanzania. The winner inaugural edition, Gor Mahia, played against English Premier League side Everton at the National Stadium in Dar Es Salaam

The second edition of the regional football tourney pitting East Africa’s finest teams took place on June 3–10, 2018. Eight teams, four from Kenya and four from Tanzania, participated in this year's edition. The winning team will earn a chance to travel to the UK in July for a face-off with English Premier League club, Everton FC at Goodison Park.

The tournament intended to bring about enhanced cohesion within the region as well as showcase the best in East African football. As a unique franchise, the Super Cup further served as a uniting initiative between football fans across the region and to some extent the continent as well. It is intended to raise the profile of African football and what it represents, a sense of pride for people who partake in it.

== Participants ==
The teams that participated in the 2018 SportPesa SuperCup edition were:

- (Kenya) - Gor Mahia F.C.
- (Kenya) - AFC Leopards
- (Kenya) - Kariobangi Sharks
- (Kenya) - Kakamega Homeboyz
- (Tanzania) - Young Africans S.C.
- (Tanzania) - Simba S.C.
- (Tanzania) - Singida United F.C.
- (Zanzibar) - Jeshi la Kujenga Uchumi (JKU)

== Matches ==
Quarter-finals
3 June
(Kenya) Kakamega Homeboyz | 3
(Tanzania) Yanga | 1
4 June
(Kenya) Kariobangi Sharks | 0 (2)
(Tanzania) Simba | 0 (3)
3 June
(Kenya) Gor Mahia | 3
(Zanzibar) JKU | 0
5 June
(Kenya) AFC Leopards | 0 (2)
(Tanzania) Singida United | 0 (4)

Semi-finals
7 June
Kakamega Homeboyz | 0 (4)
Simba | 0 (5)
7 June
Gor Mahia | 2
Singida United | 0

Final
10 June
Simba | 0
Gor Mahia | 2

== Results ==
3 June 2018
1300 EAT

| Kakamega Homeboyz (Kenya) | 3-1 | (Tanzania) Yanga |
|---|---|---|
| Allan Wanga 28'; Allan Wanga 31'; Wycliffe Opopndo 85' | | Simon Matheo 38' |

Afraha Stadium, Nakuru

3 June 2018
1515 EAT

| Gor Mahia (Kenya) | 3-0 | (Zanzibar) JKU |
|---|---|---|
| George 'Blackberry' Odhiambo 30'; Godfrey Walusimbi 36'; Meddie Kagere 81' |

Afraha Stadium, Nakuru

4 June 2018
1500 EAT

| Kariobangi Sharks (Kenya) | 0-0 | (Tanzania) Simba S.C. |
Penalties
| | 2-3 |

Afraha Stadium, Nakuru

5 June 2018
1515 EAT

| AFC Leopards (Kenya) | 0-0 | (Tanzania) Singida United |
Penalties
| | 2-4 |

Afraha Stadium, Nakuru

7 June 2018
1300 EAT

| Kakamega Homeboyz (Kenya) | 0-0 | (Tanzania) Simba S.C. |
Penalties
| | 4-5 |

Afraha Stadium, Nakuru

7 June 2018
1515 EAT

| Gor Mahia (Kenya) | 2-0 | (Tanzania) Singida United |
|---|---|---|
| Meddie Kagere 35'; Meddie Kagere 90' |

Afraha Stadium, Nakuru

10 June 2018
1200 EAT

| Kakamega Homeboyz (Kenya) | 1-1 | (Tanzania) Singida United |
|---|---|---|
| Wycliffe Opondo 03' | | Danny Lyanga 61' |
Penalties
| | 1-4 |

Afraha Stadium, Nakuru

10 June 2018
1500 EAT

| Simba S.C. (Tanzania) | 0-2 | (Kenya) Gor Mahia |
|---|---|---|
| | | Meddie Kagere 06'; Jacques Tuyisenge 55' |

Afraha Stadium, Nakuru

== Prize money ==
Winner: $30,000
Runner-up: $10,000
2nd Runner-Up: $7,500
Semi-finalists: $5,000
Quarter-finalists: $2,500
