= Meshack Maphangule =

South African footballer

Personal information
- Date of birth: 9 August 1991 (age 35)
- Height: 1.78 m (5 ft 10 in)
- Position: Forward

Senior career*
Years	Team	Apps	(Gls)
2012–2013	Dynamos	5	(0)
2013–2018	Black Leopards	75	(4)
2018–2020	Orlando Pirates	2	(0)
2019–2020	→ Chippa United (loan)	24	(1)
2020–2021	Marumo Gallants	12	(1)
2021	Pretoria Callies	13	(1)
2022–2023	Chippa United	6	(0)
- * Club domestic league appearances and goals as of 31 March 2023

Meshack Maphangule (born 9 August 1991) is a South African footballer.

== Career ==
In October 2022, he rejoined Chippa United on a deal until the end of the season. He was released in the summer of 2023.

== Personal life ==
He is the older brother of fellow footballer Ndamulelo Maphangule.
