= Keegan Allan =

South African soccer player (born 2001)

Personal information
- Full name: Keegan Shannon Saxin Allan
- Date of birth: 2 April 2001 (age 25)
- Place of birth: Roodepoort, South Africa
- Height: 1.85 m (6 ft 1 in)
- Position: Defender

Team information
- Current team: AmaZulu
- Number: 5

Youth career
- Mamelodi Sundowns

Senior career*
Years	Team	Apps	(Gls)
2021–2022	University of Pretoria	18	(3)
2022–2024	Moroka Swallows	28	(2)
2024	SuperSport United	9	(0)
2024–2025	Richards Bay	25	(1)
2025–	AmaZulu	25	(1)

International career^{‡}
- South Africa U20
2023–	South Africa	3	(0)
- * Club domestic league appearances and goals as of 4 January 2026 ‡ National team caps and goals as of 20 March 2024

Keegan Allan (born 2 April 2001) is a South African soccer player who plays as a defender for AmaZulu in the Premier Soccer League.

== Career ==
While player youth soccer for Mamelodi Sundowns he was also capped for South Africa U-20. Among others, he featured at a Tri-Nations tournament against Brazil and England. Allan was eventually offered a 5-year contract with the first team of Sundowns, but rejected the offer. Instead he started his senior career in the second tier with University of Pretoria, "AmaTuks".

In the 2021–22 Nedbank Cup, Allan was given the Most Improved Player award. His team reached the quarter-finals of the cup, but finished second in the league. He was sought after by several clubs, but after talking to Swallows manager Dylan Kerr, Allan was persuaded into joining that team. Allan reportedly favored playing time over the financial aspect of a transfer. The contract length was 2 years.

In April 2023, he went down after a duel, and two ambulances rushed onto the pitch to help him. Allan was stabilized and was able to leave the pitch.

Allan performed well in the 2022-23 South African Premier Division, being named by Soccer Laduma as "one of the top performers that year". The same outlet reported an interest from Orlando Pirates to buy Allan. Allan was called up for South Africa for the 2023 COSAFA Cup, where he made his international debut.

In January 2024 he joined SuperSport United. In the summer window of 2024 he moved on to Richards Bay, even scoring on his debut.

In July 2025, Allan joined AmaZulu F.C. ahead of the 2025-26 Premier Soccer League season. Allan quickly established himself as a regular starter in defence, making 25 league appearances during the campaign.

== Personal life ==
Allan proposed to marry his girlfriend Saige Fourie in July 2022. The marriage was held at the Casalinga Organic Farm in Muldersdrift in June 2023.
