= Molefi Ntseki =

South African football coach

Personal information
- Date of birth: 18 August 1969 (age 57)
- Place of birth: Botshabelo, South Africa

Managerial career
- Years: Team
- 2019: South Africa (caretaker)
- 2019–2021: South Africa
- 2023: Kaizer Chiefs
- 2025–2026: South Africa A

Molefi Ntseki (born 18 August 1969) is a South African football coach who is the technical director at SAFA.

== Career ==
After coaching various national youth teams he became interim manager of the South African senior national team in August 2019. He was appointed permanent manager later that month. In October 2019 he spoke of the need for consistency with the national team players. He was sacked on 31 March 2021.

In May 2021 he became Head of Technical and Youth Development Academy at Kaizer Chiefs. In June 2023 he became head coach of Kaizer Chiefs, before being sacked in October 2023.

In 2025 he led the South Africa A team to qualification for the 2024 African Nations Championship. He was later appointed the SAFA technical director.
