= Cemran Dansin =

South African footballer

Personal information
- Full name: Cemran Dansin
- Date of birth: 30 March 2005 (age 21)
- Place of birth: Newclare, South Africa
- Height: 1.77 m (5 ft 10 in)
- Position: Midfielder

Team information
- Current team: Orlando Pirates
- Number: 46

Youth career
- –2023: SAFA-Transnet School of Excellence
- 2023–2025: Orlando Pirates

Senior career*
Years	Team	Apps	(Gls)
2025–	Orlando Pirates	13	(1)

International career
2026–	South Africa U23	1	(0)
- * Club domestic league appearances and goals as of 22 August 2026

Cemran Dansin (born 30 March 2005), commonly known as Dancing Shoes, is a South African soccer player who plays as a midfielder for Betway Premiership club Orlando Pirates.

== Early life ==
Dansin was born in Newclare and attended the SAFA-Transnet School of Excellence.

== Club career ==
=== Orlando Pirates ===
Dansin joined the Orlando Pirates reserve side ahead of the 2023–24 season, captaining the side during the 2024–25 season.

He scored his first senior goal on 1 November 2025, a long-range strike against Mamelodi Sundowns at Loftus Versfeld Stadium, which won the Betway Premiership Goal of the Season award for 2025–26.

== Honours ==
Orlando Pirates

- Betway Premiership: 2025–26
- MTN 8: 2025
- Carling Knockout: 2025
- Betway Premiership Goal of the Season: 2025–26

== Career statistics ==
As of 22 August 2026

Appearances and goals by club, season and competition
Club	Season	League			Nedbank Cup		League Cup		CAF		Total		Ref
Club	Season	Division	Apps	Goals	Apps	Goals	Apps	Goals	Apps	Goals	Apps	Goals	Ref
Orlando Pirates	2024–25	Premiership	4	0	1	0	0	0	0	0	5	0	
Orlando Pirates	2025–26	Premiership	9	1	1	0	1						
