= Ndamulelo Maphangule =

South African soccer player (born 1999)

Personal information
- Full name: Ndamulelo Rodney Maphangule
- Date of birth: 22 October 1999 (age 27)
- Place of birth: Ha-Masakona, Limpopo, South Africa
- Height: 1.87 m (6 ft 2 in)
- Position: Midfielder

Team information
- Current team: Polokwane City
- Number: 14

Senior career*
Years	Team	Apps	(Gls)
2017–2018	Masakona United		
2018–2019	Black Leopards	0	(0)
2019–2020	Mbombela United	2	(0)
2020–2021	Venda FA		
2021–	Polokwane City	111	(1)

International career^{‡}
2025–	South Africa	3	(0)
- * Club domestic league appearances and goals as of 15:25, 1 October 2025 (UTC) ‡ National team caps and goals as of 15:25, 1 October 2025 (UTC)

Ndamulelo Rodney Maphangule (born 22 October 1999) is a South African professional soccer player who plays as a midfielder for South African Premier Division club Polokwane City, and the South Africa national team.

== Club career ==
Maphangule was born in Ha-Masakona in Limpopo, South Africa, and began his playing career at local team Masakona United before joining Black Leopards and playing for their reserve team in the PSL Reserve League. He was later scouted by Mbombela United of the National First Division and had a spell with Venda FA before signing for Polokwane City in 2021.

Maphangule was part of the Polokwane City team who won the National First Division on goal difference in 2022–23, and were thus promoted to the South African Premier Division.

== International career ==
In November 2024, Maphangule was selected to a preliminary 38-man squad for the South Africa national team for 2025 Africa Cup of Nations qualification matches, but did not make the final squad, though he was called up to the final squad for a 2026 FIFA World Cup qualification fixture against Lesotho in March 2025, as a replacement for the injured Patrick Maswanganyi. He made his international debut as a late substitute in this match, as South Africa won 2–0.

== Personal life ==
Maphangule is the younger brother of fellow footballer Meshack Maphangule.
