= 2017 SportPesa Super Cup =

Tournament details
- Country: Tanzania, Kenya
- Dates: 5–11 June 2017
- Teams: 8

Final positions
- Champions: Gor Mahia
- Runners-up: AFC Leopards

The SportPesa Super Cup is an association football competition that took place in June 2017 in Dar es Salaam, Tanzania.

The competition was created and sponsored by bookmakers SportPesa.

All matches took place at Uhuru Stadium.

== Overview ==
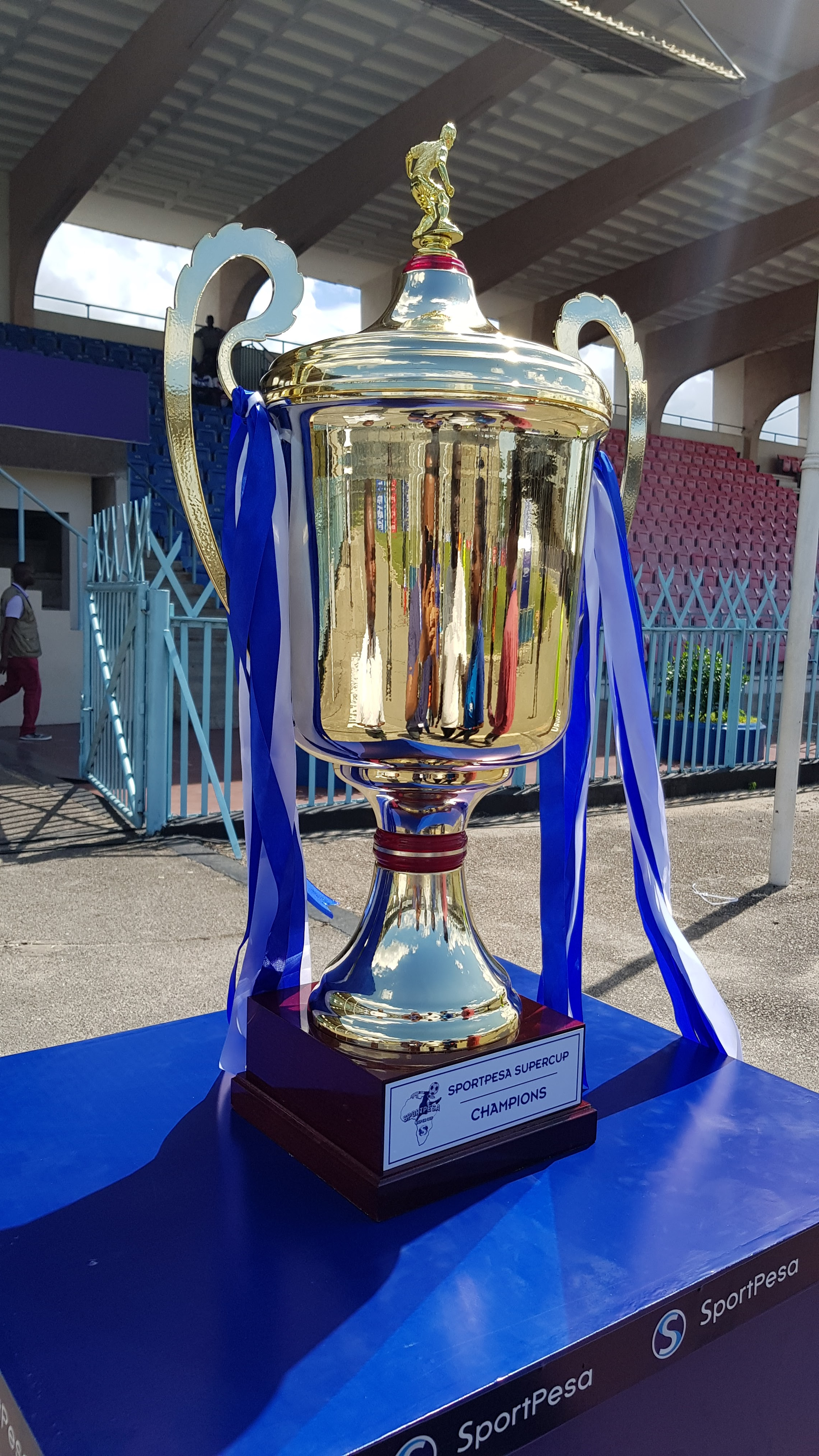
Sportpesa Super Cup Trophy

The 2017 SportPesa Super Cup was the inaugural edition of an eight-team knockout tournament featuring four teams each from Kenya and Tanzania created and sponsored by bookmakers SportPesa.

SportsPesa sponsored six of the participating teams, Gor Mahia FC, AFC Leopards SC and Nakuru AllStars FC from Kenya and Yanga SC, Simba SC and Singida United FC from Tanzania. Tusker FC (Kenya) and Jang’ombe Boys SC (Zanzibar) were selected to join them in the competition.

The tournament started at the quarterfinal stage with penalties separating the teams in case of a draw at regulation time. The quarter final draw pit Leopards vs Singida, Yanga vs Tusker, Gor vs Jang'ombe and Simba vs AllStars.

=== Everton FC ===
The winner of the 2017 SportPesa Super Cup also got a chance to play against the English Premier League giants, Everton FC, on 13 July 2017. During Everton's first visit to East Africa, they played tournament winner Gor Mahia as part of their agreement with bookmaker SportPesa to develop football in East Africa.

== Participants ==
Kenya

- (Kenya) Gor Mahia F.C.[Mayienga]
- (Kenya) A.F.C. Leopards
- (Kenya) Tusker FC
- (Kenya) Nakuru AllStars

Tanzania

- (Tanzania) Young Africans S.C.
- (Tanzania) Simba S.C.
- (Tanzania) Singida United

Zanzibar

- (Zanzibar) Jang'ombe Boys F.C.

== Matches ==
Quarter-finals
5 June
(Kenya) A.F.C. Leopards	1 (5)
(Tanzania) Singida United	1 (4)
5 June
(Kenya) Tusker F.C.	0 (2)
(Tanzania) Young Africans S.C.	0 (4)
6 June
(Kenya) Gor Mahia F.C.	2
(Zanzibar) Jang'ombe Boys F.C.	0
6 June
(Tanzania) Simba S.C.	0 (4)
(Kenya) Nakuru AllStars	0 (5)

Semi-finals
8 June
(Kenya) A.F.C. Leopards	0 (4)
(Tanzania) Young Africans S.C.	0 (2)
8 June
(Kenya) Gor Mahia F.C.	2
(Kenya) Nakuru AllStars	0

Final
11 June
(Kenya) A.F.C. Leopards	0
(Kenya) Gor Mahia F.C.	3

=== Quarter-finals ===
5 June 2017
1400 EAT

A.F.C. Leopards (Kenya)	1-1	(Tanzania) Singida United
Vincent Oburu 63'		Tafadzwa Kutinyu 10'
Penalties
	5-4

Uhuru stadium, Dar es Salaam

5 June 2017
1615 EAT

Tusker F.C. (Kenya)	0-0	(Tanzania) Young Africans S.C.
Penalties
	2-4

Uhuru stadium, Dar es Salaam

6 June 2017
1615 EAT

Simba S.C. (Tanzania)	0-0	(Kenya) Nakuru AllStars
Penalties
	4-5

Uhuru stadium, Dar es Salaam

6 June 2017
1400 EAT

Gor Mahia F.C. (Kenya)	2-0	(Zanzibar) Jang'ombe Boys F.C.
Meddie Kagere 64'; Meddie Kagere 85'

Uhuru stadium, Dar es Salaam

=== Semi-finals ===
8 June 2017
1400 EAT

A.F.C. Leopards (Kenya)	0-0	(Tanzania) Young Africans S.C.
Penalties
	4-2

Uhuru stadium, Dar es Salaam

8 June 2017
1615 EAT

Gor Mahia F.C. (Kenya)	2-0	(Kenya) Nakuru AllStars
Meddie Kagere 45'; George Odhiambo 82'

Uhuru stadium, Dar es Salaam

=== Final ===
11 June 2017

A.F.C. Leopards (Kenya)	0-3	Gor Mahia F.C. (Kenya)
Timothy Otieno 60'; Oliver Maloba 78'; John Ndirangu 90+'

Uhuru stadium, Dar es Salaam

== Prize money ==
- Winner: $30,000
- Runner-up: $10,000
- Semi-finalists: $5,000
- Quarter-finalists: $2,500
