= Mthetheleli Mthiyane =

South African soccer player (born 2001)

Personal information
- Full name: Mthetheleli Mthiyane
- Date of birth: 21 January 2001 (age 25)
- Place of birth: South Africa
- Position: Central midfielder

Team information
- Current team: Orlando Pirates
- Number: 29

Senior career*
Years	Team	Apps	(Gls)
2023–2025	Milford	25	(2)
2025–2026	Stellenbosch	25	(0)
2026–	Orlando Pirates	5	(0)
- * Club domestic league appearances and goals as of 22 October 2026

Mthetheleli Mthiyane (born 21 January 2001) is a South African professional soccer player who plays as a midfielder for South African Premiership club Orlando Pirates.

== Club career ==
=== Milford FC ===
Mthiyane started his career at Milford FC in the Motsepe Foundation Championship. Here, he made 25 appearances and scored 2 goals between 2023 and 2025.

=== Stellenbosch ===
On 31 July 2025, Mthiyane joined Stellenbosch in the South African Premiership. He made 38 appearances in all competitions in the 2025–26 season.

=== Orlando Pirates ===
On 1 July 2026, Mthiyane joined Orlando Pirates on a free transfer. He made his debut on 16 August 2026 in a 3–0 win against Chippa United.

== International career ==
Mthiyane was first called up to the South Africa national team in November 2025 for the preliminary squad for the 2025 African Cup of Nations.
