= SportPesa =

Overview of the SportPesa brand and activities

- Type: Private
- Industry: Online Gambling
- Founded: 2014; 12 years ago
- Headquarters: Liverpool
- Area served: Global
- Products: Sports Betting, Jackpot, Casino, Virtuals, E-Sports Betting
- Services: Sports betting
- Number of employees: 305
- Website: SportPesa.org

SportPesa is an online gambling company founded in 2014. It offers online gambling products such as sportsbooks, live betting and online casino. SportPesa has offices in Kenya, Tanzania, South Africa, the Isle of Man, and the UK.

== Ownership ==
In each market, the SportPesa brand is operated by fully licensed locally registered companies. These licensed operators are responsible for their own management and regulatory compliance in accordance with the licensing objectives in each respective jurisdiction.

== Products ==
The company's affiliated companies provide sports betting, live betting, and casino games such as Aviator. All these are provided online via the internet, played via a mobile phone, desktop, or tablet.

=== Sports Betting ===
Online sports betting is the primary business at SportPesa. Customers can play over 80 games from different sports to win jackpots and jackpot bonuses. The core game of the customers is football. The other sports online bookmarkers play include basketball, tennis, rugby, ice hockey, volleyball, handball, cricket, baseball, MMA, boxing, and American football betting.

=== Casino games ===
SportPesa offers more than 800+ games. These include Drops & Wins, Aviator or crush games, roulette, tables, scratch, fruits, Bingo & Keno, slot machines, live casino, video poker, and virtual games.

== Sports involvement ==
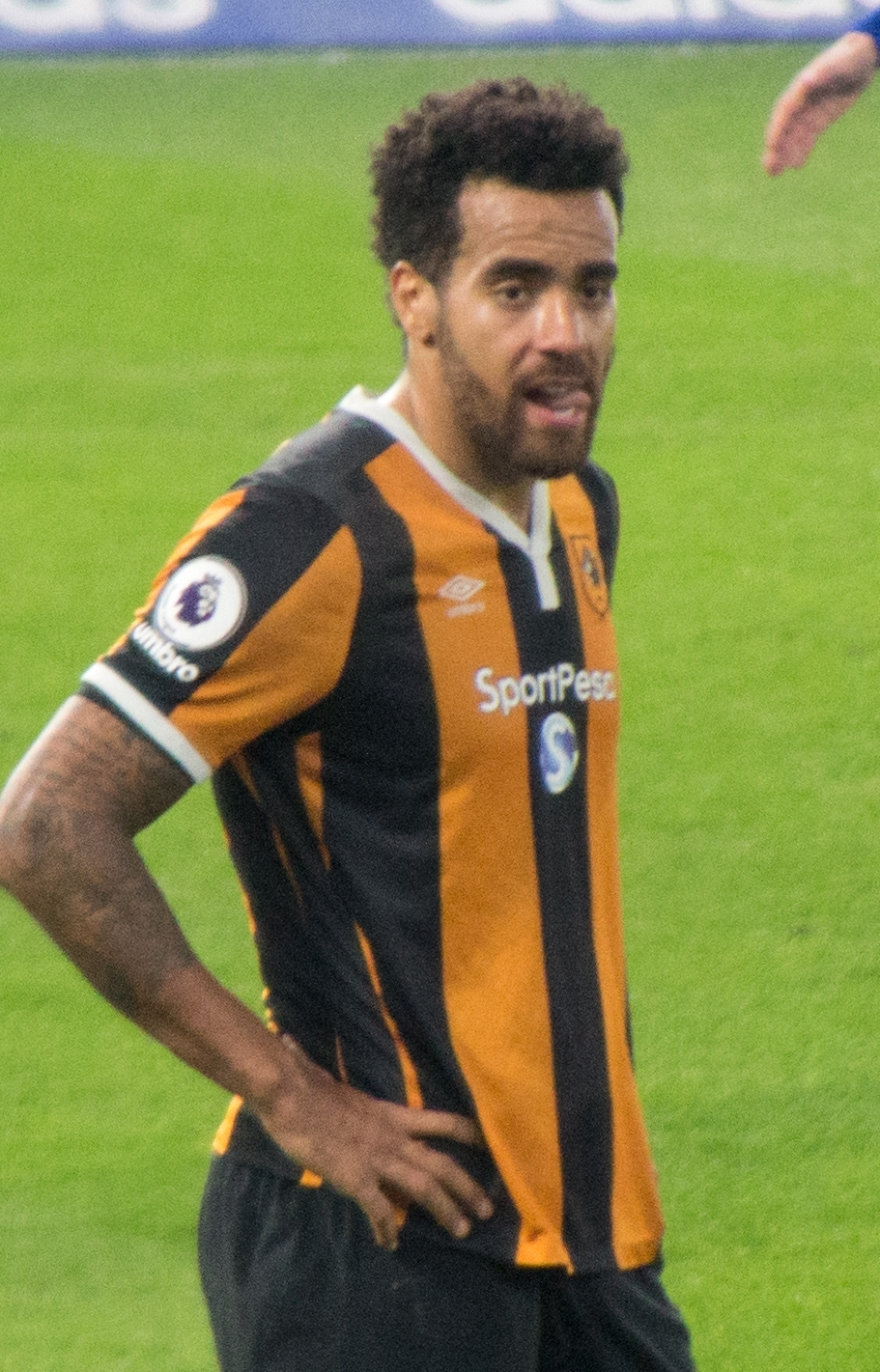
SportPesa sponsorship of Hull City in 2016

=== Kenya ===
SportPesa Kenya invested in the development of the local sports leagues and tournaments in Kenya and Tanzania and South Africa, among them, the 2014 Wambia Memorial Football Tournament in Kakamega, the Francis W. Maingi memorial Football Tournament in Kitui, the Obulala Football Tournament and the Koth Biro Football Tournament in Ziwani.

In 2015 SportPesa announced their title partnership with the Super 8 Premier League, ran by Extreme Sports Limited, with over 100 grassroots teams from Nairobi estates registered to participate it grew into a full-fledged league in 2016 after financial support from SportPesa. The league aimed to improve grass-root football, with a number of players later joining top-flight Kenyan teams.

In football, the brand previously supported the Kenyan Premier League, Kenya's domestic top-tier club competition, as well as a key sponsor of the Harambee Stars and Harambee Starlets, Kenya's national men's and women's football teams respectively. This partnership has seen the introduction of linkages with English clubs Everton FC, Arsenal, Southampton and Hull City. The key focus of the contract with the Football Kenya Federation was to ensure that the country develops as a footballing nation, with the stated mission of qualifying for the 2022 FIFA World Cup.

At the height of its support to the Kenyan Premier League, the brand invested in a reward and honour programme working closely with a joint panel of SJAK and KPL coaches who selected the best players, coaches and team managers. The highlight of this annual programme culminated in the gathering of the football community for the prestigious Footballer of the Year (FOYA) Awards where winners selected are celebrated.

In 2015 SportPesa launched their Kits for Africa initiative. An initiative that encourages football fans to donate their old kit for underprivileged, grassroots teams across Africa.

In 2016 Kenya's first female WBC world super bantamweight champion, Fatuma ‘Iron Fist’ Zarika became a SportPesa ambassador and has defended her title in two fights. In 2018, Zarika travelled to Liverpool, UK, to undergo intense training with former world title Cruiserweight champion Tony Bellew and his coaching team prior to her match with Yamileth Mercado in Nairobi.

In 2016 SportPesa signed a five-year deal with Kenya Rugby Union along with Kenya Premier League teams Gor Mahia and AFC Leopards and then second division Nakuru All Stars.

In February 2017 a team dubbed the SportPesa All-Stars, selected from the 18 Kenyan Premier League clubs, became the first-ever team from the country to play in England, where they lost 2–1 to a Hull City Select side at the KCOM Stadium. This partnership was geared towards exposing Kenyan players to the international stage.

In April 2017 SportPesa announced a three -year agreement with Spanish top flight football League – LaLiga to become the Official Betting Partner.

The company's sponsorship status of teams in Kenya was suspended following the withdrawal of its operating license in July 2019 – the license was reinstated in October 2020 after the brand signed a five-year deal with Milestone Games Ltd which then took over the rights to operate under the name SportPesa.

In 2021, SportPesa signed a new sponsorship deal with Wazee Pamoja League. A league that consist of 11 teams whose players are +33 years old, the focus being to provide a place for retired footballers or just people over the age of 33 to have a space to train, play and network.

In October 2021, SportPesa became Murang'a Seal's primary sponsor. As part of the deal, SportPesa will support the Murang'a Seal Football Academy, which is growing into a sports excellence centre.

In 2022, SportPesa agreed a three-year shirt sponsorship with Kenya Rugby Union team Kenya Sevens Rugby and a one-year shirt sponsorship with Kenya Premier League team Gor Mahia.

SportPesa signed a sponsorship deal with Gor Mahia FC in September 2022. The three-year deal will cover the team playing in the Africa CAF championships and the Kenya Premier League.

In December 2022, SportPesa reaffirmed its support for Kenyan rugby by continuing its sponsorship of the National rugby 7s team, the Shujaa. Besides, the brand became the title partner of the National Rugby 7s Circuit in 2023, renamed SportPesa National 7s Circuit, for supporting rugby in Kenya.

In August 2024, SportPesa signed a three-year sponsorship deal worth KSh 75 million with Kenyan Premier League club Shabana FC.

=== Tanzania ===
Since 2017, SportPesa Tanzania has hosted several international clubs and players, including Everton and Sevilla, as well as renowned boxers such as Hassan Mwakinyo and Tony Bellew. One of the notable events organized by SportPesa Tanzania is the SportPesa Cup. These initiatives in hosting international clubs and players have further solidified its position as a key player in the Tanzanian sports and betting landscape.

In 2018 SportPesa Tanzania renovated the Dar es Salaam National Stadium. They reseeded the pitch and also improved changing rooms for both players and referees as well as improved the Stadium's infrastructure.

In 2018, the company financed the construction of Kizimkazi Dispensary doctors housing units in Southern Unguja District in Zanzibar.

In 2019, SportPesa Tanzania, with Arsenal FC, launched their ‘Coaches to Count On’ initiative. As part of the collaboration, SportPesa developed ‘football clinics’, across Kenya, Tanzania and South Africa, with Arsenal developing comprehensive training programmes for aspiring soccer coaches. Later, English Premier League side Southampton also joined the initiative.

The company has actively engaged in sponsorship initiatives. SportPesa Tanzania has been a significant sponsor events, sports initiatives and sponsor of various football clubs (Simba SC, Young Africans SC, Namungo FC and Singida Big Stars) as the main club sponsor. In 2021 SportPesa Tanzania extended its sponsorship deals with one of the top 5 Tanzania Premier League clubs, Young Africans for three seasons, Namungo FC and four-year deal with Singida Big Stars.

SportPesa Tanzania also runs a free-to-play football prediction game called SportPesa Goal Rush, in which participants predict the team that will score the first goal and the exact minute of that goal across three selected matches. Entry is free, and players receive a digital ticket confirming their participation. Weekly results published by SportPesa highlight multiple winners and varying cash rewards, with top prizes determined by the promotional period.

In August 2025, SportPesa renewed its sponsorship of Young Africans SC for a further three years in a deal valued at TZS 21.7 billion, covering the men's, women's, and grassroots teams. Yanga SC won their fourth consecutive Tanzanian Premier League title in the 2024/25 season.

=== South Africa ===
In August 2017, SportPesa South Africa signed sponsorship deals with Cape Town City F.C., a team in the South Africa's Premiership, being the first sports betting company to headline sponsor a team in the Premiership.

In 2019 SportPesa announced a deal with mobile operator Cell C, allowing Cell C customers to play and manage their SportPesa accounts through USSD, free of charge. Pioneering USSD and SMS betting in South Africa.

In April 2019, SportPesa announced ‘Coaches to Count On’. A new scheme which saw coaching staff from SportPesa partners and English football clubs Arsenal, Southampton, and Hull visit South Africa, Tanzania and Kenya to provide coaching clinics for aspiring coaches in the local communities.

In September 2025, SportPesa signed a shirt sponsorship deal with Cape Town City, then in the National First Division.

In August 2025, SportPesa became the official betting partner of the DHL Stormers for the 2025/26 United Rugby Championship season, with the SportPesa logo appearing on the club's kit.

In January 2026, SportPesa became a national sponsor of the FNB Varsity Cup, South Africa's premier university rugby competition.

=== Global Partnerships ===
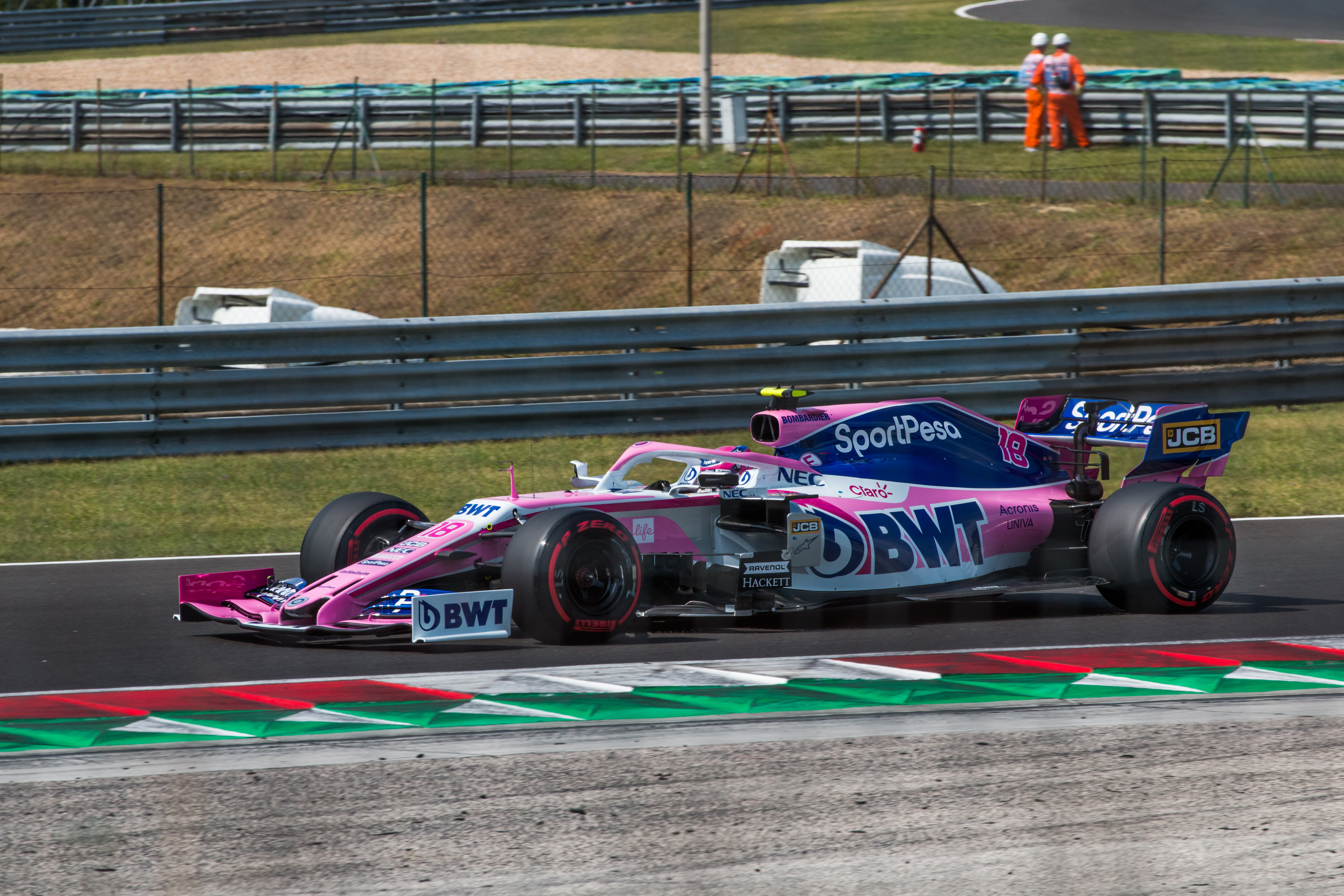
SportPesa Racing Point RP19 at the 2019 Hungarian Grand Prix

In 2016, SportPesa announced partnerships with English football clubs – Arsenal (Official Africa Betting Partner), Southampton (Official Betting Partner), Hull City (Official Shirt Sponsorship).

In 2017, it was announced that SportPesa were to become English Premier League club Everton's principal partner with a club-record multi-year agreement, the most lucrative in the club's 140-year history.

In 2019, SportPesa became an Official Partner of the club's charitable arm Everton in the Community. The partnership saw SportPesa provide funding for Everton in the Community's long-standing flagship mental health programme ‘Imagine Your Goals’, which since April 2018 was affected by external NHS budget cuts. The partnership also saw SportPesa become a ‘Founding Partner’ of Everton in the Community's mental-health focused campaign, ‘The People's Place’, a purpose-built mental health facility near to Goodison Park to support anyone in need. In addition to a financial contribution to The People's Place, SportPesa created ‘Goals That Give’, a new initiative to donate £1,000 for every Everton goal scored at Goodison Park for the entire length of the partnership. In 2020, it was announced that the partnerships would end after the 2019–20 season.

=== Formula 1 ===
On 13 February 2019, it was announced that SportPesa became the new title sponsor for the Racing Point F1 Team for the 2019 season. The team was officially entered as SportPesa Racing Point F1 Team finishing the season in 7th place with 73 points.

== SportPesa Super Cup ==
In June 2016, SportPesa announced the first SportPesa Super Cup, an eight-team football knockout tournament that featured four teams each from Kenya and Tanzania. The first edition was held in Tanzania where Kenya's Gor Mahia FC emerged the tournament winner. The Winner of the SportPesa Super Cup played Everton FC on 13 July 2017 in the most successful football event in East Africa ever.

== Recognition and awards ==
In 2016, SportPesa won the Best African Sponsorship Award at the Discovery Sports Industry Awards (DSIA). In 2017, was recognized as a Superbrand, placed 13th in the ranking of the best companies in Kenya. In 2025, SportPesa Tanzania was named Best Sports Betting Brand in Africa at the Best Brand Africa Awards.
