= Andries Maseko =

South African soccer player

Personal information
- Full name: Andries Mfundisi Maseko
- Date of birth: 25 December 1955
- Place of birth: KwaThema, South Africa
- Date of death: 26 October 2013 (aged 58)
- Place of death: Johannesburg, South Africa
- Position: Attacking midfielder

Youth career
- Harmed Stars
- 1970–1971: Moroka Swallows Ltd.

Senior career*
| Years | Team | Apps | (Gls) |
| 1972–1983 | Moroka Swallows | | |
| 1978–1980 | Washington Diplomats (loan) | 21 | (1) |
| 1980–1982 | San Jose Earthquakes (loan) | 28 | (3) |
| 1982–1983 | Phoenix Inferno (futsal) (loan) | 18 | (1) |
| 1983–1985 | Benoni United | | |
| 1985 | Grinaker Rangers | | |

International career
| 1977 | South Africa | | |
- * Club domestic league appearances and goals

Andries "Six Mabone" Maseko (25 December 1955 – 26 October 2013) was a South African football striker who played for Moroka Swallows, San Jose Earthquakes, Washington Diplomats and Phoenix Inferno.

== Early life ==
Maseko was born to Ephraim and Lettie Maseko (born 1914) in KwaThema. Ephraim Maseko died before he turned professional in 1972.

== Playing career ==
In 1970, he joined Moroka Swallows from amateur club Harmed Stars at the age of 15. During a 1974 NPSL match against Umlazi Citizens, Maseko scored 8 goals in 13-1 win at the Sinaba Stadium, Daveyton. He was part of the Swallows era where the players were known as the 'Massacres' because majority of their surnames started with 'M'. The side include like Frederick Malebane, Mongezi Joel Mnini, Trott Nchilo Moloto, Ephraim Mashaba, Jimmy Mahlangu and Daniel Mophosho.

He joined Washington Diplomats in 1978 and became one of the few South African black players in America alongside Abednigo Ngcobo, Jomo Sono, Kaizer Motaung and Patrick Ntsoelengoe. During his spell at Washington Diplomats, he was a teammate of Johan Cruyff.

Maseko left Washington Diplomats in 1982 and joined San Jose Earthquakes and played together with George Best. After leaving San Jose Earthquakes, he had a short spell at Phoenix Inferno before returning to South Africa to play for Benoni United. He retired at the age of 30 during his spell at Grinaker Rangers due to a groin injury which made him limp from years after that. Maseko said "The injury was a blow to my career as I was forced to hang up my boots for good, if it wasn't for that I would have played for a few more years".

== International career ==
Maseko was in the South African team that defeated Rhodesia by a score of 7-0 in 1977 at Rand Stadium in Johannesburg. He also played against an unofficial selection from Argentina and helped beat them 7-0. The previous night he, Jomo Sono, Lawrence Chelin and Patrick Ntsoelengoe spent the night in Banks Setlhodi's room planning how they would play and shared the goals among themselves.

== Personal life ==
He was married to Gladys Maseko and had three children.

== Death ==
Maseko died on 26 October 2013 at the Chris Hani Baragwanath Hospital after he was admitted on Thursday the 24th. Banks Setlhodi said "I knew Andries way before he joined Moroka Swallows. As a footballer, we all know that he was one of the best players but, on a personal level, he was very humble and down-to-earth...We just connected with him on another level, even away from football. He was one of the greatest guys I have ever come across."
