= Doctor Khumalo =

South African soccer player (born 1967)

Personal information
- Full name: Theophilus Doctorson Khumalo
- Date of birth: 26 June 1967 (age 59)
- Place of birth: Soweto, South Africa
- Height: 6 ft 1 in (1.85 m)
- Position: Central midfielder

Youth career
- 1984–1985: Moroka Swallows
- 1986: Kaizer Chiefs

Senior career*
Years	Team	Apps	(Gls)
1987–2002	Kaizer Chiefs	397	(75)
1995	→ Ferro Carril Oeste (loan)	4	(1)
1996–1997	→ Columbus Crew (loan)	43	(5)
Total		444	(81)

International career
1992–2001	South Africa	50	(9)
- * Club domestic league appearances and goals

Theophilus Doctorson Khumalo (born 26 June 1967) is a South African former professional soccer player. Popularly nicknamed Doctor for his tactical acumen, he was a renowned midfielder for Kaizer Chiefs and the South African national team. He is widely regarded as one of the greatest footballers in the history of South African football. After his farewell match for Kaizer Chiefs in 2004, Executive Chairman Kaizer Motaung retired his No. 15 jersey in honour of his legacy and contribution to the club.

== Career ==
Having started playing football in 1984 with Swallows Reserves, Khumalo then went to Kaizer Chiefs, where he initially played for the junior team. His father, Eliakim Khumalo, a renowned player of the 1970s and early 1980s, served as his mentor. Khumalo was promoted to the senior team by coach Ted Dumitru the following year, when he started a game against arch rivals Orlando Pirates.

Khumalo went on to become a star player for Kaizer Chiefs and did not play for any other South African football club, only leaving them for short overseas playing periods – he signed with FIFA agent Marcelo Houseman who first took him to Argentinian club Ferro Carril Oeste for six months in 1995, while in 1996 and 1997 he played for the Columbus Crew of Major League Soccer.

The high-point of Khumalo's football career was the 1990s; he was part of the Kaizer Chiefs teams that won three South African league championship titles and five knockout trophies and was also voted South African Footballer of the Year in 1992. During his career at the club, he played in a total of 397 league and cup games, scoring 75 goals.

After the re-admission of South Africa to FIFA in 1992, Khumalo was selected to be a member of the South African squad for its first official international match in July of the same year, against Cameroon. South Africa won the match 1–0, due to a penalty scored by Khumalo. He was also a leading member of the winning South African national team at the 1996 African Nations Cup. He also represented South Africa in the 1998 Football World Cup. Throughout his whole international career, he played for South Africa 50 times (twice as captain), scoring nine goals making him the 13th most capped South African footballer.

One of Doctor Khumalo's most memorable games was perhaps the 1996 Mandela Cup match, where South Africa played against Brazil. Phil Masinga scored the first goal from Doctor Khumalo's corner kick. Khumalo then scored the second goal to make the score 2–0 in favour of the South Africans. Unfortunately for Bafana, Brazil came back in the second half, scoring three goals, to win the encounter 3–2.

After retiring from professional football in 2002, Khumalo moved into coaching.

Khumalo was voted 62nd in the Top 100 Great South Africans in 2004.

From 2017 to 2018, he was the technical director of Baroka.

== Coaching career ==
He has a SAFA Level 1, Level 2 and Level 3 coaching licences, an English Football Association licence which he got in 2005 and a UEFA B licence through the German Football Federation in 2007. He began his coaching career at Kaizer Chiefs, where he served as co-coach with Donald Khuse during the 2002–03 season before becoming an assistant coach under Ted Dumitru. He later moved into youth development, serving as Kaizer Chiefs Under-17 coach before taking charge of the South Africa national under-17 team.

== Acting career ==
Khumalo made his film acting debut with the German/South African production Themba. He plays himself as the coach of the under 21s. The movie is about Themba, a young and ambitious football youth, who is faced with poverty, AIDS and violence, but eventually makes his way on to the South African national team. The film is based on a novel by Lutz van Dijk and premiered at the Berlinale 2010.

== Career statistics ==
=== International goals ===
Scores and results list South Africa's goal tally first, score column indicates score after each Khumalo goal.

List of international goals scored by Doctor Khumalo
No.	Date	Venue	Opponent	Score	Result	Competition
1	7 July 1992	Kings Park Stadium, Durban, South Africa	Cameroon	1–0	1–0	Friendly
2	10 May 1994	Ellis Park, Johannesburg, South Africa	Zambia	2–0	2–1	Friendly
3	13 November 1994	Independence Stadium, Lusaka, Zambia	Zambia	1–0	1–1	AFCON Qualifier
4	29 November 1994	Loftus Versfeld, Pretoria, South Africa	Ghana	2–0	2–1	Simba Cup
5	26 April 1995	Setsoto Stadium, Maseru, Lesotho	Lesotho	1–0	3–1	Friendly
6	13 May 1995	Ellis Park, Johannesburg, South Africa	Argentina	1–0	1–1	Friendly
7	30 September 1995	FNB Stadium, Johannesburg, South Africa	Mozambique	3–2	3–2	Friendly
8	24 April 1996	FNB Stadium, Johannesburg, South Africa	Brazil	2–0	2–3	Friendly
9	27 April 1997	Stade de Kégué, Lomé, Togo	Zaire	1–0	2–1	1998 FIFA World Cup qualification

== Honours ==
Kaizer Chiefs

- National Soccer League (3): 1989, 1991, 1992
- BP Top 8 (6): 1987, 1989, 1991, 1992, 1994, 2001
- Mainstay Cup: 1987
- JPS Knockout Cup (2): 1988, 1989
- Rothmans Cup (2): 1997, 1998
- Bob Save Super Bowl (2): 1992, 2000
- Coca-Cola Cup: 2001
- African Cup Winners' Cup: 2001

South Africa

- Africa Cup of Nations: 1996

Individual

- South African Footballer of the Year: 1992
- MLS All-Star: 1996
- South African Hall of Fame inductee: 2025
