= 2026 Carling Knockout Cup =

Tournament details
- Country: South Africa
- Dates: 24 October 2026 – 12 December 2026
- Teams: 16

Tournament statistics
- Matches played: 14
- Goals scored: 31 (2.21 per match)
- Top goal scorer(s): Wandile Duba (4 goals)
- All statistics correct as of 22 November 2026.

The 2026 Carling Knockout Cup is the fourth season of the South African soccer competition, the Carling Knockout Cup, under its new sponsored name. It was organised by the Premier Soccer League and Carling and runs from 24 October to 12 December 2026. Orlando Pirates are the defending champions after defeating Marumo Gallants in the last year. This year's final will be contested by the two Soweto arch rivals between Orlando Pirates and Kaizer Chiefs, having previously met in the 2010, where Kaizer Chiefs won 3–0 in the final.

== Teams ==
The teams consist of the 16 teams from the 2025–26 South African Premiership.

- AmaZulu
- Chippa United
- Durban City
- Golden Arrows
- Kaizer Chiefs
- Kruger United
- Mamelodi Sundowns
- Marumo Gallants
- Milford
- Orlando Pirates
- Polokwane City
- Richards Bay
- Sekhukhune United
- Siwelele
- Stellenbosch
- TS Galaxy

== Draws ==
The draws (except for semi and final draw) are dependent on each team's final position in the previous Betway Premiership Season. The top teams are put in one seeding while the opposite happens as well for lower teams. This means that the top 4 teams from the last season, Orlando Pirates, Mamelodi Sundowns, Kaizer Chiefs and AmaZulu are not going to meet each other until the semi-finals (if they qualify for them).

== Results ==
=== Round of 16 ===
24 October 2026	Golden Arrows	4–0	Chippa United	Umlazi
15:00 SAST	Dion 11'; Sithole 23'; Zwane 83'; Karelse 86'	Report		Stadium: King Zwelithini Stadium; Referee: Christopher Kistoor

24 October 2026	Polokwane City	0-0 (a.e.t.) (3-4 p)	Siwelele	Polokwane
18:00 SAST		Report	Baliti (red card)	Stadium: Old Peter Mokaba Stadium; Referee: Luxolo Badi

25 October 2026	Kruger United	0-1	AmaZulu	Mbombela
15:00 SAST		Report	Ekstein 78'	Stadium: Mbombela Stadium; Referee: Cedrick Muvhali

25 October 2026	Sekhukhune United	3-1	Richards Bay	KaNyamazane
18:00 SAST	Ohizu 53'; Makubo 83'; Muzeu 88'	Report	Xulu 85'	Stadium: KaNyamazane Stadium; Referee: Xola Sitela

27 October 2026	Mamelodi Sundowns	1–0	Marumo Gallants	Arcadia
19:00 SAST	Ndlovu 20'	Report		Stadium: Loftus Versfeld Stadium; Referee: Eugene Mdluli

27 October 2026	Orlando Pirates	3–0	Milford	Soweto
19:00 SAST	Mokobodi 16'; Moremi 35' 45+2'	Report		Stadium: Orlando Stadium; Referee: Jelly Chavani

27 October 2026	Kaizer Chiefs	3-0	TS Galaxy	Johannesburg
19:00 SAST	Wandile Duba 48' 63' 66'	Report		Stadium: FNB Stadium; Referee: Siyabulela Qunta

28 October 2026	Durban City	0-2	Stellenbosch	Chatsworth
19:00 SAST		Report	Sinoxolo Kwayiba 83' 90+4'	Stadium: Chatsworth Stadium; Referee: Moses Kheswa

=== Quarter-finals ===
3 November 2026	Mamelodi Sundowns	1–0	Golden Arrows	Arcadia
19:00 SAST	Iqraam Rayners 69'	Report		Stadium: Loftus Versfeld Stadium, Referee: Christopher Kistoor

7 November 2026	Orlando Pirates	1–0	Sekhukhune United	Soweto
15:00 SAST	Mpho Padime 32'			Stadium: Orlando Stadium

8 November 2026	Kaizer Chiefs	2–1	Siwelele	Polokwane
18:00 SAST	Wandile Duba 45+3' (pen.); Asanele Velebayi 84'	Report	Siyabonga Ndebele 12'	Stadium: Peter Mokaba Stadium

8 November 2026	Stellenbosch	2–1	AmaZulu	Stellenbosch
18:00 SAST	Chumani Butsaka 29'; Sinoxolo Kwayiba 90+8' (pen.)	Report	Gopolang Taunyana 33' (o.g.)	Stadium: Danie Craven Stadium

=== Semi-finals ===
21 November 2026	Stellenbosch	0–2	Orlando Pirates	Durban
15:30 SAST			Evidence Makgopa 69', 75'	Stadium: Moses Mabhida Stadium

22 November 2026	Mamelodi Sundowns	1–2 (a.e.t.)	Kaizer Chiefs	Pretoria
15:30 SAST	Mothobi Mvala 120+6'		Pule Mmodi 93'; Elias Mokwana 105'	Stadium: Loftus Versfeld Stadium

=== Final ===
12 December 2026	Orlando Pirates	v	Kaizer Chiefs	TBA
				Stadium: TBA
