= Mbekezeli Mbokazi =

South African soccer player (born 2005)

Personal information
- Full name: Mbekezeli Mfanufikile Mbokazi
- Date of birth: 19 September 2005 (age 21)
- Place of birth: Hluhluwe, South Africa
- Height: 1.77 m (5 ft 10 in)
- Position: Defender

Team information
- Current team: Chicago Fire
- Number: 4

Youth career
- Makhasa F.C.
- –2023: Langalibalele Academy
- 2024: Orlando Pirates U23

Senior career*
Years	Team	Apps	(Gls)
2025	Orlando Pirates	23	(2)
2026–	Chicago Fire	20	(0)

International career^{‡}
2024–2025	South Africa U20	5	(1)
2025–	South Africa	15	(1)
Medal record
Representing South Africa
COSAFA U-20 Cup
Gold medal – first place	2024 Mozambique
- * Club domestic league appearances and goals as of 17 November 2026 ‡ National team caps and goals as of 29 June 2026

Mbekezeli Mfanufikile Mbokazi (born 19 September 2005), is a South African professional soccer player who plays as a center-back for Major League Soccer side Chicago Fire and the South Africa national team.

Originally a member of Orlando Pirates' reserve team, Mbokazi made his first-team debut in March 2025. Later that year, he won his first two major professional trophies as Orlando Pirates claimed the MTN 8 and the Carling Knockout Cup at the start of the 2025-26 season. He became youngest player to captain Orlando Pirates, doing so at the age of 19 before he transferred to Chicago Fire.

== Club career ==
=== Orlando Pirates ===
He captained Orlando Pirates U23 in the PSL Reserve League in 2024. Mbokazi made his Orlando Pirates senior debut on 5 March 2025 in a 1–0 win over Chippa United. He won his first man of the match award with the Orlando Pirates against the Mamelodi Sundowns on 16 March 2025.

After Nkosinathi Sibisi went off injured in the first game of the 2025–26 South African Premiership, Mbokazi quickly settled in as captain and became the youngest captain for Orlando Pirates since Mbulelo Mabizela in the 2002–03 season. He was later made vice-captain behind Sibisi and Thapelo Xoki for the 2025–26 season.

Mbokazi won his first trophy with Orlando Pirates after they defeated Stellenbosch in the final to win the 2025 MTN 8. He made his continental debut in the 2025–26 CAF Champions League when he captained Orlando Pirates in a 3–0 win against Lioli from Lesotho. During the 2025 Carling Knockout Cup, he scored the winner in the round of 16 match against Siwelele to send the Buccaneers into the quarterfinals. He later won the October 2025 goal of month for his strike.

In his final match as a player for Orlando Pirates he captained the side in their victorious final of the 2025 Carling Knockout Cup against Marumo Gallants at the Peter Mokaba Stadium in Polokwane on 6 December 2025, winning his second trophy with the club. He was later awarded the Carling Knockout player of the tournament for his performances.

He was nominated for the young player of the year award at the 2025 CAF awards.

=== Chicago Fire ===
In December 2025, he was signed to Major League Soccer side Chicago Fire FC with the deal running until 2029 with a club option for the 2029-30 season. He was included in the 2026 MLS All-Star Game but was ruled out with a thigh injury.

== International career ==
Mbokazi was selected for 2024 COSAFA U-20 Cup with the South Africa national under-20 soccer team that won the tournament and qualified for the 2025 U-20 Africa Cup of Nations. He played all matches in the tournament and scored the fifth goal in a 5–0 win over Malawi.

Mbokazi's strong development at club level did not go unnoticed. During his first professional season, Mbokazi established himself as a starting centre-back for Orlando Pirates. His increased involvement with the club affected his participation at youth level, as he was left out of South Africa's squad for the 2025 U-20 Africa Cup of Nations, which the team won to qualify for the 2025 FIFA U-20 World Cup. Mbokazi did not participate in the latter tournament either, as he was already part of the senior squad for the 2026 FIFA World Cup qualifying campaign.

He was called up to South Africa's senior squad less than three months after making his first-team debut with the Buccaneers. He was selected for South Africa's friendly matches against Tanzania and Mozambique, making his senior international debut in a 2–0 victory over Mozambique in May 2025.

He was subsequently selected for the 2026 FIFA World Cup qualifiers against Lesotho and Nigeria in September 2025. He played both games and ultimately had a man of the match performance in the 1-all draw against Nigeria. Mbokazi was retained for South Africa's final qualifying fixtures against Zimbabwe and Rwanda. He played the full match against Zimbabwe but was sent off in stoppage time following a confrontation with Tawanda Maswanhise during a physical tussle. The dismissal ruled him out of the subsequent qualifier against Rwanda four days later through suspension. South Africa defeated Rwanda on 14 October 2025 to secure qualification for the 2026 FIFA World Cup in the process.

A few months later, Mbokazi was called up to the South Africa squad for the 2025 Africa Cup of Nations. He emerged as one of the team's key players throughout the tournament, making four appearances as Bafana Bafana reached the round of 16, where they were eliminated following a 2–1 defeat to Cameroon. His displays throughout the tournament drew attention beyond the continent, despite South Africa's early elimination.

In his first international appearance following the tournament, Mbokazi scored his maiden international goal in a friendly against Panama, with the match serving as preparation for the 2026 FIFA World Cup. He was subsequently named in South Africa's preliminary squad before earning a place in the final squad for the tournament. As the youngest member of the South African contingent, he impressed with his maturity and composure. He featured in all four of South Africa's matches, beginning with his World Cup debut in the opening match against co-hosts Mexico. Although South Africa lost the match 2–0, Mbokazi's individual display was widely praised.

Five days later, he helped South Africa secure a 1–1 draw against the Czech Republic, although the result was viewed as a setback to the team's hopes of progressing from the group. Mbokazi once again attracted praise for his defensive display. South Africa subsequently faced South Korea in their final group match, needing a victory to advance. They secured a 1–0 win, recording their first World Cup victory since defeating France in 2010, their first clean sheet at the tournament in 24 years and, most importantly, their first-ever progression to the knockout stage. Mbokazi was regarded as one of the tournament's standout young players during the group stage, particularly for his impressive performance against Mexico in the opening match.

Against Canada in the round of 32, Mbokazi continued to attract international attention through his defensive contributions. He produced several crucial last-ditch tackles, recovery runs and clearances, including a vital intervention to deny Jonathan David and a goal-line clearance. However, despite his individual efforts, South Africa suffered a 1–0 defeat and were eliminated from the competition. Mbokazi's performances throughout the tournament earned widespread praise and positive reviews from football supporters.

== Career Statistics ==
=== International goals ===
No.	Date	Venue	Opponent	Score	Result	Competition
1.	31 March 2026	Cape Town Stadium, Cape Town, South Africa	Panama	1–1	1–2	Friendly

== Honours ==
South Africa

- COSAFA U-20 Challenge Cup: 2024

Orlando Pirates

- MTN 8: 2025
- Carling Black Label Cup: 2025
- Betway Premiership: 2025–26

Individual

- 2025 Carling Knockout Cup: player of the tournament
- MLS All-Star: 2026
