= Abednigo Ngcobo =

South African soccer player (1950–2014)

Personal information
- Full name: Abednigo Valdez Ngcobo
- Date of birth: 10 May 1950
- Place of birth: Cato Manor, Durban
- Date of death: 1 November 2014 (aged 64)
- Place of death: Alexandra, Gauteng, South Africa
- Position: Striker

Youth career
- African Bush Rangers
- Rand Koreans
- 1969: Union Jacks

Senior career*
Years	Team	Apps	(Gls)
1970	Zulu Royals		
1971	African Wanderers	20	(11)
1972–1985	Kaizer Chiefs	260	(158)
1975–1976	Denver Dynamos	3	(0)
1976–1980	Minnesota Kicks	20	(5)
1980–1981	Peñarol	15	(18)
Total		318	(192)
- * Club domestic league appearances and goals

Abednigo Valdez "Shaka" Ngcobo (10 May 1950 – 1 November 2014) was a South African association football player who played in South Africa for Peñarol, Minnesota Kicks, Denver Dynamos and Kaizer Chiefs.

== Club career ==
Ngcobo was born in Cato Manor near Durban, South Africa, and started played amateur soccer at a young age for African Bush Rangers, Rand Koreans, Union Jacks. He later joined Zulu Royals and African Wanderers in the new NPSL for blacks in 1971. In 1972, Ngcobo was recruited by Kaizer Chiefs' Ewert Nene when he scored six goals against them in a friendly match. In 1974, he won the league and the BP Top 8 and in the same season he scored a hat trick in a 7–1 win over Moroka Swallows. He left for Denver Dynamos in 1975 after leading Chiefs to their first ever league title the previous season with Kaizer Motaung and Patrick Ntsoelengoe. Motaung scored seven goals that season, providing one assist, Ntsoelengoe scored five goals and four assists and Ngcobo netted five times, while delivering six assists. The following season, Ngcobo and Ntsoelengoe both moved to Minnesota Kicks. In 1976 where he won the Benson and Hedges Trophy, Sales House Cup and the BP Top 8 he set a new record of the fastest goal scored in 10 seconds in a 3–1 win over Moroka Swallows on 11 October 1976 in Vosloorus. In February 1980, before being named the 1979 Footballer of Year, he scored against Highlands Park in that famous Mainstay Cup Final replay and he scored a 13-minute hat-trick against Moroka Swallows. He went AWOL for trials in Uruguay with Peñarol organised by Mario Tuani along with Goodenough Nkomo upon returning he was fined R1000. He later played for Peñarol being striker partners with young Venancio Ramos and Fernando Morena. After suffering from niggling knee injuries later in his career, Valdez retired in December 1984.

== International career ==
Ngcobo played for the SA Black XI in 1973 in a match against a team billed as the UK All Stars. He played in a second match against another All Stars side in 1979, at the Rand Stadium.

== Style of play ==
Former Marabastad Sundowns player and older brother of Zane Moosa, Essop "Smiley" Moosa said " 'Shaka' had great speed and he was unbelievably strong. He could play both as a striker and as a winger, the last position being his best, I felt. He was also a fantastic goalscorer, he had a very educated left-foot, but he could score with both feet." Former Chiefs captain between 1975 and 1986, Ryder Mofokeng said "he could dribble past defenders, he could pass, he could cross and he could shoot. He was one of the best all-round strikers South Africa had."

== After retirement ==
Ngcobo ran a taxi business in Alexandra and lived with his wife Khanyisile and his daughter.

=== Death ===
He died of a heart attack at his home on 1 November 2014, after complaining of chest pains early that morning and died a few hours later.
