= 2014 Carling Black Label Cup =

- Event: Carling Black Label Cup
Kaizer Chiefs	Orlando Pirates
(South Africa)	(South Africa)
0	0
- 5 - 6 Penalty Shootout
- Date: 26 July 2014
- Venue: FNB Stadium, Soweto
- Referee: Victor Gomes
- Attendance: 92 809

The 2014 Carling Black Label Cup was the fourth edition of the competition to be held.

A South African beer brand Black Label started the "Be The Coach" where fans elected the starting 11 of their desired players from the two Soweto derby arch rivals, Orlando Pirates, and Kaizer Chiefs.

The selected teams played the match on 26 July 2014 at the FNB Stadium in Johannesburg.

== About ==
The Black Label Cup replaced the Telkom Charity Cup. Carling Black Label launched the campaign where fans got to select the starting 11 players to take part in this once off Soweto Derby between Orlando Pirates and Kaizer Chiefs on Saturday 26 July 2014. Fans had from June 2014 till 26 July 2014 to select their top 15 player via their mobile phones. During the first 45min, fans could send the shirt number of the player that they wanted to substitute via a text message. At 60min in the second half the player with the most votes were substituted.

== Be The Champion Coach ==
The Carling Black Label also introduced an initiative where two fans had the opportunity to coach their club on matchday. One fan represented Kaizer Chiefs, the other, Orlando Pirates. The 'Consumer Coaches' were randomly selected to be coaches of their respective teams and got to be present at their team's training sessions, pre-match briefings and be part of the dugout with their team.

=== Requirements ===
To be eligible to be a consumer coach the fan should've voted either via their cellphone or at www.carlingblacklabel.co.za, a minimum of 11 times.

=== Consumer Coaches ===
- (South Africa) Tebogo Molekoa (Kaizer Chiefs).
- (South Africa) Cornelius Motsepe from Mmakau.

== Venue ==
The FNB Stadium was chosen to host this once a year event. The FNB Stadium, known as Soccer City during the 2010 FIFA World Cup, is a stadium located in Nasrec, the Soweto area of Johannesburg, South Africa. It is located next to the South African Football Association headquarters (SAFA House) where both the FIFA offices and the Local Organising Committee for the 2010 FIFA World Cup were housed. Designed as the main association football stadium for the World Cup, the FNB Stadium became the largest stadium in Africa with a capacity of 94,700, However its maximum capacity during the 2010 FIFA World Cup was 84,490 due to reserved seating for the press and other VIP's. The stadium is also known by its nickname "The Calabash" due to its resemblance to the African pot or gourd.

== Match ==
=== Details ===
26 July 2014
15:30

Kaizer Chiefs (South Africa)	0 - 0	(South Africa) Orlando Pirates

FNB Stadium, Soweto
Attendance: TBD
THE STARTING XI

KAIZER CHIEFS:
GK	32	(South Africa) Itumeleng Khune
DF	5	(South Africa) Siboniso Gaxa
DF	3	(South Africa) Eric Mathoho
DF	23	(South Africa) Tefu Mashamaite
DF	24	(South Africa) Tsepo Masilela
MF	17	(South Africa) George Lebese
MF	6	(South Africa) Reneilwe Letsholonyane
MF	12	(South Africa) George Maluleka
MF	31	(Zimbabwe) Willard Katsande
FW	8	(Zimbabwe) Kingston Nkhatha (substituted off) 23'
FW	7	(South Africa) Katlego Mphela (substituted off) 53'
Substitutions:
FW	20	(South Africa) Siphelele Mthembu (substituted on) 23'
MF	9	(South Africa) Josta Dladla (substituted on) 53'
?	?	? (substituted on) ?'
Head Coach:
(South Africa) Tebogo Molekoa

ORLANDO PIRATES:
GK	16	(South Africa) Senzo Meyiwa
DF	21	(South Africa) Rooi Mahamutsa
DF	14	(South Africa) Happy Jele
DF	28	(South Africa) Siyabonga Sangweni
DF	19	(South Africa) Thabo Matlaba
MF	12	(South Africa) Tlou Segolela
MF	15	(South Africa) Sifiso Myeni
MF	20	(South Africa) Oupa Manyisa
MF	7	(South Africa) Daine Klate
FW	95	(South Africa) Kermit Erasmus
FW	45	(South Africa) Lehlohonolo Majoro
Substitutions:
?	?	? (substituted on) ?'
?	?	? (substituted on) ?'
?	?	? (substituted on) ?'
?	?	? (substituted on) ?'
?	?	? (substituted on) ?'
Head Coach:
(South Africa) Cornelius Motsepe

== Unavailable players ==
- Matthew Rusike, undergoing injury scans after getting injured the day before the match.
- Siphiwe Tshabalala, picked up an injury in a friendly against Chippa United on 20 July 2014 and was ruled out for 10–14 days.
- Knowledge Musona, listed as an ineligible player as he is still contracted to TSG Hoffenheim despite getting the second highest number of votes with 913,068.
- Bernard Parker, undergoing knee surgery
