= George Maluleka =

South African soccer player

Personal information
- Full name: George Nyiko Maluleka
- Date of birth: 7 January 1989 (age 37)
- Place of birth: Tembisa, South Africa
- Height: 1.70 m (5 ft 7 in)
- Position: Midfielder

Team information
- Current team: Kruger United

Youth career
- Kempton Park FC
- Pretoria University

Senior career*
| Years | Team | Apps | (Gls) |
| 2006–2007 | Pretoria University | 28 | (10) |
| 2007–2009 | Supersport United | 7 | (0) |
| 2007–2008 | → Pretoria University (loan) | | |
| 2009–2012 | Ajax Cape Town | 78 | (7) |
| 2012–2013 | Supersport United | 28 | (2) |
| 2014–2020 | Kaizer Chiefs | 137 | (6) |
| 2020–2022 | Mamelodi Sundowns | 15 | (0) |
| 2022–2024 | AmaZulu | 41 | (0) |
| 2024– | Kruger United | 1 | (0) |

International career
| ?–2009 | South Africa U20 | 4 | (0) |
| 2011–2012 | South Africa | 6 | (0) |
- * Club domestic league appearances and goals as of 13 July 2023

George Nyiko Maluleka (born 7 January 1989) is a South African soccer player who plays for Kruger United in the South African National First Division.

== Club career ==
Maluleka played for Kempton Park FC and Pretoria University starting out as a striker. In 2006, Maluleke was promoted to the senior side. He managed a fabulous spell with the club totaling ten goals in 28 matches. Maluleka was noticed by Supersport United and in 2007 he joined the club. Maluleka struggled to get game time and spent time on the bench as unused substitute. He was loaned to Pretoria University. In 2009, he was loaned again to Ajax Cape Town. In 2012, Maluleka returned to the parent Supersport United. In 2014, he joined Kaizer Chiefs, signing a three-and-a-half-year contract. He made his Chiefs debut on 23 January 2014 in a 1–0 win over Mamelodi Sundowns at Loftus Versfeld. He scored his first goal in Amakhosi colours in a 2–0 win over a relegation zone-placed Polokwane City where both George Lebese and George Maluleka scored. Maluleka featured in a pre-season friendly match against Chippa United and he blasted home Chiefs' fourth goal in the dying seconds to win 4–2. On 26 July 2014 during the 2014 Carling Black Label Cup, Maluleka missed a penalty in 66th minute with the ball crashing onto the woodwork and missed again in the penalty shoot out with an identical copy of the penalty he took earlier and Orlando Pirates won 6–5. Maluleka scored a second half brace in the MTN8 1st leg semi-final against Platinum Stars, he volleyed home after Luvolwethu Mpeta poorly cleared a Kingston Nkhatha header and scored a sublime free kick outside the box to win 2–0. He was voted Goal.com's Player of the Week. He curled home another free kick from 22-yards in the second leg to give Chiefs a 3–0 aggregate lead. Chiefs made it to the final winning 5–0 on aggregate.

== International career ==
Maluleka made his debut for the senior national team on 12 November 2011 in a 1–1 draw against Ivory Coast.
