= Orlando Casares =

Argentinean football coach

Personal information
- Place of birth: Argentina

Managerial career
- Years: Team
- Dynamos Giyani
- 1980–1981: Nicaragua
- 1983: Kaizer Chiefs

Orlando Casares was an Argentinean retired football coach who is last known to have managed Kaizer Chiefs in South Africa. He is the father of Matias Casares, the president of the Haitian Soccer Association based in Fort Lauderdale.

== South Africa ==
Assuming the role of Kaizer Chiefs head coach in 1983, Casares steered the Amakhosi to that year's Datsun Challenge, but had an enmity with former coach Banks Setlhodi and poor league results which eventually got him dismissed. The Argentine was also unpopular with the Kaizer Chiefs players who questioned his qualifications.
