= Amakhosi =

Amakhosi may refer to:

- Kaizer Chiefs F.C., a South African football club nicknamed AmaKhosi
  - Amakhosi Stadium, a stalled project
- Amakhosi Theatre, a Zimbabwean theatre company
