= Kingston Nkhatha =

Zimbabwean footballer (born 1985)

Personal information
- Full name: Kingston Brooklyn Nkhatha
- Date of birth: 27 October 1985 (age 41)
- Place of birth: Zvimba, Zimbabwe
- Position: Forward

Team information
- Current team: Mbombela United
- Number: 29

Senior career*
Years	Team	Apps	(Gls)
2003–2007	Buymore F.C.	82	(75)
2007	CAPS United	17	(12)
2007–2011	Free State Stars	41	(5)
2008–2009	→ Carara Kicks (loan)	20	(11)
2011–2012	Black Leopards	22	(8)
2012–2015	Kaizer Chiefs	69	(16)
2015–2018	SuperSport United	69	(10)
2018	Dynamos		
2019–	Mbombela United	7	(2)

International career^{‡}
2007–	Zimbabwe	10	(3)
- * Club domestic league appearances and goals as of 15:15, 27 May 2019 (UTC) ‡ National team caps and goals as of 26 June 2016

Kingston Nkhatha (born 27 October 1985) is a Zimbabwean professional footballer who plays as a forward for Mbombela United in the South African National First Division and the Zimbabwe national team.

== Club career ==
=== Early career ===
Nkhatha started his career in Zimbabwe with Buymore F.C. and CAPS United, before departing to South Africa to sign for Free State Stars. Less than a year after signing for Free State Stars, Nkhatha was loaned out to Carara Kicks. He returned to FS Stars in 2009 and remained with the club until he left in 2011 to join Black Leopards, eight goals in twenty-two appearances followed before he was signed by Kaizer Chiefs.

=== Kaizer Chiefs ===
He joined Kaizer Chiefs in July 2012 under new coach Stuart Baxter. He made his league debut on 11 August 2012 in a 6–0 win over AmaZulu. He scored the second goal on debut in the 42nd minute. He went on to score eight goals in 24 matches for the 2012–13 season. Nkhatha urged fans to stop booing him or other players when fans started to boo him towards the end of the 2012–13 and the beginning of the 2013–14 season. He said "As a professional, you cannot take these things to heart otherwise they will destroy you. But I still ask our fans to stop doing it. It is not good for the team". He scored his first goal of the 2013–14 as an equaliser in the Soweto derby to silence critics.

He also started off the 2014 CAF Champions League campaign with a brace in a 3–0 win over Black Africa on 8 February 2014. The first, a long range shot and the second, a header over advancing goalkeeper, Arnold Subeb after a pinpoint drop kick from Itumeleng Khune in the 87th minute. Nkhatha scored 7 goals in the 2013–14 season again. During 2014–15 pre-season friendlies, he scored against Chippa United in a 4–2 win in Port Elizabeth he competed in the 2014 Carling Black Label Cup but got injured and bruised his thigh in the 23rd minute after clashing with Senzo Meyiwa. In the fourth quarter final of the 2014 MTN 8, Nkhatha scored Chiefs' second goal only in the 5th minute after taking the lead from Reneilwe Letsholonyane's 2nd-minute goal, with a 22-yard volley that first hit the underside of the cross bar. Chiefs won 4–0. In total, Nkhatha made 69 league appearances before departing in 2015.

=== SuperSport United ===
On 16 January 2015, Nkhatha joined Premier Soccer League outfit SuperSport United on a three-and-a-half-year contract. He made his debut on 11 February against his former club Free State Stars and scored his first SuperSport Utd goal in the process. He won his first trophy with SuperSport Utd in May 2016 when the club won the 2015–16 Nedbank Cup.

== International career ==
Nkhatha has won 10 caps and scored 3 goals for the Zimbabwe national team. His international goals have come against Madagascar and Malawi.

== Career statistics ==
=== Club ===
As of 26 June 2016

Appearances and goals by club, season and competition
Club	Season	League			National cup (Note: Includes the Nedbank Cup)		League cup (Note: Includes the Telkom Knockout)		Continental (Note: Includes the CAF Champions League)		Other (Note: Includes the MTN 8)		Total	
Club	Season	Division	Apps	Goals	Apps	Goals	Apps	Goals	Apps	Goals	Apps	Goals	Apps	Goals
SuperSport United	2014–15	Premier Soccer League	8	1	4	2	0	0	—		0	0	12	3
SuperSport United	2015–16	Premier Soccer League	23	6	4	0	2	1	—		1	0	30	7
SuperSport United	Total		31	7	8	2	2	1	—		1	0	42	10
Career total			31	7	8	2	2	1	—		1	0	42	10

=== International ===
As of 26 June 2016

Appearances and goals by national team and year
National team	Year	Apps	Goals
Zimbabwe	2007–	10	3
Total		10	3

As of 26 June 2016. Scores and results list Zimbabwe's goal tally first.

Goal	Date	Venue	Opponent	Score	Result	Competition
1	28 April 2007	Estádio da Machava, Maputo, Mozambique	Madagascar	1–0	1–0	2007 COSAFA Cup
2	9 September 2007	Barbourfields Stadium, Bulawayo, Zimbabwe	Malawi	1–0	3–1	2008 Africa Cup of Nations qualification
3	5 March 2014	Kamuzu Stadium, Blantyre, Malawi	Malawi	4–1	4–1	Friendly

== Honours ==
Kaizer Chiefs

- Premier Soccer League – 2012–13
- Nedbank Cup – 2012–13
- Carling Black Label Cup – 2013
- MTN 8 – 2014

SuperSport United

- Nedbank Cup (2): 2015–16, 2016–17
- MTN 8 – 2017
