= 2019 Carling Black Label Cup =

- Event: Carling Black Label Cup
Kaizer Chiefs	Orlando Pirates
0	2
- Date: 27 July 2019
- Venue: FNB Stadium, Soweto

The 2019 Carling Black Label Cup was the eighth edition of the Carling Black Label Cup to be held.

== Venue ==
The FNB Stadium was chosen to host this annual event. The FNB Stadium, known as Soccer City during the 2010 FIFA World Cup, is a stadium located in Nasrec, the Soweto area of Johannesburg, South Africa.

== Match ==
=== Details ===
27 July 2019
15h00

Kaizer Chiefs	0–2	Orlando Pirates
	Report	Mulenga 18'; Lorch 30'

FNB Stadium, Soweto
