= Patrick Mayo =

South African footballer

Personal information
- Full name: Patrick Mzolisi Mayo
- Date of birth: 15 May 1973 (age 53)
- Place of birth: Port Elizabeth, South Africa
- Height: 1.88 m (6 ft 2 in)
- Position: Midfielder

Senior career*
Years	Team	Apps	(Gls)
1997–2000	Bush Bucks	100	(40)
2000–2003	Supersport United	67	(24)
2003–2007	Kaizer Chiefs	70	(6)
2007–2008	Thanda Royal Zulu	24	(1)
2008–2011	Bay United	22	(1)

International career
2000–2004	South Africa	18	(6)

Managerial career
- 2014: Chippa United (youth coach)
- * Club domestic league appearances and goals

Patrick Mayo (born 15 May 1973) is a South African former soccer player who played as a midfielder who most recently served as an assistant coach to Chippa United's MultiChoice Diski Challenge team. He made 18 appearances for the Bafana Bafana and played at the 2004 African Cup of Nations.

Mayo is the father of Khanyisa Mayo.

== Career ==
While playing for Kaizer Chiefs, Fredericks scored one of the goals in the final of the 2003 Coca-Cola Cup, at the time the richest cup tournament in Africa.
