= Nhlanhla Khuzwayo =

South African footballer (born 1990)

Personal information
- Full name: Nhlanhla Brilliantt Khuzwayo
- Date of birth: 9 February 1990 (age 36)
- Place of birth: Durban, South Africa
- Height: 1.90 m (6 ft 3 in)
- Position: Goalkeeper

Youth career
- FC Masters
- 2009–2010: Durban Warriors

Senior career*
Years	Team	Apps	(Gls)
2010–2012	AmaZulu	3	(0)
2011–2012	→Thanda Royal Zulu (loan)	?	(?)
2012–2018	Kaizer Chiefs	28	(0)
2018–2019	Orlando Pirates	0	(0)

International career
2010–2011	South Africa U23	29	(0)
2012–2015	South Africa	3	(0)
- * Club domestic league appearances and goals

Nhlanhla Brilliant Khuzwayo (born 9 February 1990) is a South African retired international footballer who played as a goalkeeper, and as of April 2026 is goalkeeping coach for Mbabane Highlanders.

== Playing career ==
Khuzwayo joined AmaZulu from Durban Warriors in 2010. He made his debut on 22 September 2010 against Platinum Stars in a 2–2 draw. Khuzwayo played two more league games to finish with a total of 3. He was loaned to National First Division club Thanda Royal Zulu. Khuzwayo joined Chiefs at the end of the 2011–12 season signing a three-year contract which was finalised on 24 May 2012. On 23 May 2012, the day before Khuzwayo signed, AmaZulu general manager Peter O'Connor suggested it was in the player's best interest that the club agreed to let him join Chiefs. "Seeing that Tapuwa Kapini has another three years with us, it was agreed that we would release 'Casillas' [Khuzwayo] because he wouldn't be playing as the first-choice goalkeeper. So to enable him to get more game-time we have decided to allow him to join Chiefs after they had approached us for his services," He made his debut on 28 April 2013 against Platinum Stars at the Peter Mokaba Stadium. The match was billed as the title decider but ended 0–0. He won the league and cup double with Chiefs. In the 2013–14 season he played four matches. He played in a 2–0 win over Golden Arrows in the league, another 2–0 against AS Vita in the CAF Champions League, a 1–0 win over Black Leopards and a 2–1 win over FC Buffalo, both in the Nedbank Cup. In the 2014–15 season he played his first league match in a 2–1 win over University of Pretoria conceding his first league goal since joining Chiefs. Ahead of the eagerly anticipated MTN 8 final, Khuzwayo was the favourite to be the goalkeeper in the absence of Itumeleng Khune. Coach Stuart Baxter said "Itu is one of our top players, and of course we'll miss him. If my Lamborghini isn't working today then maybe I have to take the old Porsche. One of our 'keepers has now got to be a Porsche, maybe he's not a Lamborghini just yet, but he can be that Porsche. Lets see if they step up." In his Soweto derby debut on 20 September 2014, despite being written off as the "weakest link", Khuzwayo made numerous saves in Chiefs' 1–0 win over Orlando Pirates in the 2014 MTN 8 final at the Moses Mabhida Stadium in Durban, his hometown, and he thanked everyone at the club, most notably Khune, after he received the Man of the Match award. "First and foremost I'd like to thank my family, my brothers, my friends, everyone who believed in me, Itumeleng Khune, he was motivating me all the time since I came to Kaizer Chiefs, he's just an inspiration to me,"

After his agent initially denied the rumours that he was going to a return due to a knee injury in June 2019, he retired due to injury in July 2019, aged 29 and having never represented Orlando Pirates in a league match.

== Coaching career ==
In January 2026, Khuzwayo began his coaching career as goalkeeper coach for Mbabane Highlanders.

== International career ==
Khuzwayo has 29 U-23 caps. He got his first call-up in 2010 for a two-match tour in Tehran. He made his international debut for South Africa on 6 January 2012 against Equatorial Guinea.

== Personal life ==
Khuzwayo wears no. 16 because of his late mother who died in 2006 when he was aged 16. On 20 September 2014 during the 2014 MTN 8 Final, Khuzwayo's family home in P-section Umlazi was robbed. His aunt, Sibongile Khuzwayo wrote on a social network that only money and cellphones stolen and TV sets and other furniture was not stolen. The matter was not reported, choosing to approach their security company.
