= 2014 MTN 8 =

Tournament details
- Country: South Africa
- Teams: 8

Final positions
- Champions: Kaizer Chiefs
- Runners-up: Orlando Pirates

Tournament statistics
- Matches played: 9
- Goals scored: 22 (2.44 per match)
- Top goal scorer: G. Maluleka (3)

The 2014 MTN 8 was the 40th edition of South Africa's annual soccer cup competition, the MTN 8. It featured the top eight Premiership teams at the end of the 2013–14 season.

The final was a Soweto derby, with Tefu Mashamaite scoring the only goal for Kaizer Chiefs. Chief's goalkeeper, Brilliant Khuzwayo, earned the man-of-the-match award.

== Teams ==
The eight teams that competed in the MTN 8 knockout competition are (listed according to their finishing position in the 2013–14 South African Premiership):

1. Mamelodi Sundowns
2. Kaizer Chiefs
3. Bidvest Wits
4. Orlando Pirates
5. SuperSport United
6. Bloemfontein Celtic
7. Mpumalanga Black Aces
8. Platinum Stars

== Results ==
=== Quarter-finals ===
1 August 2014
20:00

Bidvest Wits	0–0 (a.e.t.)	Bloemfontein Celtic
	Report
Penalties
Sheppard (penalty scored); Losper (penalty scored); Vilakazi (penalty missed); Ngcobo (penalty scored); Bhasera (penalty scored)	4–3	Ndengane (penalty missed); Lamola (penalty scored); Lakay (penalty scored); Mogorosi (penalty scored); Mzava (penalty missed)

Bidvest Stadium, Braampark

2 August 2014
15:00

Platinum Stars	2–1	Mamelodi Sundowns
Mere 7'; Mabena 15'	Report	89' Modise

Loftus Versfeld Stadium

2 August 2014
20:15

Orlando Pirates	2–1	Supersport United
Klate 33'; Erasmus 39'	Report	68' David Mathebula

Orlando Stadium, Soweto

3 August 2014
15:00

Kaizer Chiefs	4–0	Mpumalanga Black Aces
Letsholonyane 2'; Nkhatha 5'; Masango 60'; Masango 90'	Report

Soccer City

=== Semi-finals ===
==== 1st leg ====
16 August 2014
20:00

Kaizer Chiefs	2–0	Platinum Stars
Maluleka 51'; Maluleka 90'	Report

Royal Bafokeng Stadium
17 August 2014
15:00

Bidvest Wits	0–2	Orlando Pirates
Matlaba 56'; Sangweni 73'	Report

Bidvest Stadium

==== 2nd leg ====
23 August 2014
20:00

Orlando Pirates	3–1	Bidvest Stadium
Erasmus 54'; Majoro 84'; Majoro 90+2'		77' Kebede

Orlando Stadium
24 August 2014
15:00

Kaizer Chiefs	3–0	Platinum Stars
Maluleka 29'	Report	57' Letsholonyane; 90+2' Mphela

Soccer City

=== Final ===
20 September 2014
20:15

Kaizer Chiefs	1–0	Orlando Pirates
Mashamaite 28'	Report

Moses Mabhida Stadium
