= 2005 Coca-Cola Cup =

2005 Coca-Cola Knockout
Tournament details
- Country: South Africa
- Teams: 16

Final positions
- Champions: Jomo Cosmos (2nd title)
- Runners-up: SuperSport United

The 2005 Coca-Cola Cup was the 24th edition of the Coca-Cola Cup, a South African cup competition comprising the 16 teams in the Premiership. The final was won by Jomo Cosmos, who defeated SuperSport United 4–1 on penalties after the final finished 1–1.

In reaching the final, SuperSport, under coach Pitso Mosimane, became the first side to reach five major domestic finals in a row.

The competition was the last under the sponsorship of Coca-Cola, and was renamed the Telkom Knockout in 2006.

== Results ==
=== Final ===
16 December 2006

Jomo Cosmos	1–1 (a.e.t.)	SuperSport United
Mokoena 108'		Zwane 109'
Penalties
	4–1

Peter Mokaba Stadium, Polokwane
