= 2006 Vodacom Challenge =

Soccer tournament in South Africa

The 2006 Vodacom Challenge was a friendly soccer tournament played in South Africa between 15 July and 22 July 2006, and contested by South African clubs Kaizer Chiefs and Orlando Pirates, and English club Manchester United.

== First round ==
15 July 2006

| Orlando Pirates (South Africa) | 0–4 | (England) Manchester United |
|---|---|---|
| | | Solskjær 4', 43'; Richardson 57'; Seema 60' (o.g.) |

Kings Park Stadium, Durban

18 July 2006

| Kaizer Chiefs (South Africa) | 0–1 | (England) Manchester United |
|---|---|---|
| | | Dong 83' |

Newlands Stadium, Cape Town

== Third place match ==
20 July 2006

| Orlando Pirates (South Africa) | 0–2 | (South Africa) Kaizer Chiefs |
|---|---|---|
| | | Bartlett 5'; Schalkwyk 88' |

Newlands Stadium, Cape Town

== Final ==
22 July 2006

| Kaizer Chiefs (South Africa) | 0–0 | (England) Manchester United |
Penalties
| Bartlett (penalty scored); Mooki (penalty scored); McCarthy (penalty missed); Motaung (penalty scored); Fernandez (penalty scored) | 4–3 | (penalty missed) Foster; (penalty scored) David Jones; (penalty scored) Evra; (penalty scored) Richardson; (penalty missed) Eagles |

Loftus Versfeld Stadium, Pretoria
Referee: Eddie Maillet (Seychelles)
