= 2015 Carling Black Label Cup =

- Event: Carling Black Label Cup
Kaizer Chiefs	Orlando Pirates
(South Africa)	(South Africa)
1	1
- 3 - 4 Penalty Shootout
- Date: 1 August 2015
- Venue: FNB Stadium, Soweto
- Attendance: 94,807 (record for the FNB Stadium)

The 2015 Carling Black Label Cup was the fifth edition of the Carling Black Label Cup to be held.

A South African beer brand, Black Label, started the "Be The Coach" where the fans had the opportunity to select the starting 11 of their desired players from the two Soweto derby arch rivals, Orlando Pirates and Kaizer Chiefs, which are two of the most successful and largest soccer clubs in South Africa.

Orlando Pirates defeated Kaizer Chiefs 4–3 on penalties after the game ended 1-1, with Tendai Ndoro scoring the winning kick for Pirates.

== Venue ==
The FNB(First National Bank) Stadium was chosen to host this once a year event. The FNB Stadium, known as Soccer City during the 2010 FIFA World Cup, is a stadium located in Nasrec, the Soweto area of Johannesburg, South Africa.

== Match ==
=== Details ===
1 August 2015

Kaizer Chiefs (South Africa)	1 - 1	(South Africa) Orlando Pirates
Letsholonyane 66'		22' Myeni

FNB Stadium, Soweto
