= Tefu Mashamaite =

South African soccer player (born 1984)

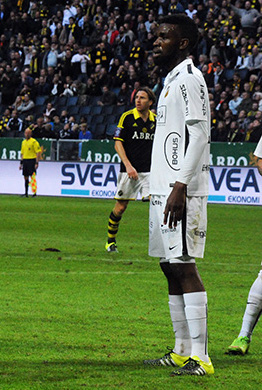

Personal information
- Full name: Tefu Junaid Mashamaite
- Date of birth: 27 September 1984 (age 42)
- Place of birth: Bochum, South Africa
- Height: 1.86 m (6 ft 1 in)
- Position: Central defender

Youth career
- 1999–2003: Dipitsi FC
- 2003–2005: Wits University

Senior career*
Years	Team	Apps	(Gls)
2005–2011	Bidvest Wits	64	(6)
2011–2015	Kaizer Chiefs	100	(7)
2015–2016	BK Häcken	11	(2)
2016–2018	Supersport United	7	(0)
2018–2019	Baberwa F.C.		

International career
2013–2014	South Africa	4	(0)
- * Club domestic league appearances and goals

Tefu Mashamaite (born 27 September 1984) is a South African former soccer player who played as a defender. Mashamaite was known for punishing defences with his powerful headers from corners and dead ball situations and his penchant for scoring in his hometown of Polokwane.

== Early life ==
Mashamaite grew up in rural Bochum about 90 km north-west of Polokwane. Mashamaite was born as his mother's only child, he only met his father when he was 10 years old. He saw him six times before he died in 2010. Mashamaite started playing soccer in 1999 for Dipitsi in Bochum and playing as a defender wearing number 5.

== Club career ==
=== Bidvest Wits ===
Mashamaite joined Bidvest Wits when he was on the verge of joining the South African Defence Force in 2005 after signing an apprentice contract and being promoted by then youth coach, Boebie Solomons after he had been at the development structures for two years. He did not make an appearance and was loaned to Brixton-based Stars of Africa Academy under Farouk Khan with the likes of May Mahlangu, Tokelo Rantie and Sibusiso Khumalo. Mashamaite later made his professional debut on 11 March 2007 in a 2–0 loss to Moroka Swallows. He scored his first goal on 29 October 2008 in a 2–1 loss to Mamelodi Sundowns. Mashamaite returned to Wits in the 2008/09. An injury to his captain Sibusiso Mahlangu forced Roger de Sa to assign Mashamaite as a captain temporarily and he later became the permanent captain. Mashamaite scored a brace in a 4–2 win over Mamelodi Sundowns on 16 September 2009 in a space of two minutes between the 72nd and 74th minute, both with his head. He was a key figure when Bidvest Wits won the Nedbank Cup, beating AmaZulu 3–0 at FNB Stadium on 22 May 2010. By the end of his spell with The Students he had 74 starts and 9 goals.

=== Kaizer Chiefs ===
Mashamaite joined Chiefs in July 2011 from Wits to replace the outgoing Valery Nahayo who left for KAA Gent in Belgium. Mashamaite made his official Chiefs debut in a 2–0 win at Moroka Swallows on 17 August 2011. He scored his first goal for the Club in a 2–0 win over Chippa United in September 2012. In the Telkom Knockout and the first ever match between Chiefs and Polokwane City on 5 October 2013, Mashamaite scored an unusual brace, both goals being headers from two corners from Bernard Parker and Knowledge Musona scored the third goal to win 3–0 at the Peter Mokaba Stadium. In the same match, Mashamaite wore protective headgear and had to have stitches on his eyelid after a collision during a Bloemfontein Celtic game and the protective headband was used in order to cover that wound and stop it from opening up again. That was his second brace of his career as the first came in 2009 in a 4–2 win over Mamelodi Sundowns. He later won the Goal.com Player of the Week after being nominated with Thulani Serero, Khama Billiat and Edward Manqele. He helped Chiefs win a league and cup double. In the 2013–14 season, this time finishing runners-up, he played every single league game for Chiefs, a first for his career. On 20 September 2014, Mashamaite scored header which was the solitary goal of the final of the 2014 MTN 8 against Orlando Pirates. On 20 October 2014, he scored a header being the solitary goal against Ajax Cape Town to help Chiefs set a new domestic record of 15 wins in a row. In 2014–15, Mashamaite went 35 games (3,214 minutes) without a booking. Between August 2014 and 24 March 2015, he made 19 blocks, 32 tackles, 127 clearances and 449 interceptions, in the process committing only 7 fouls. He also had a pass completion rate of over 90%, He made 878 successful passes as of 24 March 2015, in total, 560 of which have been forward. Mashamaite was a big winner at the PSL Awards on 17 May 2015, winning Footballer of the Season, Players' Player of the Season and Absa Premiership Defender of the Season in Sandton pocketing R450 000 for his individual contribution towards winning the league and the MTN8.

Mashamaite went for trials in June 2015 on a 10-day trial at New York City with the likes of Frank Lampard and Andrea Pirlo. He later attracted interest from Anorthosis Famagusta and Danish giants Brondby but eventually signed with BK Häcken on 5 August 2015.

=== BK Häcken ===
He made his debut for BK Häcken on a 4–1 win against Halmstad in a league encounter.

=== Supersport United ===
Tefu returns to South African football by joining the side managed by his former coach, Stuart Baxter.

=== Baberwa F.C. ===
On 28 November 2018, Mashamaite signed for ABC Motsepe League team Baberwa F.C.

== International career ==
Mashamaite was given his first national call-up by Pitso Mosimane in 2010. He made his debut on 2 June 2013 in a 2–0 over Lesotho. Mashamaite was part of South Africa's 2014 CHAN squad and he only played one match against Nigeria.

== Style of play ==
FifaPlayerRatings.com described Mashamaite as a player stating that "his default approach is to contain his man due to his below-average aggression. In these cases it might be more advantageous to attempt to dispossess the attacking player, since he's a relatively savvy tackler. Tefu Mashamaite will occasionally read passing lanes and intercept opponent passes because of his comparatively high interceptions rating. He'll excel at smothering attackers on set pieces and corner kicks, and will typically be one of the first players to respond to changes within a play (e.g. clearing a rebound off the post) due to his relatively high reactions rating. Physically, he takes longer than most players to reach top speed, which only exacerbates his comparatively slow pace. He's not as strong as most defenders, but his above-average jumping ability will help him compete for headers.

== Personal life ==
He has two sons Phetolo Nkosana (born 2010) and Tefu Kgosi (born 2016). He got his BA in International Relations and Politics at Wits University in 2005 before joining Wits. His nephew played for the Orlando Pirates youth academy. Mashamaite looks up to Lillian Thuram and he is a basketball fan. In the FIFA 15 video game, Mashamaite is ranked 4,380th which is the top half of all the players in the game. His "Positional Smart" rating is 83 which ranks him the 1,285th best defender and the 766th best centre back in the video game.
