= 2025 Carling Knockout Cup =

Tournament details
- Country: South Africa
- Dates: 3 October 2025 – 6 December 2025
- Teams: 16

Final positions
- Champions: Orlando Pirates
- Runners-up: Marumo Gallants

Tournament statistics
- Matches played: 15
- Goals scored: 37 (2.47 per match)

Awards
- Best player: Mbekezeli Mbokazi

The 2025 Carling Knockout Cup was the third season of the South African soccer competition, the Carling Knockout Cup, under its new sponsored name. It was organised by the Premier Soccer League and Carling and ran from 3 October to 6 December 2025. Orlando Pirates were crowned champions after defeating Marumo Gallants in the final with Relebohile Mofokeng netting the winner in extra time thus Orlando Pirates 1st league cup title in more than 10 years and their second in the competition's history.

== Teams ==
The teams consisted of the 16 teams from the 2025–26 South African Premiership.

- AmaZulu
- Chippa United
- Durban City
- Golden Arrows
- Kaizer Chiefs
- Magesi
- Mamelodi Sundowns
- Marumo Gallants
- Orbit College
- Orlando Pirates
- Polokwane City
- Richards Bay
- Sekhukhune United
- Siwelele
- Stellenbosch
- TS Galaxy

== Results ==
=== Round of 16 ===
3 October 2025	Durban City	4–1 (a.e.t.)	Polokwane City	Chatsworth Stadium, Chatsworth
19:00 SAST	Gcaba 12' 111' 114'; Mkhize 93'	Report	Nkaki 88' (pen.)

4 October 2025	Golden Arrows	3–1	Sekhukhune United	King Goodwill Zwelithini Stadium, Durban
19:00 SAST	Karlese 57'; Maxwele 64'; Jiyane 72'	Report	Grobler 45+1'

4 October 2025	Orlando Pirates	1–0	Siwelele	Orlando Stadium, Soweto
15:00 SAST	Mbokazi 87'	Report

4 October 2025	Orbit College	0–1 (a.e.t.)	TS Galaxy	Olympia Park, Rustenburg
15:00 SAST		Report	Ouamri 109'

4 October 2025	Mamelodi Sundowns	0–0 (a.e.t.) (6–7 p)	Marumo Gallants	Lucas Moripe Stadium, Atteridgeville
20:00 SAST		Report
	Penalties
	Allende (penalty missed); Basadien (penalty missed); Modiba (penalty scored); Shalulile (penalty scored); Santos (penalty scored); Mokoena (penalty scored); Morena (penalty scored); Khoza (penalty scored); Lebusa (penalty missed)		(penalty missed) Clifford; (penalty scored) Mbhele; (penalty scored) Agnikoi; (penalty scored) Msendami; (penalty missed) Sithole; (penalty scored) Chabatsane; (penalty scored) Ncube; (penalty scored) Nhlapo; (penalty scored) Arubi

5 October 2025	Stellenbosch	0–0 (a.e.t.) (5–4 p)	Kaizer Chiefs	Cape Town Stadium, Cape Town
15:00 SAST		Report

5 October 2025	Richards Bay	4–1	Chippa United	Richards Bay Stadium, Richards Bay
15:00 SAST		Report

5 October 2025	AmaZulu	2–3	Magesi	Moses Mabhida Stadium, Durban
17:30 SAST		Report

In the Chiefs-Stellenbosch game, shortly before fulltime and penalties with the game tied 0–0, Chief's goalkeeper Fiacre Ntwari refused to be substituted for Bruce Bvuma. Ntwari saved one penalty, but Chiefs ultimately lost the shootout, and stated that they would address the situation internally.

=== Quarter-finals ===
25 October 2025	Richards Bay	3–1 (a.e.t.)	Durban City	Richards Bay Stadium, Richards Bay
15:00 SAST	Mutizwa 84'; Mbulelo 100'; Mahala 120'		Mokwena 52'

26 October 2025	Golden Arrows	2–1 (a.e.t.)	TS Galaxy	King Zwelithini Stadium, Umlazi
15:00 SAST

28 October 2025	Orlando Pirates	2–1	Magesi	Orlando Stadium, Soweto
19:00 SAST	Moremi 51'; Makgopa 87'		Mokone 90+5'

29 October 2025	Marumo Gallants	4–0	Stellenbosch	Dr. Petrus Molemela Stadium, Bloemfontein
19:00 SAST

=== Semi-finals ===
8 November 2025	Richards Bay	0–1	Orlando Pirates	Moses Mabhida Stadium, Durban
15:00 SAST		Report	Moremi 42'

9 November 2025	Golden Arrows	0–0 (a.e.t.) (2–4 p)	Marumo Gallants	King Zwelithini Stadium, Umlazi.
15:00 SAST

=== Final ===
6 December 2025	Orlando Pirates	1–0 (a.e.t.)	Marumo Gallants	Peter Mokaba Stadium, Polokwane
18:00 SAST	Mofokeng 105'	Report		Referee: Makalima
