= Sinoxolo Kwayiba =

South African soccer player

Personal information
- Date of birth: 15 February 2000 (age 26)
- Place of birth: Gqeberha, South Africa
- Position: Midfielder

Team information
- Current team: Stellenbosch
- Number: 14

Senior career*
Years	Team	Apps	(Gls)
2022–2023	Pretoria Callies	24	(2)
2023–2025	Chippa United	36	(10)
2025–2026	Orlando Pirates	2	(0)
2026	Chippa United	15	(6)
2026–	Stellenbosch	9	(2)

International career^{‡}
2024–	South Africa	5	(1)
- * Club domestic league appearances and goals as of 31 October 2026 ‡ National team caps and goals as of 10 June 2025

Sinoxolo Kwayiba (born 15 February 2000) is a South African professional soccer player who plays as an attacking midfielder for Stellenbosch FC in the South African Premier Division and the South Africa national team.

He hails from Motherwell near Gqeberha. After playing in the 2022–23 National First Division with Pretoria Callies, he was signed by Premier Division side Chippa United in August 2023. Reportedly, Polokwane City had also been interested in the player. He made his first-tier debut in the 2023–24 South African Premier Division.

In June 2024, Kwayiba was named in South Africa's squad for the 2024 COSAFA Cup. He started their first match against Mozambique, and had a chance to score in the closing minutes of the game, but South Africa were held to a draw. Kwayiba also played the match against Botswana.

Having made his breakthrough in the latter half of the 2023–24 season, Kwayiba started 9 of Chippa United's last 11 league games. He also helped Chippa United reach the semi-final of the 2023–24 Nedbank Cup. In May 2024, he was named the Premier Division Player of the Month for April. He was described as a versatile midfielder, a "box-to-box player" who could play the role of a number 6, 8, or 10. Towards the end of the mid-year transfer window, South African media reported on rumours linking Kwayiba to a larger South African club.

In his first four matches of the 2024–25 South African Premier Division, Kwayiba was named "man of the match" in two. He was also named in South Africa's preliminary squad as the 2025 Africa Cup of Nations qualifiers resumed in October 2024.

In June 2025, Sinoxolo was announced as one of the new signings for Orlando Pirates.

== International goals ==
No.	Date	Venue	Opponent	Score	Result	Competition
1.	10 June 2025	Peter Mokaba Stadium, Polokwane, South Africa	Mozambique	1–0	2–0	Friendly

== Honours ==
Orlando Pirates

- MTN 8: 2025
- Carling Knockout: 2025
