= Ace Ntsoelengoe Stadium =

Multi-use stadium in Randfontein, Gauteng, South Africa

Mohlakeng Stadium
- Interactive map of Mohlakeng Stadium
- Location: Mohlakeng, Rand West City Local Municipality, Gauteng
- Coordinates: 26.232045°S 27.689582°E

Ace Ntsoelengoe Stadium is a multi-use stadium in Mohlakeng, Gauteng, South Africa. Formerly known as Mohlakeng Stadium, the stadium was renamed in 2016 in honor of Patrick "Ace" Ntsoelengoe, widely regarded as one of the best South African footballers of all time. As of September 2025, the Rand West City Local Municipality said that it hoped to upgrade the stadium to the standards of the Premier Soccer League (PSL), with the goal of attracting a PSL team to move to the stadium.
