= 2007 Telkom Knockout =

Tournament details
- Country: South Africa
- Dates: 26 September-1 December
- Teams: 16

Final positions
- Champions: Kaizer Chiefs (11th title)
- Runners-up: Mamelodi Sundowns

The 2007 Telkom Knockout was the 26th edition of the Telkom Knockout, a South African cup competition comprising the 16 teams in the Premiership. It took place between September and December 2007. The final was won by Kaizer Chiefs, who defeated Mamelodi Sundowns.

The final ended goalless after extra time, and saw numerous glaring misses, before being settled on penalties. Chiefs took home R4.25 million in prize money. Chiefs goalkeeper Itumeleng Khune saved two penalties to help his team to the title.

== Results ==
=== Final ===
1 December 2007

Kaizer Chiefs	0–0 (a.e.t.)	Mamelodi Sundowns
Penalties
	3–2

Loftus Versfeld Stadium
Attendance: 52,000
