= 2021 Carling Black Label Cup =

- Event: Carling Black Label Cup
Kaizer Chiefs	Orlando Pirates
0	0
- Kaizer Chiefs won 4–3 in a penalty shoot-out
- Date: 1 August 2021
- Venue: Orlando Stadium, Soweto

The 2021 Carling Black Label Cup was the ninth edition of the Carling Black Label Cup to be held. The competition was won by Kaizer Chiefs.

== Venue ==
The Orlando Stadium was chosen to host this annual event. The stadium located in Orlando, the Soweto area of Johannesburg, South Africa
