= 2017 Carling Black Label Cup =

- Event: Carling Black Label Cup
Kaizer Chiefs	Orlando Pirates
(South Africa)	(South Africa)
1	0
- Date: 29 July 2017
- Venue: FNB Stadium, Soweto

The 2017 Carling Black Label Cup was the seventh edition of the Carling Black Label Cup to be held.

A South African beer brand Black Label started the "Be The Coach" where the fans had the opportunity to elect the starting 11 of their desired players from the two Soweto derby arch rivals, Orlando Pirates, and Kaizer Chiefs, which are two of the most successful and largest soccer clubs in South Africa.

== Venue ==
The FNB Stadium was chosen to host this once a year event. The FNB Stadium, known as Soccer City during the 2010 FIFA World Cup, is a stadium located in Nasrec, the Soweto area of Johannesburg, South Africa.

== Match ==
=== Details ===
29 July 2017
15h30

Kaizer Chiefs (South Africa)	1 - 0	(South Africa) Orlando Pirates
10' Bernard Parker

FNB Stadium, Soweto
