= 2003 Coca-Cola Cup =

2003 Coca-Cola Knockout
Tournament details
- Country: South Africa
- Teams: 16

Final positions
- Champions: Kaizer Chiefs
- Runners-up: Silver Stars

The 2003 Coca-Cola Cup was the 22nd edition of the Coca-Cola Cup, a South African cup competition comprising the 16 teams in the Premiership. Kaizer Chiefs won the title for the ninth time in their third consecutive appearance in the final, defeating Silver Stars 2–0.

Chiefs took home R2-million in prize money, while Stars earned R1-million. As of 2002, the Coca-Cola Cup was the richest cup competition in Africa.

== Results ==
=== Final ===
7 December 2003

Kaizer Chiefs	2–0	Silver Stars
Fredericks 55'; Mayo 90+2'
