= Lewis Macha =

Zambian footballer (born 1992)

Personal information
- Date of birth: 22 February 1992 (age 34)
- Place of birth: Maramba, Zambia
- Height: 1.78 m (5 ft 10 in)
- Position: Forward

Youth career
- 2000–2004: Young Green Buffaloes
- 2006–2010: Kalomo Jetters

Senior career*
Years	Team	Apps	(Gls)
2010	Choma Rangers	10	(5)
2011	Nchanga Rangers	12	(4)
2012–2013	Zanaco	32	(11)
2014–2015	UD Songo	11	(7)
2015–2016	Ferroviario de Maputo	40	(16)
2016–2017	Kaizer Chiefs	4	(0)
2017–2018	Baroka	9	(2)
2018	Royal Eagles	1	(0)
2018–2019	ZESCO United		

International career
2012	Zambia	1	(0)
- * Club domestic league appearances and goals

Lewis Macha (born 22 February 1992) is a Zambian footballer who plays as a forward.

== Club career ==
=== Choma Rangers ===
Macha joined Rangers in 2010. He scored his first goal on 24 April 2010, a winning goal in the 86th minute in a 3--2 win over Red Arrows. Rangers finished 12th on the log.

=== Nchanga Rangers ===
Macha joined Rangers in 2011. He scored his first goal in the 36th minute in a 1--1 draw against Green Eagles. He finished 4th with Rangers.
