= 2014 Telkom Knockout =

Tournament details
- Country: South Africa
- Dates: 3 October-29 November
- Teams: 16

Final positions
- Champions: SuperSport United
- Runners-up: Platinum Stars

The 2014 Telkom Knockout was the 33rd edition of the Telkom Knockout, a South African cup competition comprising the 16 teams in the Premiership. It took place between October and November 2014. The final was won by SuperSport United, who defeated Platinum Stars.

The final, contested by two relatively poorly-supported teams, is considered one of the best finals in South African soccer history. Stars scored first through Robert Ng’ambi, before Clayton Daniels equalised with a penalty 10 minutes before half-time.

The game reached extra-time with the score 1–1. Daniels scored a second penalty for SuperSport before Stars's Mogakolodi Ngele equalised with a volley from the edge of the area. Stars then earned a penalty, with SuperSports Ronwen Williams saving both the initial penalty from Eleazar Rodgers, and then an excellent save from the rebound attempt.

SuperSport then went up the other end, scoring the winner through Thuso Phala to take the cup.

== Results ==
=== Final ===
29 November 201

SuperSport United	3–2	Platinum Stars
	Report

Orlando Stadium
