= Eliakim Khumalo =

South African soccer player

Personal information
- Full name: Eliakim Boy Khumalo
- Date of birth: 1940
- Place of birth: South Africa
- Date of death: 27 August 1996 (aged 56)
- Place of death: Soweto, South Africa
- Position: Midfielder

Senior career*
Years	Team	Apps	(Gls)
1959–1971	Moroka Swallows	216	(87)
1971–1973	Kaizer Chiefs	90	(36)
Total		306	(123)

International career
1963–1973	Transvaal	30	(12)
- * Club domestic league appearances and goals

Elkiam Khumalo (1940 – 27 August 1996) was a South African football midfielder who played for Moroka Swallows and Kaizer Chiefs. He was shot during a hijacking in 1996. He was the father of Doctor Khumalo.

== Club career ==
Khumalo played for Moroka Swallows in the First Division where he helped them win their only SA Soccer Championship in 1965 and later Kaizer Chiefs in NPSL being one of its first recruits in 1971 and also finishing as a runner up in that season.

=== Nickname ===
He was nicknamed "Pro" or "Professor" for his ability to read, dictate play, his skill and intelligence.

== International career ==
Khumalo also represented Transvaal at the 1963 and 1973 Africa Games.

== Coaching career ==
Khumalo coached Chiefs six times and led them to 3 NPSL titles, 3 BP Top 8 titles, 2 Nedbank Cup titles and 2 Sales House Cup titles. He also coached Kaizer Chiefs development sides where his son, Doctor Khumalo excelled and rose to be one of South Africa's best midfielders. He also discovered 19-year-old Thabang Lebese in 1992.

== Personal life ==
He married Mabel Moagi (1943/44–2020) in 1964 at Lutheran Church in Jabuvu. The couple had two children, a daughter Fikile and a son Doctor (born 1967).

== Death ==
A few months after his son won the Africa Cup of Nations, Khumalo died on 27 August 1996 in hospital when he was shot during a hijacking outside his home in Soweto. He was shot in the back and his Volkswagen was stolen. Nelson Mandela sent a letter of condolence to Khumalo's wife reading, "I learnt with shock of the fatal attack on your husband yesterday. Eliakim was an example and role model to all the young people of this country more especially those associated with football. His death is a tragic loss to us all. The police will leave no stone unturned to ensure that the perpetrators of this deed are brought to book. To you and your family, I convey my sincere condolences in this hour of grief and sorrow". In 1997 his hijackers, Lawrence Mazimba and Samson Masithulele were caught.

== See also ==
- Kaizer Chiefs F.C
