= 2009 Telkom Knockout =

Tournament details
- Country: South Africa
- Dates: 13 March-10 April
- Teams: 16

Final positions
- Champions: Kaizer Chiefs (12th title)
- Runners-up: Ajax Cape Town

The 2009 Telkom Knockout was the 28th edition of the Telkom Knockout, a South African cup competition comprising the 16 teams in the Premiership. It took place between March and April 2009. The final was won by Kaizer Chiefs, who defeated defending champions Ajax Cape Town.

The final was Ajax's second of the season, following their 6–0 defeat in the 2009 MTN 8.

== Results ==
=== Final ===
10 April 2009

Ajax Cape Town	1–2	Kaizer Chiefs
Sibisi		Masango; Musona

Kings Park Stadium, Durban
Attendance: 50,000
