= 2011 Telkom Knockout =

Tournament details
- Country: South Africa
- Dates: 21 October-10 December
- Teams: 16

Final positions
- Champions: Orlando Pirates
- Runners-up: Wits University

The 2011 Telkom Knockout was the 30th edition of the Telkom Knockout, a South African cup competition comprising the 16 teams in the Premiership. It took place between October and November 2014. The final was won by Orlando Pirates, who defeated Wits University.

This was Pirate's seventh appearance in the final, but only their first win. The game was also notable for a confrontation between Pirate's Benni McCarthy and the Wits coaching staff of Eric Tinkler and Roger de Sa minutes after the end of the game, with Pirate's coach Júlio César Leal having to intervene to prevent a fist fight.

== Results ==
=== Final ===
10 December 2011

| Wits University | 1–3 | Orlando Pirates |

Moses Mabhida Stadium, Durban
