= Ace Khuse =

South African footballer (born 1963)

Personal information
- Full name: Donald Themba Khuse
- Date of birth: 8 September 1963 (age 63)
- Place of birth: Mohlakeng, Johannesburg, South Africa
- Position: Midfielder

Youth career
- Lincoln City

Senior career*
Years	Team	Apps	(Gls)
1983–1986	Orlando Pirates	67	(12)
1986–1989	Mamelodi Sundowns	174	(51)
1989–1993	Kaizer Chiefs	82	(2)
1993–1996	Gençlerbirliği	23	(1)
1996–1997	Antalyaspor		
Total		346	(66)

International career
1992–1995	South Africa	16	(0)

Managerial career
- 1999–: Kaizer Chiefs (assistant)
- 2012: Kaizer Chiefs (interim)
- * Club domestic league appearances and goals

Donald Themba "Ace" Khuse (born 8 September 1963 in Johannesburg) is a South African former soccer player. Married to Innocentia Mampateng Motsumi, has a son Thabiso Khuse and daughter Nonhlahla Khuse.
