= Thomas Johnson (South African soccer) =

South African soccer player and manager

Personal information
- Full name: Thomas Mhlupheki Maduna kaMchunu
- Date of birth: 1942
- Place of birth: Northern Natal, South Africa
- Date of death: 23 February 2011 (aged 69)
- Place of death: Johannesburg, South Africa
- Position: Midfielder

Youth career
- Heidelberg Happy Hearts
- Springs Home Sweepers
- Pimville Real Rovers
- Mofolo Dynamos
- Moroka Swallows-Mbanya Group

Senior career*
Years	Team	Apps	(Gls)
- Orlando Pirates
1971–1973	Kaizer Chiefs (player-coach)	24	(10)

Managerial career
- 1973–?: Gaborone United
- 1973–?: Botswana
- * Club domestic league appearances and goals

Thomas Johnson (1942 – 23 February 2011) was a South African soccer player and manager.

He was one of the co-founders of Kaizer Chiefs, the club's first captain and the first head coach of the Kaizer Chiefs team. He also competed in the first ever Soweto derby on 24 January 1970, only 17 days after Chiefs' formation.

== Playing career ==
A midfielder, he played for Orlando Pirates and Kaizer Chiefs.

== Coaching career ==
Johnson had coaching licenses from Germany, England and Brazil. Johnson attended a coaching courses in Germany and came back with videos to pass on his knowledge to other players. Whilst head coach of Kaizer Chiefs, he won South Africa's national cup competition three times. He was the technical director of Dona's Mates Youth Academy in Orange Farm.

== Personal life ==
Johnson was married to Dimakatso, had eight children, seven grandchildren and on one great-grandchild.

== Death ==
Johnson died from prostate cancer in February 2011. He was buried in Soweto.
