= 2006 Telkom Knockout =

Tournament details
- Country: South Africa
- Teams: 16

Final positions
- Champions: Silver Stars (1st title)
- Runners-up: Ajax Cape Town

The 2006 Telkom Knockout was the 25th edition of the Telkom Knockout, a South African cup competition comprising the 16 teams in the Premiership. The final was won by Silver Stars, who defeated Ajax Cape Town 3–1 in the final., with Stars' Simba Marumo scoring a hat trick.

The competition was the first under the new sponsor name, the Telkom Knockout, having been called the Coca Cola Cup from 2001 to 2005.

== Results ==
=== Final ===
16 December 2006

Silver Stars	3–1	Ajax Cape Town

Super Stadium
