= Zane Moosa =

South African soccer player

Personal information
- Date of birth: 23 September 1968 (age 58)
- Place of birth: Marabastad, South Africa
- Position: Midfielder

Senior career*
Years	Team	Apps	(Gls)
1986–1989	Wits University	90	(17)
1989–1997	Mamelodi Sundowns	179	(29)
1993–1994	→ Avendale Athletico (loan)	17	(4)
1997–1998	Al-Ahli	11	(0)
1998–1999	Kaizer Chiefs	3	(0)
Total		300	(50)

International career
1992–1996	South Africa	5	(0)
- * Club domestic league appearances and goals

Zane Moosa (born 23 September 1968) is a South African former soccer player who played at both professional and international levels as a midfielder. Moosa played club football in South Africa and Saudi Arabia for Wits University, Mamelodi Sundowns, Avendale Athletico, Al-Ahli and Kaizer Chiefs; he also earned five caps for the South African national side between 1992 and 1996. He was part of the squad that won the 1996 African Cup of Nations.

Moosa made his professional debut on 21 June 1986 in a 1-1 draw against Kaizer Chiefs which would be his last club.

Mossa is a Muslim. His older brother Essop Moosa was also a footballer.
