= 1991 BP Top 8 =

Tournament details
- Teams: 8

Final positions
- Champions: Kaizer Chiefs (9th title)
- Runners-up: Jomo Cosmos

The 1991 BP Top 8 was the 20th edition of the competition, then known as the BP Top 8 for sponsorship reasons, featuring the top 8-placed teams at the conclusion of the National Soccer League (NSL) season.

It was won for the ninth time by Kaizer Chiefs, who defeated Jomo Cosmos 4–3 in the final. The final was a classic, finishing 3–3 at full time, with Phil Masinga scoring three goals for the losing side. It was remembered by Lucas Radebe as his favourite game.

== Teams ==
The following 8 teams are listed according to their final position on the league table in the previous season of the National Soccer League.

1. Mamelodi Sundowns
2. Kaizer Chiefs
3. Orlando Pirates
4. Moroka Swallows
5. Jomo Cosmos
6. Qwa Qwa Stars
7. Umtata Bucks
8. Hellenic

== Final ==
15:00 SAST

Kaizer Chiefs	4–3 (a.e.t.)	Jomo Cosmos

FNB Stadium
