= Essop Moosa =

South African soccer player

Personal information
- Date of birth: 1952 or 1953 (age 72–73)
- Position: Left winger

Senior career*
| Years | Team | Apps | (Gls) |
- Sundowns
| 1972 | Berea Park | | |
- Swaraj
- Bluebells
- Durban Aces
- Adriatica
- Benoni United
- Pretoria Callies
- * Club domestic league appearances and goals

Essop Moosa (born 1952/1953), nicknamed Smiley and also known as Arthur Williams, is a South African former soccer player and racing commentator.

== Early and personal life ==
Moosa's paternal grandfather was from Surat in Gujarat, British India. Under South Africa's apartheid race laws, Moosa was classified as "Indian", although his father was classified as "White" and his mother as "Coloured". His younger brother Zane was also a footballer. Moosey was nicknamed "Smiley".

== Playing career ==
Moosa played for Sundowns at the age of 16. In November 1972 he appeared in a Cup competition between two teams from the whites-only National Football League, representing Berea Park, playing under the pseudonym Arthur Williams. After the opposing team Rangers became suspicious, and journalists investigated and revealed his real identity, he was visited by the Special Branch and told not to "try it again". By doing so he became the first non-white player to play for an all-white team in South Africa.

Moosa later said that the incident and others under apartheid sent him to a psychiatric hospital for a time.

In the mid-1970s Moosa had a trial in England with Crystal Palace, and was offered a contract by West Ham United, but failed to gain a work permit for the transfer.

Moosa was voted the SA Football Federation's Player of the Year, for three consecutive years – 1972, 1973, and 1974.

In addition to Sundowns and Berea Park, Moosa also played for Swaraj, Bluebells, Durban Aces, Adriatica, Benoni United, and Pretoria Callies.

== Commentating career ==
Moosa later worked as a racing commentator, coming out of retirement in June 2018 following a 15-year absence.

== Sources ==
- Ian Hawkey (2010). Feet of the Chameleon: The Story of African Football. Portico.
