= Mohlakeng =

Mohlakeng Didi
- Location within Gauteng Location within South Africa
- Coordinates: 26°13′32″S 27°41′49″E
- Country: South Africa
- Province: Gauteng
- District: West Rand
- Municipality: Rand West City Local Municipality

Area
  - Total: 7.20 km^{2} (2.78 sq mi)

Population (2011)
  - Total: 55,033
  - Density: 7,640/km^{2} (19,800/sq mi)

Racial makeup (2011)
  - Black African: 98.7%
  - Coloured: 0.7%
  - Indian/Asian: 0.1%
  - White: 0.3%
  - Other: 0.2%

First languages (2011)
  - Tswana: 55.0%
  - Xhosa: 12.6%
  - Zulu: 9.3%
  - Sotho: 7.2%
  - Other: 15.9%
- Time zone: UTC+2 (SAST)
- Postal code (street): 1759
- PO box: 1766

Mohlakeng is a township west of Johannesburg in Gauteng, South Africa.

== History ==
The township was established in 1954. The new location of Mohlakeng was established after African residents of the then old Randfontein township of Madubulaville was abolished by the apartheid regime to make way for the industrial site closer to Randfontein town.

== Geography ==
Mohlakeng is where the large part of the Randfontein population is situated. It lies 7 kilometres south of Randfontein, and around 38 kilometres west of Johannesburg. Mohlakeng has now grown about 15% in size in 2012 as compared to 2002. The former Executive Mayor of the West Rand District Municipality hails from Mohlakeng.

== Infrastructure ==
The community is served with Umphakathi mall, a police station, Mohlakeng Medical Centre, a refurbished Ramosa Hall, a soccer stadium and a recreation centre. Mohlakeng is surrounded by Soweto in the east, Randfontein in the north and Westonaria in the south. Mohlakeng is accessible by the R28 Main Reef Road and the R559 Main Road.

== Notable people ==
Notable people from Mohlakeng include:

- Peter Mathebula, the first African World WBA Light-Weight Boxing Champion
- Oupa Manyisa, soccer player
- Donald Khuse, soccer player
- Patrick Ntsoelengoe, soccer player
- Thembi Kgatlana, soccer player
- Makhehlene Makhaula, soccer player
