= 1992 BP Top 8 =

Tournament details
- Teams: 8

Final positions
- Champions: Kaizer Chiefs (10th title)
- Runners-up: Mamelodi Sundowns

The BP Top 8 1992 was the 21st edition of the competition, then known as the BP Top 8 for sponsorship reasons, featuring the top 8-placed teams at the conclusion of the National Soccer League (NSL) season.

It was won for the tenth time by Kaizer Chiefs. Chiefs, managed by Jeff Butler, won the treble that season after also winning the 1992 Bob Save Superbowl and 1992 NSL.

== Teams ==
The following 8 teams are listed according to their final position on the league table in the previous season of the National Soccer League.

1. Kaizer Chiefs
2. Mamelodi Sundowns
3. Fairway Stars
4. Umtata Bush Bucks
5. Orlando Pirates
6. Moroka Swallows
7. Jomo Cosmos
8. Hellenic

== Final ==
Kaizer Chiefs	1–0	Mamelodi Sundowns
