= 2010 Telkom Knockout =

Tournament details
- Country: South Africa

Final positions
- Champions: Kaizer Chiefs

Tournament statistics
- Matches played: 15

The 2010 Telkom Knockout was a football (soccer) knockout competition which comprised the 16 teams in the South African Premier Soccer League. It was the 19th tournament, and the fifth under the Telkom Knockout name. The tournament is effectively South Africa's league cup, as entry is open only to clubs in the top league. The cup is usually played in the first half of the season. The tournament began on 23 October, and it ended on 4 December 2010. Kaizer Chiefs won their 9th title, by defeating Orlando Pirates 3–0 in the final at Soccer City.

In all matches there has to be a winner on the day, which will be decided if there is a winner after full-time (90 minutes). If teams are tied at full-time, then extra time is played; penalties will decide the winner if the scores are still even (there is no golden goal rule).

== Teams ==
The 16 teams that competed in the Telkom Knockout competition are: (listed in alphabetical order).

- 1. Ajax Cape Town
- 2. AmaZulu
- 3. Bloemfontein Celtic
- 4. Free State Stars
- 5. Golden Arrows
- 6. Kaizer Chiefs
- 7. Mamelodi Sundowns
- 8. Maritzburg United
- 9. Moroka Swallows
- 10. Mpumalanga Black Aces
- 11. Orlando Pirates
- 12. Platinum Stars
- 13. Santos
- 14. Supersport United
- 15. Vasco da Gama
- 16. Wits

== Prize money ==
- The Telkom Knockout is the highest paying cup competition in Africa with a grand total prize money of R 14 200 000.00.
- Each team taking part in the Telkom Knockout will receive a Participation Fee of R 250 000.00

=== First-round losers ===
- Prize Money: R 200 000.00
- Participation Fee: R 250 000.00
- Total: R 450 000.00 for 8 teams each

=== Losing quarterfinalists ===
- Prize Money: R 400 000.00
- Participation Fee: R 250 000.00
- Total: R 650 000.00 for 4 teams each

=== Losing Semi-Finalists ===
- Prize Money: R 750 000.00
- Participation Fee: R 250 000.00
- Total: R 1 000 000.00 for 2 teams each

=== Final – runner up ===
- Prize Money: R 1 500 000.00
- Participation Fee: R 250 000.00
- Total: R 1 750 000.00

=== Final – winner ===
- Prize Money: R 4 000 000.00
- Participation Fee: R 250 000.00
- Total: R 4 250 000.00

=== ‘'Total prize money'’ ===
- Total Prize Money: R 10 200 000.00
- Total Participation Fee: R 4 000 000.00
- Grand Total: R 14 200 000.00

== Results ==
=== First round ===
The draw for the first round was done on 11 October 2010. The first round matches took place on 23, 24 and 27 October.

23 October 2010

Golden Arrows	0–1	Orlando Pirates

Chatsworth Stadium, Durban
23 October 2010

Platinum Stars	0–1	Mamelodi Sundowns

Moruleng Stadium, Moruleng
23 October 2010

AmaZulu	0–2	Kaizer Chiefs

Moses Mabhida Stadium, Durban
23 October

Supersport United	1–0	Vasco da Gama

Super Stadium, Atteridgeville
24 October 2010

Bloemfontein Celtic	1–2	Maritzburg United

Seisa Ramabodu Stadium, Botshabelo
24 October 2010

Wits	0–1	Santos

Bidvest Stadium, Johannesburg
27 October 2010

Ajax Cape Town	0–1	Free State Stars

Athlone Stadium, Cape Town
27 October 2010

Moroka Swallows	1–3	Mpumalanga Black Aces

Dobsonville Stadium, Johannesburg

=== Quarter-finals ===
The draw for the quarter-finals was done on 28 October 2010. The quarter-finals took place on 6 and 7 November.

6 November 2010

Kaizer Chiefs	2–0	Free State Stars

Rand Stadium, Johannesburg
6 November 2010

Supersport United	0–3	Orlando Pirates

Loftus Versfeld Stadium, Pretoria
6 November 2010

Santos	1–0	Mpumalanga Black Aces

Athlone Stadium, Cape Town
7 November 2010

Maritzburg United	2–0	Mamelodi Sundowns

Harry Gwala Stadium, Pietermaritzburg

=== Semi-finals ===
The draw for the semi-finals was done on 7 November 2010, following the Maritzburg United vs Mamelodi Sundowns match. The semi-finals took place on 20 and 21 November.

20 November 2010

Kaizer Chiefs	1–0	Santos

Peter Mokaba Stadium, Polokwane
21 November 2010

Maritzburg United	0–3	Orlando Pirates

Chatsworth Stadium, Durban

=== Final ===
4 December 2010

Orlando Pirates	0–3	Kaizer Chiefs
		Ngcobo '11' '64' Tshabalala '72'

Soccer City, Johannesburg

== See also ==
- Telkom Knockout
- South African Football Association
