= Amakhosi Stadium =

Football stadium in South Africa

- Interactive map of Amakhosi Stadium
- Location: Krugersdorp, Gauteng, South Africa
- Coordinates: 26.102°S 27.778°E
- Owner: Lefika Emerging Equity
- Operator: Kaizer Chiefs
- Capacity: 55,000

Construction
- Cost: estimated: R700 million

Tenant
- Kaizer Chiefs

Amakhosi Stadium was the planned future home venue of South African football club Kaizer Chiefs. The stadium, was to be part of a greater sports precinct being developed in Krugersdorp, roughly 40 km West from the central part of Johannesburg.

Initially the sports precinct was planned not only to host Kaizer Chiefs and the Kaizer Chiefs Youth Development Programme, but also to include a: cricket field, rugby stadium, sports hotel, and a retail shopping centre. The construction of the stadium was planned to start already in September 2006, with a total cost of R695 million.

In fall 2006 the project became upgraded to cost R1.2 billion (£105 million), due to demands from Kaizer Chiefs, for the stadium to comply with FIFA standards.

Kaizer Chiefs announced in August 2010, that the project had been redesigned, to make it cheaper and possible to fund, so that construction work could start in September 2010, and be finalized in August 2012. If the revised plan from April 2010 was approved by Kaizer Chiefs, the new stadium will have a price tag of R700 million, and the capacity will now be reduced from 55,000 to 35,000 seats. Due to problems with financial funding the project stalled and construction never commenced. The exact details and status for the project remain unknown but for now are stalled indefinitely.

== Construction plans ==
The idea to construct the stadium was born already in 2003, when the Mogale City Municipality first announced a plan to renovate the Bob van Reenen Stadium in Krugersdorp. During the past years, the Kaizer Chiefs F.C. had used no less than 9 stadiums in Johannesburg as their home venue, and they now wanted to settle down with a new permanent home venue. Thus, an agreement was reached with Mogale City Municipality, to cancel the initial renovation plan, and instead pursue the construction of a new big stadium on the site, to be used as the home venue of Kaizer Chiefs. As the team is nicknamed the Amakhosi, and because Kaizer Chiefs initially also offered to be one of the shareholders to fund the construction costs, the planned project was named Amakhosi Stadium. The property development company Lefika Emerging Equity (represented by CEO Bobby Motaung, who also works as the manager of Kaizer Chiefs), started in March 2006 to pay Mogale City Municipality for a 90-year-long leasing contract of the stadium ground. In August 2006, an official stadium construction plan was announced, with Kaizer Chiefs, Mogale City Municipality, and Lefika Emerging Equity, mentioned as joint shareholders. This first official construction plan, had scheduled the new stadiums completion date for December 2008, at a total cost of R695 million.

=== First revision of the project ===
From the start, the stadium had been planned at a cost of R680 million, with a capacity of 55,000 seats. In fall 2006 the project became upgraded to cost R1.2 billion (£105 million), due to demands from Kaizer Chiefs, for the stadium to comply with FIFA standards. The stakeholders behind the project, were also reported in March 2007 to negotiate with the Joburg World Cup organisers, about the award of a possible status as "official training venue for the 2010 FIFA World Cup", and in that regards also needed to update the project to comply with all FIFA standards. Due to the increased cost for the project, Lefika Emerging Equity however in the following years failed to fund the project, with the promised completion date first being announced to be December 2008, and then in 2008 getting postponed to an expected completion date in June 2010. The revised construction plan, also outlined two phases, with the stadium construction to be completed first. The rest of the sports complex, which was planned to include a: cricket field, rugby stadium, sports hotel, and a retail shopping centre — specializing in sports equipment, would only be developed at a later stage, several years after construction of the stadium. It was confirmed, that the Gauteng Provincial Government in no way was a financial partner of the project, but had signed a pledge to improve the road and rail access to-and-from the planned stadium -including the construction of a nearby parking lot for 3000 cars.

The stadium developers had set time lines for the Amakhosi stadium, to open its doors for the public in June 2010. Thus the city now impatiently awaits, the promised construction of Amakhosi Stadium to start.

=== Second revision of the project ===
The planned stadium was redesigned into a cheaper project, with a new price tag at R700 million, and the capacity being reduced from 55,000 to 35,000 seats. Kaiser Chief did a brief press statement in April 2010, where they clarified, that stadium developer Lefika Emerging Equity had asked Kaizer Chiefs, to approve a new redesign of the stadium, in order to make it more realistic to fund. The construction work had been postponed for several years, due to the stadium developer facing difficulties to raise the needed funding. It was also clarified, that Kaiser Chiefs now only were interested to be the future tenant of the stadium, with Lefika Emerging Equity being the stadiums sole official owner.

In August 2010, Kaiser Chiefs announced, that construction of Amakhosi Stadium was expected only to start in fall 2010, and to be finalised by August 2012. For the football seasons in 2010–12, the team instead now planned to use Rand Stadium as their home venue. By November 2010, the football club however abandoned to use Rand Stadium, due to poor transportational infrastructures and a low spectator attendance. The club at the same time declared, that they expected there would soon be an official announcement of a new timeline, for construction of the long time planned Amakhosi Stadium.
