= Lawrence Chelin =

South African footballer (1958–2020)

Personal information
- Date of birth: 24 August 1958
- Date of death: 23 June 2020 (aged 61)
- Height: 5 ft 7 in (1.70 m)
- Position: Midfielder

Senior career*
| Years | Team | Apps | (Gls) |
- Arcadia Shepherds
- Durban United
- Durban City
| 1981 | Atlanta Chiefs | 24 | (1) |

International career
| 1976 | South Africa Invitational XI | 1 | (4) |
| 1977 | South Africa | 1 | (0) |
- * Club domestic league appearances and goals

Lawrence Chelin (24 August 1958 – 23 June 2020) was a South African professional soccer player who played as a midfielder.

== Career ==
Chelin played for Arcadia Shepherds‚ Durban United and Durban City, as well as for American team the Atlanta Chiefs in 1981. With Durban City he won the National Soccer League in 1985 and 1986.

He also played for the multiracial South Africa Invitational XI in 1976, and for the national team in 1977.

He died on 23 June 2020 from leukemia.

== Style of play ==
Former South Africa captain Neil Tovey described Chelin as similar to Eden Hazard, being "skilful [sic] and unbelievably quick, especially over the first five metres".
