= 2000 Bob Save Superbowl =

South African football tournament season

2000 Bob Save Super Bowl
Tournament details
- Country: South Africa

Final positions
- Champions: Kaizer Chiefs
- Runners-up: Mamelodi Sundowns

The 2000 Bob Save Superbowl was the 2000 season of the South African club football (soccer) knockout tournament, then known as the Bob Save Superbowl for sponsorship reasons.

Kaizer Chiefs defeated Mamelodi Sundowns 1–0 in the final, denying Sundowns a season treble after they won the 1999-2000 Premiership and 2000 Telkom Charity Cup.

== Results ==
=== Final ===
10 June 2000

Kaizer Chiefs	1–0	Mamelodi Sundowns
Nomvete 44'

FNB Stadium, Johannesburg
Attendance: 80,000
