= Luvolwethu Mpeta =

South African soccer player

Personal information
- Full name: Luvolwethu Mpeta
- Date of birth: 13 January 1990 (age 36)
- Place of birth: Bloemfontein, South Africa
- Height: 1.65 m (5 ft 5 in)
- Position: Left-back

Team information
- Current team: Tshakhuma Tsha Madzivhandila

Youth career
- 2008–2010: North-West University

Senior career*
Years	Team	Apps	(Gls)
2010–2012	FC AK		
2012–2015	Platinum Stars	55	(0)
2015–2016	SuperSport United	23	(1)
2016–2018	Platinum Stars	21	(0)
2019–2020	University of Pretoria	3	(0)
2021–	Tshakhuma Tsha Madzivhandila	29	(0)

International career^{‡}
2009	South Africa U-20	2	(0)
2010	South Africa U-23		
- * Club domestic league appearances and goals as of 7 October 2022 ‡ National team caps and goals as of 4 July 2016

Luvolwethu Mpeta (born 13 January 1990) is a South African footballer who plays as a left-back for Tshakhuma Tsha Madzivhandila.

== Club career ==
=== North-West University ===
Mpeta played for the North-West University soccer team from 2008 to 2010 before graduating with a Diploma in Sports Science.

=== Platinum Stars ===
On 30 July 2012, Mpeta joined Platinum Stars on a three-year contract, after playing a friendly with them against Bidvest Wits.

In January 2015, Mpeta rejected an offer by Platinum Stars to renew his contract with interest in him from SuperSport United and Bloemfontein Celtic.

=== SuperSport United ===
On 20 January 2015, Mpeta signed a pre-contract with SuperSport United before SuperSport United agreed terms with Platinum Stars for his transfer.

== International career ==
Mpeta played for South Africa U20 and for South Africa U23.

Mpeta was called up to the South Africa senior squad in November 2014, ahead of the 2015 AFCON qualifying matches against Sudan and Nigeria, but did not play, with the coach preferring to play Sibusiso Khumalo.
