= Lehlohonolo Seema =

Mosotho footballer (born 1980)

Personal information
- Full name: Lehlohonolo Simon Seema
- Date of birth: 9 June 1980 (age 46)
- Place of birth: Mafeteng, Lesotho
- Height: 1.77 m (5 ft 9 1/2 in)
- Positions: Defender; midfielder

Senior career*
Years	Team	Apps	(Gls)
1994	Chelsea Maseru	26	(2)
1995–1997	Matlama Maseru	47	(3)
1997–1998	Bantu United	26	(0)
1998–2006	Bloemfontein Celtic	113	(8)
2006–2011	Orlando Pirates	63	(1)
2010	→ Mpumalanga Black Aces (loan)	1	(0)

International career
1998–2008	Lesotho	23	(2)

Managerial career
- 2016–2017: Bloemfontein Celtic
- 2018–2020: Bloemfontein Celtic
- 2020: Chippa United
- 2021: Black Leopards
- 2021: Chippa United
- 2021–2022: Lamontville Golden Arrows
- 2023: Polokwane City
- 2023–2025: Sekhukhune United
- 2025–2026: Siwelele
- * Club domestic league appearances and goals

Lehlohonolo Seema (born 9 June 1980) is a retired Mosotho footballer who played as a defender and midfielder. He began his coaching career at Bloemfontein Celtic where he was Assistant Manager in 2013. He went on to manage Black Leopards, Lamontville Golden Arrows, Chippa United, Polokwane City, Sekhukhune United and Siwelele in the South African Premiership.

== Career ==
Joining South African team Bloemfontein Celtic in the 1998/99 season, he moved to Orlando Pirates in 2006. Having previously captained Bloemfontein Celtic, he was a captain of Orlando Pirates and retired from the club on 1 July 2011.

== International career ==
The star of the Lesotho national team, Seema was their only player who in 2003 played club football abroad. In 2001, he scored the winning goal from a penalty kick in the 87th minute of an African Cup of Nations qualifier versus Zimbabwe in Bulawayo to give Lesotho a famous victory.

== Coaching career ==
Two weeks after being dismissed by Sekhukhune United in March 2025, Seema helped Lesotho club Bantu FC to the People's Cup.

In July 2025, Seema took charge of newly-formed Siwelele. Seema did not get the benefit of a pre-season, and the club started slowly. The position stabilised in the latter part of the club's first season in the Premiership.

Seema was dismissed by Siwelele following a slow start to the 2026–27 season.

== Career statistics ==
=== International ===
Appearances and goals by national team and year
National team	Year	Apps	Goals
Lesotho	1998	4	1
Lesotho	1999	2	0
Lesotho	2000	7	0
Lesotho	2001	2	1
Lesotho	2002	1	0
Lesotho	2003	4	0
Lesotho	2004	1	0
Lesotho	2006	5	1
Lesotho	2007	4	0
Lesotho	2008	5	1
Total		35	4

Scores and results list Lesotho's goal tally first, score column indicates score after each Seema goal.

List of international goals scored by Lehlohonolo Seema
No.	Date	Venue	Opponent	Score	Result	Competition	Ref.
1	2 August 1998	Setsoto Stadium, Maseru, Lesotho	Mauritius	1–1	1–1	2000 Africa Cup of Nations qualification	
2	14 January 2001	Barbourfields Stadium, Bulawayo, Zimbabwe	Zimbabwe	2–1	2–1	2002 Africa Cup of Nations qualification	
3	16 April 2006	Setsoto Stadium, Maseru, Lesotho	Swaziland	1–2	2–2	Friendly	
4	8 June 2008	Free State Stadium, Bloemfontein, South Africa	Ghana	2–3	2–3	2010 FIFA World Cup qualification	
