= Mandla Zwane =

South African soccer player

Personal information
- Full name: Mandla Cristopher Zwane
- Date of birth: 23 June 1973 (age 53)
- Place of birth: Tohoyandou, South Africa
- Height: 1.66 m (5 ft 5 in)
- Position: Forward

Youth career
- Orlando Pirates

Senior career*
Years	Team	Apps	(Gls)
1992–1994	Orlando Pirates		
1994–1995	FC Porto	0	(0)
1994–1995	→ F.C. Penafiel (loan)	8	(0)
1995–1996	Gil Vicente F.C.	5	(0)
1996–1997	Selangor FA		
1997–2001	Orlando Pirates		
2001–2005	Supersport United		
2006–2007	Black Leopards		
2007–2008	Mpumalanga Black Aces		

International career
2003	South Africa	1	(0)
- * Club domestic league appearances and goals

Mandla Zwane (born 23 June 1973) is a former South African football player that plays mostly as an attacking midfielder or supporting striker.

== Career ==
He played most of his career in Orlando Pirates having played also for FC Porto and Selangor of Malaysia.

Zwane signed for FC Porto in 1994, but never made a Portuguese Liga appearance for the club, instead going on loan to F.C. Penafiel.

== International career ==
He was capped once for South Africa.
