= Banks Setlhodi =

South African soccer player

Personal information
- Full name: Motsau Joseph Setlhodi
- Date of birth: 12 December 1947 (age 78)
- Place of birth: Randfontein, South Africa
- Position: Goalkeeper

Youth career
- 1964–1968: Randfontein Young Zebras
- 1969: Kaizer XI

Senior career*
Years	Team	Apps	(Gls)
1970–1985	Kaizer Chiefs	446	(23)

International career^{‡}
- SA Black XI
1973–1977	South Africa	2	(0)
- * Club domestic league appearances and goals as of 30 May 2012 ‡ National team caps and goals as of 30 May 2012

Motsau Joseph "Banks" Setlhodi (born 12 April 1947) in Randfontein, South Africa is a South African former soccer player who played in South Africa for Randfontein Young Zebras and Kaizer Chiefs.

== Early life ==
Setlhodi grew up in Madubaville, Randfontein. He attended Topia Lower Primary and later Wesele Higher Primary. He grew up playing soccer in the street until he was invited by his friend to play for Randfontein Young Zebras' 3rd Division side which he played for until he was promoted to the senior team. He joined Kaizer XI in 1969.

== Club career ==
He was one of the first Kaizer Chiefs recruits, he was recruited by Ewert Nene. He could play all positions on the field and he was a regular penalty taker. He was nicknamed "Banks" after 1966 World Cup winner and former Hellenic goalkeeper Gordon Banks, when he saved a fierce penalty kick from the British XI's Rod Marsh.

== International career ==
He represented South Africa in 1977 versus Rhodesia.
