= Carling Black Label Cup =

- Founded: 2011; 15 years ago
- Abolished: 2022; 4 years ago
- Region: South Africa
- Teams: 4 (from 2022)
- Last champions: Mamelodi Sundowns (1 title)
- Most championships: Orlando Pirates (6 titles)
- Broadcaster(s): SABC and Supersport
- Motto: Be the champion coach
- Website: www.carlingblacklabel.co.za
- 2022 Carling Black Label Cup

The Carling Black Label Cup was a one-day four-team football tournament in South Africa. Prior to 2022, the Carling Black Label Cup has been a one-day pre-season match between Soweto rivals, Orlando Pirates and Kaizer Chiefs. The teams to compete were voted in from the 16 Premiership teams.

Similar to the abolished annual Telkom Charity Cup, which had four entrants and the semi-final winners playing twice in one day, the Black Label Cup had four participating teams with the winners of the first matches playing twice while losers playing penalties for the 3rd and 4th place play-off. The teams and line-ups were chosen by Carling Black Label customers who submitted an eleven-digit code found on Carling products and had their vote registered. Customers also chose which substitutions to make in-game by voting via text message.

In June 2011, South African football magazine Kick-Off conducted an interview with Carling Black Label general manager Andrea Quaye. Quaye stated that the Black Label Cup had been in the planning stages in 2010, one year prior to the announcement of the cancellation of the Charity Cup. She also stated that the competition was established by Kaizer Chiefs, Orlando Pirates and Ogilvy & Mather.

The 2018 edition was cancelled due to the 2018 FIFA World Cup. The 2020 edition was also cancelled due to the COVID-19 pandemic.

The 2022 edition was revamped to include 2 other teams to join the traditional teams, Kaizer Chiefs and Orlando Pirates. After fans submitted their team choices, Pretoria-based club Mamelodi Sundowns and Durban club AmaZulu FC filled out the 3rd and 4th spots in the tournament.

After 2022, the tournament was discontinued and merged into the 2023 Carling Knockout Cup.

== Results ==
Season	Winner	Score	Runners–up	Venue
2011	Orlando Pirates	0-0; 4-3 pen.	Kaizer Chiefs	FNB Stadium
2012	Orlando Pirates	1-1; 5-4 pen.	Kaizer Chiefs	FNB Stadium
2013	Kaizer Chiefs	1-0	Orlando Pirates	FNB Stadium
2014	Orlando Pirates	0-0; 6-5 pen.	Kaizer Chiefs	FNB Stadium
2015	Orlando Pirates	1-1; 4-3 pen.	Kaizer Chiefs	FNB Stadium
2016	Kaizer Chiefs	2-0	Orlando Pirates	FNB Stadium
2017	Kaizer Chiefs	1-0	Orlando Pirates	FNB Stadium
2019	Orlando Pirates	2-0	Kaizer Chiefs	FNB Stadium
2021	Kaizer Chiefs	0-0; 4-3 pen.	Orlando Pirates	Orlando Stadium
2022	Mamelodi Sundowns	4-0	Orlando Pirates	FNB Stadium
