= Patrick Ntsoelengoe =

South African soccer player and manager

Ace Ntsoelengoe
Personal information
- Full name: Patrick Pule Zolile Ntsoelengoe
- Date of birth: 26 February 1952
- Place of birth: Randfontein, Transvaal, Union of South Africa
- Date of death: 8 May 2006 (aged 54)
- Place of death: Lenasia, Gauteng, South Africa
- Positions: Striker; midfielder

Youth career
- Powerlines
- 1968: Mohlakeng Home Stars
- 1969–1970: Kaizer XI

Senior career*
| Years | Team | Apps | (Gls) |
| 1971–1988 | Kaizer Chiefs | 542 | (250) |
| 1973 | Miami Toros | 9 | (3) |
| 1975 | Denver Dynamos | 21 | (10) |
| 1976–1981 | Minnesota Kicks | 155 | (50) |
| 1979–1980 | Minnesota Kicks (indoor) | 5 | (2) |
| 1982–1984 | Toronto Blizzard | 59 | (23) |
| 1986–1988 | Toronto Blizzard | | |
| Total | | 791 | (338) |

International career
| 1977 | South Africa | 1 | (0) |

Managerial career
- 1985: Ace's Mates
- 1997: South Africa U-23
- * Club domestic league appearances and goals

Patrick Pule "Ace" Ntsoelengoe OIS (26 February 1952 – 8 May 2006) was a South African soccer player who is widely considered as one of the greatest the country has ever produced.

== Early life ==
Ntsoelengoe was born to Daniel Ndimande and Margaret Ntsoelengoe. Ntsoelengoe did not grow up with his parents, as they were not yet married when he was born. The Ntsoelengoe surname comes from his grandmother, who raised him until his parents got married. His surname remained unchanged after this.

Ntsoelengoe was a close friend to Mbongeni Ngema. Before starting his soccer career, he played tennis and used to practice at a tennis court next to his home. He also played the organ and the guitar, earning the nickname "Quincy Jones". Ntsoelengoe grew up playing soccer with other boys in the street. He later joined an amateur coloured team, Powerlines and when he moved to Mohlakeng he joined Mohlakeng Home Stars and started to gain popularity. In 1969, when Kaizer XI played Randfontein XI he impressed Kaizer XI, Orlando Pirates and Moroka Swallows. He joined Kaizer XI at the age of 17. Ntsoelengoe's father, Daniel (born 1934), played semi-professional football with Randfontein Young Zebras. He inspired the affectionate nickname 'Ace'.

== Playing career ==
Ntsoelengoe spent almost his entire career with Kaizer Chiefs in his home country. During the local offseason he usually played in the United States and Canada.

In total he played 11 seasons in the North American Soccer League, beginning in 1973 with the Miami Toros. He is also a member of the National Soccer Hall of Fame.

He made his name, however, with the Minnesota Kicks and enhanced his reputation with Toronto Blizzard. A quiet man with incredible skills, it is quite remarkable that his soccer career was confined to South Africa and North America. He acquired his nickname from his father, Daniel, who was also one of South Africa's top players. While Ace spent his summers in Canada or in the United States, he returned home during the winter to play for the Kaizer Chiefs, a club with an enormous following in Johannesburg. Ace played there from the early 1970s to the mid-1980s. An idol in his own country, Ace spent only one season with Miami, missed the 1974 season but returned to the NASL in 1975 to play for the Denver Dynamos.

When that franchise moved to Minnesota in 1976, he moved along with them and thus began the first of six highly successful years with the Kicks. He was acquired by Toronto Blizzard in December 1981, when the Kicks were about to fold, and became a key figure in the Blizzard's rise to become one of the top NASL teams. He played for Minnesota in Soccer Bowl 76 and for Toronto in Soccer Bowl 83 and the Soccer Bowl Series of 1984. Nominally a midfielder, he constantly pushed forward into attacking positions and often scored more goals than strikers. In 1986, he returned to play with Toronto Blizzard in the National Soccer League.

Ntsoelengoe represented South Africa in 1977 versus Rhodesia.

== Managing career ==
In 1985, he tried to start up his own team like Kaizer Motaung had. He called it Ace's Mates. It only ran for one year.

In 1997, he was manager of the South Africa U23 team.

== Style of play ==
Former Argentinean manager Oscar Martinez remarked that the midfielder was "almost a perfect footballer. He can dribble, he can shoot, he can attack, and he can defend. He is good in the air, good on the ground and good everywhere you can think of." when the South African Invitational XI hammered an Argentina XI 5–1. Former South African national coach Clive Barker insisted the Chiefs legend was as gifted as Zinedine Zidane.

== Death ==
"Ace" died of a heart attack on 8 May 2006 in Lenasia, just south of Johannesburg. At the time of his death he was a youth coach at Kaizer Chiefs. In tributes he was hailed as one of the best players ever produced by South Africa. One of his former coaches at Chiefs, Eddie Lewis, is quoted as saying that if he had been born 20 years later, Ace would have enjoyed the same status as Ronaldinho. This is a view shared by former Bafana Bafana coach Clive Baker, "If Ace was here now, he'd be spoken of in the same breath as Fernando Torres, Cristiano Ronaldo and Lionel Messi."

In 2008, he was posthumously awarded the Order of Ikhamanga (Silver). In 2016, Mohlakeng Stadium was renamed the Ace Ntsoelengoe Stadium in his honor.

== North American Soccer League Statistics ==
| Year | Team | Games | Goals | Assists | Points |
|---|---|---|---|---|---|
| 1973 | Miami Toros | 9 | 3 | 2 | 8 |
| 1975 | Denver Dynamos | 21 | 10 | 5 | 25 |
| 1976 | Minnesota Kicks | 22 | 6 | 4 | 16 |
| 1977 | Minnesota Kicks | 21 | 3 | 5 | 11 |
| 1978 | Minnesota Kicks | 29 | 9 | 8 | 26 |
| 1979 | Minnesota Kicks | 29 | 8 | 11 | 27 |
| 1980 | Minnesota Kicks | 32 | 13 | 17 | 43 |
| 1981 | Minnesota Kicks | 22 | 12 | 7 | 31 |
| 1982 | Toronto Blizzard | 32 | 14 | 12 | 40 |
| 1983 | Toronto Blizzard | 6 | 1 | 3 | 5 |
| 1984 | Toronto Blizzard | 21 | 8 | 8 | 24 |
| 11-Year Totals | | 244 | 87 | 82 | 256 |
