= Siwelele F.C. =

Siwelele
- Full name: Siwelele Football Club
- Founded: 2025; 1 year ago, purchased Supersport United
- Ground: Dr. Petrus Molemela Stadium
- Capacity: 22,000
- Chairman: Calvin Le John
- League: South African Premiership
- 2025–26: 10th of 16
- Website: https://www.siwelele.com/
Home colours	Away colours

Siwelele FC is a South African professional soccer club. The team was formed following the purchase of SuperSport United for R50 million at the end of the 2024–25 Premiership season.

Siwelele is the nickname of Bloemfontein Celtic, and there has been speculation that the club would relocate to Bloemfontein and attempt to claim that club's name.

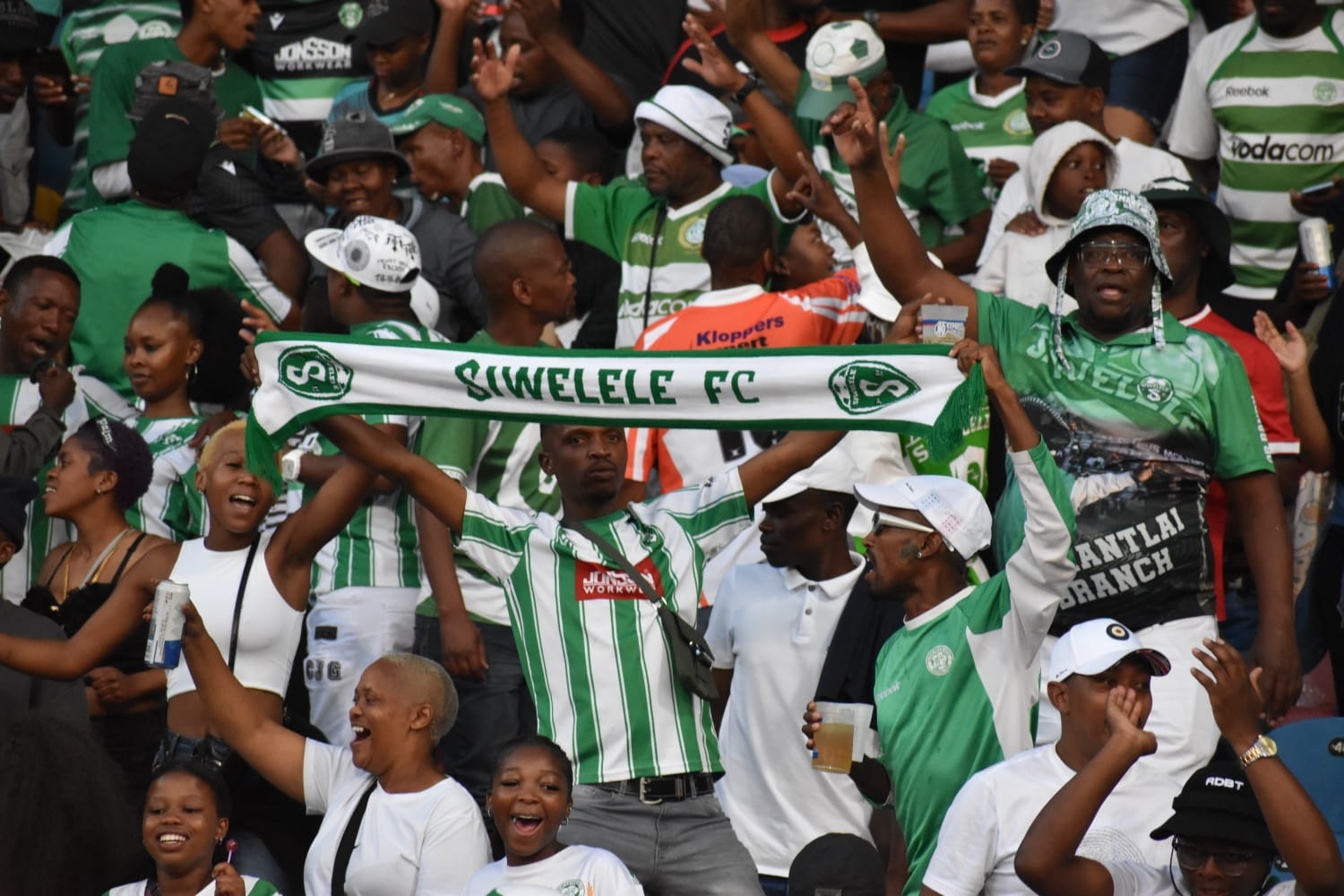
Siwelele Fans attenting a game in Bloemfontein 2025

Initially scheduled to play in Pretoria, the club started the season based in Bloemfontein

In September 2025, following a poor start to the season, chairperson Calvin Le John fired CEO Stan Matthews and assistant coach Andre Arendse, citing daily threats on their lives and their families lives.

Under Lehlohonolo Seema the club stabilised in its first season in the Premiership.

Seema was dismissed by Siwelele following a slow start to the 2026–27 season.

== League record ==
=== Premiership ===
- 2025–26 – 10th
