= Carling Knockout Cup =

South African football tournament

- Founded: 1982; 44 years ago
- Region: South Africa
- Teams: 16
- Current champions: Orlando Pirates (2nd title)
- Most championships: Kaizer Chiefs (13 titles)
- Broadcaster: •SuperSport •SABC Sport
- Motto: Once Always
- Website: carlingblacklabelcup.co.za
- 2026 Carling Knockout Cup

The Carling Knockout Cup is a South African professional soccer knockout competition which comprises the 16 teams in the South African Premiership. It is the third of the three main cups administered by the PSL along with the MTN 8 and the Nedbank Cup. The competition was first held in 1982 as the Datsun Challenge, and in 2023 under its current sponsored name.

== Format ==
The format used in this competition is the knockout stage phase. The competition will be played by 16 league teams in a single knockout match.

A winner is decided after full-time (90 minutes). If the two teams playing against each other are still tied after full-time, then the match will go through to extra time. If the score is still tied, then the match will go to penalties. The winner of the match must be decided on the match day.

After the conclusion of the competition, the winner will play against a best-XI voted by the fans. The All-stars team must consist of 6 players from the first tier league and 6 players from the second tier, and a coach voted on by the fans.

== Sponsorship ==
The competition was introduced in the 1982–83 season under the name Datsun Challenge. With the formation of the NSL in 1984, it was rebranded as the JPS Knockout Cup, a title it retained until 1992.

It then became the Coca‑Cola Cup, a title it held till 1996, after which it was replaced by the Rothmans Cup. In 2001, following new regulations restricting tobacco sponsorship in sport, the competition reverted to the Coca‑Cola Cup.

Telkom assumed sponsorship in 2006 and remained the title sponsor until 2020. The 2020–21 edition was cancelled after the withdrawal of the main sponsor, Telkom. In August 2021, the league confirmed that the tournament would be discontinued due to fixture congestion, and it did not take place during the 2021–22 and 2022–23 seasons. The competition was revived in the 2023–24 season under a new sponsorship agreement with Carling Black Label, adopting the name Carling Knockout Cup.

== Competition history ==
Year	Winner	Score	Runner-up
Datsun Challenge
1982	Arcadia Shepherds	1–1 (2–0)	Highlands Park
1983	Kaizer Chiefs	2–1	Wits University
John Player Special (JPS) Knockout Cup
1984	Kaizer Chiefs (2)		Durban Bush Bucks
1985	Wits University		Kaizer Chiefs
1986	Kaizer Chiefs (3)		Moroka Swallows
1987	Durban Bush Bucks		Orlando Pirates
1988	Kaizer Chiefs (4)		Jomo Cosmos
1989	Kaizer Chiefs (5)		Moroka Swallows
1990	Mamelodi Sundowns		Orlando Pirates
1991	Dynamos		Giant Blackpool
Coca-Cola Cup
1992	AmaZulu		Kaizer Chiefs
1993	Umtata Bucks		Santos
1994	Qwa Qwa Stars		Hellenic
1995	Wits University (2)		Orlando Pirates
1996	Umtata Bush Bucks (2)		Qwa Qwa Stars
Rothmans Cup
1997	Kaizer Chiefs (6)		Mamelodi Sundowns
1998	Kaizer Chiefs (7)		Mamelodi Sundowns
1999	Mamelodi Sundowns(2)	2–0	Free State Stars
2000	Ajax Cape Town	4–1	Orlando Pirates
Coca-Cola Cup
2001	Kaizer Chiefs (8)	5–0	Jomo Cosmos
2002	Jomo Cosmos	1–0	Kaizer Chiefs
2003	Kaizer Chiefs (9)	2-0	Silver Stars
2004	Kaizer Chiefs (10)	1–0	SuperSport United
2005	Jomo Cosmos (2)	1–1 (4–1 pen.)	SuperSport United
Telkom Knockout Cup
2006	Silver Stars	3–1	Ajax Cape Town
2007	Kaizer Chiefs (11)	0(3)–(2)0	Mamelodi Sundowns
2008	Ajax Cape Town (2)	2–1	Orlando Pirates
2009	Kaizer Chiefs (12)	2–1	Ajax Cape Town
2010	Kaizer Chiefs (13)	3–0	Orlando Pirates
2011	Orlando Pirates	3–1	Bidvest Wits
2012	Bloemfontein Celtic	1–0	Mamelodi Sundowns
2013	Platinum Stars (2)	2–1	Orlando Pirates
2014	SuperSport United	3–2	Platinum Stars
2015	Mamelodi Sundowns (3)	3–1	Kaizer Chiefs
2016	Cape Town City	2–1	SuperSport United F.C.
2017	Bidvest Wits (3)	1–0	Bloemfontein Celtic
2018	Baroka	2(3)–(2)2	Orlando Pirates
2019	Mamelodi Sundowns (4)	2–1	Maritzburg United
Carling Knockout Cup
2023	Stellenbosch (1)	1–1 (5–4)	TS Galaxy
2024	Magesi (1)	2–1	Mamelodi Sundowns
2025	Orlando Pirates (2)	1–0	Marumo Gallants

== Results by team ==
Results by team
Club	Wins	First final won	Most recent final won	Runners-up	Most recent final lost	Total final appearances
Kaizer Chiefs	13	1983	2010	4	2015	17
Mamelodi Sundowns	4	1990	2019	5	2024	9¹
Bidvest Wits/Wits University	3	1985	2017	2	2011	5
Orlando Pirates	2	2011	2025	8	2018	10
Ajax Cape Town	2	2000	2008	2	2009	4
Jomo Cosmos	2	2002	2005	2	2001	4
Platinum Stars/ Silver Stars	2	2006	2013	2	2014	4
Umtata Bush Bucks	2	1993	1996	0	–	2
Supersport United	1	2014	2014	3	2016	4
Bloemfontein Celtic	1	2012	2012	1	2017	2
Arcadia Shepherds	1	1982	1982	0	–	1
Durban Bush Bucks	1	1987	1987	1	–	2
AmaZulu	1	1992	1992	0	–	1
Dynamos	1	1991	1991	0	–	1
Cape Town City	1	2016	2016	0	–	1
Baroka	1	2018	2018	0	–	1
Stellenbosch	1	2023	2023	0	–	1
Magesi	1	2024	2024	0	–	1
Moroka Swallows	0	–	–	2	1989	2
Highlands Park	0	–	–	1	1982	1
Maritzburg United	0	-	-	1	2019	1
TS Galaxy	0	-	-	1	2023	1
Marumo Gallants	0	-	-	1	2025	1
