= Kaizer Chiefs F.C. =

South African football club

Kaizer Chiefs
- Full name: Kaizer Chiefs Football Club
- Nicknames: AmaKhosi (Kings); The Phefeni Boys; Abafana bokuthula noxolo (The Boys of Love & Peace); The Glamour Boys
- Short name: Chiefs
- Founded: 7 January 1970; 56 years ago
- Stadium: FNB Stadium
- Capacity: 94,797
- Owner: Kaizer Motaung
- Chairman: Kaizer Motaung
- Head Coach: Fernando Da Cruz
- League: South African Premiership
- 2025–26: 3rd of 16
- Website: www.kaizerchiefs.com

Kaizer Chiefs Football Club (often known as Chiefs) is a South African professional football club based in Naturena, Johannesburg South, that plays in the Premiership. The team is nicknamed AmaKhosi, which means 'Kings' or 'Chiefs' in Zulu, and the Phefeni Glamour Boys. They hold the most trophies amongst all clubs in South Africa and are the most successful team in South African football history since the start of the top flight in 1970.

The team has a strong local rivalry, the Soweto derby, with Orlando Pirates, a fellow Soweto team that Chiefs founder Kaizer Motaung played for in his early playing career. Famous players who donned the black-and-gold jersey in the past include former national team captains Neil Tovey and Lucas Radebe as well as Patrick Ntsoelengoe, Gary Bailey, John "Shoes" Moshoeu, Shaun Bartlett, Steve Komphela, Siyabonga Nomvete, Doctor Khumalo, Brian Baloyi, Itumeleng Khune and Siphiwe Tshabalala.

It is the most supported team in South Africa. Kaizer Chiefs had a support base of over 16 million at the turn of the century. They drew an average home attendance of 16,144 in the 2019–20 season, the highest in the league. The team plays many of its home matches at the 94,797-capacity FNB Stadium. In January 2026, Kaizer Chiefs celebrated their 56th anniversary.

== History ==
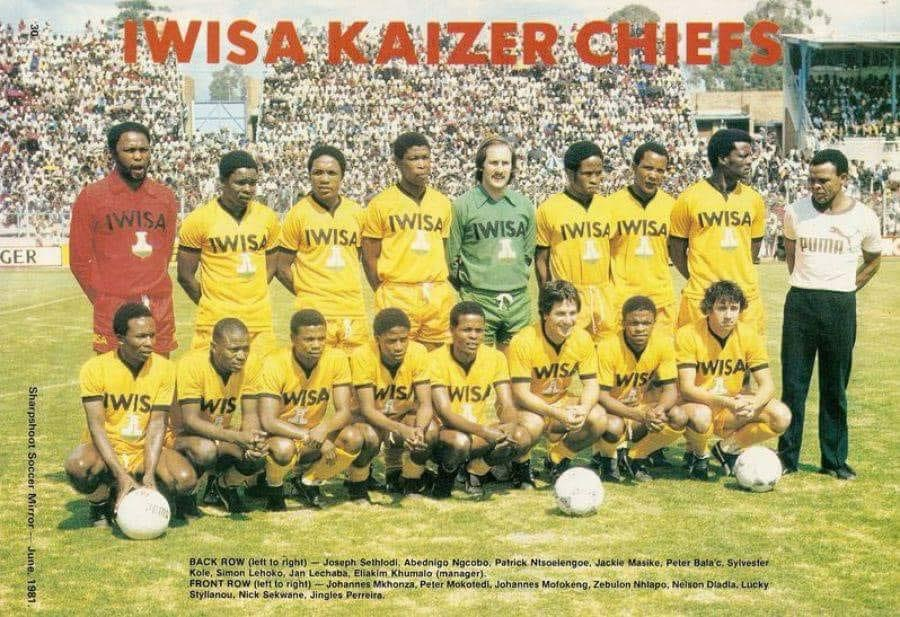
The Kaizer Chiefs in 1981

Kaizer Chiefs FC was founded in January 1970 shortly after the return of Kaizer "Chincha Guluva" Motaung from the United States where he played as a striker for the Atlanta Chiefs of the North American Soccer League (NASL). He combined his own first name with the Atlanta Chiefs to create the name of Kaizer Chiefs. Several other people have played key roles in the formation and growth of Kaizer Chiefs, including the late Gilbert Sekgabi, Clarence Mlokoti, China Ngema, Ewert "The Lip" Nene, and Rabelani Jan Mofokeng, he trailed and quit because of work. Club manager Bobby Motaung, son of Kaizer Chiefs founder Kaizer Motaung, has been a key figure in the administration, recruitment and strategic direction of the club since the 1990s.

Kaizer Chiefs are known as "Amakhosi" by its fans, a Zulu word meaning "kings" or "chiefs". Their headquarters is Kaizer Chiefs Village six kilometres south of Johannesburg.

The 2001–02 season was one of the Club's most successful in their history as well as their most tragic. They won four major trophies in four months; the Vodacom Challenge, the BP Top Eight, the Coca-Cola Cup, and the African Cup Winners' Cup. At the time the team was said to have been a team that was on "Operation vat alles" by its then public relations officer Putco Mafani, "vat alles" being an Afrikaans statement meaning "take everything" in English. However, the highs of cup wins was contrasted by the lows of the Ellis Park Stadium disaster on 11 April 2001, in which 43 fans were crushed to death during the Soweto Derby between Chiefs and their arch-rivals Orlando Pirates.

By winning the African Cup Winners' Cup, Chiefs played the 2001 CAF Champions League winners Al Ahly of Egypt in the 2002 CAF Super Cup. In April 2002, Kaizer Chiefs' achievements during 2001 were recognized as they were chosen as the "CAF Club of the Year" by the Confederation of African Football.

In the 2003–04 season Chiefs were given the Fair Play Award at the Peace Cup in South Korea. Chiefs ended the season as league champions, winning the Premiership for the first time in their history.

During the championship race of the 2004–05 soccer season, Chiefs overtook the season-long leaders (Orlando Pirates) in the last game of the season to defend its PSL championship. Under the leadership of Romanian coach Ted Dumitru, Zambian striker Collins Mbesuma had a record-breaking season scoring 39 goals in all competitions.

Kaizer Chiefs' forays into Africa were temporarily scuttled by a Confederation of African Football (CAF) ban. However, it still made its presence felt through the annual Vodacom Challenge that pit Kaizer Chiefs and Orlando Pirates with an invited European club. Chiefs have won the Vodacom Challenge Cup 5 times since its inception. They beat a young Manchester United side 4–3 on penalties in the 2006 Challenge to win the trophy.

In March 2007, coach Ernst Middendorp and the club parted company. The club instantly appointed their rival Orlando Pirates' former coach Kosta Papić for the remainder of the 2006–07 season.

Muhsin Ertuğral returned for the 2007–08 season to begin his second stint with Chiefs, having already coached The Glamour Boys from 1999 until 2003.

Under coach Ernst Middendorp in the 2019/20 season, Kaizer Chiefs topped the table from the seventh matchday of the season until losing the title on the final day, which saw the club finishing two points behind winners Mamelodi Sundowns.

On 26 June 2021, the team secured their first CAF Champions League final appearance after defeating Wydad AC by a 1–0 aggregate.

On 9 July 2021, Kaizer Chiefs confirmed through Twitter that they signed six players for next season after their transfer ban ended. On 17 July 2021, they lost 3–0 against Al Ahly in the Champions League Final.

In the 2023/24 season, Kaizer chiefs finished in 10th position under the interim coach Cavin Johnson, making this their lowest finish in the PSL era.

== Stadium ==
=== Amakhosi Stadium ===
The Amakhosi have used no less than nine stadiums in Johannesburg as their home ground, and often rotated between several stadiums during the season. In August 2006, the club decided to develop their own stadium, the Amakhosi Stadium. However, this project has stalled.

=== FNB Stadium/Soccer City ===
The completed Soccer City in 2014

FNB Stadium is a stadium located in Johannesburg, with a capacity of 94,736 seats. It is located next to the South African Football Association headquarters (SAFA House), where both the FIFA offices and the Local Organising Committee for the 2010 FIFA World Cup is housed.

== The Soweto Derby ==
The Soweto Derby between Kaizer Chiefs and Orlando Pirates is a rivalry dating back to 1970, and in contrast to most other games in the South African Premiership, always attracts a large fanbase.

== Honours ==
Kaizer Chiefs' honours
Type	Competition	Titles	Seasons
Domestic	League/Premiership	12	1974, 1977, 1979, 1981, 1984, 1989, 1991, 1992, 2003–04, 2004–05, 2012–13, 2014–15
Domestic	Nedbank Cup	14	1971, 1972, 1976, 1977, 1979, 1981, 1982, 1984, 1987, 1992, 2000, 2006, 2013, 2025
Domestic	Carling Knockout Cup	13	1983, 1984, 1986, 1988, 1989, 1997, 1998, 2001, 2003, 2004, 2007, 2009, 2010
Domestic	MTN 8	15	1974, 1976, 1977, 1981, 1982, 1985, 1987, 1989, 1991, 1992, 1994, 2001, 2006, 2008, 2014
Continental	CAF Champions League	Runners-up	2021
Continental	CAF Super Cup	Runners-up	2002
Continental	African Cup Winners' Cup	1	2001

- Record

Kaizer Chiefs' unofficial honours
Type	Competition	Titles	Seasons
Unofficial domestic	Castle Challenge Cup	2	1990, 1991
Unofficial domestic	Carling Black Label Cup	4	2013, 2016, 2017, 2021
Unofficial domestic	CUFA Cup	1	2024
Unofficial domestic	Home of Legends Cup	1	2024
Unofficial domestic	Ohlsson's Challenge Cup	2	1987, 1989
Unofficial domestic	Panasonic Cup	1	1986
Unofficial domestic	Sales House Champ of Champs	7	1974, 1976, 1977, 1980, 1981, 1982, 1984
Unofficial domestic	Shell Helix Ultra Cup	1	2019
Unofficial domestic	Stylo Cup	1	1970
Unofficial domestic	Telkom Charity Cup	11	1986, 1987, 1988, 1989, 1990, 1994, 1996, 1998, 2002, 2003, 2010
Unofficial domestic	UCT Super Team Competition	1	1972
Unofficial domestic	Vodacom Challenge	5	2000, 2001, 2003, 2006, 2009

PSL Reserve League

- Champions (1): 2025

=== Awards ===
CAF Awards

- African Club of the Year 2001

== Performance in CAF Competitions ==
Kaizer Chiefs qualified to play for the 1997 CAF Champions League but withdrew from the competition. The team made their first CAF Cup appearance in the year 2000 and only made it to the round of 16. They had the same result in the 2005 CAF Champions League and 2014 CAF Champions League. In the 2018 edition of the CAF Confederations Cup, Kaizer Chiefs reached the playoff round of 30 in which they were eliminated. Kaizer Chiefs are the runner-ups of the 2020-21 CAF Champions League and the 2002 CAF Super Cup after being crowned the Champions of the 2001 African Cup Winners' Cup.

Chiefs were banned by the African Football (CAF) from competing in African club competitions until 2009 after their abrupt withdrawal from the 2005 CAF Confederation Cup. This was the second time in four years that Chiefs had been penalized by CAF for refusal to participate in a competition.

Competition	Result	Year
CAF champions League	Round of 16	1993
CAF champions League	Round of 16	2005
CAF champions League	Round of 16	2014
CAF champions League	Round of 32	2016
CAF champions League	Runner-up	2020-21
CAF Super Cup	Runner-up	2002
African Cup Winners' Cup	Withdrew	1997
African Cup Winners' Cup	Champions	2001
African Cup Winners' Cup	Disqualified	2002
CAF Cup	Round of 16	2000
CAF Confederation Cup	Play-off Round	2014
CAF Confederation Cup	Play-off Round	2018
CAF Confederation Cup	Group stage	2025–26

Kaizer Chiefs' appearances in African competitions

- CAF Champions league = 5 appearance(s)
- CAF Confederations Cup = 3 appearance(s)
- CAF Super Cup = 1appearance(s)
- African Cup Winners' Cup = 3 appearance(s)
- CAF Cup = 1 appearance(s)

== Club Ranking ==
Kaizer Chiefs are ranked 30th on the CAF 5-year ranking for the 2024-25 CAF club Season.

Rank	Club	2019–20 (× 1)	2020–21 (× 2)	2021–22 (× 3)	2022–23 (× 4)	2023–24 (× 5)	Total
28	(Libya) Abu Salim	0	0	0	0	2	10
28	(Mali) Stade Malien	0	0	0	0	2	10
30	(South Africa) Kaizer Chiefs	0	5	0	0	0	10

== Crest and colours ==
=== Kit manufacturers and shirt sponsors ===
Period	Kit manufacturer	Shirt sponsor	Ref
1990-93	Kappa	IWISA	
1993-94	Kappa	United Bank	
1994-96	Kappa	IWISA	
1996-97	Reebok	IWISA	
1997-99	Reebok	TOTAL	
1999-01	Reebok	Vodacom	
2001-23	Nike	Vodacom	
2023–present	Kappa	Vodacom	

== Club records ==
- Most appearances – (South Africa) Doctor Khumalo 497
- Most appearances in a season – (South Africa) Neil Tovey 52 (1992)
- Most goals in a season (all competitions) – (Zambia) Collins Mbesuma – 35 2004/05
- Record win – 9-1 vs Manning Rangers (Coca-Cola Challenge – 23 March 1996)
- Record loss – 1-5 vs AmaZulu (League – 08/06/86), Orlando Pirates (League – 03/11/90), Mamelodi Sundowns (League – 02/05/2024)

=== PSL-era ===
season	pos	Record								
season	pos	P	W	D	L	GF	GA	GD	PTS	win%
1996–97	2nd	34	18	12	4	56	23	33	66	52.9 %
1997–98	2nd	34	17	12	5	52	35	17	63	50 %
1998–99	2nd	34	23	6	5	73	34	39	75	67.6 %
1999–2000	3rd	34	16	12	6	40	22	18	60	47 %
2000–01	2nd	34	16	12	6	41	25	16	60	47 %
2001–02	9th	34	12	13	9	38	33	5	49	35.29 %
2002–03	6th	30	14	8	8	42	26	16	50	46.7 %
2003–04	Winners¹	30	18	9	3	39	11	28	63	60 %
2004–05	Winners²	30	17	11	2	55	26	29	62	56.6 %
2005–06	3rd	30	12	14	4	39	26	13	50	40 %
2006–07	9th	30	11	9	10	42	32	10	42	36.7 %
2007–08	6th	30	10	13	7	32	20	12	43	33.3 %
2008–09	3rd	30	15	5	10	37	32	5	50	50 %
2009–10	3rd	30	14	9	7	39	25	14	51	46.7 %
2010–11	3rd	30	17	8	5	45	23	22	59	56.7 %
2011–12	5th	30	14	8	8	35	23	12	50	46.7 %
2012–13	Winners³	30	15	12	3	48	21	27	57	50 %
2013–14	2nd	30	19	6	5	43	17	26	63	63.3 %
2014–15	Winners⁴	30	21	6	3	41	14	27	69	70 %
2015–16	5th	30	11	13	6	39	28	11	50	36.6 %
2016–17	4th	30	13	11	6	39	28	11	50	43.3 %
2017–18	3rd	30	12	12	6	27	22	5	48	40 %
2018–19	9th	30	9	12	9	33	29	4	39	30 %
2019–20	2nd	30	17	6	7	48	27	21	57	56.6 %
2020-21	8th	30	8	12	10	34	37	-3	36	26.6 %
2021-22	5th	30	13	8	9	34	26	8	47	43.3 %
2022-23	5th	30	13	5	12	32	33	-1	44	43.3 %
2023-24	10th	30	9	9	12	25	30	-5	36	30%
2024-25	9th	28	8	8	12	27	32	-5	32	29%
2025-26	3rd	30	15	9	6	33	19	14	54	50%

== Personnel ==
=== Club officials ===
Position	Staff
Executive Chairman	(South Africa) Kaizer Motaung
Marketing and Commercial Director	(South Africa) Jessica Motaung
Football Manager	(South Africa) Bobby Motaung
Sporting Director	(South Africa) Kaizer Motaung Jr.

== Players ==
As of 21 August 2026

Note: Flags indicate national team as defined under FIFA eligibility rules; some limited exceptions apply. Players may hold more than one non-FIFA nationality.

No.	Pos.	Nation	Player
1	GK	RSA	Brandon Peterson (captain)
2	DF	RSA	Thabiso Monyane
3	FW	RSA	Khanyisa Mayo
4	DF	RSA	Zitha Kwinika
5	MF	RSA	Sibongiseni Mthethwa
6	MF	RSA	Lebohang Maboe
7	FW	RSA	Mduduzi Shabalala
8	MF	RSA	Siphesihle Ndlovu
11	FW	RSA	Luke Baartman
12	MF	RSA	Nkosingiphile Ngcobo
13	FW	RSA	Pule Mmodi
14	DF	RSA	Rushwin Dortley
16	GK	RSA	Renaldo Leaner
17	MF	RSA	Asanele Velebayi
18	DF	RSA	Dillan Solomons
21	MF	RSA	Thabo Cele
22	MF	TAN	Adolf Bitegeko

No.	Pos.	Nation	Player
23	MF	RSA	Ethan Chislett
28	MF	RSA	Mfundo Vilakazi
29	DF	RSA	Paseka Mako
31	FW	RSA	Naledi Hlongwane
34	MF	RSA	Thulani Mabaso
39	DF	RSA	Reeve Frosler
42	DF	RSA	Thabo Moloisane
44	GK	RSA	Bruce Bvuma
47	FW	RSA	Wandile Duba
48	DF	RSA	Bradley Cross
50	FW	NGR	Etiosa Ighodaro
70	FW	RSA	Langelihle Phili
74	DF	RSA	Nkanyiso Shinga
77	FW	GBS	Flávio Silva
84	DF	ANG	Inácio Miguel
—	MF	RSA	Faiz Abrahams
—	FW	RSA	Elias Mokwana

== Notable former players ==
For all Kaizer Chiefs players with a Wikipedia article see Category:Kaizer Chiefs F.C. players

== Coaches ==
- (South Africa) Thomas Johnson (1971)
- (South Africa) Thomas Johnson and (South Africa) Kaizer Motaung (1972)
- (South Africa) Kaizer Motaung (1973–74)
- (South Africa) Eliakim Khumalo (1974)
- (England) Eddie Lewis (1974–76)
- (South Africa) Eliakim Khumalo (1976)
- (South Africa) Thomas Johnson (1976)
- (South Africa) Eliakim Khumalo (1976)
- (England) Eddie Lewis (1976)
- (South Africa) Kaizer Motaung (1977–78)
- (Chile) Mario Tuani (1979–80)
- (England) Eddie Lewis (1980)
- (South Africa) Chris Ngcobo (1981)
- (South Africa) Eliakim Khumalo (1981)
- (South Africa) Joseph Setlhodi (1982)
- (England) Eddie Lewis (1983)
- (South Africa) Eliakim Khumalo and (South Africa) Jackie Masike (1983)
- (Argentina) Orlando Casares (1983)
- (Scotland) Joe Frickleton (1984–85)
- (South Africa) Shaka Ngcobo (1985)
- (England) Eddie Lewis (1985)
- (Romania) Ted Dumitru (1985–88)
- (Malawi) Jack Chamangwana (1988)
- (England) Jeff Butler (1988–89)
- (Malawi) Jack Chamangwana (1989)
- (Peru) Augusto Palacios (1990)
- (England) Jeff Butler (1991)
- (South Africa) Nelson "Teenage" Dladla (1991)
- (Zambia) Wiseman Mbale (1992)
- (England) Jeff Butler (1992)
- (Portugal) Sergio dos Santos (1993)
- (South Africa) N. "Teenage" Dladla and (South Africa) Ryder Mofokeng (1993)
- (England) Geoff Hudson (1993)
- (France) Philippe Troussier (1994)
- (South Africa) Trott Moloto (1994)
- (Peru) Augusto Palacios (1995)
- (England) Jeff Butler (1995–96)
- (Brazil) Walter da Silva (1996)
- (South Africa) Wellington Manyathi (1997)
- (France) Paul Dolezar (1 July 1997 – 30 June 1999)
- (South Africa) Jacob Sephoa (1999)
- (Turkey) Muhsin Ertugral (14 July 1999–02)
- (South Africa) Doctor "16V" Khumalo and (South Africa) Ace Khuse (2002–03)
- (Romania) Ted Dumitru (12 June 2003 – 30 June 2005)
- (Germany) Ernst Middendorp (1 July 2005 – 5 March 2007)
- (Serbia) Kosta Papić (7 March 2007 – 4 June 2007)
- (Turkey) Muhsin Ertugral (1 July 2007 – 8 May 2009)
- (Serbia) Vladimir Vermezović (18 May 2009 – 12 April 2012)
- (South Africa) Ace Khuse (interim) (12 April 2012 – 30 June 2012)
- (Scotland) Stuart Baxter (1 July 2012 – June 2015)
- (South Africa) Steve Komphela (17 June 2015 – 21 April 2018)
- (Italy) Giovanni Solinas (12 July 2018 -7 December 2018)
- (Germany) Ernst Middendorp (7 December 2018 – 9 September 2020)
- (South Africa) Gavin Hunt (17 September 2020 – 28 May 2021)
- (Scotland) Stuart Baxter (7 June 2021 – 21 April 2022)
- (South Africa) Arthur Zwane (26 May 2022 – 28 June 2023)
- (South Africa) Molefi Ntseki (28 June 2023 – October 2023)
- (South Africa) Cavin Johnson (October 2023 – June 2024)
- (Tunisia) Nasreddine Nabi (7 July 2024– 10 October 2025)

== Kaiser Chiefs ==
British indie-rock band Kaiser Chiefs named themselves after the club. The band, from Leeds, reportedly chose the name—slightly altering the spelling—as a nod to South African centre-back Lucas Radebe, a beloved captain at Leeds United who played for the club for 11 years.

== Rugby ==
In 2012, Kaizer Chiefs registered a rugby sevens team to participate in the inaugural 7s Premier League.
