= 2010–11 Sunderland A.F.C. season =

English football club season

Sunderland A.F.C.
2010–11 season
- Chairman: Niall Quinn
- Manager: Steve Bruce
- Stadium: Stadium of Light
- Premier League: 10th
- League Cup: Third round
- FA Cup: Third round
- Top goalscorer: League: Asamoah Gyan (10); All: Asamoah Gyan; Darren Bent (11 each)
- Highest home attendance: 47,864 (vs. Newcastle United)
- Lowest home attendance: 13,532 (vs. Colchester United)
- Average home league attendance: 40,011
Home colours	Away colours

During the 2010–11 season, Sunderland A.F.C. (the professional association football club representing the aforementioned city) competed in the Premier League.

== Results ==
=== Pre-season ===
Date	Opponents	H/A	Result F-A	Scorers
17 July 2010	Darlington	A	0–1	Zenden
21 July 2010	Brighton & Hove Albion	A	1–1	Campbell
24 July 2010	Hull City	A	2–4	Campbell (4)
27 July 2010	Benfica	A	2–0	
31 July 2010	Leicester City	A	1–2	Campbell, Henderson
8 August 2010	1899 Hoffenheim	A	3–1	Henderson

=== Premier League ===
Date	Opponents	H/A	Result F–A	Scorers	Attendance	League position
14 August 2010	Birmingham City	H	2–2	Darren Bent 24' pen., Stephen Carr 56' o.g.	38,390	8th
21 August 2010	West Bromwich Albion	A	1–0		23,624	15th
29 August 2010	Manchester City	H	1–0	Darren Bent 90' pen.	38,610	10th
11 September 2010	Wigan Athletic	A	1–1	Asamoah Gyan 66'	15,844	10th
18 September 2010	Arsenal	H	1–1	Darren Bent 90'	38,950	10th
25 September 2010	Liverpool	A	2–2	Darren Bent 25' pen., 48'	43,626	11th
2 October 2010	Manchester United	H	0–0		41,709	11th
18 October 2010	Blackburn Rovers	A	0–0		21,894	13th
23 October 2010	Aston Villa	H	1–0	Richard Dunne 25' o.g.	41,506	7th
31 October 2010	Newcastle United	A	5–1	Darren Bent 90'	51,988	12th
6 November 2010	Stoke City	H	2–0	Asamoah Gyan 9', 86'	36,541	8th
9 November 2010	Tottenham Hotspur	A	1–1	Asamoah Gyan 67'	35,843	8th
14 November 2010	Chelsea	A	0–3	Nedum Onuoha 45', Asamoah Gyan 52', Danny Welbeck 86'	41,072	6th
22 November 2010	Everton	H	2–2	Danny Welbeck 23', 70'	37,331	7th
27 November 2010	Wolverhampton Wanderers	A	3–2	Darren Bent 67', Danny Welbeck 77'	25,112	8th
5 December 2010	West Ham United	H	1–0	Jordan Henderson 34'	36,940	7th
11 December 2010	Fulham	A	0–0		24,462	7th
18 December 2010	Bolton Wanderers	H	1–0	Danny Welbeck 32'	35,101	6th
26 December 2010	Manchester United	A	2–0		75,269	7th
28 December 2010	Blackpool	H	0–2		42,892	7th
1 January 2011	Blackburn Rovers	H	3–0	Danny Welbeck 11', Darren Bent 19', Asamoah Gyan 89'	36,242	6th
5 January 2011	Aston Villa	A	0–1	Phil Bardsley 80'	32,627	6th
16 January 2011	Newcastle United	H	1–1	Asamoah Gyan 90'	47,864	6th
22 January 2011	Blackpool	A	1–2	Kieran Richardson 15', 36'	16,037	6th
1 February 2011	Chelsea	H	2–4	Phil Bardsley 4', Kieran Richardson 26'	37,855	6th
5 February 2011	Stoke City	A	2–3	Kieran Richardson 2', Asamoah Gyan 48'	26,008	7th
12 February 2011	Tottenham Hotspur	H	1–2	Asamoah Gyan 11'	40,986	7th
26 February 2011	Everton	A	2–0		37,776	8th
5 March 2011	Arsenal	A	0–0		60,081	8th
20 March 2011	Liverpool	H	0–2		47,207	9th
3 April 2011	Manchester City	A	5–0		44,197	12th
9 April 2011	West Bromwich Albion	H	2–3	Nicky Shorey 11' o.g., Phil Bardsley 31'	41,586	13th
16 April 2011	Birmingham City	A	2–0		28,108	14th
23 April 2011	Wigan Athletic	H	4–2	Asamoah Gyan 55', Jordan Henderson 67', Stéphane Sessègnon 73' pen., Jordan Henderson 77'	39,650	10th
30 April 2011	Fulham	H	0–3		39,576	14th
7 May 2011	Bolton Wanderers	A	1–2	Boudewijn Zenden 45', Zat Knight 90' o.g.	22,597	11th
14 May 2011	Wolverhampton Wanderers	H	1–3	Stéphane Sessègnon 33'	41,273	13th
22 May 2011	West Ham United	A	0–3	Boudewijn Zenden 17', Stéphane Sessègnon 51', Christian Riveros 90'	32,792	10th

==== League table ====
Pos	Team	Pld	W	D	L	GF	GA	GD	Pts	Qualification or relegation
8	Fulham	38	11	16	11	49	43	+6	49	Qualification for the Europa League first qualifying round (Note: Fulham, as the highest-ranked team from the Fair Play table not yet qualified for any European competition, entered the first qualifying round of the Europa League.)
9	Aston Villa	38	12	12	14	48	59	−11	48	
10	Sunderland	38	12	11	15	45	56	−11	47	
11	West Bromwich Albion	38	12	11	15	56	71	−15	47	
12	Newcastle United	38	11	13	14	56	57	−1	46	

Source: Barclays Premier League
Rules for classification: 1) points; 2) goal difference; 3) number of goals scored.

=== League Cup ===
Date	Round	Opponents	H/A	Result F–A	Scorers	Attendance
24 August 2010	2nd	Colchester United	H	2–0	Darren Bent 17', 39'	13,532
21 September 2010	3rd	West Ham United	H	1–2	Asamoah Gyan 41'	21,907

=== FA Cup ===
Date	Round	Opponents	H/A	Result F–A	Scorers	Attendance
8 January 2011	3rd	Notts County	H	1–2	Darren Bent 81' pen.	17,582

== Statistics ==
=== Discipline ===
Position	Nation	Number	Name	Premier League		League Cup		FA Cup		Total	
Position	Nation	Number	Name	Yellow card	Red card	Yellow card	Red card	Yellow card	Red card	Yellow card	Red card
MC/MCD	(England)	6	Lee Cattermole	5	2	0	0	0	0	5	2
DFC/LD/LI	(England)	19	Titus Bramble	4	1	0	0	0	0	4	1
MC/MI/PM	(Netherlands)	7	Boudewijn Zenden	0	1	0	0	0	0	0	1
CM/LM/LB	(England)	3	Kieran Richardson	8	0	0	0	0	0	8	0
CB	(England)	4	Michael Turner	3	0	0	0	0	0	3	0
RB/LB	(England)	2	Phil Bardsley	3	0	0	0	0	0	3	0
CM	(Ghana)	11	Sulley Muntari	2	0	0	0	0	0	2	0
CM/LM/RM	(France)	8	Steed Malbranque	2	0	0	0	0	0	2	0
CB	(Ghana)	5	John Mensah	2	0	0	0	0	0	2	0
CM	(Republic of Ireland)	18	David Meyler	2	0	0	0	0	0	2	0
CM/RM	(England)	10	Jordan Henderson	2	0	0	0	0	0	2	0
CF/LM	(England)	17	Danny Welbeck	2	0	0	0	0	0	2	0
GK	(Belgium)	22	Simon Mignolet	1	0	0	0	0	0	1	0
CB/RB	(Paraguay)	14	Paulo da Silva	1	0	0	0	0	0	1	0
CB/RB	(England)	15	Nedum Onuoha	1	0	0	0	0	0	1	0
CF	(England)	11	Darren Bent	1	0	0	0	0	0	1	0
CM	(Paraguay)	16	Cristian Riveros	1	0	0	0	0	0	1	0
RM/RB	(Egypt)	27	Ahmed Elmohamady	1	0	0	0	0	0	1	0
CB/LB	(England)	29	Anton Ferdinand	1	0	0	0	0	0	1	0
CM/RM	(Benin)	28	Stéphane Sessègnon	1	0	0	0	0	0	1	0
CM	(England)	26	Jack Colback	1	0	0	0	0	0	1	0

=== Overall ===
Games played	32 (29 Premier League, 2 Football League Cup, 1 F.A Cup)
Games won	10 (9 Premier League, 1 Football League Cup)
Games drawn	11 (11 Premier League)
Games lost	11 (9 Premier League, 1 Football League Cup, 1 F.A Cup)
Goals scored	37
Goals conceded	39
Goal difference	-2
Clean sheets	13
Yellow cards	44
Red cards	4
Worst discipline	(England) Lee Cattermole 5 (yellow card) 2 (red card)
Best result (s)	W 3–0 (A) v Chelsea – Premier League – 14 November 2010; W 3–0 (H) v Blackburn Rovers – Premier League – 1 January 2011; W 3–0 (A) v West Ham – Premier League – 22 May 2011
Worst result(s)	L 5–0 (A) v Manchester City – Premier League – 3 April 2011
Most appearances	Jordan Henderson (31)
Top scorer	(Ghana) Asamoah Gyan (11)
Points	Overall: 41/94 (44%)

=== Goal scorers ===
Position	Nation	Number	Name	Premier League	League Cup	FA Cup	Total
1	(Ghana)	33	Asamoah Gyan	10	1	0	11
1	(England)	11	Darren Bent	8	2	1	11
2	(England)	17	Danny Welbeck	6	0	0	6
3	(England)	10	Kieran Richardson	4	0	0	4
4	(England)	10	Jordan Henderson	3	0	0	3
4	(Scotland)	2	Phil Bardsley	3	0	0	3
4	(Benin)	28	Stéphane Sessègnon	3	0	0	3
5	(Netherlands)	7	Boudewijn Zenden	2	0	0	2
6	(England)	15	Nedum Onuoha	1	0	0	1
6	(Paraguay)	16	Christian Riveros	1	0	0	1
/	/	/	Own goals	4	0	0	4
			TOTALS	45	3	1	49

=== Appearances and goals ===
Last updated on 22 May 2011.

No.	Pos	Nat	Player	Total		Premier League		FA Cup		League Cup	
No.	Pos	Nat	Player	Apps	Goals	Apps	Goals	Apps	Goals	Apps	Goals
1	GK	(Scotland) SCO	Craig Gordon	15	0	15	0	0	0	0	0
2	DF	(Scotland) SCO	Phil Bardsley	37	3	32+2	3	0+1	0	2	0
3	DF	(England) ENG	Kieran Richardson	29	4	23+3	4	1	0	2	0
4	DF	(England) ENG	Michael Turner	16	0	15	0	0	0	1	0
5	DF	(Ghana) GHA	John Mensah	18	0	15+3	0	0	0	0	0
6	MF	(England) ENG	Lee Cattermole	24	0	22+1	0	0	0	1	0
7	MF	(Netherlands) NED	Boudewijn Zenden	29	2	10+17	2	0	0	1+1	0
8	MF	(France) FRA	Steed Malbranque	37	0	24+11	0	1	0	0+1	0
9	FW	(England) ENG	Fraizer Campbell	4	0	3	0	0	0	1	0
10	MF	(England) ENG	Jordan Henderson	39	3	37	3	0+1	0	1	0
11	MF	(Ghana) GHA	Sulley Muntari	9	0	7+2	0	0	0	0	0
11	FW	(England) ENG	Darren Bent*	23	11	20	8	1	1	2	2
12	DF	(Argentina) ARG	Marcos Angeleri	3	0	0+2	0	1	0	0	0
14	DF	(Paraguay) PAR	Paulo da Silva*	3	0	1	0	1	0	0+1	0
15	DF	(England) ENG	Nedum Onuoha	32	1	31	1	0	0	1	0
16	MF	(Paraguay) PAR	Cristian Riveros	14	1	5+7	1	1	0	1	0
17	FW	(England) ENG	Danny Welbeck	28	6	21+5	6	0	0	2	0
18	MF	(Republic of Ireland) IRL	David Meyler	5	0	4+1	0	0	0	0	0
19	DF	(England) ENG	Titus Bramble	24	0	22+1	0	0	0	1	0
20	MF	(Republic of Ireland) IRL	Andy Reid*	4	0	0+2	0	1	0	0+1	0
22	GK	(Belgium) BEL	Simon Mignolet	26	0	23	0	1	0	2	0
25	MF	(England) ENG	Jack Colback	12	0	6+5	0	0	0	1	0
26	MF	(England) ENG	Jordan Cook	3	0	0+3	0	0	0	0	0
26	FW	(England) ENG	Martyn Waghorn*	3	0	0+2	0	0	0	0+1	0
27	MF	(Egypt) EGY	Ahmed Elmohamady	38	0	26+10	0	0+1	0	1	0
28	MF	(Benin) BEN	Stéphane Sessègnon	14	3	13+1	3	0	0	0	0
29	DF	(England) ENG	Anton Ferdinand	29	0	23+4	0	0	0	2	0
31	FW	(England) ENG	Ryan Noble	3	0	0+3	0	0	0	0	0
33	FW	(Ghana) GHA	Asamoah Gyan	33	11	20+11	10	1	0	1	1

- Left club during season

=== First-team squad ===
Note: Flags indicate national team as defined under FIFA eligibility rules; some limited exceptions apply. Players may hold more than one non-FIFA nationality.

No.	Pos.	Nation	Player
1	GK	SCO	Craig Gordon
2	DF	SCO	Phil Bardsley
3	MF	ENG	Kieran Richardson
4	DF	ENG	Michael Turner
5	DF	GHA	John Mensah (on loan from Lyon)
6	MF	ENG	Lee Cattermole (captain)
7	MF	NED	Boudewijn Zenden (vice-captain)
8	MF	FRA	Steed Malbranque
9	FW	ENG	Fraizer Campbell
10	MF	ENG	Jordan Henderson
11	MF	GHA	Sulley Muntari (on loan from Internazionale)
12	DF	ARG	Marcos Angeleri

No.	Pos.	Nation	Player
15	DF	ENG	Nedum Onuoha (on loan from Manchester City)
16	MF	PAR	Cristian Riveros
17	FW	ENG	Danny Welbeck (on loan from Manchester United)
18	MF	IRL	David Meyler
19	DF	ENG	Titus Bramble
22	GK	BEL	Simon Mignolet
24	GK	NIR	Trevor Carson
25	MF	ENG	Jack Colback
27	MF	EGY	Ahmed Elmohamady
28	MF	BEN	Stéphane Sessègnon
29	DF	ENG	Anton Ferdinand
33	FW	GHA	Asamoah Gyan

== Transfers ==
=== In ===
No.	Pos.	Nat.	Name	Age	EU	Moving from	Type	Transfer window	Ends	Transfer fee	Source
16	MF	(Paraguay)	Riveros	27	Non-EU	Cruz Azul (Mexico)	Transfer	Summer		Free	
22	GK	(Belgium)	Mignolet	21	EU	Sint-Truiden (Belgium)	Transfer	Summer		£2,000,000	
34	MF	(England)	Knott	17	EU	Chelsea	Transfer	Summer		Free	
27	DF	(Egypt)	Elmohamady	22	Non-EU	ENPPI (Egypt)	Loan transfer	Summer		Loan	
19	DF	(England)	Bramble	28	EU	Wigan Athletic	Transfer	Summer		£1,000,000	
12	DF	(Argentina)	Angeleri	27	Non-EU	Estudiantes (LP) (Argentina)	Transfer	Summer		£1,500,000	
17	FW	(England)	Welbeck	19	EU	Manchester United	Loan transfer	Summer		Loan	
15	DF	(England)	Onuoha	23	EU	Manchester City	Loan Transfer	Summer		Loan	
5	DF	(Ghana)	Mensah	27	Non-EU	Lyon (France)	Loan transfer	Summer		Loan	
33	FW	(Ghana)	Gyan	24	Non-EU	Rennes (France)	Transfer	Summer		£13,000,000	
11	MF	(Ghana)	Muntari	26	Non-EU	Internazionale (Italy)	Loan transfer	Winter		Loan	
28	MF	(Benin)	Sessègnon	26	Non-EU	Paris Saint-Germain (France)	Transfer	Winter		£6,000,000	

=== Out ===
No.	Pos.	Nat.	Name	Age	EU	Moving to	Type	Transfer window	Transfer fee	Source
30	FW	(Republic of Ireland)	O'Donovan	24	EU	Coventry City (England)	Transfer	Summer	Free	
27	FW	(Republic of Ireland)	Murphy	27	EU	Celtic (Scotland)	Transfer	Summer	£1,400,000	
3	DF	(Jamaica)	Nosworthy	29	EU	Sheffield United	Loan transfer	Summer	Loan	
19	MF	(Albania)	Cana	26	EU	Galatasaray (Turkey)	Transfer	Summer	£5,000,000	
34	MF	(Republic of Ireland)	Hourihane	19	EU	Ipswich Town (England)	Transfer	Summer	Free	
21	GK	(Hungary)	Fülöp	27	EU	Ipswich Town (England)	Transfer	Summer	Undisclosed	
17	FW	(Trinidad and Tobago)	K. Jones	25	Non-EU	Stoke City (England)	Transfer	Summer	£8,000,000	
36	DF	(England)	Kilgallon	26	EU	Middlesbrough	Loan transfer	Summer	Loan	
3	DF	(Republic of Ireland)	Liddle	20	EU	Leyton Orient (England)	Loan transfer	Summer	Loan	
2	DF	(France)	Mvoto	21	EU	Oldham Athletic (England)	Loan transfer	Summer	Loan	
36	FW	(France)	Tounkara	20	EU	Oldham Athletic (England)	Loan transfer	Summer	Loan	
14	FW	(England)	Waghorn	20	EU	Leicester City	Transfer	Summer	£3,000,000	
19	MF	(Finland)	Tainio	30	EU	Ajax (Netherlands)	Transfer	Summer	Free	
29	FW	(England)	Noble	19	EU	Derby County	Loan transfer	None	Loan	
24	DF	(England)	Kay	20	EU	Gateshead	Loan transfer	None	Loan	
36	MF	(England)	Colback	20	EU	Ipswich Town	Loan transfer	None	Loan	
29	DF	(Northern Ireland)	McCartney	29	EU	Leeds United (England)	Loan transfer	None	Loan	
24	MF	(Republic of Ireland)	Reid	28	EU	Sheffield United (England)	Loan transfer	None	Loan	
19	FW	(Northern Ireland)	Healy	31	EU	Doncaster Rovers (England)	Loan transfer	None	Loan	
21	MF	(Northern Ireland)	Weir	21	EU	York City (England)	Loan transfer	None	Loan	
24	DF	(Republic of Ireland)	Liddle	21	EU	Gateshead (England)	Loan transfer	Winter	Loan	
17	DF	(England)	Kay	21	EU	Tranmere Rovers	Loan transfer	Winter	Loan	
17	MF	(England)	Noble	19	EU	Carlisle United	Loan transfer	Winter	Loan	
27	DF	(England)	Kilgallon	26	EU	Doncaster Rovers	Loan transfer	Winter	Loan	
39	FW	(England)	Bent	26	EU	Aston Villa	Transfer	Winter	£18,000,000 (rising to £24,000,000)	
24	GK	(Northern Ireland)	Carson	22	EU	Lincoln City (England)	Loan transfer	Winter	Loan	
15	FW	(Northern Ireland)	Healy	31	EU	Rangers (Scotland)	Loan transfer	Winter	Loan	
19	DF	(Paraguay)	da Silva	30	Non-EU	Zaragoza (Spain)	Transfer	Winter	Undisclosed	
43	MF	(Republic of Ireland)	Reid	28	EU	Blackpool (England)	Transfer	Winter	£1,000,000	
10	MF	(Northern Ireland)	Weir	22	EU	Tranmere Rovers (England)	Loan transfer	None	Loan	
26	MF	(England)	Reed	19	EU	Brentford	Loan transfer	None	Loan	
27	MF	(England)	Cook	21	EU	Walsall	Loan transfer	None	Loan	
41	GK	(Northern Ireland)	Carson	23	EU	Brentford (England)	Loan transfer	None	Loan	

EU = if holds or not a European Union passport; Country: when 2 flags, 1st flag = country that plays for internationally, 2nd flag = country of birth; N = number on jersey; P = Position (for position name, pause mouse pointer on abbreviation); Name = Name on jersey (for more extensive name, pause mouse pointer on name); Age = age on the day of the signing; Moving from = only indicate the club the player was playing before start playing for this club in this season, for the type of the moving see Status column; Moving to = only indicates the club the player is going to play next, for the type of the moving see Status column; Ends = when the player's current contract ends; n/a = Not applicable.

== Awards ==
Players' Player of the Year	Fans' Player of the Year	Young Player of the Year	Goal of the Season	Save of the Season	Performance of the Season
Phil Bardsley	Phil Bardsley	Jordan Henderson	Nedum Onuoha against Chelsea	Craig Gordon against Bolton Wanderers	3–0 win against Chelsea

== See also ==
- Sunderland A.F.C. seasons
