= Mike Jones (referee) =

English football referee

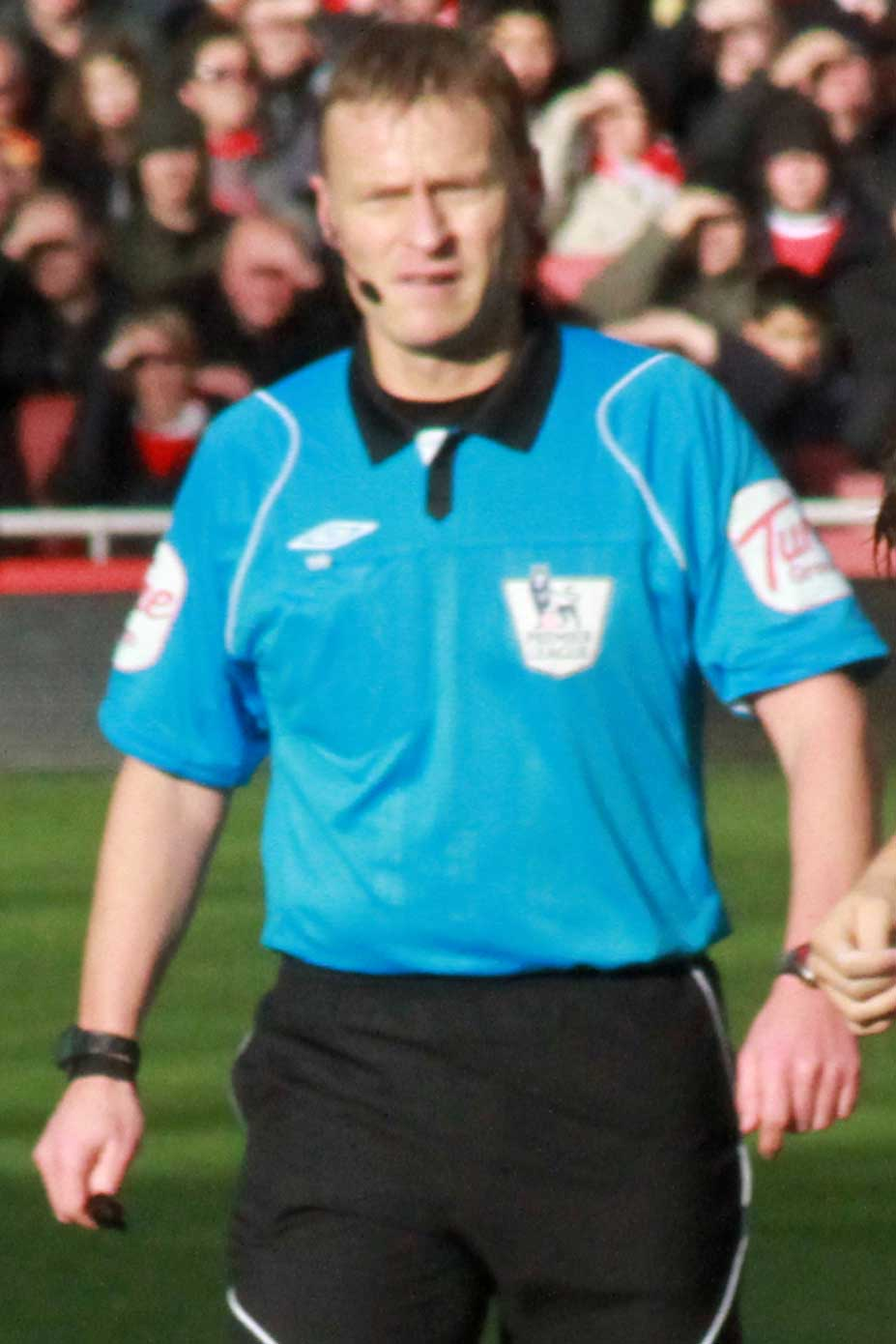
- Full name: Michael J. Jones
- Born: 18 April 1968 (age 58); Chester, England

Domestic
Years	League	Role
1997–2018	The Football League	Referee
2008–2018	Premier League	Referee

Michael J. Jones (born 18 April 1968) is an English retired professional football referee based in Chester. He is a member of the Cheshire County Football Association.

He began refereeing in the Football League in 1997 and was promoted in 2008 to the list of Select Group Referees who officiate all Premier League fixtures. In 2009, he refereed the FA Trophy final at Wembley Stadium. Jones is currently the National Group Director of the PGMOL.

== Career ==
Jones was promoted to the Football League's list of referees in 1997, his first match in charge being Mansfield Town against Hull City in August of that year.

His first game at Wembley Stadium was also in 2007: the Football League Two play-off final which saw Bristol Rovers defeat Shrewsbury Town 3–1. Jones dismissed Shrewsbury's Marc Tierney in the last minute for a second bookable offence: Tierney became the second man to be sent off at the new Wembley.

In 2008 Jones became a Select Group referee, allowing him to regularly officiate games in the Premier League. His first match in England's top flight was Hull City versus Wigan Athletic.

In October 2009 Jones allowed a goal scored by Darren Bent for Sunderland against Liverpool, when his shot took a deflection off a beach ball which had been thrown onto the pitch by a fan in the Liverpool supporters' section. He was subsequently demoted for one week to officiate a match in the Football League Championship. The beach ball from the incident was sent for display at England's National Football Museum in Manchester.

Jones was the fourth official for the 2012 FA Cup final, with Phil Dowd taking charge.

In the final moments of a 2013 Premier League game between Norwich City and Cardiff City, Cardiff's goalkeeper David Marshall put the ball out of play to allow Norwich's Alexander Tettey to receive treatment from a physio. Ricky van Wolfswinkel took the subsequent throw for Norwich and his teammate Leroy Fer tapped the ball into the net as Marshall looked on. The goal was disallowed by Jones who stated he had not blown his whistle to restart play. Cardiff's manager Malky Mackay praised the official's decision.

Former Premier League referee Dermot Gallagher told Sky Sports Jones refereed his final game on Saturday 5 May 2018 due to retirement. The match at The Hawthorns saw West Bromwich Albion beat Tottenham Hotspur 1–0.

== Statistics ==
Season	Games	Total (yellow card)	(yellow card) per game	Total (red card)	(red card) per game
1997/98	29	68	2.34	2	0.07
1998/99	33	82	2.48	4	0.12
1999/00	38	82	2.16	5	0.13
2000/01	34	68	2.00	10	0.29
2001/02	36	111	3.08	9	0.25
2002/03	30	76	2.53	3	0.10
2003/04	33	103	3.12	8	0.24
2004/05	37	88	2.38	7	0.19
2005/06	39	109	2.79	5	0.13
2006/07	41	160	3.90	12	0.29
2007/08	45	134	2.98	7	0.15
2008/09	38	110	2.89	6	0.16
2009/10	33	110	3.33	5	0.15
2010/11	35	119	3.40	6	0.17
2011/12	33	112	3.39	9	0.27
2012/13	31	85	2.74	3	0.10

Statistics are for all competitions. There are no available records prior to 1997/98.
