= Sunderland A.F.C. 1–0 Liverpool F.C. (2009) =

Sunderland 1–0 Liverpool
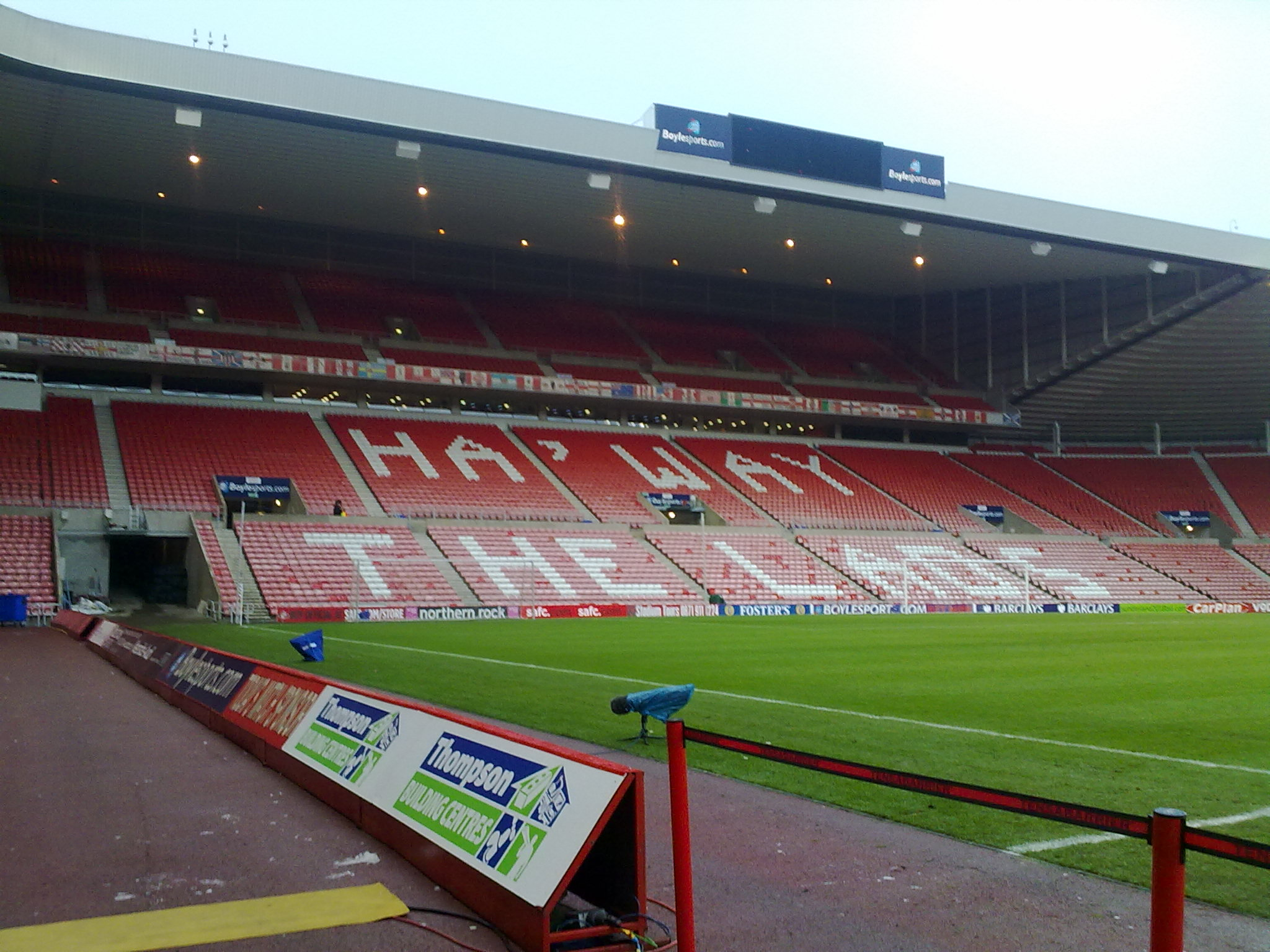
- Event: 2009–10 Premier League
| Sunderland | Liverpool |
| 1 | 0 |
- Date: 17 October 2009
- Venue: Stadium of Light, Sunderland
- Referee: Mike Jones
- Attendance: 47,327

On 17 October 2009, Sunderland defeated Liverpool 1–0 in a Premier League match at the Stadium of Light. Sunderland forward Darren Bent scored the only goal of the game, as the match ball took a deflection off a beach ball that had been launched onto the pitch by a Liverpool supporter. Under the Laws of the Game, referee Mike Jones should have disallowed the goal due to contact with an outside object and resumed play from a dropped-ball.

Liverpool manager Rafael Benítez was unaware that the goal should not have stood, and did not blame Jones for allowing the goal, while goalkeeper Pepe Reina believed it was the referee's job to know the law. Jones was criticised by his former refereeing colleagues, and temporarily demoted to the Championship. The boy who launched the beach ball onto the pitch received death threats. The beach ball was obtained by another Liverpool fan, auctioned for Alder Hey Children's Hospital, bought by a Sunderland fan for £411 and donated to the National Football Museum.

== Background ==
=== Sunderland ===
Managed by Steve Bruce, Sunderland had a record of four wins and three losses from their first eight games, with their last result on 3 October being a 2–2 draw away to Manchester United. Darren Bent, a £16.5 million signing from Tottenham Hotspur, had scored seven goals in eight games.

=== Liverpool ===
After finishing as runners-up to rivals Manchester United in 2008–09, Liverpool had a poor start to the following season. Issues included the loss of midfielder Xabi Alonso to Real Madrid, the financial affairs of owners Tom Hicks and George Gillett, and injuries to Steven Gerrard and Fernando Torres. Liverpool had lost three of their eight league fixtures before this match, and their last two results were losses to Fiorentina in the UEFA Champions League and Chelsea in the Premier League.

== Match ==
Sunderland had an early opportunity from Andy Reid after two minutes. In the fifth minute, Reid ran down the right side of the pitch and passed the ball to Bent in the centre. With his first touch, 14 yards from goal, Bent shot towards goal. Liverpool goalkeeper Pepe Reina lowered himself to receive the match ball, but it took a deflection off the beach ball six yards out, and went into the goal.

According to BBC Sport reporter Mandeep Sanghera, Sunderland dominated the midfield with Lorik Cana and Lee Cattermole, and Liverpool were limited to long-range shots, attempted by Ryan Babel, Fábio Aurélio and Jay Spearing. Bent had chances to extend the lead that he missed, while in the seven minutes of added time, Sunderland goalkeeper Craig Gordon saved from Dirk Kuyt and David Ngog.

=== Details ===
17 October 2009
15:00

| Sunderland | 1–0 | Liverpool |
|---|---|---|
| Bent 5'; Cana (yellow card) 8'; Reid (yellow card) 52' | Report | Kuyt (yellow card) 29' |

Stadium of Light, Sunderland
Attendance: 47,327
Referee: Mike Jones (Cheshire)

| Sunderland | Liverpool |

| GK | 1 | (Scotland) Craig Gordon |
| RB | 2 | (Scotland) Phil Bardsley |
| CB | 4 | (England) Michael Turner |
| CB | 5 | (England) Anton Ferdinand |
| LB | 3 | (Northern Ireland) George McCartney | | (substituted off) 46' |
| RM | 8 | (France) Steed Malbranque |
| CM | 19 | (Albania) Lorik Cana (c) | (yellow card) 8' |
| CM | 39 | (England) Lee Cattermole | | (substituted off) 58' |
| LM | 20 | (Republic of Ireland) Andy Reid | (yellow card) 52' |
| CF | 11 | (England) Darren Bent |
| CF | 17 | (Trinidad and Tobago) Kenwyne Jones | | (substituted off) 66' |
Substitutes:
| GK | 32 | (Hungary) Márton Fülöp |
| DF | 6 | (Jamaica) Nyron Nosworthy |
| DF | 22 | (Paraguay) Paulo da Silva |
| MF | 7 | (Netherlands) Bolo Zenden | | (substituted on) 58' |
| MF | 16 | (England) Jordan Henderson | | (substituted on) 46' |
| FW | 9 | (England) Fraizer Campbell | | (substituted on) 66' |
| FW | 23 | (Northern Ireland) David Healy |
Manager:
(England) Steve Bruce

| GK | 25 | (Spain) Pepe Reina |
| RB | 2 | (England) Glen Johnson |
| CB | 5 | (Denmark) Daniel Agger |
| CB | 37 | (Slovakia) Martin Škrtel | | (substituted off) 72' |
| CB | 23 | (England) Jamie Carragher(c) |
| LB | 6 | (Brazil) Fábio Aurélio |
| RM | 21 | (Brazil) Lucas Leiva |
| CM | 15 | (Israel) Yossi Benayoun |
| CM | 26 | (England) Jay Spearing | | (substituted off) 72' |
| LM | 19 | (Netherlands) Ryan Babel | | (substituted off) 81' |
| CF | 18 | (Netherlands) Dirk Kuyt | (yellow card) 29' |
Substitutes:
| GK | 1 | (Brazil) Diego Cavalieri |
| DF | 22 | (Argentina) Emiliano Insúa |
| DF | 34 | (England) Martin Kelly |
| MF | 11 | (Spain) Albert Riera |
| MF | 20 | (Argentina) Javier Mascherano | | (substituted on) 72' |
| FW | 10 | (Ukraine) Andriy Voronin | | (substituted on) 72' |
| FW | 24 | (France) David Ngog | | (substituted on) 81' |
Manager:
(Spain) Rafael Benítez

== Reaction ==
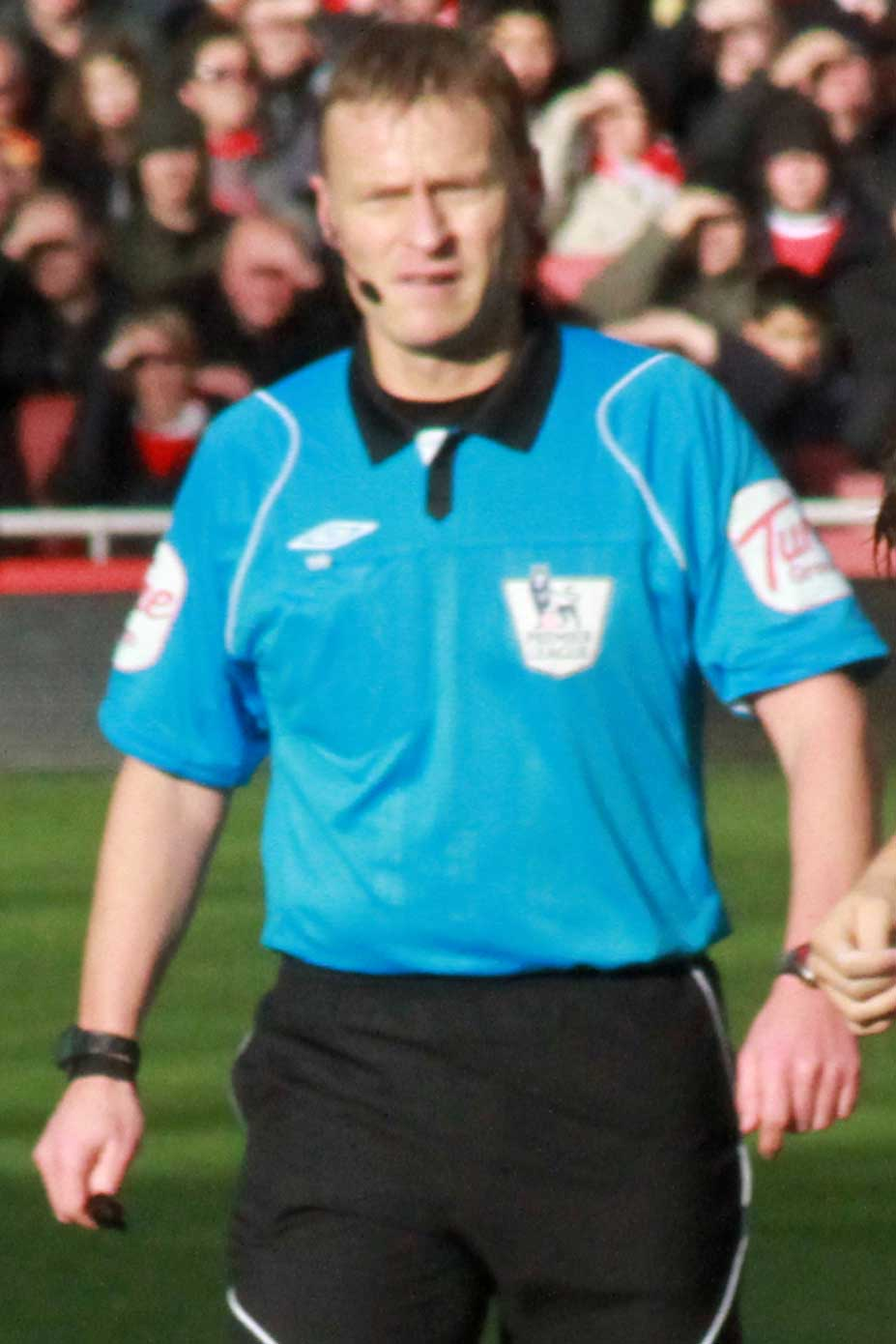
Referee Mike Jones allowed the only goal of the game, when it should have been disallowed due to contact with the beach ball

Liverpool manager Rafael Benítez believed that Liverpool lost the match through not taking their chances, before adding "It's a bad situation for us that the [beach] ball was in the middle and was influential but again I will say we didn't play well". Benítez was unaware that the goal should have been disallowed under the Laws of the Game. Bruce was told of the law between the game and his post-match interview, and joked "If you really know that rule then you are a little bit sad.[...] I always thought it's Sod's Law and you carry on". Reina told a radio station in his native Spain that he conceded the goal because his instincts made him move to save the beach ball; he said that none of the players were aware of the law and that made the referee's decision worse as it was his responsibility. The Premier League ruled that the match would not be replayed.

Former Premier League referee Jeff Winter told BBC Radio 5 Live that he was amazed that Jones, the two assistant referees and the fourth official did not object to the goal. Former colleagues Dermot Gallagher and Graham Poll also criticised Jones, who was temporarily demoted to the Championship following the decision.

A 16-year-old boy named Callum Campbell told the Sunday Mirror later in October 2009 that he had launched the ball onto the pitch. He said that he vomited when he returned home, and locked himself inside due to online death threats. Campbell's interview fee was donated to the Hillsborough disaster justice campaign.

The incident has been compared to one in the FA Cup in January 2008, in which Sheffield United's Luton Shelton scored in a win over Manchester City via a deflection off a sky blue balloon, again launched by away fans. Stu Cowan of The Gazette in Montreal, Canada, likened the Sunderland goal to the Steve Bartman incident, in which a Chicago Cubs baseball fan interfered to the disadvantage of his team.

=== Beach ball ===
The beach ball was official Liverpool F.C. merchandise, sold as part of a beach set with a bag and towel for £20. According to Wayne Bate, the Liverpool fan who was given the ball after the game, it was one of many that were kicked into the crowd by players and coaching staff during the warm-up. After the goal, a steward deflated the beach ball and weighed it down. Bate, who was on the front row, asked to have it after the game, first intending "to stab the bloody thing", but then gave it to cheer up his four-year-old son. Bate auctioned the ball for Alder Hey Children's Hospital, raising £411 in November 2009. The buyer was Sunderland fan Kevin Barlow, who then donated it to the National Football Museum in Manchester. While the museum exhibits many different balls, it described the beach ball as one of its most unusual exhibits and noted that the damage on its seam from the match makes inflation difficult; the ball is exhibited in a section on the laws of the game.

=== Retrospectives ===
Ten years after the game, Liverpool's Jamie Carragher told The Athletic "I never lost a game of football in stranger circumstances. I mean, what the hell was it even doing there? Who takes a beach ball to the north-east in the middle of October?". He reflected of the season, in which Liverpool finished 7th and Benítez left the club "So much went wrong and the beach ball was one chapter in that". Reina said that he was often asked why he did not remove the beach ball before the goal, but he did not notice it until the event. The Premier League denied permission for Jones, by then the director of Professional Game Match Officials Limited, to speak to The Athletic, saying "Mike’s not keen to dwell on it".

According to Bent in 2021, Jones asked him at half time if the shot had been deflected from the beach ball, and then appeared to panic upon being told that it had. Bent also said that year that despite being one of few players with 100 Premier League goals, he was only asked by fans about the beach ball goal.
