= 2009–10 Sunderland A.F.C. season =

English football club season

Sunderland
2009–10 season
- Chairman: Niall Quinn
- Manager: Steve Bruce (from 3 June)
- Premier League: 13th
- FA Cup: Fourth round
- League Cup: Fourth round
- Top goalscorer: League: Darren Bent (24); All: Darren Bent (25)
- Highest home attendance: 47,641, Manchester United, Premier League, 2 May 2010
- Lowest home attendance: 20,576, Birmingham City, League Cup, 22 September 2009
- Average home league attendance: 40,355
Home colours	Away colours	Third colours

The 2009–10 season is Sunderland's third consecutive season in the top division of English football, the Premier League.

Ricky Sbragia was replaced by Steve Bruce in the close season. His aim is to improve on the club's 16th position the previous season.

Darren Bent was the top scorer in the Premier League with 24 goals. Andy Reid was the top scorer in the League Cup with two goals. Fraizer Campbell was the top scorer in the FA Cup with two goals. Darren Bent was the top scorer in all competitions with 25 goals.

At the end of the season, Darren Bent won both the club's official Player of the Season and the SAFC Supporters' Association awards. Jordan Henderson won both the club's official Young Player of the Season and the SAFC Supporters' Association Young Player of the Season awards.

== Season summary ==
Sunderland broke their transfer record with the £10 million signing of Tottenham Hotspur striker Darren Bent. This proved to be a wise investment as Bent scored 25 goals in all competitions during the season, all but one of them in the league. No other player outside the top eight clubs managed even half as many as Bent, who was only outscored by Didier Drogba and Wayne Rooney.

== Transfers ==
=== In ===
Date	Pos.	Nat.	Name	From	Fee	Ref.
11 July 2009	FW	ENG	Fraizer Campbell	Manchester United	£3,500,000	
13 July 2009	DF	PAR	Paulo da Silva	Deportivo Toluca	Undisclosed	
24 July 2009	MF	ALB	Lorik Cana	Marseille	£5,000,000	
5 August 2009	FW	ENG	Darren Bent	Tottenham Hotspur	£10,000,000 (rising to £16,000,000)	
12 August 2009	MF	ENG	Lee Cattermole	Wigan Athletic	£6,000,000	
31 August 2009	DF	ENG	Michael Turner	Hull City	£4,000,000	
16 October 2009	MF	NED	Bolo Zenden	Marseille	Free	
21 January 2010	DF	ENG	Matthew Kilgallon	Sheffield United	Undisclosed	

=== Loans in ===
Date	Pos.	Nat.	Name	From	Length	Ref.
28 August 2009	DF	GHA	John Mensah	Lyon	Season-long loan	
1 February 2010	DF	SCO	Alan Hutton	Tottenham Hotspur	Season-long loan	
2 February 2010	FW	ZIM	Benjani Mwaruwari	Manchester City	Season-long loan	

=== Out ===
Date	Pos.	Nat.	Name	To	Fee	Ref.
30 June 2009	FW	TRI	Dwight Yorke	Retired	Released	
30 June 2009	FW	IRL	David Connolly	(Southampton)	Released	
30 June 2009	MF	ESP	Arnau Riera		Released	
30 June 2009	GK	WAL	Darren Ward		Released	
30 June 2009	GK	IRL	Nick Colgan	(Grimsby Town)	Released	
30 June 2009	DF	ENG	Peter Hartley	(Hartlepool United)	Released	
30 June 2009	DF	IRL	Niall McArdle		Released	
3 July 2009	DF	ENG	Greg Halford	Wolverhampton Wanderers	£2,000,000	
4 July 2009	FW	ENG	Michael Chopra	Cardiff City	£4,000,000	
24 July 2009	MF	ENG	Dean Whitehead	Stoke City	£5,000,000	
21 August 2009	FW	IRL	Anthony Stokes	Hibernian	£500,000	
30 August 2009	DF	IRL	Paul McShane	Hull City	£1,500,000	
1 September 2009	DF	WAL	Danny Collins	Stoke City	£2,275,000	
1 September 2009	MF	ENG	Grant Leadbitter	Ipswich Town	£2,600,000	
1 September 2009	MF	TRI	Carlos Edwards	Ipswich Town	£1,400,000	
14 January 2010	DF	SCO	Russell Anderson	Derby County	Free	

=== Loans out ===
Date	Pos.	Nat.	Name	To	Length	Ref.
1 September 2009	MF	FIN	Teemu Tainio	Birmingham City	Season-long loan	
17 September 2009	FW	IRE	Roy O'Donovan	Southend United	One month	
1 February 2010	DF	JAM	Nyron Nosworthy	Sheffield United	Season-long loan	
1 February 2010	FW	IRL	Daryl Murphy	Ipswich Town	Season-long loan	
1 February 2010	FW	NIR	David Healy	Ipswich Town	Season-long loan	
23 February 2010	FW	IRE	Roy O'Donovan	Hartlepool United	Season-long loan	
27 April 2010	GK	HUN	Márton Fülöp	Manchester City	Season-long loan	

== First-team squad ==
Note: Flags indicate national team as defined under FIFA eligibility rules; some limited exceptions apply. Players may hold more than one non-FIFA nationality.

No.	Pos.	Nation	Player
1	GK	SCO	Craig Gordon
2	DF	SCO	Phil Bardsley
3	DF	NIR	George McCartney
4	DF	ENG	Michael Turner
5	DF	ENG	Anton Ferdinand
6	DF	SCO	Alan Hutton (on loan from Tottenham Hotspur)
7	MF	NED	Bolo Zenden
8	MF	FRA	Steed Malbranque
9	FW	ENG	Fraizer Campbell
10	DF	ENG	Kieran Richardson (vice-captain)
11	FW	ENG	Darren Bent
12	DF	GHA	John Mensah (on loan from Lyon)
15	MF	ENG	Liam Noble
16	MF	ENG	Jordan Henderson

No.	Pos.	Nation	Player
17	FW	TRI	Kenwyne Jones
18	MF	IRL	David Meyler
19	MF	ALB	Lorik Cana (captain)
20	MF	IRL	Andy Reid
22	DF	PAR	Paulo da Silva
24	GK	NIR	Trevor Carson
25	FW	IRL	Roy O'Donovan
26	MF	ENG	Adam Reed
27	DF	ENG	Matthew Kilgallon
28	FW	ZIM	Benjani Mwaruwari (on loan from Manchester City)
29	MF	ENG	Jack Colback
30	FW	ENG	Ryan Noble
32	GK	HUN	Márton Fülöp
39	MF	ENG	Lee Cattermole

=== Left club during season ===
Note: Flags indicate national team as defined under FIFA eligibility rules; some limited exceptions apply. Players may hold more than one non-FIFA nationality.

No.	Pos.	Nation	Player
4	MF	FIN	Teemu Tainio (on loan to Birmingham City)
6	DF	JAM	Nyron Nosworthy
7	MF	TRI	Carlos Edwards (to Ipswich Town)
14	FW	IRL	Daryl Murphy
15	DF	WAL	Danny Collins (to Stoke City)

No.	Pos.	Nation	Player
18	MF	ENG	Grant Leadbitter (to Ipswich Town)
23	FW	NIR	David Healy
27	DF	SCO	Russell Anderson
30	DF	IRL	Paul McShane

== Results ==
=== Premier League ===
Pos	Team	Pld	W	D	L	GF	GA	GD	Pts
11	Stoke City	38	11	14	13	34	48	−14	47
12	Fulham	38	12	10	16	39	46	−7	46
13	Sunderland	38	11	11	16	48	56	−8	44
14	Bolton Wanderers	38	10	9	19	42	67	−25	39
15	Wolverhampton Wanderers	38	9	11	18	32	56	−24	38

Source: Barclays Premier League

Win	Draw	Loss

Date	Opponents	Venue	Result	Scorers	Attendance	League position	Ref.
15 August 2009	Bolton Wanderers	Reebok Stadium	1–0	Bent 5'	22,247	8th	
18 August 2009	Chelsea	Stadium of Light	1–3	Bent 18'	41,179	10th	
22 August 2009	Blackburn Rovers	Stadium of Light	2–1	Jones (2) 31', 53'	37,106	6th	
29 August 2009	Stoke City	Britannia Stadium	0–1		27,091	8th	
12 September 2009	Hull City	Stadium of Light	4–1	Bent (2) 12' (pen), 66', Reid 49', Zayatte 75' (o.g.)	38,997	6th	
19 September 2009	Burnley	Turf Moor	1–3	Bent 38'	20,196	8th	
27 September 2009	Wolverhampton Wanderers	Stadium of Light	5–2	Bent 8' (pen), Jones (2) 47' (pen), 69', Turner 73', Mancienne 90' (o.g.)	37,566	8th	
3 October 2009	Manchester United	Old Trafford	2–2	Bent 7', Jones 58'	75,114	8th	
17 October 2009	Liverpool	Stadium of Light	1–0	Bent 5'	47,327	7th	
24 October 2009	Birmingham City	St. Andrew's	1–2	Turner 82'	21,732	7th	
31 October 2009	West Ham United	Stadium of Light	2–2	Reid 38', Richardson 76'	39,033	8th	
7 November 2009	Tottenham Hotspur	White Hart Lane	0–2		35,955	8th	
21 November 2009	Arsenal	Stadium of Light	1–0	Bent 70'	44,918	8th	
28 November 2009	Wigan Athletic	DW Stadium	0–1		20,447	8th	
6 December 2009	Fulham	Craven Cottage	0–1		23,168	10th	
12 December 2009	Portsmouth	Stadium of Light	1–1	Bent 22'	37,578	10th	
15 December 2009	Aston Villa	Stadium of Light	0–2		34,821	10th	
19 December 2009	Manchester City	City of Manchester Stadium	3–4	Mensah 15', Henderson 24', Jones 62'	44,735	10th	
26 December 2009	Everton	Stadium of Light	1–1	Bent 17'	46,990	10th	
28 December 2009	Blackburn Rovers	Ewood Park	2–2	Bent (2) 52', 65'	25,656	10th	
16 January 2010	Chelsea	Stamford Bridge	2–7	Zenden 56', Bent 90'	41,776	12th	
27 January 2010	Everton	Goodison Park	0–2		32,163	13th	
1 February 2010	Stoke City	Stadium of Light	0–0		35,078	13th	
6 February 2010	Wigan Athletic	Stadium of Light	1–1	Jones 64'	38,350	13th	
9 February 2010	Portsmouth	Fratton Park	1–1	Bent 11' (pen)	16,242	13th	
20 February 2010	Arsenal	Emirates Stadium	0–2		60,083	14th	
28 February 2010	Fulham	Stadium of Light	0–0		40,192	14th	
9 March 2010	Bolton Wanderers	Stadium of Light	4–0	Campbell 1', Bent (3) 63', 74' (pen), 87'	36,087	13th	
14 March 2010	Manchester City	Stadium of Light	1–1	Jones 8'	41,398	14th	
20 March 2010	Birmingham City	Stadium of Light	3–1	Bent (2) 5', 11', Campbell 88'	37,962	12th	
24 March 2010	Aston Villa	Villa Park	1–1	Campbell 22'	37,473	13th	
28 March 2010	Liverpool	Anfield	0–3		43,121	13th	
3 April 2010	Tottenham Hotspur	Stadium of Light	3–1	Bent (2) 1', 29' (pen), Zenden 85'	43,184	13th	
10 April 2010	West Ham United	Boleyn Ground	0–1		34,685	13th	
17 April 2010	Burnley	Stadium of Light	2–1	Campbell 24', Bent 40'	41,341	13th	
24 April 2010	Hull City	KC Stadium	1–0	Bent 6'	25,012	10th	
2 May 2010	Manchester United	Stadium of Light	0–1		47,641	11th	
9 May 2010	Wolverhampton Wanderers	Molineux	1–2	Jones 7'	28,971	13th	

=== Football League Cup ===
Date	Round	Opponents	Venue	Result	Scorers	Attendance	Ref.
24 August 2009	Round 2	Norwich City	Carrow Road	4–1	Tainio 26', Reid (2) 29', 35', Tudur Jones 67' (o.g.)	12,345	
22 September 2009	Round 3	Birmingham City	Stadium of Light	2–0	Henderson 4', Campbell 22'	20,576	
27 October 2009	Round 4	Aston Villa	Stadium of Light	0–0 (1–3 on pens)		27,666	

=== FA Cup ===
Date	Round	Opponents	Venue	Result	Scorers	Attendance	Ref.
3 January 2010	Round 3	Barrow	Stadium of Light	3–0	Malbranque 17', Campbell (2) 52', 58'	25,190	
23 January 2010	Round 4	Portsmouth	Fratton Park	1–2	Bent 15'	10,315	

== Statistics ==
=== Appearances and goals ===
No.	Pos	Nat	Player	Total		Premier League		FA Cup		League Cup	
No.	Pos	Nat	Player	Apps	Goals	Apps	Goals	Apps	Goals	Apps	Goals
Goalkeepers
1	GK	(Scotland) SCO	Craig Gordon	30	0	26	0	1	0	3	0
32	GK	(Hungary) HUN	Márton Fülöp	14	0	12+1	0	1	0	0	0
Defenders
2	DF	(England) ENG	Phil Bardsley	28	0	18+8	0	2	0	0	0
3	DF	(Northern Ireland) NIR	George McCartney	28	0	20+5	0	1	0	2	0
4	DF	(England) ENG	Michael Turner	32	2	29	2	1	0	2	0
5	DF	(England) ENG	Anton Ferdinand	25	0	19+5	0	0	0	0+1	0
6	DF	(Scotland) SCO	Alan Hutton	11	0	11	0	0	0	0	0
12	DF	(Ghana) GHA	John Mensah	17	1	14+2	1	0	0	1	0
22	DF	(Paraguay) PAR	Paulo da Silva	21	0	12+4	0	2	0	3	0
27	DF	(England) ENG	Matt Kilgallon	7	0	6+1	0	0	0	0	0
33	DF	(England) ENG	Michael Liddle	1	0	0	0	0+1	0	0	0
Midfielders
7	MF	(Netherlands) NED	Boudewijn Zenden	21	2	1+19	2	1	0	0	0
8	MF	(France) FRA	Steed Malbranque	35	1	30+1	0	1	1	1+2	0
10	MF	(England) ENG	Kieran Richardson	32	1	28+1	1	1	0	2	0
16	MF	(England) ENG	Jordan Henderson	38	2	23+10	1	2	0	3	1
18	MF	(Republic of Ireland) IRL	David Meyler	12	0	9+1	0	2	0	0	0
19	MF	(Albania) ALB	Lorik Cana	35	0	29+2	0	2	0	2	0
20	MF	(Republic of Ireland) IRL	Andy Reid	25	4	18+3	2	0+1	0	2+1	2
29	MF	(England) ENG	Jack Colback	1	0	0+1	0	0	0	0	0
39	MF	(England) ENG	Lee Cattermole	22	0	19+3	0	0	0	0	0
Forwards
9	FW	(England) ENG	Fraizer Campbell	36	7	19+12	4	1+1	2	3	1
11	FW	(England) ENG	Darren Bent	40	25	38	24	2	1	0	0
14	FW	(Republic of Ireland) IRL	Daryl Murphy	7	0	2+1	0	1	0	1+2	0
17	FW	(Trinidad and Tobago) TRI	Kenwyne Jones	36	9	24+8	9	1	0	3	0
23	FW	(Northern Ireland) NIR	David Healy	7	0	0+3	0	0+2	0	0+2	0
28	FW	(Zimbabwe) ZIM	Benjani Mwaruwari	8	0	1+7	0	0	0	0	0
30	FW	(England) ENG	Ryan Noble	1	0	0	0	0+1	0	0	0
Players transferred out during the season
4	MF	(Finland) FIN	Teemu Tainio	1	1	0	0	0	0	1	1
6	DF	(Jamaica) JAM	Nyron Nosworthy	10	0	7+3	0	0	0	0	0
7	MF	(Trinidad and Tobago) TRI	Carlos Edwards	1	0	0	0	0	0	1	0
15	DF	(Wales) WAL	Danny Collins	3	0	3	0	0	0	0	0
18	MF	(England) ENG	Grant Leadbitter	1	0	0+1	0	0	0	0	0

Last updated: 31 May 2010
Source: Competitions

=== Goal scorers ===
Nation	Number	Name	Premier League	League Cup	FA Cup	Total
(England)	11	Darren Bent	24	0	1	25
(Trinidad and Tobago)	17	Kenwyne Jones	9	0	0	9
(England)	9	Fraizer Campbell	4	1	2	7
(Republic of Ireland)	20	Andy Reid	2	2	0	4
/	/	Own goals	2	1	0	3
(Netherlands)	7	Boudewijn Zenden	2	0	0	2
(England)	4	Michael Turner	2	0	0	2
(England)	16	Jordan Henderson	1	1	0	2
(England)	10	Kieran Richardson	1	0	0	1
(Ghana)	12	John Mensah	1	0	0	1
(France)	8	Steed Malbranque	0	0	1	1
(Finland)	4	Teemu Tainio	0	1	0	1
/	/	TOTALS	48	6	4	58
