= Darren Bent =

English footballer (born 1984)

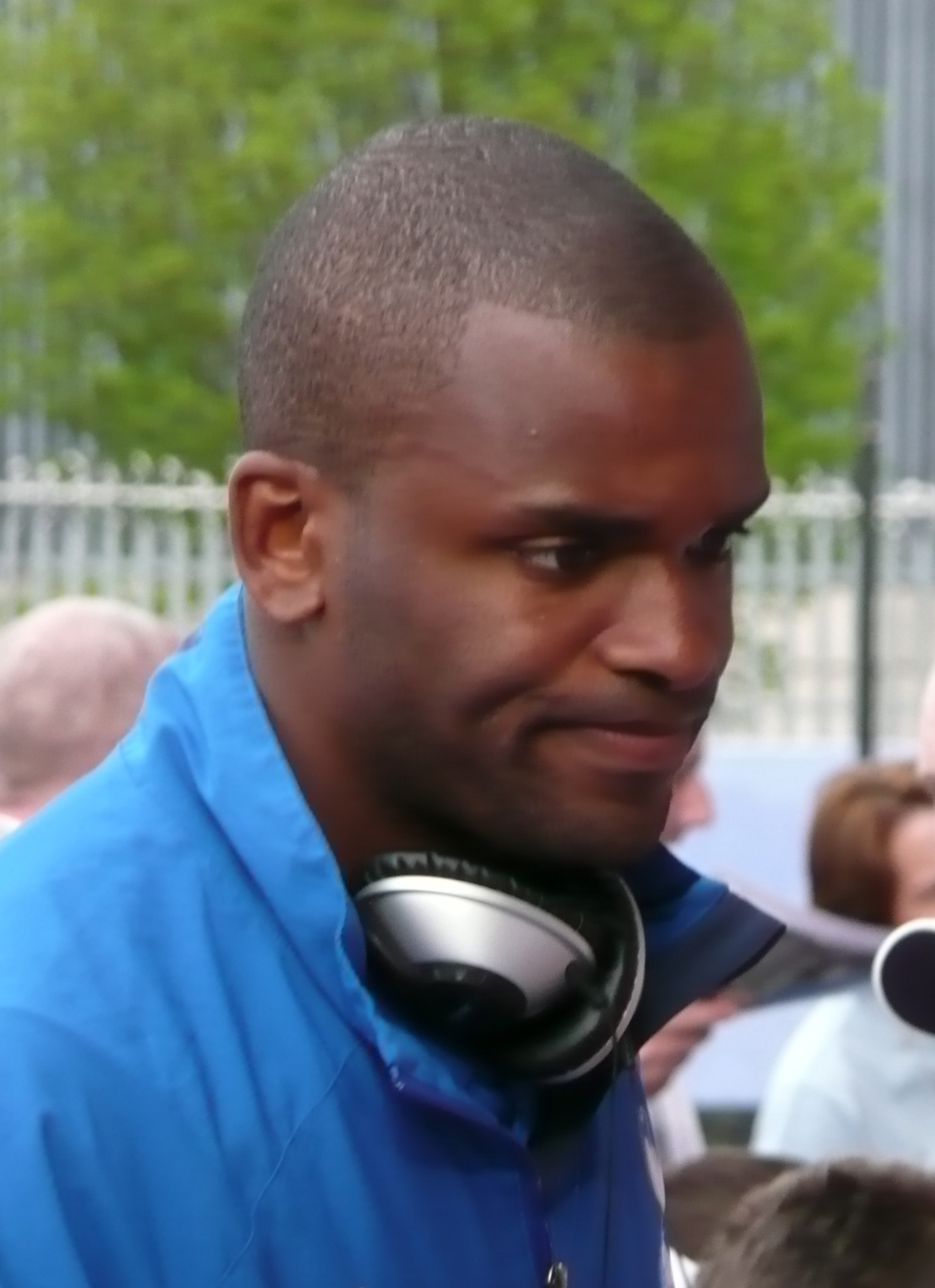
- Bent in 2008

Personal information
- Full name: Darren Ashley Bent
- Date of birth: 6 February 1984 (age 42)
- Place of birth: Tooting, England
- Height: 5 ft 11 in (1.80 m)
- Position: Striker

Youth career
- –1998: Godmanchester Rovers
- 1998–2001: Ipswich Town

Senior career*
| Years | Team | Apps | (Gls) |
| 2001–2005 | Ipswich Town | 122 | (48) |
| 2005–2007 | Charlton Athletic | 68 | (31) |
| 2007–2009 | Tottenham Hotspur | 60 | (18) |
| 2009–2011 | Sunderland | 58 | (32) |
| 2011–2015 | Aston Villa | 61 | (21) |
| 2013–2014 | → Fulham (loan) | 24 | (3) |
| 2014 | → Brighton & Hove Albion (loan) | 5 | (2) |
| 2015 | → Derby County (loan) | 15 | (10) |
| 2015–2018 | Derby County | 58 | (12) |
| 2018 | → Burton Albion (loan) | 15 | (2) |
| Total | | 486 | (179) |

International career
| 1999–2000 | England U15 | 8 | (7) |
| 2000–2001 | England U16 | 11 | (3) |
| 2002 | England U19 | 3 | (3) |
| 2003–2005 | England U21 | 14 | (9) |
| 2006–2011 | England | 13 | (4) |
- * Club domestic league appearances and goals

Darren Ashley Bent (born 6 February 1984) is an English former professional footballer who played as a striker and is currently a radio presenter for talkSPORT. He played in the Premier League and Championship for nine clubs, and at senior international level for the England national team.

Bent started his career with Godmanchester Rovers before being scouted by Ipswich Town. After progressing through their youth system, he made his first-team debut in 2001. He made 122 appearances and scored 48 goals in the league for Ipswich, before joining Charlton Athletic for a fee of £2.5 million in 2005. He was Charlton Athletic's top goalscorer for two consecutive seasons and joined Tottenham Hotspur for a club-record fee of £16.5 million in 2007. After two seasons at Tottenham, he joined Sunderland. After a successful 18 months at Sunderland, he joined Aston Villa in 2011. Bent had loans with Fulham, Brighton & Hove Albion and Derby County, and after being released by Villa in 2015, joined Derby permanently.

Bent represented England at under-15, under-16, under-19, under-21 and senior levels. He made 14 appearances and scored 9 goals for the under-21 team after making his debut against Italy in 2003. He made his debut for the senior England team in 2006 against Uruguay, and went on to make 13 appearances for England, scoring four goals. He scored his first goal on 7 September 2010 in a 3–1 UEFA Euro 2012 qualifying match victory against Switzerland.

== Club career ==
=== Ipswich Town ===
Bent progressed through Ipswich Town's youth system, having joined the club at age 14 in 1998, after considering a possible career in athletics. He signed a professional contract with Ipswich on 2 July 2001. He made his first-team debut on 1 November 2001 in a 3–1 victory against Helsingborg in the UEFA Cup, and scored his first senior goal in a 4–1 League Cup defeat to Newcastle United on 27 November 2001. Bent scored his first Premier League goal on 24 April 2002 in a 1–0 win over Middlesbrough. He finished the 2001–02 season with seven appearances and two goals in all competitions, and also saw his team Ipswich face relegation into the First Division.

He became a key part of Ipswich's first-team squad during the 2002–03 season. He scored his first goal of the season on 24 August, scoring the equalizing goal in a 1–1 draw with Millwall. On 31 October 2002 he scored the winning goal against Slovan Liberec in the UEFA Cup. On 2 March he scored in a 2–0 win against Norwich City in the East Anglian derby. Bent finished the 2002–03 season with 18 goals, while also winning Ipswich's Young Player of the Year award.

Bent signed a new contract with Ipswich on 13 June 2003, signing a deal until June 2006. He continued to feature regularly during the 2003–04 season. On 16 March, he scored a hat-trick in a 3–1 win over Walsall. Ipswich finished 5th in the league in the 2003–04 season, eventually losing out to West Ham United over two legs in the play-offs, with Bent scoring the winning goal in the first-leg as Ipswich won 1–0 at Portman Road, before losing the second-leg 0–2. Bent finished the season as Ipswich's top-scorer with 16 goals.

He once again helped Ipswich challenge for promotion during the following season, continuing his goal scoring form alongside strike partner Shefki Kuqi. Ipswich finished 3rd in the 2004–05 season, narrowly missing out on automatic promotion by two points, before losing out to West Ham United in the play-off semi-finals for the second consecutive season. He finished the season with 20 goals, being the team's joint highest goalscorer along with Shefki Kuqi.

=== Charlton Athletic ===
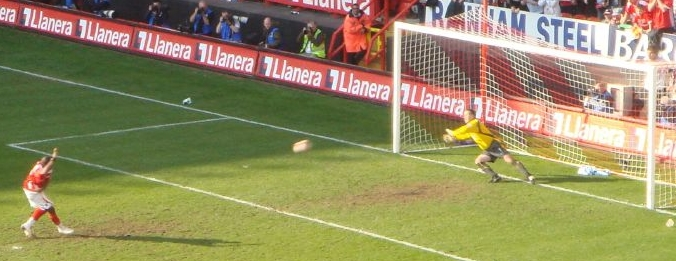
Bent scoring a penalty kick for Charlton Athletic in 2007

Bent completed a transfer to Charlton Athletic on 1 June 2005, which was worth an initial fee of £2.5 million, but would have risen to £3 million if he made an agreed number of appearances for Charlton and for England. On the opening day of the 2005–06 Premier League season, Bent scored two goals on his Charlton debut against Sunderland, and was named Premier League Player of the Month for August. He scored in his first four appearances for the club, one of only six players to perform this feat in the Premier League. Bent was the highest scoring Englishman in the Premier League in 2005–06, with 18 goals (22 overall), which made him third highest scorer and was given Charlton's Player of the Year award. He signed an extension to his contract at Charlton in July, which contracted him until June 2010. Bent finished 2006–07 with 13 goals in the Premier League, again finishing as Charlton's top goalscorer, but was unable to prevent them from being relegated into the Championship after seven successive seasons of Premier League football. Charlton accepted a bid from West Ham United for him in June 2007, but Bent was not interested in a move to the club.

=== Tottenham Hotspur ===
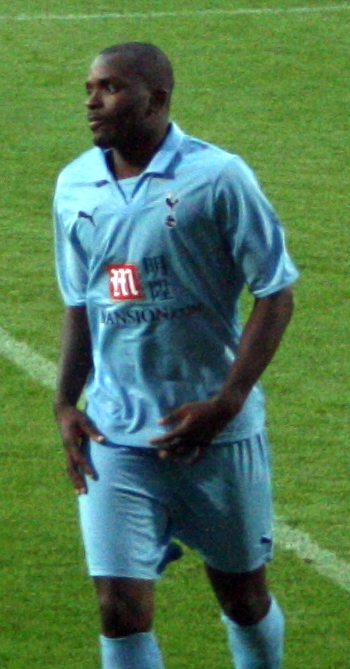
Bent playing for Tottenham Hotspur in 2008

Bent completed a move to Tottenham Hotspur for a club-record fee of £16.5 million on 29 June 2007, which was to be payable over three years and is inclusive of add-on payments. Ipswich were entitled to 20% of Charlton's profit on Bent under a sell-on clause, which gave the club an initial £2.58 million. He scored his first competitive goal for Tottenham in a 4–0 home victory over Derby County in August 2007. This was followed up by scoring in the 6–1 win over Anorthosis Famagusta in the first round of the UEFA Cup on 20 September 2007. Bent was an unused substitute for the 2008 League Cup Final at Wembley Stadium on 24 February, as Tottenham beat Chelsea 2–1 after extra time. He scored his 100th career goal on 9 March 2008 in the added time of a 4–0 league win over West Ham. He also scored the 100th goal to be scored at White Hart Lane during 2007–08 on 22 March in a 2–0 win over Portsmouth. Bent went on to score one more goal in the 2007–08 season, against Newcastle United, which he finished with 36 appearances and 8 goals.

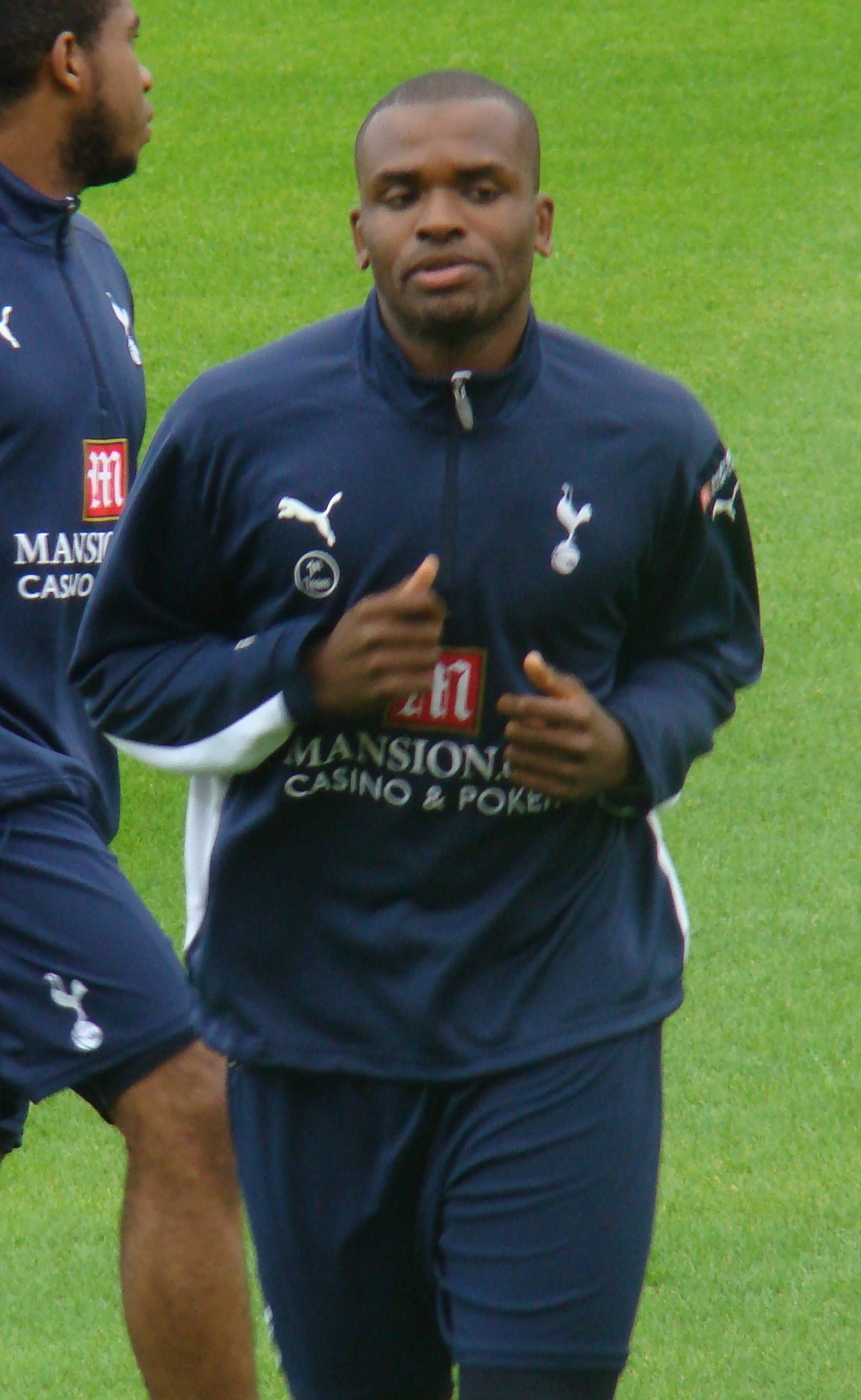
Bent training with Tottenham Hotspur in 2009

Bent scored 12 goals for Tottenham during the 2008–09 pre-season. His first league goal of the season came against Chelsea, which gave his team a 1–1 draw. He scored a header in the second half of Tottenham's UEFA Cup first round match against Wisła Kraków, giving the team a 2–1 victory. On 6 November, in a match against Dinamo Zagreb, Bent scored his first competitive hat-trick for Tottenham. He followed this up with two goals in a 2–1 victory against Manchester City at the City of Manchester Stadium.

A miss in front of an open goal in the final minutes during a home match against Portsmouth in January 2009, which cost Tottenham two points, prompted manager Harry Redknapp to claim, "You will never get a better chance to win a match than that. My missus could have scored that one." On 31 January, Bent scored two goals in the period of two minutes against Bolton Wanderers at the Reebok Stadium after coming on as a second-half substitute, in a match that eventually finished as a 3–2 defeat. Following the return of striker Robbie Keane at Tottenham, Redknapp assured Bent of his future at the club. He finished the season as Tottenham's top goalscorer with 17 goals in 43 matches.

=== Sunderland ===
Sunderland opened negotiations to sign Bent in July 2009. The deal seemed delayed and through social networking website Twitter he accused club chairman Daniel Levy of disrupting his move to Sunderland, although Bent later apologised, saying he acted out of frustration. He travelled to Sunderland to sign for the club after they agreed a fee with Tottenham, and after passing a medical, Bent signed for Sunderland on 5 August for an initial fee of £10 million plus potential additional payments, which later rose to £16.5 million. He scored on his Sunderland debut, which was the only goal in a 1–0 victory against Bolton, and was followed with Sunderland's opening goal against Chelsea in a 3–1 defeat. He scored a brace in the 4–1 win over Hull City to give himself his third and fourth goals in five matches.

Bent scored Sunderland's only goal against Burnley at Turf Moor, making the score 1–1, before losing 3–1. He scored again in a 5–2 win against Wolverhampton Wanderers, although after the match, Sunderland manager Steve Bruce was left angry at Bent's decision to give Sunderland's second penalty kick to teammate Kenwyne Jones, after the latter "pleaded" with Bent to take the penalty so that he could get on the score sheet. Bent scored in a 1–0 victory against Liverpool on 17 October 2009 when his shot hit a beach ball thrown onto the field by a Liverpool fan and past confused goalkeeper Pepe Reina into the net. He scored his first hat-trick for Sunderland in a 4–0 victory over Bolton on 9 March 2010. He scored two goals, one a penalty, but missed two other penalties as they were saved by Heurelho Gomes in a 3–1 victory against former club Tottenham on 3 April. Bent finished the 2009–10 season with 25 goals in 40 appearances in all competitions, 24 of which came in the Premier League, amounting to 50% of Sunderland's 48 goals in the league that season. He was named as Sunderland's Player of the Year.

Bent made his first appearance of 2010–11 in the opening match, a 2–2 draw with Birmingham City on 14 August and opened the scoring with a penalty in the 24th minute. He scored the winning goal with stoppage time penalty as Sunderland beat Manchester City 1–0 on 29 August. Bent scored the equaliser during stoppage time to earn Sunderland a 1–1 draw against Arsenal on 18 September. He then scored twice in Sunderland's 2–2 draw at Liverpool.

=== Aston Villa ===
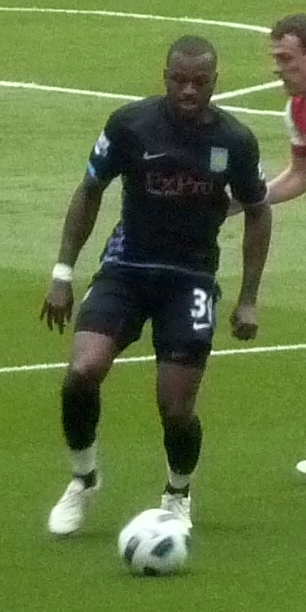
Bent playing for Aston Villa in 2011

On 17 January 2011, Bent submitted a transfer request, amid reports that Aston Villa had made a club-record £18 million bid for him, which was rejected. Villa then submitted an improved offer of £18 million, potentially rising to £24 million, which was then accepted. The following day, Bent completed his move to Villa and signed a four-and-a-half-year deal. He scored the winning goal on his debut against Manchester City in a 1–0 victory at Villa Park. Bent scored his second Villa goal in his third appearance for his team when he completed the full 90 minutes against Manchester United at Old Trafford in a 3–1 away defeat. Bent scored both of Villa's goals in their 2–1 away victory over Arsenal in the penultimate match of the season on 15 May. The first was a nicely crafted volley after he chested down a Kyle Walker chipped pass, with the second coming a few minutes later after a slip from Arsenal's Thomas Vermaelen allowed Ashley Young the time to thread a pass through the Gunners' defence and Bent to sidefoot home for 2–0. He finished the season with 9 goals in 16 Premier League appearances for Villa, becoming the club's joint top-scorer with Ashley Young, despite only joining in January. He was also the top English goalscorer in the Premier League and the fourth highest scorer overall that season with 17 goals, eight of which were scored for Sunderland.

In his first full season with Villa, Bent scored his first goal of the season against Blackburn Rovers in a 3–1 victory on 20 August 2011. In his first match against former club Sunderland, a 2–2 draw at the Stadium of Light on 29 October 2011, every time he received a touch on the ball, he was booed by the home support. Bent then suffered an injury during the match against Bolton and was out for the next few matches as a result. Bent caused controversy when a fan posted a picture and claimed the striker was out shopping while his teammates were losing 2–0 to Liverpool. It was later revealed Bent had been sent home to recover from his injury and afterwards he apologised to the Villa fans for his actions. After apologising, Villa manager Alex McLeish reacted angrily to the "conspiracy theory" over Bent's absence for Villa. This led to Bent having to deny a fall-out with McLeish. Bent made his return as a 78th-minute substitute in the match against Chelsea on 31 December 2011, scoring the third goal to seal a 3–1 win at Stamford Bridge. After not scoring in the next two matches, Bent went on a run by scoring in the next four matches for Villa, including his first FA Cup goal in a Villa shirt on 29 January 2012, against Arsenal in an eventual 3–2 defeat. Three days later, Bent scored his 100th Premier League goal as Villa came from behind to earn a 2–2 home draw against Queens Park Rangers. He was the 21st player to reach the milestone.

On 25 February 2012, in a match against Wigan Athletic, Bent landed awkwardly on his ankle after tangling with Antolín Alcaraz. He was stretchered off the pitch with what was thought to be a serious injury. This was confirmed two days later, after Bent had a scan on his ankle that revealed he had ruptured ligaments. He was out for three months which effectively ended his season with Villa and most likely his chance to play at UEFA Euro 2012. Bent had recovered from his injury by mid-May and was in contention for Villa's final match of 2011–12 against Norwich City but was ultimately left out. This also gave him the possibility of making new England manager Roy Hodgson's Euro 2012 England squad. Bent vowed to prove his fitness to Hodgson, in the hope he would be selected to play in the tournament. Bent once again finished as Villa's top scorer with 10 goals in 25 appearances and vowed to stay on at the club.

On 28 August, Bent scored his first goal of 2012–13 in a 3–0 victory over League One team Tranmere Rovers in the second round of the League Cup, his first goal for Villa since February 2012. Bent lost the Villa captaincy to Ron Vlaar, after the Dutchman was appointed captain for the 2–0 victory against Swansea City on 15 September 2012 and thereafter. He scored his first league goal of the season on 22 September, in a 4–1 defeat away to Southampton. Bent then lost his starting place for the next league match against West Bromwich Albion, after the performances of Gabriel Agbonlahor and Christian Benteke during the midweek League Cup victory over Manchester City saw the pair start up front. However, after coming on for Benteke as a 68th-minute substitute, Bent scored the equaliser against West Brom in a 1–1 draw.

Bent joined Villa's Premier League rivals Fulham on a season-long loan on 16 August 2013. He scored his first goal for Fulham on 24 August 2013 on his debut, 18 minutes after replacing Damien Duff in a 3–1 defeat at home to London rivals Arsenal. On 24 September, only three minutes after coming on for Adel Taarabt, he scored the winner in a 2–1 home win over Everton in the third round of the League Cup. Again as a late substitute, this time for Dimitar Berbatov, he scored the only goal in Fulham's home league win over Stoke City on 5 October, taking control of Pajtim Kasami's shot and cutting past Robert Huth.

Despite scoring in the first match and replay against Norwich City in the third round of the FA Cup, Bent went 13 league matches without scoring before an added-time equaliser at Old Trafford to gain a 2–2 draw against Manchester United on 9 February after replacing Muamer Tanković at half-time. He finished his loan with 6 goals in 30 matches, and Fulham were relegated into the Championship.

On 26 November 2014, Bent joined Brighton & Hove Albion on a one-month loan. Three days later, he scored on his debut for the Championship club, opening a 2–1 defeat to his former employers Fulham at Falmer Stadium.

=== Derby County and retirement ===
After two goals in five appearances for Brighton, Bent was loaned to another Championship club, Derby County, on 2 January 2015. He was signed by his former international manager Steve McClaren on a deal lasting until the end of the season. With his fourth goal in five matches, he equalised in a 2–2 draw away to then league leaders AFC Bournemouth on 10 February 2015. Bent scored 12 goals from 17 appearances as Derby finished in eighth place in the Championship table, missing out on a play-off place by one point. He was released by Aston Villa on 8 June 2015, ahead of a permanent transfer to Derby on a two-year contract, with a one-year option.

On 26 January 2018, Bent joined fellow Championship side Burton Albion on loan for the remainder of the 2017–18 season. He was yet to make a first team appearance for Derby during the 2017–18 season after suffering a pre-season hamstring injury. He scored his first goal for Burton in a 3–1 loss away to Cardiff City on 30 March 2018. On 21 April 2018 Bent scored a goal against his former club Sunderland as Burton came from a goal down to win 2–1 and condemn the former club to their second relegation in as many seasons. He was released by Derby at the end of the 2017–18 season.

Bent announced his retirement from playing on 25 July 2019.

== International career ==
=== Youth ===
Bent made his debut for the England national under-15 team on 15 October 1999 as an 85th-minute substitute in a 2–1 win over Northern Ireland in the team's opening match at the 1999 Victory Shield. He started the following match on 28 October 1999, scoring in the third minute as England beat Wales 3–1. He played in all three matches, scoring once, as England won the tournament, topping the table with nine points. Bent represented the under-15s at the 2000 Ballymena Tournament, starting in their first match on 24 April, a 1–0 defeat to Switzerland. The following day, he scored England's four goals in their 4–0 win over Finland. Bent scored in England's 3–2 win over Belgium on 29 April 2000 in the seventh-place match. He finished his under-15 career with seven goals in eight appearances from 1999 to 2000.

Bent made his under-16 debut on 31 July in their opening match at the 2000 Nordic Cup, coming on as a substitute as England beat Finland 2–1. He scored in the 52nd minute of England's 3–0 win over the Faroe Islands on 3 August 2000, before starting in the final the following day, in which England were beaten 3–0 by Sweden. Bent represented England at the 2001 Algarve Tournament, appearing as a substitute in the team's three matches as they were eliminated at the group stage. He made 11 appearances and scored 3 goals for the under-16s from 2000 to 2001.

His debut for the under-19 team came on 14 February 2002 when starting against Germany in a friendly, scoring two goals in a 3–1 victory. Bent scored in the 33rd minute of a 1–1 draw with Lithuania on 17 April 2002 in the 2002 UEFA European Under-19 Championship qualification intermediary round first leg, with a 2–1 win in the second leg securing England's qualification for the tournament. He finished his time with the under-19s with three appearances, scoring three goals, in 2002.

Bent's first appearance for the under-21 team came on 11 February 2003 as a 71st-minute substitute against Italy in a friendly, which England lost 1–0. His first goal came on his second appearance on 2 June 2003, with an 87th-minute winner in a 3–2 win over Serbia and Montenegro in a friendly. He played in both leg's of England's 3–2 aggregate defeat to France in the 2006 UEFA European Under-21 Championship qualification play-offs, and scored in the 55th minute of the 2–1 defeat on 15 November 2005 in the second leg. This was his last appearance for the under-21s, finishing his time with them with 14 appearances and 9 goals.

=== Senior ===
Bent received his first call up to the senior England team for the friendly against Denmark on 17 August 2005, but did not play in the match. His England debut eventually came on 1 March 2006, when he started against Uruguay at Anfield in a pre-2006 FIFA World Cup friendly match. He was not included in England's World Cup squad when it was announced in May 2006.

Despite having played for the senior team, Bent was recalled to the under-21 squad for their October 2006 qualification play-offs against Germany. Later that month, he was recalled to the senior squad due to an injury to Andrew Johnson shortly after the squad's announcement. He was called to the England squad for a UEFA Euro 2008 qualifier against Croatia in November 2007. He came on as an 80th-minute substitute as England lost 3–2 and failed to qualify for the tournament. He was called up to the team for a 2010 FIFA World Cup qualifier against Ukraine in March 2009 following an injury to striker Carlton Cole. He made his second start for England in a 1–0 friendly defeat to Brazil on 14 November 2009. Bent was named in England's preliminary 30-man squad for the 2010 World Cup on 11 May 2010, although he was eventually omitted from the final 23-man squad on 1 June.

Bent scored his first international goal in England's 3–1 away win over Switzerland after appearing as a substitute for Jermain Defoe in a Euro 2012 qualifier on 7 September 2010. Then-England manager Fabio Capello stated he had been impressed with the improvement in Bent's all-round game since his World Cup omission and selected him in the starting 11 for England's friendly with Denmark, where he scored a tap-in from a Theo Walcott cross. Bent retained his place for England's Euro 2012 qualifier with Wales to make his first competitive international start on 26 March 2011. In scoring England's second goal, he took his tally to three goals in his last three matches. Bent recovered from injury in time but was left out of the final 23-man squad for Euro 2012 as then-England manager Roy Hodgson felt Bent would not be fit enough to appear at the tournament.

== Personal life ==
Bent was born in Tooting, Greater London, to a family of Jamaican descent, and grew up in Thornton Heath. His father, Mervyn Bent, was a player in the youth systems of Wimbledon and Brentford. At the age of 10, he moved to Huntingdon, Cambridgeshire, where he attended Hinchingbrooke School and played in the Godmanchester Rovers youth system. While at school, Bent competed in the long jump for England Schools. His uncle Junior Bent and cousin Cory Bent were also professional footballers.

Bent is a supporter of Arsenal and used to have a season ticket at Highbury.

He was handed a formal caution by police in June 2004 after he was alleged to have shot a 12-year-old with a pellet gun.

In 2019, Bent appeared on BBC's Celebrity Mastermind and scored a total of three points over two rounds; something he describes as "the worst experience of my life."

== Career statistics ==
=== Club ===
Appearances and goals by club, season and competition
| Club | Season | League | | | FA Cup | | League Cup | | Europe | | Other | | Total | |
| Club | Season | Division | Apps | Goals | Apps | Goals | Apps | Goals | Apps | Goals | Apps | Goals | Apps | Goals |
|---|---|---|---|---|---|---|---|---|---|---|---|---|---|---|
| Ipswich Town | 2001–02 | Premier League | 5 | 1 | 0 | 0 | 1 | 1 | 1 (Note: Appearance(s) in UEFA Cup) | 0 | — | | 7 | 2 |
| Ipswich Town | 2002–03 | First Division | 35 | 12 | 2 | 3 | 3 | 2 | 3 | 1 | — | | 43 | 18 |
| Ipswich Town | 2003–04 | First Division | 37 | 15 | 1 | 0 | 1 | 0 | — | | 2 (Note: Appearances in First Division play-offs) | 1 | 41 | 16 |
| Ipswich Town | 2004–05 | Championship | 45 | 20 | 1 | 0 | 2 | 0 | — | | 2 (Note: Appearances in Championship play-offs) | 0 | 50 | 20 |
| Ipswich Town | Total | | 122 | 48 | 4 | 3 | 7 | 3 | 4 | 1 | 4 | 1 | 141 | 56 |
| Charlton Athletic | 2005–06 | Premier League | 36 | 18 | 5 | 2 | 3 | 2 | — | | — | | 44 | 22 |
| Charlton Athletic | 2006–07 | Premier League | 32 | 13 | 0 | 0 | 3 | 2 | — | | — | | 35 | 15 |
| Charlton Athletic | Total | | 68 | 31 | 5 | 2 | 6 | 4 | — | | — | | 79 | 37 |
| Tottenham Hotspur | 2007–08 | Premier League | 27 | 6 | 0 | 0 | 1 | 0 | 8 | 2 | — | | 36 | 8 |
| Tottenham Hotspur | 2008–09 | Premier League | 33 | 12 | 1 | 0 | 3 | 1 | 6 | 4 | — | | 43 | 17 |
| Tottenham Hotspur | Total | | 60 | 18 | 1 | 0 | 4 | 1 | 14 | 6 | — | | 79 | 25 |
| Sunderland | 2009–10 | Premier League | 38 | 24 | 2 | 1 | 0 | 0 | — | | — | | 40 | 25 |
| Sunderland | 2010–11 | Premier League | 20 | 8 | 1 | 1 | 2 | 2 | — | | — | | 23 | 11 |
| Sunderland | Total | | 58 | 32 | 3 | 2 | 2 | 2 | — | | — | | 63 | 36 |
| Aston Villa | 2010–11 | Premier League | 16 | 9 | — | | — | | — | | — | | 16 | 9 |
| Aston Villa | 2011–12 | Premier League | 22 | 9 | 2 | 1 | 1 | 0 | — | | — | | 25 | 10 |
| Aston Villa | 2012–13 | Premier League | 16 | 3 | 2 | 2 | 5 | 1 | — | | — | | 23 | 6 |
| Aston Villa | 2014–15 | Premier League | 7 | 0 | — | | 1 | 0 | — | | — | | 8 | 0 |
| Aston Villa | Total | | 61 | 21 | 4 | 3 | 7 | 1 | — | | — | | 72 | 25 |
| Fulham (loan) | 2013–14 | Premier League | 24 | 3 | 3 | 2 | 3 | 1 | — | | — | | 30 | 6 |
| Brighton & Hove Albion (loan) | 2014–15 | Championship | 5 | 2 | — | | — | | — | | — | | 5 | 2 |
| Derby County (loan) | 2014–15 | Championship | 15 | 10 | 2 | 2 | — | | — | | — | | 17 | 12 |
| Derby County | 2015–16 | Championship | 21 | 2 | 1 | 1 | 1 | 0 | — | | 2 | 0 | 25 | 3 |
| Derby County | 2016–17 | Championship | 37 | 10 | 2 | 2 | 3 | 1 | — | | — | | 42 | 13 |
| Derby County | 2017–18 | Championship | 0 | 0 | 0 | 0 | 0 | 0 | — | | 0 | 0 | 0 | 0 |
| Derby County | Total | | 73 | 22 | 5 | 5 | 4 | 1 | — | | 2 | 0 | 84 | 28 |
| Burton Albion (loan) | 2017–18 | Championship | 15 | 2 | — | | — | | — | | — | | 15 | 2 |
| Career total | | | 486 | 179 | 25 | 17 | 33 | 13 | 18 | 7 | 6 | 1 | 568 | 217 |

=== International ===
Appearances and goals by national team and year
| National team | Year | Apps | Goals |
|---|---|---|---|
| England | 2006 | 2 | 0 |
| England | 2007 | 1 | 0 |
| England | 2008 | 1 | 0 |
| England | 2009 | 1 | 0 |
| England | 2010 | 2 | 1 |
| England | 2011 | 6 | 3 |
| Total | | 13 | 4 |

England score listed first, score column indicates score after each Bent goal.

List of international goals scored by Darren Bent
| No. | Date | Venue | Cap | Opponent | Score | Result | Competition | Ref. |
|---|---|---|---|---|---|---|---|---|
| 1 | 7 September 2010 | St. Jakob-Park, Basel, Switzerland | 7 | Switzerland | 3–1 | 3–1 | UEFA Euro 2012 qualification | |
| 2 | 9 February 2011 | Parken Stadium, Copenhagen, Denmark | 8 | Denmark | 1–1 | 2–1 | Friendly | |
| 3 | 26 March 2011 | Millennium Stadium, Cardiff, Wales | 9 | Wales | 2–0 | 2–0 | UEFA Euro 2012 qualification | |
| 4 | 7 October 2011 | Podgorica City Stadium, Podgorica, Montenegro | 11 | Montenegro | 2–0 | 2–2 | UEFA Euro 2012 qualification | |

== Honours ==
Tottenham Hotspur

- Football League Cup: 2007–08; runner-up: 2008–09

England U15

- Victory Shield: 1999

England U16

- Nordic Cup runner-up: 2000

Individual

- Ipswich Town Young Player of the Year: 2002–03
- Premier League Player of the Month: August 2005
- Charlton Athletic Player of the Year: 2005–06
- Sunderland Player of the Year: 2009–10
- Ipswich Town Hall of Fame: Inducted 2026
