= Márton Fülöp =

Hungarian footballer (1983–2015)

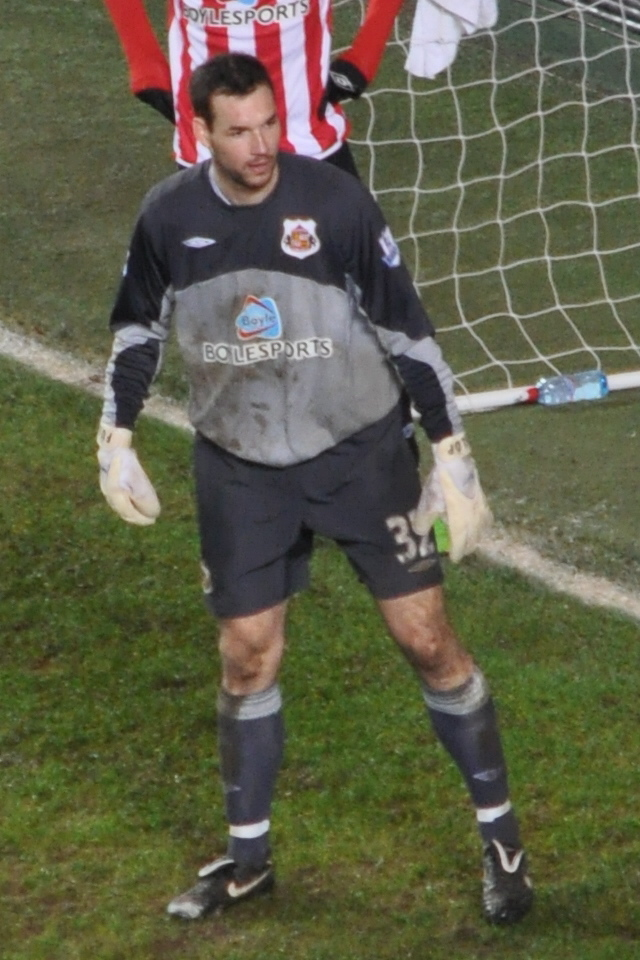
- Fülöp playing for Sunderland in 2010

Personal information
- Full name: Márton Fülöp
- Date of birth: 3 May 1983
- Place of birth: Budapest, Hungary
- Date of death: 12 November 2015 (aged 32)
- Place of death: Budapest, Hungary
- Height: 6 ft 6 in (1.98 m)
- Position: Goalkeeper

Senior career*
Years	Team	Apps	(Gls)
2001–2002	MTK Budapest	0	(0)
2002–2003	BKV Előre SC	16	(0)
2003–2004	Bodajk	27	(0)
2004–2007	Tottenham Hotspur	0	(0)
2005	→ Chesterfield (loan)	7	(0)
2005–2006	→ Coventry City (loan)	31	(0)
2006–2007	→ Sunderland (loan)	1	(0)
2007–2010	Sunderland	44	(0)
2007	→ Leicester City (loan)	24	(0)
2008	→ Stoke City (loan)	0	(0)
2010	→ Manchester City (loan)	3	(0)
2010–2011	Ipswich Town	35	(0)
2011–2012	West Bromwich Albion	1	(0)
2012–2013	Asteras Tripolis	28	(0)
Total		217	(0)

International career
2004–2005	Hungary U21	11	(0)
2005–2011	Hungary	24	(0)
- * Club domestic league appearances and goals

Márton Fülöp (Hungarian pronunciation: [ˈmaːrton ˈfyløp]; 3 May 1983 – 12 November 2015) was a Hungarian professional footballer who played as a goalkeeper.

After playing in Hungary for MTK Budapest, BKV Előre SC and BFC Siófok, he signed for English club Tottenham Hotspur, who loaned him to Chesterfield and Coventry, then to Sunderland with whom he permanently signed in 2007. Further loans to Leicester City, Stoke City and Manchester City ended with a transfer to Ipswich Town. He ended his career with spells at West Bromwich Albion and Greece's Asteras Tripolis.

Fülöp also represented his country at under-21 and full international level, earning 24 senior caps from his debut in 2005. He died in 2015 of cancer.

== Club career ==
=== Career in Hungary ===
Márton Fülöp was born on 3 May 1983 in Budapest and was a graduate of the local club MTK Budapest FC. He was a squad member in the 2001/2002 season without playing a single league match. Between 2002 and 2004, Fülöp played on loan for two lower Hungarian division BKV Előre SC and BFC Siófok.

=== Tottenham Hotspur ===
Fülöp signed for Tottenham Hotspur in the summer of 2004 from MTK Hungária FC after a successful trial with the club, and said: "The trial went well and I'm delighted the move has gone through, this is a big step for me." On 11 March 2005, due to an injury to Carl Muggleton, he joined League One club Chesterfield on a month's loan, making his English debut in a 2–1 home win over Huddersfield Town the following day. This loan was extended until the end of the season. He played in seven games before being recalled to Spurs as cover for Radek Černý due to an injury to Paul Robinson.

He joined Coventry City on a three-month loan on 28 October 2005, and in the 2005–06 season he was the first-choice for the Sky Blues in the Championship, with 31 appearances. In early 2006 he stated that he did not intend to stay at Tottenham as he admitted it would be hard to get past number one Robinson, and expressed a desire to join Coventry in a permanent move.

=== Sunderland ===
However, in November 2006, he signed for another Championship team, Sunderland, on a month's loan, with a view to a permanent transfer once the transfer window opened in January. Fülöp made his debut for Sunderland on 9 December in the 2–1 victory over Luton Town. Afterwards, Fülöp expressed his desire to join Sunderland permanently. His deal at Sunderland was made permanent for £900,000 on 2 January 2007, in a deal which involved fellow goalkeeper Ben Alnwick going to Tottenham Hotspur.

Fülöp signed a year-long loan deal with Leicester City of the Championship on 16 August 2007, making his debut against Crystal Palace two days later, which ended in a 2–2 draw. On 1 September, the goalkeeper made a string of superb saves against Plymouth Argyle to ensure Leicester a point at Home Park. This would be the first of a number of fine performances from Fülöp. On 26 September, he made saves which contributed in the team's shock victory over top-flight Aston Villa in the League Cup. He was twice named in the Championship Team of the Week, on 1 and 22 October.

Fülöp made another fine performance against Chelsea in another League Cup match on 31 October, twice denying Claudio Pizarro and pushing an effort from Scott Sinclair onto the post, but could not prevent his side from losing 4–3 at Stamford Bridge. His form during that season prompted the club to bid for him on a permanent basis in the January transfer window. Fülöp told Sky Sports on 21 December that he was interested in a permanent deal with Leicester, and the club made an offer for him eight days later, together with Graham Kavanagh. He played his last match for Leicester in a 1–1 draw against Charlton Athletic at the Walkers Stadium on 29 December 2007.

Fülöp was recalled to Sunderland on 31 December. On 4 January 2008, Leicester manager Ian Holloway accused Sunderland counterpart Roy Keane of being greedy after his initial bid to sign Fülöp was rejected. A total of £1 million was offered, however Keane demanded £3 million. Holloway refused to pay more than £1 million, ending any hopes of keeping Fülöp. Fülöp revealed on 25 January that he was unhappy to be recalled by Keane and that he actually wanted to stay at Leicester.

Fülöp was loaned to Stoke City on 22 February 2008, but was recalled by Sunderland just four days later as back up cover to Craig Gordon following Darren Ward's injury, making one appearance in the final Premier League game at home to Arsenal. Stoke had a bid of £1.7 million for him rejected by Sunderland in June, but the clubs later agreed a fee in July of £3m. However, the deal collapsed after Stoke signed Thomas Sørensen on a free transfer instead, after the deal was stalled because of payments to Fülöp's agent. Due to Gordon's injury, Fülöp had taken over the goalkeeping position, and was in goal for the second Tyne–Wear derby of the season on 1 February 2009.

On 27 April 2010, Fülöp joined Manchester City on an emergency loan until the end of the 2009–10 season. City's first-team goalkeeper Shay Given suffered a dislocated shoulder against Arsenal, back-up goalkeepers Stuart Taylor and David González were both sidelined with injury, and Joe Hart on loan at Birmingham City, leaving City with only the inexperienced Gunnar Nielsen available to play. His debut came at home against Aston Villa on 1 May in a 3–1 victory.

=== Ipswich Town ===
On 2 August 2010, it was reported that Ipswich Town had agreed a deal to sign Fülöp from Sunderland, with a medical the last remaining phase in the transfer left to be completed and joining under manager Roy Keane (who signed him for Sunderland in 2007). He passed his medical and signed a two-year contract on 5 August. Following his move to Ipswich Town, Fülöp revealed he choose to join Ipswich in order to play first-team football. Fülöp made his debut for Ipswich Town in a 3–1 win over Middlesbrough.

=== West Bromwich Albion ===
After staying for one season with Ipswich Town, Fülöp signed a one-year contract with West Bromwich Albion on 6 August 2011, moving on a free transfer. He was a replacement for Boaz Myhill, who left to join Birmingham City on loan, and Scott Carson, who joined Bursaspor. Fülöp was the second-choice goalkeeper for West Brom behind Ben Foster, who had joined on loan from Birmingham City. Despite this, Fülöp made his debut for West Brom in a League Cup 4–1 victory against AFC Bournemouth. His next appearance for West Brom was again in the League Cup against Everton, Everton won the match 2–1 after their captain Phil Neville scored an extra-time winner.

Fülöp played his only league game with West Brom against Arsenal on the last day of the 2011–12 season, in Roy Hodgson's last game in charge before becoming manager of the England national team. Arsenal won 3–2 with all three of their goals being widely considered preventable by Fülöp, who was released from his contract days later.

=== Asteras Tripolis ===
After being released by West Brom, Fülöp moved to Greece, joining Asteras Tripolis on a two-year deal.

== International career ==
Fülöp made his full international debut for the Hungarian national team on 31 May 2005, coming on at half-time for Gábor Király against France in a friendly at the Stade Municipal Saint-Symphorien in Metz. He did not concede a goal, but Hungary lost 2–1.

Fülöp earned his fifth and sixth cap against Bosnia and Turkey during the Euro 2008 qualifying. He managed two clean sheets against Malta and Poland on 13 and 17 October, but conceded three goals against Moldova on 17 November. Fülöp conceded two more goals in Hungary's last match of the Euro 2008 qualifying, losing 2–1 to Greece. Hungary finished second last in Group C with 12 points.

== Illness and death ==
In 2013, Fülöp announced that he was taking a break from football after having a malignant tumour removed from his arm. In 2014, he announced that he was preparing for a return to the sport.

Fülöp died of cancer on 12 November 2015, aged 32. On the day of his death, Hungarian internationals, wearing black armbands, won 1–0 away to the favoured Norway team in the first leg of their UEFA Euro 2016 qualifying play-off game. Hungarian goalkeeper Gábor Király, who celebrated his 100th international appearance and was rated as the best player of the match, said afterwards: "We simply could not afford to concede any goals on this match, out of respect to him". When with only two minutes remaining from the game, Norway's Pål André Helland headed a rebounding ball against the crossbar with an open goal gaping, Hungarian commentator István Hajdú B. remarked: "This was probably tipped to the bar by Márton Fülöp...this was a helping hand from the sky". Three days later, the rematch in Budapest started with a minute's silence in the memory of him (as well as former Golden Team member Pál Várhidi and the victims of the Paris terror attacks). Hungary beat Norway 2–1, and qualified for the Euros after 44 years, reaching a major international competition for the first time since the 1986 World Cup. Several players commemorated Fülöp in their post match interviews, including goalscorer Tamás Priskin who paid tribute by dedicating his goal to his late teammate.

The day after his death, Sunderland flew their flags at the Stadium of Light and their training ground at half-staff as a mark of respect.

On 14 June 2016, before Hungary's first Euro 2016 match, the three goalkeepers of the Hungarian squad, Király, Dénes Dibusz and Péter Gulácsi, were noticed while being photographed together during the pre-game field walk, holding a pair of keeper gloves labelled with Fülöp's name. Király later revealed that he received the gloves from Fülöp's father, and he made a promise to bring them with him during the entire tournament.

On 3 May 2023, which would have been Fülöp's 40th birthday, Zalaegerszegi TE won the Hungarian Cup. After the game Hungarian international goalkeeper Patrik Demjén dedicated the victory to Fülöp's memory.

== Career statistics ==
=== Club ===
Appearances and goals by club, season and competition
Club	Season	League			FA Cup		League Cup		Other		Total	
Club	Season	Division	Apps	Goals	Apps	Goals	Apps	Goals	Apps	Goals	Apps	Goals
MTK Budapest	2001–02	Nemzeti Bajnokság I	0	0	0	0	0	0	—		0	0
BKV Előre SC	2002–03	Nemzeti Bajnokság II	16	0	0	0	0	0	—		16	0
Bodajk	2003–04	Nemzeti Bajnokság I	27	0	0	0	0	0	—		27	0
Tottenham Hotspur	2004–05	Premier League	0	0	0	0	0	0	0	0	0	0
Tottenham Hotspur	2005–06	Premier League	0	0	0	0	0	0	0	0	0	0
Tottenham Hotspur	2006–07	Premier League	0	0	0	0	0	0	0	0	0	0
Tottenham Hotspur	Total		0	0	0	0	0	0	0	0	0	0
Chesterfield (loan)	2004–05	League One	7	0	0	0	0	0	0	0	7	0
Coventry City (loan)	2005–06	Championship	31	0	2	0	0	0	—		33	0
Sunderland	2006–07	Championship	5	0	0	0	0	0	—		5	0
Sunderland	2007–08	Premier League	1	0	0	0	0	0	—		1	0
Sunderland	2008–09	Premier League	26	0	2	0	2	0	—		30	0
Sunderland	2009–10	Premier League	13	0	1	0	0	0	—		14	0
Sunderland	Total		45	0	3	0	2	0	—		50	0
Leicester City (loan)	2007–08	Championship	24	0	3	0	0	0	—		27	0
Stoke City (loan)	2007–08	Championship	0	0	0	0	0	0	—		0	0
Manchester City (loan)	2009–10	Premier League	3	0	0	0	0	0	—		3	0
Ipswich Town	2010–11	Championship	35	0	1	0	2	0	—		38	0
West Bromwich Albion	2011–12	Premier League	1	0	0	0	2	0	—		3	0
Asteras Tripolis	2012–13	Super League Greece	28	0	0	0	0	0	—		28	0
Career total			217	0	9	0	6	0	0	0	232	0

=== International ===
National team	Year	Apps	Goals
Hungary	2005	1	0
Hungary	2006	1	0
Hungary	2007	9	0
Hungary	2008	6	0
Hungary	2009	3	0
Hungary	2010	2	0
Hungary	2011	2	0
Total		24	0
