= Kenwyne Jones =

Trinidadian football player and manager (born 1984)

Kenwyne Jones CM
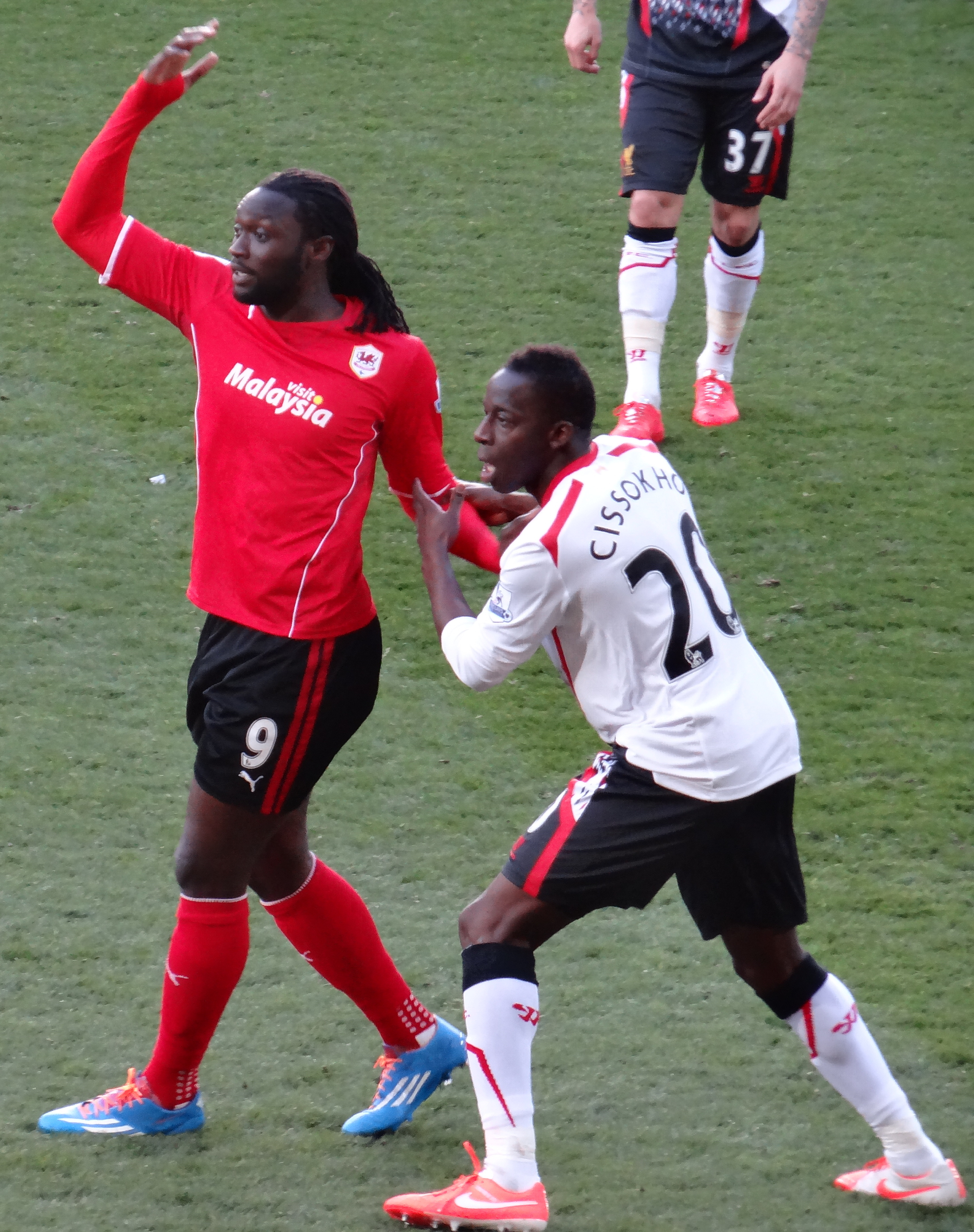
- Jones (left) tussling with Liverpool's Aly Cissokho in 2014

Personal information
- Full name: Kenwyne Joel Jones
- Date of birth: 5 October 1984 (age 42)
- Place of birth: Point Fortin, Trinidad and Tobago
- Height: 1.88 m (6 ft 2 in)
- Position: Forward

Senior career*
Years	Team	Apps	(Gls)
2002	Joe Public	11	(9)
2002–2004	W Connection	31	(30)
2004–2007	Southampton	71	(19)
2004–2005	→ Sheffield Wednesday (loan)	7	(7)
2005	→ Stoke City (loan)	13	(3)
2007–2010	Sunderland	94	(26)
2010–2014	Stoke City	88	(13)
2014–2016	Cardiff City	64	(17)
2015	→ AFC Bournemouth (loan)	6	(1)
2016	→ Al Jazira (loan)	11	(3)
2016–2017	Atlanta United	17	(2)
2016	→ Central (loan)	5	(4)
Total		418	(134)

International career
2003–2017	Trinidad and Tobago	91	(23)

Managerial career
- 2021–2023: Trinidad and Tobago Women
- * Club domestic league appearances and goals

Kenwyne Joel Jones CM (born 5 October 1984) is a Trinidadian professional football manager and former player who played as a forward. He was most recently manager of the Trinidad and Tobago women's national team.

He began his football career with Joe Public in his native Trinidad and Tobago. He moved to W Connection in 2002. In 2004, he joined Southampton, where he was converted to a striker. He was later loaned to Sheffield Wednesday and Stoke City during the 2004–05 season.

In 2007, he joined Sunderland for £6 million where he spent three seasons before he signed for Stoke City in August 2010. In his first season at Stoke, Jones scored 12 goals and played in the 2011 FA Cup final. Following the arrival of Peter Crouch in August 2011, Jones struggled to hold down a regular place in the side, and scored just four more league goals in the next three seasons. In January 2014 he joined Cardiff City in a player-exchange with Peter Odemwingie. While with Cardiff he spent time out on loan at AFC Bournemouth and Al Jazira before moving to Atlanta United in the summer of 2016. Jones retired from football in November 2017.

Jones has been capped at under-18, under-20, under-23 olympic team and the Trinidad and Tobago national team.

== Club career ==
=== Early career ===
Jones was born in Point Fortin, Trinidad and Tobago, to Lydia and Pamphile. and he attended St. Anthony's College in Trinidad along with his future Sunderland teammate Carlos Edwards. His uncle, Philibert Jones, was also a footballer as a prolific forward for Strike Squad that came within a point of qualifying for the 1990 World Cup and was a similar player to Kenwyne both in style and celebration.

He had earlier had trials at Manchester United and Middlesbrough in 2002, and further trials at West Ham United and Rangers in 2004. Jones revealed in an interview with Simon Bird that he had to travel around Europe looking for a football club, or face a career in the Trinidad army. "It was hard because I'd just had my son and it was make it — or join the army. I had a family to support and at that time, it was either this is it... or I go into the services. I was ready for that life." Jones began his professional career with Joe Public in his native Trinidad and Tobago in 2002. He soon moved to W Connection where he played for two years.

=== Southampton ===
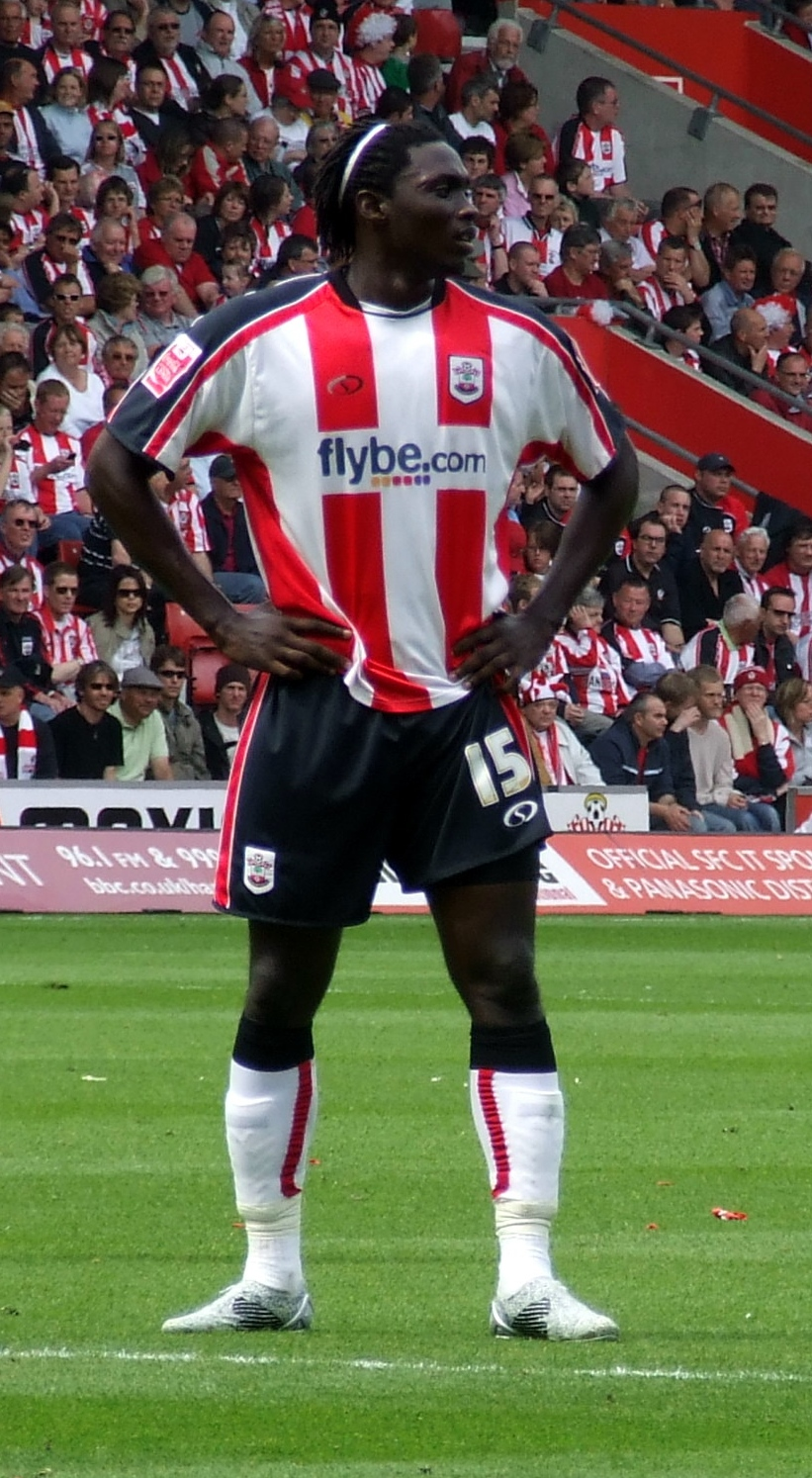
Jones playing for Southampton in 2007

In July 2004, Jones signed for Southampton from W Connection for a nominal fee after a trial. W Connection's Chairman David John Williams described Jones's move, saying: "When Kenwyne Jones was transferred to Southampton, I told you all that he is going to be the biggest thing in Trinidad and Tobago football since beside Dwight Yorke". In December 2004, while on loan to the Football League One club Sheffield Wednesday, he scored seven goals in seven games, and returned to Southampton in January 2005, where he played in games against Liverpool and local rivals Portsmouth. He joined Championship side Stoke City in February 2005 on loan where he played 13 times, scoring three goals.

Before the start of the 2006–07 season, Jones scored a hat trick against Anderlecht in Southampton's last pre-season game. Meanwhile, in the Football League Championship Jones scored two goals against Birmingham City on 29 November, which ended 4–3 to Southampton. On 26 December 2006, he received the first red card of his career for a push on Mark Hudson in the match against Crystal Palace. He scored another two goals against Southend United in a 4–1 win on the last day of the season to ensure a place in the play-offs for Southampton, following this, Jones was injured for the play-off semi-final defeat at Derby County but finished the season with 16 goals.

On 11 May 2007, Southampton manager George Burley stated that "Kenwyne is another Didier Drogba in the making — as far as physical attributes, his strength and power in the air are second to none". This followed news that Derby County wanted to sign Jones for around £5.5 million. Jones submitted a transfer request to Southampton on 24 August 2007 and went on "strike" until a move could be agreed, requesting not to be selected for the forthcoming league match against Stoke City.

=== Sunderland ===
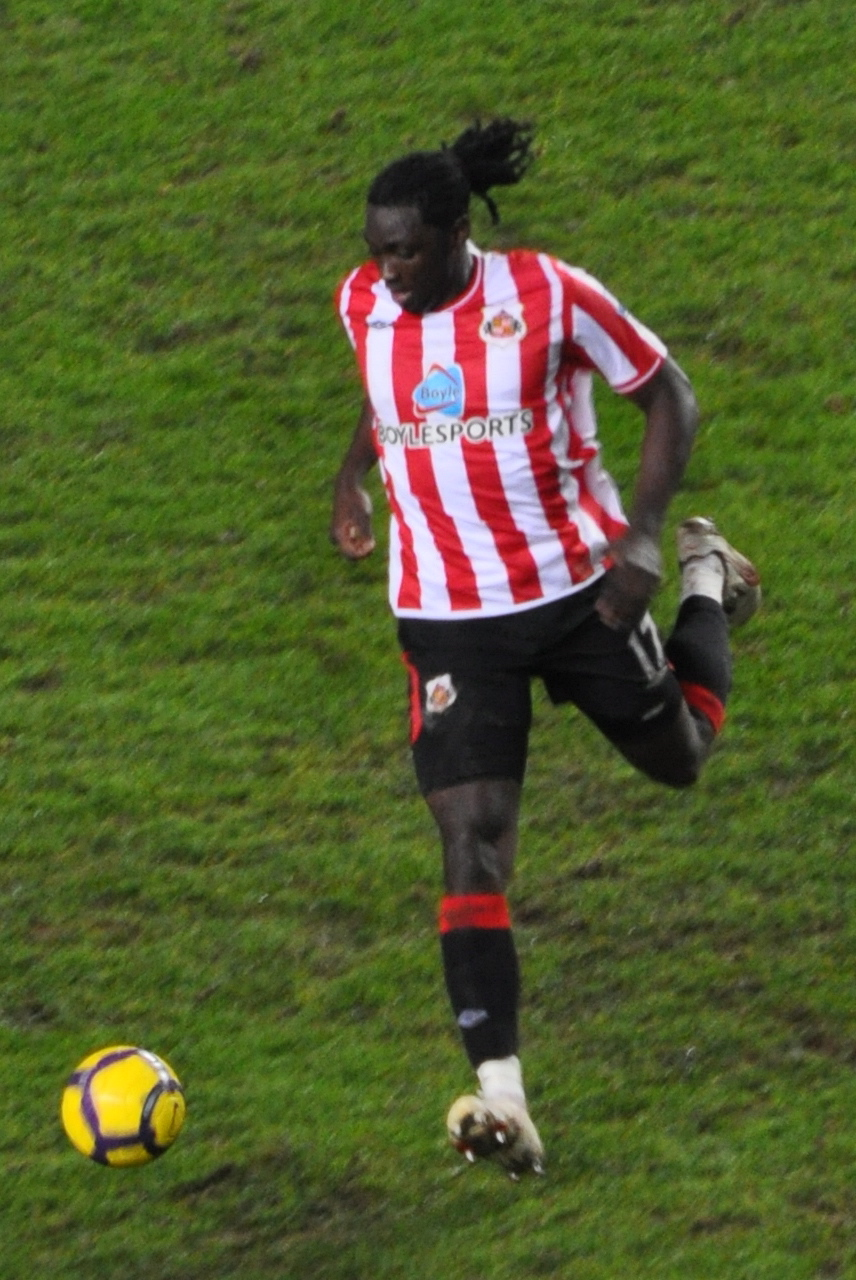
Jones in action for Sunderland against Chelsea in 2010

On 29 August 2007, it was confirmed that he had joined Sunderland in a deal valued at £6 million with fellow Trinidadian Stern John moving to Southampton. Jones made his debut for Sunderland on 1 September in a 1–0 defeat to Manchester United and scored his first goal for the club in a 2–1 home win over Reading on 15 September.

Jones was linked with a £12 million player move to Liverpool in November 2007, with Peter Crouch moving to Sunderland. Jones was again linked with high-profile clubs on 21 December 2007, including Chelsea and Liverpool, but Sunderland manager Roy Keane insisted that he would be going nowhere. Jones scored his fifth goal at the Stadium of Light, with a header from the near post from a corner kick, in Sunderland's 3–1 win over Bolton Wanderers on 29 December. Chelsea captain John Terry praised Jones, saying he was probably the "best in the air in the Premier League" after Chelsea had won the match 1–0 on 15 March 2008.

On 1 June 2008, Jones suffered a knee ligament injury in a collision with goalkeeper David James in the seventh minute of Trinidad & Tobago's 3–0 defeat against England. He made his first appearance of the 2008–09 season playing for 60 minutes in Sunderland reserve team's 2–0 victory against Wigan Athletic., followed by a return to Sunderland's first team in the Tyne–Wear derby on 25 October 2008 as a second-half substitute, when he helped Sunderland to secure a 2–1 victory over their local rivals. His first goal following his return came on 12 November in a 2–1 League Cup defeat against Blackburn Rovers. He continued his recovery from injury with a goal, again against Blackburn, on 15 November 2008 as Sunderland won 2–1.

Jones put an end to speculation linking him with a move to Tottenham Hotspur by signing a 4 1/2-year contract at the Stadium of Light on 27 January 2009. After a spell of six games without a goal, Jones scored against Manchester United in a 2–1 defeat. On 22 August Jones contributed to Sunderland's 2–1 victory over Blackburn Rovers by scoring two goals. Jones again contributed with two goals for Sunderland when they were at home to Wolves on 27 September, in a 5–2 win. One goal being the highlight of the game, curling the ball in from 22 yards out. Jones scored his fifth goal of the season with a header against Manchester United, outjumping Ben Foster to give Sunderland a 2–1 lead but in the dying moments of the match at Old Trafford, Patrice Evra's shot was deflected in for an own-goal by Anton Ferdinand to level it up and end the match as a 2–2 draw. Jones scored his sixth goal of the season with a close-range header against Manchester City, which City won 4–3. On 6 February, Jones scored his seventh goal of the season with another header against Wigan Athletic which ended up 1–1 at the Stadium of Light. Jones then scored again against Manchester City bringing his tally to eight, with a spectacular header at the Stadium of Light, which ended up 1–1. He also opened the scoring against Wolves on the final day of the season, netting after a strike deflected off Jody Craddock after 8 minutes, but Wolves would go on to win 2–1.

=== Stoke City ===
On 11 August 2010, Jones signed for Stoke City on a four-year deal for a club record fee of £8 million. Jones took a wage cut in order to join Stoke.

"We need goals in our team and we also need strong competition among our strikers if we are to continue improving at this level."Kenwyne will give us that. It's no secret that I am one of his biggest admirers, he did a smashing job for us when he was here on loan. "He was very young back then but I believe that he has the best years ahead of him as a top striker."

— Stoke Manager Tony Pulis on Kenwyne Jones.

Jones took over the number 9 shirt from the departing James Beattie who had joined Rangers. He made his second debut for City against Wolverhampton Wanderers on 14 August 2010, he made a bright start hitting the crossbar with his first shot. However, after falling awkwardly from a challenge from Jody Craddock on 14 minutes Jones was forced to come off. On 13 September, Jones scored his first goal for Stoke on his home debut against Aston Villa in a 2–1 win. Jones followed this by scoring against West Ham United, Fulham in the League Cup and Newcastle United. He scored the second goal on 13 November in a 2–0 win against Liverpool at the Britannia Stadium.

After six games without a goal and some criticism from supporters, manager Pulis revealed that Jones has had personal problems which have affected his performances. He ended this run with a goal against Everton on New Year's Day. However, he again went on a goal drought this time for three months before scoring against Tottenham Hotspur in April. He then went on a similar scoring run he had at the start of the season scoring against Bolton Wanderers at Wembley, Aston Villa, Wolverhampton Wanderers and then had an opportunity to become the first Stoke player to score in four consecutive Premier League matches against Blackpool but he missed an open goal. He made amends the following match scoring against Arsenal in a 3–1 win. Jones played in the 2011 FA Cup Final as Stoke lost 1–0 to Manchester City, he had Stoke's best chance in the match going through one on one with Joe Hart who saved Jones's effort. Jones ended the 2010–11 as joint top goalscorer with Jonathan Walters, both scored 12 goals. Jones said that he had a 'topsy-turvy' first season at Stoke.

Jones started the 2011–12 season well scoring against Norwich City and twice against FC Thun in the UEFA Europa League. With Stoke signing Peter Crouch at the end of August, Jones found himself out of favour and was restricted to cup and European matches. This has led to speculation that Jones could be leaving the club in the 2012 January transfer window but Pulis insists that he is still in his plans. He scored an historic goal for Stoke against Dynamo Kyiv to earn them a 1–1 draw which secured Stoke's qualification to the knock-out stage of the Europa League. In 2012–13 Jones remained behind Crouch in Pulis' starting line-up restricting him to cameo appearances off the bench. He regained his place in December 2012 after injury to Crouch and scored his first Premier League goal for sixteen months in a 1–1 draw with Everton. Jones continued his revival scoring against Liverpool on boxing day, and against his old club Southampton on 29 December. Jones lost his place once Crouch had returned to the side and he ended the season on a sour note as he was involved in a dressing room bust-up with Glenn Whelan. At the end of the season Tony Pulis was replaced by Mark Hughes and Jones was critical of the style of football played under Pulis.

Jones began the 2013–14 season by scoring his first professional hat-trick against Walsall in the League Cup on 28 August 2013. On 12 January 2014, Jones failed to arrive for Stoke's home game against Liverpool citing "personal problems", he was then fined two weeks wages by Hughes for his non-appearance.

=== Cardiff City ===
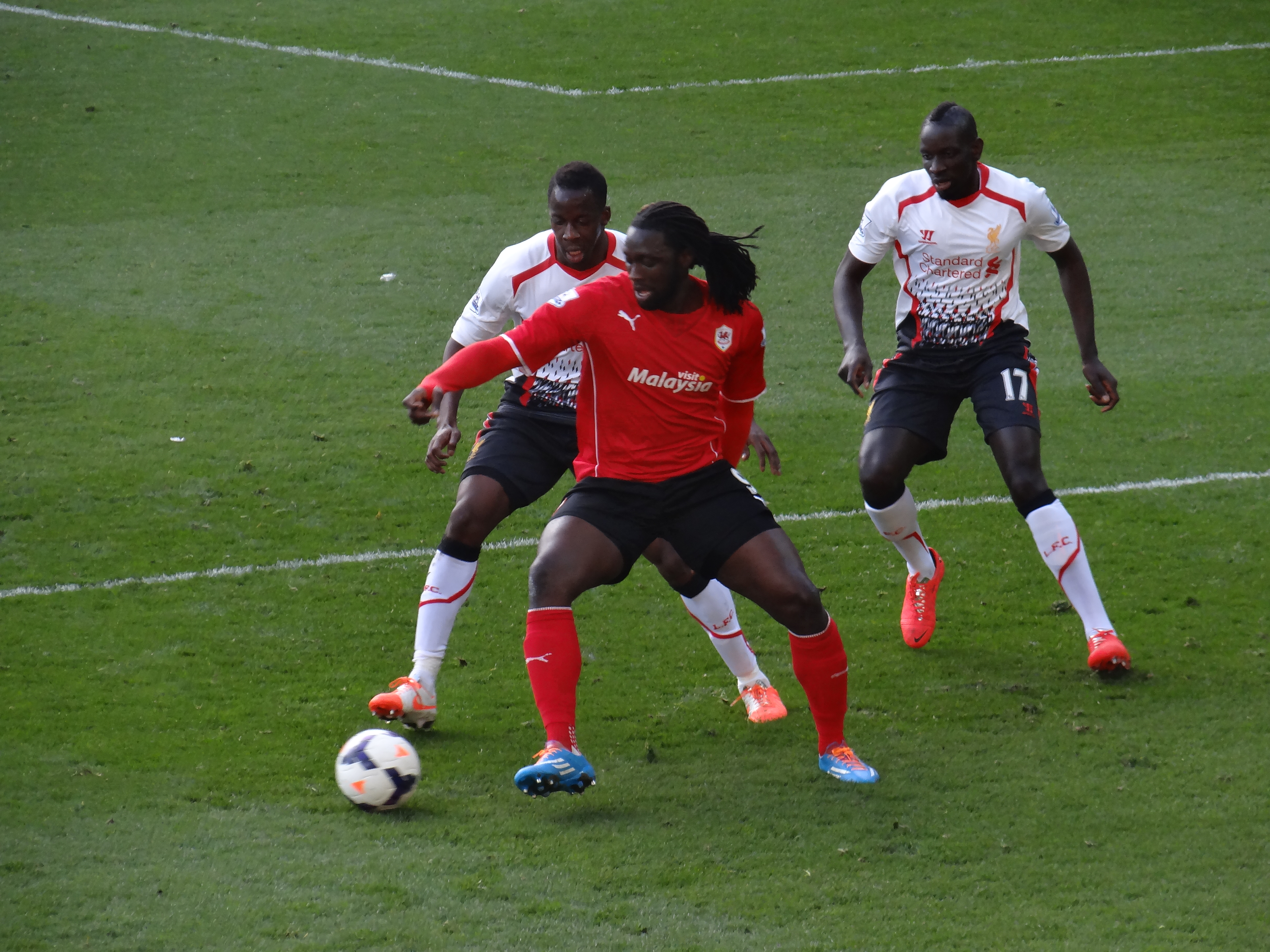
Jones being challenged by Aly Cissokho and Mamadou Sakho in 2014

On 28 January 2014, Jones joined Cardiff City in a player-exchange with Peter Odemwingie. Jones scored a debut goal for the Bluebirds on 1 February 2014, netting the winner in a 2–1 triumph against Norwich City, just one minute after Craig Bellamy had equalised. He played 11 times for Cardiff in the 2013–14 as they suffered relegation to the Championship.

Jones started the 2014–15 season strongly, scoring 9 in the first half of the season. However Jones tailed off in 2015, only managing to find the net twice. Due to Cardiff cutting costs, Jones was loaned to league leaders AFC Bournemouth for the remainder of the season, despite being Cardiff's top goal scorer. Jones scored on his debut for the Cherries on 3 April 2015 helping them to earn a 1–1 draw against Ipswich Town. Jones made six substitute appearances for the Cherries as they won the Championship title, gaining promotion to the Premier League.

Upon returning to Cardiff, Jones found himself on the bench following an injury picked up on international duty over the summer. Jones's return to the first XI, resulted in him finding himself on the score sheet in a 2–0 win over Wolverhampton Wanderers. Initial reports that his form had inclined manager, Russell Slade to open contract talks with him and the club in the final months of 2015 turned out to be untrue.

On 5 January 2016, Jones joined UAE-based club Al Jazira on loan until the end of the 2015–16 season.

=== Atlanta United ===
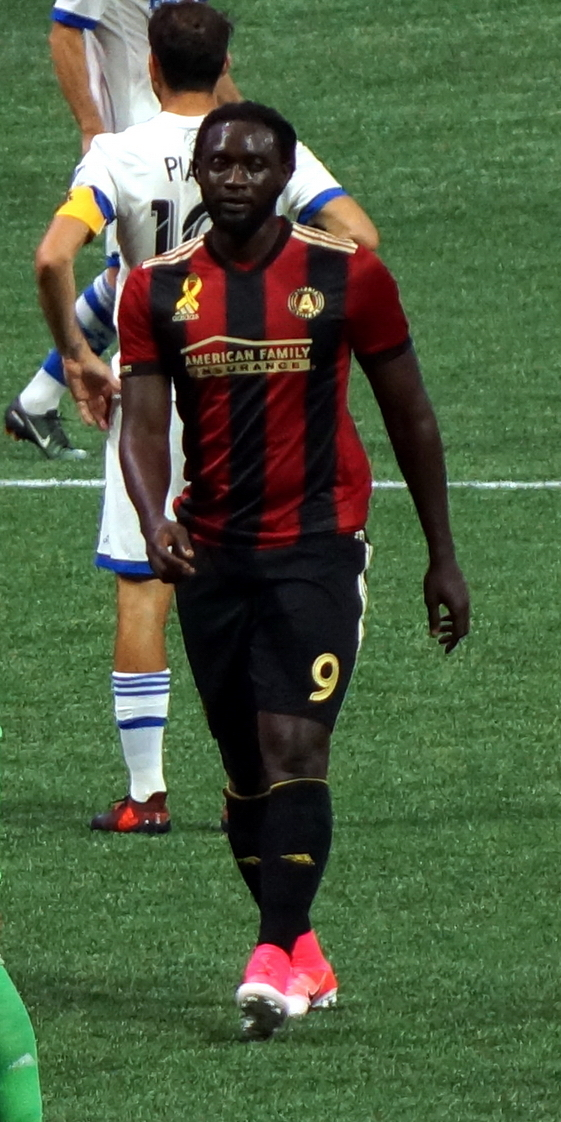
Kenwyne Jones at the end of the 24 September 2017 match for Atlanta United

On 15 July 2016, Jones signed for newly formed Major League Soccer side Atlanta United for their inaugural 2017 season. Jones was released by Atlanta at the end of the 2017 season. On 10 December 2017, his MLS rights were traded by Atlanta to Sporting Kansas City in exchange for a second-round selection in the 2018 MLS SuperDraft, midfielder Kévin Oliveira, and defender Tyler Pasher. Kansas City also received goalkeeper Alexander Tambakis and a fourth-round selection in the 2021 MLS SuperDraft as part of the trade.

== International career ==
He made his debut for the Trinidad and Tobago national team national team on 29 January 2003 in a match against Finland. Jones scored his first goal on 25 May 2005 in a 4–0 win against Bermuda. He was later selected by Trinidad and Tobago for their 2006 World Cup campaign, where he made his first appearance in the competition in a 2–0 defeat against England on 15 June 2006 at Frankenstadion, Nuremberg. Jones was named as Trinidad and Tobago Football Federation's Player of the Year for 2007. Jones said, "A lot of big names have won this before and I never really thought about something like this happening to me". Jones was named as captain of the Soca Warriors in August 2011 by manager Otto Pfister.

== Managerial career ==
In October 2021, Jones was appointed as the interim coach of the Trinidad and Tobago women's national team. The following month, he was named as the full-time coach.

== Personal life ==
As a member of the squad that competed at the 2006 FIFA World Cup in Germany, Jones was awarded the Chaconia Medal (Gold Class), the second highest state decoration of Trinidad and Tobago.

He earned his U.S. green card in February 2017. This status qualified him as a domestic player for MLS roster purposes.

== Career statistics ==
=== Club ===
Appearances and goals by club, season and competition
Club	Season	League			FA Cup		League Cup		Other		Total	
Club	Season	Division	Apps	Goals	Apps	Goals	Apps	Goals	Apps	Goals	Apps	Goals
Joe Public	2002	TT Pro League	11	9	—		—		—		11	9
W Connection	2003	TT Pro League	18	18	—		—		—		18	18
W Connection	2004	TT Pro League	13	12	—		—		—		13	12
W Connection	Total		31	30	—		—		—		31	30
Southampton	2004–05	Premier League	2	0	1	0	0	0	—		3	0
Southampton	2005–06	Championship	34	4	2	1	2	0	—		38	5
Southampton	2006–07	Championship	34	14	1	1	2	1	1 (Note: Appearances in Championship play-offs)	0	38	16
Southampton	2007–08	Championship	1	1	0	0	0	0	—		1	1
Southampton	Total		71	19	4	2	4	1	1	0	80	22
Sheffield Wednesday (loan)	2004–05	League One	7	7	0	0	0	0	—		7	7
Stoke City (loan)	2004–05	Championship	13	3	0	0	0	0	—		13	3
Sunderland	2007–08	Premier League	33	7	0	0	0	0	—		33	7
Sunderland	2008–09	Premier League	29	10	2	1	1	1	—		32	12
Sunderland	2009–10	Premier League	32	9	1	0	3	0	—		36	9
Sunderland	Total		94	26	3	1	4	1	0	0	101	28
Stoke City	2010–11	Premier League	34	9	6	1	2	2	—		42	12
Stoke City	2011–12	Premier League	21	1	2	0	2	1	10 (Note: Appearances in UEFA Europa League)	4	35	6
Stoke City	2012–13	Premier League	26	3	3	1	1	1	—		30	5
Stoke City	2013–14	Premier League	7	0	1	1	2	4	—		10	5
Stoke City	Total		88	13	12	3	7	8	10	4	117	28
Cardiff City	2013–14	Premier League	11	1	0	0	0	0	—		11	1
Cardiff City	2014–15	Championship	34	11	2	2	0	0	—		36	13
Cardiff City	2015–16	Championship	19	5	0	0	1	0	—		20	5
Cardiff City	Total		64	17	2	2	1	0	0	0	67	19
AFC Bournemouth (loan)	2014–15	Championship	6	1	0	0	0	0	—		6	1
Al Jazira (loan)	2015–16	UAE Pro-League	11	3	0	0	—		7 (Note: Appearances in AFC Champions League)	1	18	4
Atlanta United	2017	Major League Soccer	17	2	0	0	—		—		17	2
Central (loan)	2016–17	TT Pro League	5	4	0	0	—		2 (Note: Appearances in CONCACAF Champions League)	1	7	5
Career total			418	134	21	8	16	10	20	6	475	158

=== International ===
Appearances and goals by national team and year
National team	Year	Apps	Goals
Trinidad and Tobago	2003	2	0
Trinidad and Tobago	2004	11	0
Trinidad and Tobago	2005	12	1
Trinidad and Tobago	2006	8	2
Trinidad and Tobago	2007	0	0
Trinidad and Tobago	2008	3	1
Trinidad and Tobago	2009	10	0
Trinidad and Tobago	2010	0	0
Trinidad and Tobago	2011	4	3
Trinidad and Tobago	2012	0	0
Trinidad and Tobago	2013	11	6
Trinidad and Tobago	2014	8	5
Trinidad and Tobago	2015	9	4
Trinidad and Tobago	2016	4	1
Total		82	23

Scores and results list Trinidad and Tobago's goal tally first, score column indicates score after each Jones goal.

List of international goals scored by Kenwyne Jones
No.	Date	Venue	Opponent	Score	Result	Competition
1	25 May 2005	Hasely Crawford Stadium, Port of Spain, Trinidad and Tobago	Bermuda	1–0	4–0	Friendly
2	10 May 2006	Hasely Crawford Stadium, Port of Spain, Trinidad and Tobago	Peru	1–1	1–1	Friendly
3	11 October 2006	Hasely Crawford Stadium, Port of Spain, Trinidad and Tobago	Panama	1–0	2–1	Friendly
4	19 November 2008	Hasely Crawford Stadium, Port of Spain, Trinidad and Tobago	Cuba	1–0	3–0	2010 World Cup qualifier
5	2 September 2011	Hasely Crawford Stadium, Port of Spain, Trinidad and Tobago	Bermuda	1–0	1–0	2014 World Cup qualifier
6	11 November 2011	Providence Stadium, Providence, Guyana	Guyana	1–2	1–2	2014 World Cup qualifier
7	15 November 2011	Hasely Crawford Stadium, Port of Spain, Trinidad and Tobago	Guyana	1–0	2–0	2014 World Cup qualifier
8	9 July 2013	Red Bull Arena, Harrison, New Jersey, United States	El Salvador	2–2	2–2	2013 CONCACAF Gold Cup
9	15 July 2013	BBVA Compass Stadium, Houston, Texas, United States	Honduras	1–0	2–0	2013 CONCACAF Gold Cup
10	5 September 2013	King Fahd International Stadium, Riyadh, Saudi Arabia	United Arab Emirates	2–3	3–3	2013 OSN Cup
11	9 September 2013	King Fahd International Stadium, Riyadh, Saudi Arabia	Saudi Arabia	1–0	3–1	2013 OSN Cup
12	9 September 2013	King Fahd International Stadium, Riyadh, Saudi Arabia	Saudi Arabia	2–0	3–1	2013 OSN Cup
13	19 November 2013	Hasely Crawford Stadium, Port of Spain, Trinidad and Tobago	Jamaica	2–0	2–0	Friendly
14	8 October 2014	Ato Boldon Stadium, Couva, Trinidad and Tobago	Dominican Republic	4–0	6–1	2014 Caribbean Cup qualifier
15	8 October 2014	Ato Boldon Stadium, Couva, Trinidad and Tobago	Dominican Republic	5–0	6–1	2014 Caribbean Cup qualifier
16	10 October 2014	Ato Boldon Stadium, Couva, Trinidad and Tobago	Saint Lucia	2–0	2–0	2014 Caribbean Cup qualifier
17	11 November 2014	Montego Bay Sports Complex, Montego Bay, Jamaica	Curaçao	1–1	3–2	2014 Caribbean Cup
18	11 November 2014	Montego Bay Sports Complex, Montego Bay, Jamaica	Curaçao	2–1	3–2	2014 Caribbean Cup
19	15 July 2015	Bank of America Stadium, Charlotte, United States	Mexico	2–2	4–4	2015 CONCACAF Gold Cup
20	19 July 2015	MetLife Stadium, East Rutherford, United States	Panama	1–1	1–1 (5–6) (pen).	2015 CONCACAF Gold Cup
21	8 October 2015	Estadio Rommel Fernández, Panama City, Panama	Panama	1–0	2–1	Friendly
22	13 November 2015	Estadio Mateo Flores, Guatemala City, Guatemala	Guatemala	2–0	2–1	2018 FIFA World Cup qualifier
23	29 March 2016	Hasely Crawford Stadium, Port of Spain, Trinidad and Tobago	Saint Vincent and the Grenadines	3–0	6–0	2018 FIFA World Cup qualifier

== Honours ==
Stoke City

- FA Cup runner-up: 2010–11

Bournemouth

- Football League Championship: 2014–15

Individual

- Chaconia Medal Gold Class: 2006
- Trinidad and Tobago Football Federation's Player of the Year: 2007
- Sunderland Player of the Season: 2007–08
