= Michael Johnson (footballer, born 1988) =

English footballer

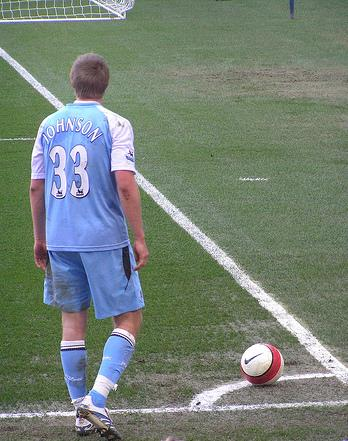
- Johnson playing for Manchester City in 2007

Personal information
- Full name: Michael Johnson
- Date of birth: 24 February 1988 (age 38)
- Place of birth: Urmston, England
- Height: 6 ft 0 in (1.83 m)
- Position: Midfielder

Youth career
- 1998–2000: Leeds United
- 2000–2001: Feyenoord
- 2001: Crewe Alexandra
- 2002: Liverpool
- 2002–2004: Everton
- 2004–2006: Manchester City

Senior career*
Years	Team	Apps	(Gls)
2006–2012	Manchester City	37	(2)
2011–2012	→ Leicester City (loan)	7	(0)
Total		44	(2)

International career
2003	England U16	1	(0)
2006–2007	England U19	6	(0)
2007–2008	England U21	2	(0)
- * Club domestic league appearances and goals

Michael Johnson (born 24 February 1988) is an English former professional footballer who played as a midfielder.

Johnson was a product of the Leeds United, Feyenoord, Crewe Alexandra, Liverpool, Everton and Manchester City youth academies. He made his Premier League debut for City during the 2006–07 season and went on to become somewhat of a first team regular. While with City he was an England youth international, for both the under-19 and under-21 teams.

Several injury setbacks that started during the 2008–09 season hampered his progress and he went on to only make four appearances for City in his final five years of his contract, playing his final match in a League Cup tie against Scunthorpe United in 2009. During the 2011–12 season Johnson was loaned out to Leicester City on a season long loan deal, but it was cut short due to injury. He was released from his contract with Manchester City in December 2012, over two years since his last appearance for the club.

== Club career ==
=== Youth career ===
Johnson began his youth career with Leeds United, joining Excelsior in 2000 and Everton in 2002. He joined his only senior club Manchester City in 2004, graduating to the first team in 2006. He was part of the Manchester City youth team that reached the 2006 FA Youth Cup Final.

Johnson was skipper of the FA Youth Cup runners-up team in the absence of Micah Richards during the 2005–06 season and became the 20th Academy Graduate to progress from Platt Lane to the City first team, making his debut away for manager Stuart Pearce at Wigan on 21 October 2006. His ability to run with the ball, score goals and operate box-to-box caught the eye both locally and nationally.

=== Manchester City ===
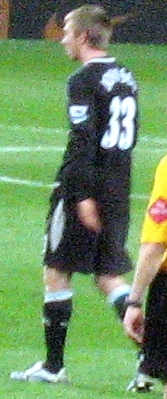
Johnson playing for Manchester City in 2007

On 21 October 2006, he was rewarded for his progress and made his Manchester City debut in the Premier League, in a 4–0 defeat by Wigan Athletic at the JJB Stadium. His second start came in a 2–0 win over Middlesbrough in March 2007, the start of a run of seven consecutive first team appearances, which was ended by a hamstring injury which ruled him out of a match against Aston Villa.

He scored his first goal for City in a 1–0 win over Derby County on 15 August 2007 at the City of Manchester Stadium; the first home league goal City had scored since the new year. Johnson spent the end of 2007 and early 2008 out of the team with an abdominal injury during which time he would have a double-hernia operation. He returned to action on 29 February 2008, playing the full 90 minutes in City's goal-less home draw with Wigan. Johnson finished the 2007–08 season with two goals.

Johnson started the 2008–09 season in good form, linking well with players such as Stephen Ireland and Elano in the first few matches of the season, however after this, Johnson failed to feature for nearly a year due to a recurrence of his abdominal injury after City's League Cup defeat by Brighton & Hove Albion on 24 September 2008. He would not return for nearly seven months when he played for the reserve team in April, but Johnson would not feature for the first team until the following pre-season.

Johnson made his return to action in City's pre-season match against South African team Orlando Pirates during the Vodacom Challenge, but a strain picked up in the warm-up for the next match ruled him out. Johnson made his first appearance of the 2009–10 season on 28 September 2009 in a 3–1 victory over West Ham United, coming on as a sub for Gareth Barry. On 28 October, Johnson scored his first goal in over a year in a League Cup tie against Scunthorpe United. On 10 December 2009, Manchester City announced that Johnson had suffered a serious knee injury in training which ruled him out of action until the end of the season.

On 27 July 2011, Johnson signed a season-long loan deal with Leicester City, managed by former Manchester City manager Sven-Göran Eriksson. However, his loan spell ended prematurely, in January 2012, when he sustained an injury, after making only nine appearances for the club.

In January 2013, it was reported that Johnson had been released from Manchester City prior to 25 December 2012. This was revealed after a photograph surfaced of him looking overweight and unfit. Johnson had only made four competitive first team appearances for City in his final five seasons, failing to make a single appearance for the club in the last three campaigns.

The apparent demise of his promising career was lamented by a number of those that had worked with him. Former Manchester City teammate Dietmar Hamann described him as an "outstanding" midfielder that reminded him of his Germany teammate Michael Ballack. Former manager Eriksson said that he was "An excellent player ... everyone thought he would become the next big star for England". City manager Roberto Mancini said: "A guy with a big talent – I am sad for him".

== International career ==
Johnson represented England at under-19 level and under-21 level.

== Personal life ==
Johnson was born in Urmston, Greater Manchester.

In February 2012, Johnson was arrested for drink-driving when police in Manchester city centre pulled him over and breathalysed him. While on bail for this offence, he was arrested again following a crash in the early hours in Trafford. Then again in June 2012 Johnson was arrested on suspicion of drink-driving at the scene of a collision after he crashed his Mercedes into a parked car while travelling to his girlfriend's house in Urmston. In September 2012 he was fined a total of £5,500 for all three offences by Manchester Magistrates Court.

In an interview with the Manchester Evening News following his release from Manchester City, he stated that he had been under treatment for several years by The Priory Clinic for mental health problems. Johnson added that he "would be grateful if I could now be left alone to live the rest of my life."

In January 2015, Johnson opened his own estate agent's business in his hometown of Urmston.

== Career statistics ==
Appearances and goals by club, season and competition
Club	Season	League			FA Cup		League Cup		Europe		Total	
Club	Season	Division	Apps	Goals	Apps	Goals	Apps	Goals	Apps	Goals	Apps	Goals
Manchester City	2006–07	Premier League	10	0	0	0	0	0	―		10	0
Manchester City	2007–08	Premier League	23	2	0	0	2	0	―		25	2
Manchester City	2008–09	Premier League	3	0	0	0	1	0	4	0	8	0
Manchester City	2009–10	Premier League	1	0	0	0	1	1	―		2	1
Manchester City	2010–11	Premier League	0	0	0	0	0	0	0	0	0	0
Manchester City	Total		44	2	0	0	6	1	4	0	45	3
Leicester City (loan)	2011–12	Championship	7	0	0	0	2	0	―		9	0
Career total			51	2	0	0	6	1	4	0	54	3
