= 2006–07 Manchester City F.C. season =

English football club season

Manchester City
2006–07 season
- Owner: Publicly traded company
- Chairman: John Wardle
- Manager: Stuart Pearce
- Stadium: City of Manchester Stadium
- FA Premier League: 14th
- FA Cup: Quarter-final
- League Cup: Second round
- Top goalscorer: League: Joey Barton (6 goals); All: Joey Barton (7 goals)
- Highest home attendance: 47,244 (vs. Manchester United, 5 May 2007)
- Lowest home attendance: 25,621 (vs. Sheffield Wednesday, 16 January 2007)
- Average home league attendance: 39,997
Home colours	Away colours	Third colours

Results summary – all competitions
	Wins	Draws	Losses	Win %
Home	7	6	8	33.3%
Away	7	4	12	30.4%
Both	14	10	20	31.8%

Results summary – Premier League
	Wins	Draws	Losses	Win %
Home	5	6	8	26.3%
Away	6	3	10	31.6%
Both	11	9	18	28.9%

The 2006–07 season was Manchester City Football Club's fifth consecutive season playing in the FA Premier League, the top division of English football, and its tenth season since the Premier League was first created with Manchester City as one of its original 22 founding member clubs. Overall, it was the team's 115th season playing in a division of English football, most of which have been spent in the top flight.

== Season review ==
The 2006–07 season proved tough for club which skirmished with relegation from the Premier League and ended up finishing in 14th position. The club were again eliminated from the League Cup by a League One team, this time by Chesterfield early on in the season. Ben Thatcher's elbow challenge on Pedro Mendes whilst playing Portsmouth shocked many – a challenge which prompted City to take unprecedented action and banned Thatcher for six matches by the club and a six weeks fine. Pearce called the challenge "indefensible" and the Football Association banned Thatcher for a further eight matches. The side also scored just ten goals at home in the league, and none after New Years Day in 2007, a record low in top-flight English football.

In December 2006, the club issued a statement regarding a possible takeover, and on 21 June, the Manchester City board accepted an £81.6 million offer for the club from former Thai prime minister Thaksin Shinawatra. One of his first moves was to schedule a press conference to announce former-England manager Sven-Göran Eriksson as his new manager – Eriksson's first job since leaving international duty.

== Team kit ==
For this season, the shirt sponsor for all of the club's kits continued to be the previous season's sponsor, Thomas Cook, while the team kits were produced by the previous season's supplier, Reebok.

Home	Away	Away alternate	Third

Goalkeeper strip 1 (v1)	Goalkeeper strip 1 (v2)	Goalkeeper strip 1 (v3)	Goalkeeper strip 2	Goalkeeper strip 3 (v1)	Goalkeeper strip 3 (v2)	Goalkeeper strip 3 (v3)

== Historical league performance ==
Prior to this season, the history of Manchester City's performance in the English football league hierarchy since the creation of the Premier League in 1992 is summarised by the following timeline chart – which commences with the last season (1991–92) of the old Football League First Division (from which the Premier League was formed).

== Friendly games ==
This season not all of the team's friendly games were played during the preparatory run-in to the official start of the new league campaign, with a couple of friendly games taking place during the course of the active season. The first of these games was perhaps just a "belated pre-season friendly" that was played with the season still only nine days old, while the other one against Blackpool in February was more of a mutually arranged scrimmage behind closed doors, with one of its intended purposes being to provide a "friendly competitive" tryout for the 28-year-old Belgian international striker, Émile Mpenza, who at the time the Manchester club was considering signing. This impromptu scrimmage served as a key part of Mpenza's brief trial with City and saw him perform well enough, with his scoring of the second goal in the 3–0 win, that he was subsequently signed by City two days later (his unattached free agent status permitting him to be signed outside of the January transfer window). The extemporaneous Valentine's Day friendly also gave some City players in need of match fitness, such as Didi Hamann and Stephen Jordan, a chance to get a full 90 minutes of play under their belts.

=== Pre-season ===
19 July 2006	Wrexham (Wales)	3–3	(England) Manchester City	Wrexham, Wales
19:45 BST	Llewellyn 35'; Done 59'; Distin 82' (o.g.)	MCFC report	6' Miller; 52', 65' Samaras	Stadium: Racecourse Ground; Attendance: 3,588; Referee: Mike Jones

22 July 2006	Rochdale (England)	2–3	(England) Manchester City	Rochdale, England
15:00 BST	Lambert 4'; Brown 12'	MCFC report	43' Samaras; 60' (pen.) Barton; 64' (pen.) Dickov	Stadium: Spotland; Attendance: 5,963

26 July 2006	Port Vale (England)	0–3	(England) Manchester City	Burslem, England
19:45 BST		MCFC report	8', 31', 40' Barton	Stadium: Vale Park; Attendance: 3,769

29 July 2006	Bradford City (England)	0–1	(England) Manchester City	Bradford, England
15:00 BST		MCFC report	7' Reyna	Stadium: Valley Parade; Attendance: 3,172; Referee: Anthony Taylor

4 August 2006	Shanghai Shenhua (China)	0–1	(England) Manchester City	Shanghai, China
20:30 BST	Du Wei (yellow card)	MCFC report	(yellow card) 18' Barton; 35' Samaras; (yellow card) 53' (yellow card) 78' (yellow-red card) Thatcher	Stadium: Hongkou Stadium

6 August 2006	Kashima Antlers (Japan)	4–3	(England) Manchester City	Shanghai, China
11:15 BST	Iwamasa 10'; Motoyama 39'; Chumbinho 61'; Pashiro 68'	MCFC report	30' Sibierski; 64' Samaras; 72' Barton	Stadium: Hongkou Stadium

==== Thomas Cook Trophy ====
12 August 2006	Manchester City (England)	0–1	(Portugal) Porto	Manchester, England
15:00 BST		MCFC report M.E.N. report	43' Adriano	Stadium: City of Manchester Stadium; Attendance: 20,375; Referee: Andre Marriner (England)

==== Mid-season ====
29 August 2006	Ballymena United (Northern Ireland)	1–3	(England) Manchester City	Ballymena, Northern Ireland
19:45 BST	Haveron 40'	BUFC report	14' Sibierski; 83' Corradi; 90' D. Mills	Stadium: The Showgrounds; Attendance: 5,000; Referee: Michael Ross (Carrickfergus)

14 February 2007	Blackpool (England)	0–3	(England) Manchester City	Blackpool, England
19:45 GMT		Report (404 error)	40' Sturridge; 48' Mpenza; 75' Johnson	Stadium: Bloomfield Road

== Competitive games ==
=== Premier League ===
==== Position in final standings ====
Pos	Team	Pld	W	D	L	GF	GA	GD	Pts
12	Middlesbrough	38	12	10	16	44	49	−5	46
13	Newcastle United	38	11	10	17	38	47	−9	43
14	Manchester City	38	11	9	18	29	44	−15	42
15	West Ham United	38	12	5	21	35	59	−24	41
16	Fulham	38	8	15	15	38	60	−22	39

Source: Barclays Premier League
Rules for classification: 1) points; 2) goal difference; 3) number of goals scored.

==== Results summary ====
Overall								Home						Away					
Pld	W	D	L	GF	GA	GD	Pts	W	D	L	GF	GA	GD	W	D	L	GF	GA	GD
38	11	9	18	29	44	−15	42	5	6	8	10	16	−6	6	3	10	19	28	−9

Last updated: 13 May 2007 (end of season).
Source: Premier League results 2006–07

==== Points breakdown ====
Points at home: 21
Points away from home: 21

Points against "Big Four" teams: 4
Points against promoted teams: 6

6 points: Fulham, Middlesbrough, West Ham United
4 points: Everton, Newcastle United, Sheffield United
3 points: Arsenal, Aston Villa
2 points: Watford
1 point: Bolton Wanderers, Charlton Athletic, Liverpool, Portsmouth
0 points: Blackburn Rovers, Chelsea, Manchester United, Reading,

Tottenham Hotspur, Wigan Athletic

==== Biggest & smallest ====
Biggest home wins: 3–1 vs. Fulham, 18 November 2006
2–0 vs. West Ham United, 23 September 2006
Biggest home defeat: 0–3 vs. Blackburn Rovers, 20 January 2007
Biggest away wins: 1–3 vs. Aston Villa, 29 November 2006 & vs. Fulham, 9 April 2007
0–2 vs. Middlesbrough, 17 March 2007
Biggest away defeat: 4–0 vs. Wigan Athletic, 21 October 2006

Biggest home attendance: 47,244 vs. Manchester United, 5 May 2007
Smallest home attendance: 35,776 vs. Fulham, 18 November 2006
Biggest away attendance: 75,858 vs. Manchester United, 9 December 2006
Smallest away attendance: 16,235 vs. Wigan Athletic, 21 October 2006

==== Results by round ====
Round	1	2	3	4	5	6	7	8	9	10	11	12	13	14	15	16	17	18	19	20	21	22	23	24	25	26	27	28	29	30	31	32	33	34	35	36	37	38
Ground	A	H	H	A	A	H	A	H	A	H	A	H	H	A	A	H	A	H	H	A	A	H	A	H	H	A	H	H	A	A	H	A	H	A	A	H	H	A
Result	L	D	W	L	L	W	D	D	L	W	L	D	W	L	W	D	L	L	L	W	W	W	D	L	L	L	L	L	W	W	D	W	D	L	D	L	L	L
Position	19	17	8	11	17	12	11	11	12	13	14	14	12	14	12	10	12	13	15	13	10	10	10	13	15	16	17	17	15	13	12	12	12	12	12	13	14	14

Updated to match(es) played on 13 May 2007 (end of season). Source: 2006–07 Premier League results
A = Away; H = Home; W = Win; D = Draw; L = Loss

==== Individual match reports ====
20 August 2006	Chelsea	3–0	Manchester City	Stamford Bridge; London
16:00	Terry 11'; Lampard 26'; Essien (yellow card) 63'; Drogba 78'	Report	Dabo (yellow card) 15'; Corradi (yellow card) 49' (yellow-red card) 63'; Dickov (yellow card) 71'	Attendance: 41,953; Referee: Steve Bennett

23 August 2006	Manchester City	0–0	Portsmouth	City of Manchester Stadium; Manchester
19:45		Report		Attendance: 37,214; Referee: Dermot Gallagher

26 August 2006	Manchester City	1–0	Arsenal	City of Manchester Stadium; Manchester
17:15	Barton 41'	Report		Attendance: 40,699; Referee: Uriah Rennie

11 September 2006	Reading	1–0	Manchester City	Madejski Stadium; Reading
20:00	Ingimarsson 23'	Report	Distin (yellow card) 22'; Reyna (yellow card) 52'; Sinclair (yellow card) 54'; Dabo (red card) 80'; Barton (yellow card) 90+1'	Attendance: 24,092; Referee: Howard Webb

17 September 2006	Blackburn Rovers	4–2	Manchester City	Ewood Park; Blackburn
15:00	Sinclair 18' (o.g.); Pedersen 43'; McCarthy 66'; Gallagher 89'	Report	Barton 38'; Ooijer 44' (o.g.)	Attendance: 18,403; Referee: Martin Atkinson

23 September 2006	Manchester City	2–0	West Ham United	City of Manchester Stadium; Manchester
15:00	Samaras 50', 63'	Report		Attendance: 41,073; Referee: Chris Foy

30 September 2006	Everton	1–1	Manchester City	Goodison Park; Liverpool
15:00	Johnson 44'	Report	Richards 90+4'	Attendance: 38,250; Referee: Andre Marriner

14 October 2006	Manchester City	0–0	Sheffield United	City of Manchester Stadium; Manchester
15:00		Report		Attendance: 42,192; Referee: Mike Dean

21 October 2006	Wigan Athletic	4–0	Manchester City	JJB Stadium; Wigan
12:45	Heskey 1'; Dunne 3' (o.g.); Camara 65'; Valencia 67'	Report		Attendance: 16,235; Referee: Phil Dowd

30 October 2006	Manchester City	1–0	Middlesbrough	City of Manchester Stadium; Manchester
20:00 GMT	Dunne 23'	Report		Attendance: 36,720; Referee: Howard Webb

4 November 2006	Charlton Athletic	1–0	Manchester City	The Valley; London
15:00	Bent 28'	BBC Sport report		Attendance: 26,011; Referee: Chris Foy

11 November 2006	Manchester City	0–0	Newcastle United	City of Manchester Stadium; Manchester
12:45		Report		Attendance: 40,571; Referee: Graham Poll

18 November 2006	Manchester City	3–1	Fulham	City of Manchester Stadium; Manchester
12:45	Corradi 12', 32'; Barton 45'	Report	John 62'	Attendance: 35,776; Referee: Alan Wiley

25 November 2006	Liverpool	1–0	Manchester City	Anfield; Liverpool
15:00	Gerrard 67'	Report		Attendance: 44,061; Referee: Rob Styles

29 November 2006	Aston Villa	1–3	Manchester City	Villa Park; Birmingham
19:45	McCann 65'	Report	Vassell 19'; Barton 32'; Distin 75'	Attendance: 30,124; Referee: Mike Dean

4 December 2006	Manchester City	0–0	Watford	City of Manchester Stadium; Manchester
20:00		Report		Attendance: 35,915; Referee: Mark Clattenburg

9 December 2006	Manchester United	3–1	Manchester City	Old Trafford; Manchester
12:45	Rooney 6'; Saha 45'; Ronaldo 85'	Report	Trabelsi 72'; Corradi (yellow card) 61' (yellow-red card) 90'	Attendance: 75,858; Referee: Graham Poll

17 December 2006	Manchester City	1–2	Tottenham Hotspur	City of Manchester Stadium; Manchester
15:00	Barton 63'	Report	Davenport 16'; Huddlestone 24'	Attendance: 39,285; Referee: Rob Styles

23 December 2006	Manchester City	0–2	Bolton Wanderers	City of Manchester Stadium; Manchester
15:00	Barton (red card) 87'	Report	Anelka 8', 25'	Attendance: 40,157; Referee: Mike Riley

26 December 2006	Sheffield United	0–1	Manchester City	Bramall Lane; Sheffield
15:00		Report	Ireland 77'	Attendance: 32,591; Referee: Mark Clattenburg

30 December 2006	West Ham United	0–1	Manchester City	Boleyn Ground; Upton Park
15:00		Report	Beasley 82'	Attendance: 34,574; Referee: Steve Bennett

1 January 2007	Manchester City	2–1	Everton	City of Manchester Stadium; Manchester
15:00	Samaras 50', 72'	Report	Osman 84'	Attendance: 39,836; Referee: Uriah Rennie

13 January 2007	Bolton Wanderers	0–0	Manchester City	Reebok Stadium; Horwich
15:00		Report		Attendance: 22,334; Referee: Andre Marriner

20 January 2007	Manchester City	0–3	Blackburn Rovers	City of Manchester Stadium; Manchester
17:15		Report	Pedersen 44', 62'; Derbyshire 90'	Attendance: 36,950; Referee: Phil Dowd

3 February 2007	Manchester City	0–2	Reading	City of Manchester Stadium; Manchester
15:00		BBC Sport report	Lita 79', 89'	Attendance: 38,676; Referee: Howard Webb

10 February 2007	Portsmouth	2–1	Manchester City	Fratton Park; Portsmouth
17:15	Mendes 4'; Kanu 80'	Report	Corradi 62'	Attendance: 19,244; Referee: Mike Dean

3 March 2007	Manchester City	0–1	Wigan Athletic	City of Manchester Stadium; Manchester
15:00		Report	Folan 18'	Attendance: 39,923; Referee: Howard Webb

14 March 2007	Manchester City	0–1	Chelsea	City of Manchester Stadium; Manchester
20:00		BBC Sport report	Lampard 28' (pen.)	Attendance: 39,429; Referee: Alan Wiley

17 March 2007	Middlesbrough	0–2	Manchester City	Riverside Stadium; Middlesbrough
15:00		Report	Distin 64'; Mpenza 74'	Attendance: 26,427; Referee: Keith Stroud

31 March 2007	Newcastle United	0–1	Manchester City	St James' Park; Newcastle
15:00		Report	Mpenza 80'	Attendance: 52,004; Referee: Graham Poll

6 April 2007	Manchester City	0–0	Charlton Athletic	City of Manchester Stadium; Manchester
17:15		Report		Attendance: 41,424; Referee: Alan Wiley

9 April 2007	Fulham	1–3	Manchester City	Craven Cottage; London
15:00	Bocanegra 74'	Report	Barton 20'; Beasley 36'; Vassell 59'	Attendance: 22,435; Referee: Steve Bennett

14 April 2007	Manchester City	0–0	Liverpool	City of Manchester Stadium; Manchester
15:00		Report		Attendance: 45,883; Referee: Uriah Rennie

17 April 2007	Arsenal	3–1	Manchester City	Emirates Stadium; London
19:45	Rosický 12'; Fàbregas 73'; Baptista 80'	Report	Beasley 40'	Attendance: 59,913; Referee: Mark Halsey

21 April 2007	Watford	1–1	Manchester City	Vicarage Road; Watford
15:00	Priskin 75'	Report	Vassell 53'	Attendance: 18,537; Referee: Rob Styles

28 April 2007	Manchester City	0–2	Aston Villa	City of Manchester Stadium; Manchester
15:00		Report	Carew 24'; Maloney 75'	Attendance: 40,799; Referee: Mark Halsey

5 May 2007	Manchester City	0–1	Manchester United	City of Manchester Stadium; Manchester
12:45		Report	Ronaldo 33' (pen.)	Attendance: 47,244; Referee: Rob Styles

13 May 2007	Tottenham Hotspur	2–1	Manchester City	White Hart Lane; Tottenham
15:00	Keane 10'; Berbatov 32'	Report	Mpenza 40'	Attendance: 35,426; Referee: Steve Bennett

=== League Cup ===
20 September 2006 Second Round	Chesterfield	2–1	Manchester City	Chesterfield, England
19:45 BST	Folan 51'; Niven 67'	MCFC report	Samaras 40'	Stadium: Saltergate; Attendance: 7,960; Referee: Kevin Wright

=== FA Cup ===
7 January 2007 Third Round	Sheffield Wednesday	1–1	Manchester City	Sheffield, England
15:00 GMT	MacLean 78'	MCFC report	Samaras 77' (pen.)	Stadium: Hillsborough Stadium; Attendance: 28,847; Referee: Graham Poll

16 January 2007 Third Round Replay	Manchester City	2–1	Sheffield Wednesday	Manchester, England
19:45 GMT	Ireland 44'; Vassell 56'	MCFC report	Bullen 51'	Stadium: City of Manchester Stadium; Attendance: 25,621; Referee: Mike Dean

28 January 2007 Fourth Round	Manchester City	3–1	Southampton	Manchester, England
15:00 GMT	Vassell 26'; Barton 45'; Beasley 70'	MCFC report	Jones 23'	Stadium: City of Manchester Stadium; Attendance: 26,496; Referee: Mark Clattenburg

18 February 2007 Fifth Round	Preston North End	1–3	Manchester City	Preston, England
13:10 GMT	Nugent 8'	MCFC report	Ball 35'; Hill 84' (o.g.); Ireland 90'	Stadium: Deepdale; Attendance: 18,890; Referee: Mike Riley

11 March 2007 Sixth Round	Blackburn Rovers	2–0	Manchester City	Blackburn, England
16:00 GMT	Mokoena 27'; Derbyshire 90'	MCFC report		Stadium: Ewood Park; Attendance: 27,743; Referee: Mike Dean

== First-team squad ==
Note: Flags indicate national team as defined under FIFA eligibility rules; some limited exceptions apply. Players may hold more than one non-FIFA nationality.

No.	Pos.	Nation	Player
1	GK	SWE	Andreas Isaksson
2	DF	ENG	Micah Richards
3	DF	ENG	Michael Ball
4	DF	ENG	Stephen Jordan
5	MF	FRA	Ousmane Dabo
7	MF	IRL	Stephen Ireland
8	MF	ENG	Joey Barton
9	FW	BEL	Émile Mpenza
10	MF	FRA	Djamel Abdoun (on loan from Ajaccio)
11	FW	ENG	Darius Vassell
12	GK	ENG	Nicky Weaver
14	FW	SCO	Paul Dickov
15	DF	FRA	Sylvain Distin
16	DF	ENG	Nedum Onuoha

No.	Pos.	Nation	Player
17	DF	CHN	Sun Jihai
18	DF	ENG	Danny Mills
20	FW	GRE	Georgios Samaras
21	MF	GER	Dietmar Hamann
22	DF	IRL	Richard Dunne
24	MF	USA	DaMarcus Beasley (on loan from PSV)
25	GK	ENG	Joe Hart
26	DF	ENG	Matt Mills
27	DF	TUN	Hatem Trabelsi
28	MF	ENG	Trevor Sinclair
30	FW	ITA	Bernardo Corradi
33	MF	ENG	Michael Johnson
36	FW	ENG	Daniel Sturridge
43	FW	ENG	Ishmael Miller

=== Left club during season ===
Note: Flags indicate national team as defined under FIFA eligibility rules; some limited exceptions apply. Players may hold more than one non-FIFA nationality.

No.	Pos.	Nation	Player
3	DF	WAL	Ben Thatcher (to Charlton Athletic)
6	MF	USA	Claudio Reyna (to New York Red Bulls)

No.	Pos.	Nation	Player
9	FW	ENG	Andrew Cole (to Portsmouth)
10	MF	FRA	Antoine Sibierski (to Newcastle United)

== Reserve squad ==
Note: Flags indicate national team as defined under FIFA eligibility rules; some limited exceptions apply. Players may hold more than one non-FIFA nationality.

No.	Pos.	Nation	Player
19	GK	DEN	Kasper Schmeichel
31	GK	ENG	Laurence Matthewson
32	DF	ENG	Nathan D'Laryea
34	DF	ENG	Sam Williamson
35	MF	ENG	Ashley Williams
37	MF	ENG	Kelvin Etuhu
38	DF	ENG	Shaleum Logan

No.	Pos.	Nation	Player
39	MF	SCO	Marc Laird
41	MF	ENG	Ashley Grimes
—	DF	IRL	Garry Breen
—	MF	WAL	Scott Evans
—	MF	IRL	Karl Moore
—	FW	WAL	Ched Evans

== Statistics ==
=== Appearances and goals ===
No.	Pos	Nat	Player	Total		Premier League		FA Cup		League Cup	
No.	Pos	Nat	Player	Apps	Goals	Apps	Goals	Apps	Goals	Apps	Goals
Goalkeepers
1	GK	(Sweden) SWE	Andreas Isaksson	14	0	12+2	0	0	0	0	0
12	GK	(England) ENG	Nicky Weaver	31	0	25	0	5	0	1	0
25	GK	(England) ENG	Joe Hart	1	0	1	0	0	0	0	0
Defenders
2	DF	(England) ENG	Micah Richards	34	1	28	1	5	0	1	0
3	DF	(England) ENG	Michael Ball	14	1	12	0	2	1	0	0
4	DF	(England) ENG	Stephen Jordan	15	0	12	0	2	0	1	0
15	DF	(France) FRA	Sylvain Distin	43	2	37	2	5	0	1	0
16	DF	(England) ENG	Nedum Onuoha	19	0	15+3	0	1	0	0	0
17	DF	(China) CHN	Sun Jihai	14	0	10+3	0	1	0	0	0
18	DF	(England) ENG	Danny Mills	1	0	0+1	0	0	0	0	0
22	DF	(Republic of Ireland) IRL	Richard Dunne	44	1	38	1	5	0	1	0
26	DF	(England) ENG	Matt Mills	1	0	1	0	0	0	0	0
Midfielders
5	MF	(France) FRA	Ousmane Dabo	17	0	10+3	0	4	0	0	0
7	MF	(Republic of Ireland) IRL	Stephen Ireland	29	3	14+10	1	4	2	0+1	0
8	MF	(England) ENG	Joey Barton	38	7	33	6	4	1	1	0
10	MF	(France) FRA	Djamel Abdoun	1	0	0	0	0+1	0	0	0
21	MF	(Germany) GER	Dietmar Hamann	19	0	12+4	0	1+1	0	1	0
24	MF	(United States) USA	DaMarcus Beasley	18	3	11+7	3	0	0	0	0
27	MF	(Tunisia) TUN	Hatem Trabelsi	24	2	16+4	1	2+2	1	0	0
28	MF	(England) ENG	Trevor Sinclair	21	0	14+4	0	1+1	0	1	0
33	MF	(England) ENG	Michael Johnson	10	0	10	0	0	0	0	0
Forwards
9	FW	(Belgium) BEL	Émile Mpenza	11	3	9+1	3	0+1	0	0	0
11	FW	(England) ENG	Darius Vassell	36	5	28+4	3	4	2	0	0
14	FW	(Scotland) SCO	Paul Dickov	18	0	9+7	0	0+1	0	0+1	0
20	FW	(Greece) GRE	Georgios Samaras	42	6	16+20	4	3+2	1	1	1
30	FW	(Italy) ITA	Bernardo Corradi	29	3	19+6	3	3	0	1	0
36	FW	(England) ENG	Daniel Sturridge	2	0	0+2	0	0	0	0	0
43	FW	(England) ENG	Ishmael Miller	19	0	3+13	0	0+2	0	0+1	0
Players transferred out during the season
3	DF	(Wales) WAL	Ben Thatcher	11	0	11	0	0	0	0	0
6	MF	(United States) USA	Claudio Reyna	16	0	12+3	0	0	0	1	0

Last updated: 31 May 2007
Source: Competitions

== Goal scorers ==
=== All competitions ===
Scorer	Goals
(England) Joey Barton	7
(Greece) Georgios Samaras	6
(England) Darius Vassell	5
(United States) DaMarcus Beasley	4
(Italy) Bernardo Corradi	3
(Republic of Ireland) Stephen Ireland	3
(Belgium) Émile Mpenza	3
(France) Sylvain Distin	2
(England) Michael Ball	1
(Republic of Ireland) Richard Dunne	1
(England) Micah Richards	1
(Tunisia) Hatem Trabelsi	1

=== Premier League ===
Scorer	Goals
(England) Joey Barton	6
(Greece) Georgios Samaras	4
(United States) DaMarcus Beasley	3
(Italy) Bernardo Corradi	3
(Belgium) Émile Mpenza	3
(England) Darius Vassell	3
(France) Sylvain Distin	2
(Republic of Ireland) Richard Dunne	1
(Republic of Ireland) Stephen Ireland	1
(England) Micah Richards	1
(Tunisia) Hatem Trabelsi	1

=== League Cup ===
Scorer	Goals
(Greece) Georgios Samaras	1

=== FA Cup ===
Scorer	Goals
(Republic of Ireland) Stephen Ireland	2
(England) Darius Vassell	2
(England) Michael Ball	1
(England) Joey Barton	1
(United States) DaMarcus Beasley	1
(Greece) Georgios Samaras	1

Information current as of 13 May 2007 (end of season)

== Transfers and loans ==
=== Transfers in ===
Date	Pos.	Player	From club	Transfer fee
22 May 2006	GK	(England) Joe Hart	(England) Shrewsbury Town	£1,500,000
26 May 2006	FW	(Scotland) Paul Dickov	(England) Blackburn Rovers	Free
20 June 2006	MF	(France) Ousmane Dabo	(Italy) Lazio	Free
12 July 2006	MF	(Germany) Dietmar Hamann	(England) Liverpool	Free
20 July 2006	FW	(Italy) Bernardo Corradi	(Spain) Valencia	Undisclosed
10 August 2006	DF	(Tunisia) Hatem Trabelsi	(Netherlands) Ajax	Bosman ruling
15 August 2006	GK	(Sweden) Andreas Isaksson	(France) Rennes	£2,000,000
31 January 2007	DF	(England) Michael Ball	(Netherlands) PSV	Undisclosed
16 February 2007	FW	(Belgium) Émile Mpenza	Unattached free agent	

=== Transfers out ===
Exit date	Pos.	Player	To club	Transfer fee
24 May 6	DF	(France) David Sommeil	(England) Sheffield United	Free
12 June 6	DF	(Denmark) Mikkel Bischoff	(England) Coventry City	Free
14 June 6	GK	(Belgium) Geert De Vlieger	(Belgium) Zulte Waregem	Free
5 July 6	FW	(England) Bradley Wright-Phillips	(England) Southampton	£500,000
31 July 6	MF	(England) Lee Croft	(England) Norwich City	£600,000
2 August 6	MF	(Republic of Ireland) Willo Flood	(Wales) Cardiff City	£200,000
14 August 6	GK	(England) David James	(England) Portsmouth	£1,200,000
31 August 6	FW	(England) Andy Cole	(England) Portsmouth	£500,000
31 August 6	MF	(France) Antoine Sibierski	(England) Newcastle United	Undisc.
11 January 7	DF	(Wales) Ben Thatcher	(England) Charlton Athletic	£500,000
23 January 7	MF	(United States) Claudio Reyna	(United States) Red Bull New York	Free

=== Loans in ===
Start date	End date	Pos.	Player	From club
31 August 2006	15 May 2007	MF	(United States) DaMarcus Beasley	(Netherlands) PSV
11 January 2007	15 May 2007	MF	(France) Djamel Abdoun	(France) Ajaccio

=== Loans out ===
Start date	End date	Pos.	Player	To club
25 August 2006	2 December 2006	GK	(Denmark) Kasper Schmeichel	(England) Bury
15 September 2006	18 November 2006	DF	(England) Danny Mills	(England) Hull City
1 January 2007	29 January 2007	GK	(England) Joe Hart	(England) Tranmere Rovers
5 January 2007	5 February 2007	FW	(Nigeria) Kelvin Etuhu	(England) Rochdale
11 January 2007	21 May 2007	GK	(Denmark) Kasper Schmeichel	(Scotland) Falkirk
20 January 2007	17 February 2007	DF	(England) Nathan D'Laryea	(England) Macclesfield Town
25 January 2007	24 February 2007	MF	(Scotland) Marc Laird	(England) Northampton Town
25 January 2007	19 March 2007	DF	(England) Matthew Mills	(England) Colchester United
22 March 2007	7 May 2007	MF	(England) Ashley Grimes	(England) Swindon Town
7 April 2007	7 May 2007	GK	(England) Joe Hart	(England) Blackpool
