= Paul Dickov =

Scottish footballer and manager

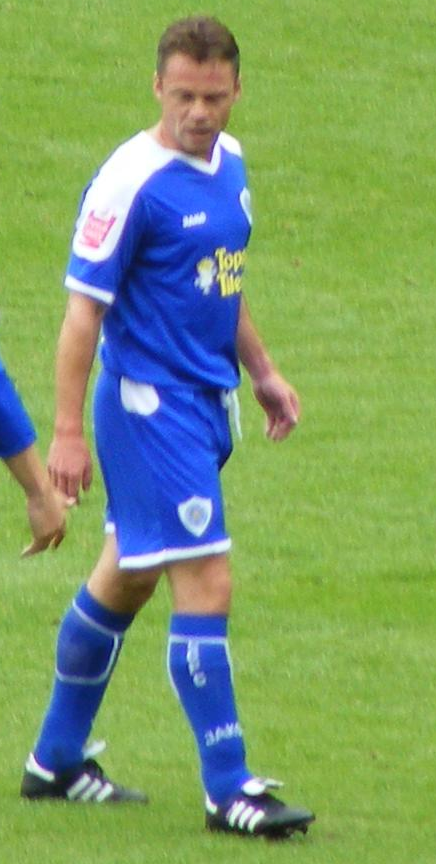
- Dickov in 2008

Personal information
- Full name: Paul Dickov
- Date of birth: 1 November 1972 (age 53)
- Place of birth: Livingston, Scotland
- Height: 1.65 m (5 ft 5 in)
- Position: Forward

Youth career
- 1989–1990: Arsenal

Senior career*
Years	Team	Apps	(Gls)
1990–1996	Arsenal	21	(3)
1993–1994	→ Luton Town (loan)	15	(1)
1994	→ Brighton & Hove Albion (loan)	8	(5)
1996–2002	Manchester City	155	(33)
2002–2004	Leicester City	89	(32)
2004–2006	Blackburn Rovers	50	(14)
2006–2008	Manchester City	16	(0)
2007	→ Crystal Palace (loan)	9	(0)
2008	→ Blackpool (loan)	11	(6)
2008–2010	Leicester City	21	(2)
2009	→ Derby County (loan)	16	(2)
2010	Leeds United	4	(0)
2010–2011	Oldham Athletic	2	(0)
Total		417	(98)

International career
1989	Scotland U16	6	(1)
1992–1993	Scotland U21	4	(0)
2000–2004	Scotland	10	(1)

Managerial career
- 2010–2013: Oldham Athletic
- 2013–2015: Doncaster Rovers
Medal record
Men's football
Representing Scotland
FIFA U-16 World Championship
Runner-up	1989 Scotland
- * Club domestic league appearances and goals

Paul Dickov (born 1 November 1972) is a Scottish former professional football manager and player who works as a television pundit for Manchester City TV.

Dickov played as a forward from 1990 to 2011, starting his career with Arsenal. He won the UEFA Cup Winners' Cup in 1994 with Arsenal, but struggled to hold a place in the first team and spent time on loan with Luton Town and Brighton & Hove Albion before moving to Manchester City in 1996. Over six seasons at the club, Dickov experienced two promotions and two relegations, playing in three different divisions. Dickov left in 2002 to join Leicester City, where he stayed for two seasons and, in 2004, he signed for Blackburn Rovers, and was part of the team which qualified for the UEFA Cup in 2005–06. Upon the expiry of his Blackburn contract in 2006, he rejoined Manchester City and later went on to play for Crystal Palace, Blackpool, Leicester City again, Derby County, and Leeds United.

Dickov made his full international debut for Scotland in 2000. In total he represented his country ten times, scoring one goal.

In June 2010, he became manager of Oldham Athletic, a position he held until February 2013. He was then manager of Doncaster Rovers from May 2013 to September 2015.

== Club career ==
=== Arsenal ===
Born in Livingston, West Lothian, Dickov joined the youth ranks of Arsenal in 1989, after playing for Scotland in the under-16 World Championship. First team chances were limited for Dickov under the management of George Graham, as he struggled to break into the Arsenal team who were rich in attacking talent. He was a member of Arsenal's squad during the first season of the Premier League, making his first team debut against Southampton on 20 March 1993 and scoring in end-of-season games against Crystal Palace and Tottenham. He then had loan spells at both Luton Town and Brighton & Hove Albion during the 1993–94 season, and was on the bench as Arsenal won the UEFA Cup Winners' Cup in 1994. Dickov left Arsenal to join Manchester City in 1996.

=== Manchester City ===
Dickov joined Manchester City on 22 August 1996 in a transfer valued between £750,000 and £1 million, the final signing of Alan Ball's Manchester City management. He made his debut as a substitute against Stoke City on 24 August, a 2–1 defeat which was Ball's final match. Dickov made his first Manchester City start in the next match, in a 2–1 win over Charlton Athletic. Dickov joined the club in a period of turmoil; in his first season at Manchester City he played under five different managers (three full-time appointments and two caretakers). A regular starter under Asa Hartford, Steve Coppell and Phil Neal, he played less frequently under Frank Clark, and finished the season with five goals from 25 League starts. At the start of the 1997–98 season, Dickov did not feature in the first team, but was restored to the starting line-up following injuries to Uwe Rösler and Lee Bradbury. Dickov finished the season as the City's top scorer with nine goals, but the club were relegated to the third tier of English football for the first time in their history.

Dickov, wearing the number 9 shirt, played a supporting role in a striking partnership with Shaun Goater in the 1998–99 season, scoring 16 goals in all competitions, including a hat-trick against Lincoln City. After a slow start, his form improved in the later part of the season, leading to City manager Joe Royle nicknaming him "the crocus" due to him coming to life in the spring months. He scored an important equaliser against Wigan Athletic in the play off semi final first leg (which was also the last goal to be scored at Springfield Park). The sixteenth goal was particularly crucial, a 15-yard, top corner injury time equaliser in the final of the promotion playoffs against Gillingham. Dickov's 95th-minute goal took the game to extra time, and the Manchester team ultimately won to earn promotion to the First Division. This goal, scored past Vince Bartram, the best man at Dickov's wedding, was voted City's Greatest Ever Goal in a 2005 poll conducted by Manchester City.

Dickov retained his place in the first team at the start of the 1999–2000 season. He started each of the first fifteen League games, despite suffering a facial injury on 26 September 1999 in which he lost a tooth. The run of starting appearances came to an end on 27 October, when he damaged knee ligaments in a match against Ipswich Town. During the subsequent absence, Manchester City signed Robert Taylor, and most of Dickov's appearances in the second half of the season were as a substitute. One of these substitute appearances was the final match of the season, a 4–1 win at Blackburn that clinched promotion to the Premier League.

When Manchester City returned to the Premier League for the 2000–01 season, it appeared that Dickov's chances of playing would be limited as City signed former FIFA World Player of the Year George Weah and Costa Rican international Paulo Wanchope. However, Dickov earned a place in the team, his performances attracted the attention of Scotland manager Craig Brown, who called him up to the Scotland squad for the first time.

City were relegated back into the First Division for the 2001–02 season and Kevin Keegan replaced Joe Royle as manager. Dickov found his first team opportunities at the club limited especially as the team had other strikers such as Paulo Wanchope, Shaun Goater and Darren Huckerby. Having fallen out of favour, on 22 February 2002 he moved to Leicester City for £150,000.

=== Leicester City ===
Dickov's Leicester debut came in a 3–0 defeat against Derby County. His first goals for Leicester came in his sixth appearance, when he scored both Leicester goals in a 2–1 victory against Blackburn Rovers, the club's first win for four months. However, Dickov only scored two more goals that season as Leicester finished bottom and were relegated.

He scored a career-high of 20 goals in the 2002–03 season as Leicester made an immediate return to the top flight, finishing runners-up in Division One behind Portsmouth.

He managed to score 13 goals in the 2003–04 season, but Leicester were relegated back to the First Division. On the final day of the 2003–04 season Leicester travelled to Dickov's former club, Arsenal, who were looking to make history by becoming the first English team since Preston North End to complete a top-flight league season unbeaten. Dickov scored the opening goal after 25 minutes, but Arsenal turned the game around to win 2–1 and the team became known as "The Invincibles".

Dickov moved to Blackburn Rovers, declining an offer of an improved contract from Leicester and exercising a contractual clause which allowed him to join a Premier League club for a nominal fee.

=== Blackburn Rovers ===
Dickov debuted for Blackburn Rovers as a half-time substitute against West Bromwich Albion on 14 August 2004. He scored his first goal for the club in the following match, a 3–2 defeat to Southampton. Dickov was involved in the majority of matches in the 2004–05 season, until a knee injury caused him to miss the last few weeks of the season. He finished the season with ten league goals. In 2005–06, Dickov found it hard to retain a regular place in the side, with manager Mark Hughes having signed forwards Craig Bellamy and Shefki Kuqi during the summer. A red card against West Ham United caused him to miss most of the first month of the season. He had a run of first team games in the autumn but starting appearances became fewer as the season progressed. He left the club in the summer of 2006 following the expiry of his contract.

=== Return to Manchester City ===
Dickov re-joined Manchester City on 26 May 2006, signing a two-year contract. He came on as a substitute in City's first game of the 2006–07 season against Chelsea, a 3–0 defeat. He then started the next three matches, including a 1–0 win over his former club Arsenal. Dickov suffered several injuries over the course of the season, including a back problem, a knee injury and a toe injury, the latter sidelining him for four months. Dickov made nine starts and seven substitute appearances in 2006–07, but failed to score a single goal. In May 2007 he announced his interest in pursuing a coaching role upon retirement.

Dickov was transfer listed by Manchester City in August 2007. He joined Crystal Palace on a three-month loan on 31 August 2007. On 31 January 2008, Dickov joined Blackpool on loan until May. Two days later he scored on his debut for Blackpool, what proved to be the winning goal in the Seasiders' 2–1 victory against Leicester City, one of his former clubs, at Bloomfield Road. He had come on as a 70th-minute substitute and scored the winning goal in the 89th minute. It was his first goal since 2 January 2006. He went on to score five goals in his first five appearances for the club, and on 4 March he was named as the Professional Footballers' Association (PFA)'s Fans Championship Player of the Month for February. By the end of his loan, Dickov had scored six goals in eleven appearances. He returned to Manchester City after his loan before then being released at the end of the season.

=== Return to Leicester City ===
An initial bid from his former club Leicester City was rejected a week earlier, and after pondering other offers from Toronto FC and Blackpool, Dickov decided to rejoin Leicester on 7 August 2008, signing a two-year contract. He made his debut in a 2–0 home win over Milton Keynes Dons on 9 August 2008, scoring his first goal in a 3–2 League Cup defeat to Fulham on 27 August. He made a total of 20 league games, scoring two goals as Leicester finished the 2008–09 season as League One champions. On 28 August 2009, Dickov joined Derby County on loan until January as cover. Due to an injury crisis Dickov found himself playing regularly at Derby, where his dogged style won over the support of the Derby fans. Dickov scored his first goal for Derby against Queens Park Rangers on 24 October 2009. After his loan spell at Derby ended, Dickov returned to Leicester in January 2010. He was released from his Leicester contract by mutual consent on 1 February 2010.

=== Leeds United ===
After his release by Leicester, Dickov trained with Leeds United and Toronto FC during February 2010. Leeds were initially unable to sign Dickov due to the fact he had already played for two clubs in the 2009–10 season, but he signed a short-term contract with Leeds on 3 March 2010 after they received special dispensation from FIFA. Dickov played four times for Leeds as they finished second in League One and won promotion, and he left the club at the end of his contract.

== International career ==
Dickov played in Scotland's run in the 1989 FIFA U-16 World Championship, where he scored in the final, but went on to miss in the penalty shoot-out as Scotland lost to Saudi Arabia.

He made his senior international debut for Scotland on 7 October 2000, coming on as a substitute in a World Cup qualifier against San Marino. He made two further substitute appearances that year, against Croatia and Australia. Limited first-team opportunities at club level then meant Dickov did not play for Scotland for another two years. Good form at Leicester City earned him a recall in September 2002, when he made his first start for Scotland. Playing out of position on the wing, Dickov was substituted at half-time as the team drew 2–2 against the Faroe Islands, who were 62 places lower in the world rankings at the time. In the return fixture a year later, Dickov scored his first international goal in a 3–1 win. His last cap came in a 1–0 defeat against Norway in October 2004. In total, Dickov earned ten Scotland caps and scored one goal.

== Style of play ==
Dickov's success as a striker was attributed to his tenacity and persistence; in a 2003 interview with the Independent on Sunday he provided a summary of his playing style: "The ability to battle is one of the main parts of my game. I know my limits. I am not the sort who gets the ball and is then going to beat five or six players and stick it in the top corner from God knows where. But, whether I'm playing well or not, the one thing you will get from me is 110 per cent, upsetting defenders and basically giving them pain." His combative approach resulted in Manchester City manager Joe Royle naming him "The Wasp", and during his time at Leicester he was known as "The Pest".

== Post-playing career ==
=== Oldham Athletic ===
On 9 June 2010, Dickov signed a one-year contract with League One club Oldham Athletic to become player-manager following the departure of previous manager Dave Penney. It was Dickov's first attempt at managing and expected to be his last club as a player. His first competitive game as Oldham manager ended in a 2–1 victory at rivals Tranmere with Dale Stephens scoring both goals, Dickov also praised the travelling group of Oldham Fans. On 4 September 2010, he made his debut coming on as a second-half substitute against Bristol Rovers.

Dickov opted to build a youthful side and made several controversial decisions at the start of the season, including offloading 2009–10 player of the season and club captain Sean Gregan, as well as top scorer Paweł Abbott and other first team players. The team went into the New Year in ninth position, with games in hand on the teams above them, and being unbeaten at home in the league. Results in the second half of the season were less consistent and the team finished the season in the bottom half of the table. On 6 May 2011 Dickov announced that he would make only his second appearance of the season for the first team in the final match of the season, and would then end his playing career to concentrate on management. He then came on as a 77th-minute substitute the following day against Milton Keynes Dons.

On 27 January 2013, Dickov led Oldham to a shock 3–2 victory against Premier League team Liverpool in the FA Cup, but he resigned on 3 February, primarily due to the team's poor league form.

=== Doncaster Rovers ===
On 20 May 2013, Dickov was appointed manager of Doncaster Rovers, who were promoted to the Championship having won the League One title in the 2012–13 season. Doncaster were relegated back to League One after just one season following a 1–0 final day defeat to Leicester City. On 8 September 2015, Dickov was dismissed as Doncaster manager due to poor performances.

=== Media career ===
Dickov now works as a television pundit, namely for Manchester City TV.

== Personal life ==
Dickov is married to Janet and the couple have three children: Lauren, Max and Sam; he owes his family name to his Bulgarian grandfather.

Dickov is a supporter of Manchester City.

In March 2004, Dickov, along with Leicester City teammates Keith Gillespie and Frank Sinclair, was falsely accused of sexual assault while at a training camp in La Manga, Spain. All three were subsequently cleared when forensic tests showed the allegations were false. Dickov would later describe it as the "darkest period" of his footballing career.

== Career statistics ==
=== Club ===
Appearances and goals by club, season and competition
Club	Season	League			FA Cup		League Cup		Other		Total	
Club	Season	Division	Apps	Goals	Apps	Goals	Apps	Goals	Apps	Goals	Apps	Goals
Arsenal	1992–93	Premier League	3	2	0	0	0	0	—		3	2
Arsenal	1993–94	Premier League	1	0	0	0	0	0	0	0	1	0
Arsenal	1994–95	Premier League	9	0	0	0	4	3	0	0	13	3
Arsenal	1995–96	Premier League	7	1	0	0	0	0	0	0	7	1
Arsenal	1996–97	Premier League	1	0	—		—		—		1	0
Arsenal	Total		21	3	0	0	4	3	0	0	25	6
Luton Town (loan)	1993–94	First Division	15	1	—		—		—		15	1
Brighton & Hove Albion (loan)	1993–94	Second Division	8	5	—		—		—		8	5
Manchester City	1996–97	First Division	29	5	1	0	2	0	—		32	5
Manchester City	1997–98	First Division	29	9	2	0	1	0	—		32	9
Manchester City	1998–99	Second Division	35	10	4	1	4	2	3 (Note: Appearances in Second Division play-offs)	2	46	15
Manchester City	1999–2000	First Division	34	5	1	0	2	1	—		37	6
Manchester City	2000–01	Premier League	21	4	1	0	3	1	—		25	5
Manchester City	2001–02	First Division	7	0	0	0	1	1	—		8	1
Manchester City	Total		155	33	9	1	13	5	3	2	180	41
Leicester City	2001–02	Premier League	12	4	—		—		—		12	4
Leicester City	2002–03	First Division	42	17	2	2	2	1	—		46	20
Leicester City	2003–04	Premier League	35	11	2	1	2	1	—		39	13
Leicester City	Total		89	32	4	3	4	2	—		97	37
Blackburn Rovers	2004–05	Premier League	29	9	6	1	0	0	—		35	10
Blackburn Rovers	2005–06	Premier League	21	5	1	0	4	2	—		26	7
Blackburn Rovers	Total		50	14	7	1	4	2	—		61	17
Manchester City	2006–07	Premier League	16	0	1	0	1	0	—		18	0
Manchester City	2007–08	Premier League	0	0	—		1	0	—		1	0
Manchester City	Total		16	0	1	0	2	0	—		19	0
Crystal Palace (loan)	2007–08	Championship	9	0	—		—		—		9	0
Blackpool (loan)	2007–08	Championship	11	6	—		—		—		11	6
Leicester City	2008–09	League One	20	2	3	0	2	1	1 (Note: Appearance in Football League Trophy)	0	26	3
Leicester City	2009–10	Championship	1	0	—		1	0	—		2	0
Leicester City	Total		21	2	3	0	3	1	1	0	28	3
Derby County (loan)	2009–10	Championship	16	2	0	0	—		—		16	2
Leeds United	2009–10	League One	4	0	—		—		—		4	0
Oldham Athletic	2010–11	League One	2	0	0	0	0	0	0	0	2	0
Career total			417	98	24	5	30	13	4	2	475	118

=== International ===
Appearances and goals by national team and year
National team	Year	Apps	Goals
Scotland	2000	3	0
Scotland	2001	0	0
Scotland	2002	1	0
Scotland	2003	3	1
Scotland	2004	3	0
Total		10	1

Scores and results list Scotland's goal tally first, score column indicates score after Dickov goal.

International goal scored by Paul Dickov
No.	Date	Venue	Opponent	Score	Result	Competition	Ref.
1	6 September 2003	Hampden Park, Glasgow, Scotland	Faroe Islands	2–1	3–1	Euro 2004 qualification	

=== Managerial record ===
Managerial record by team and tenure
Team	From	To	Record					Ref
Team	From	To	P	W	D	L	Win %	Ref
Oldham Athletic	9 June 2010	3 February 2013	141	43	37	61	30.5	
Doncaster Rovers	20 May 2013	8 September 2015	113	34	30	49	30.1	
Total			254	77	67	110	30.3	—

== Honours ==
Arsenal

- UEFA Cup Winners' Cup: 1993–94

Manchester City

- Football League Second Division play-offs: 1999

Leicester City

- Football League One: 2008–09

Individual

- PFA Team of the Year: 2002–03 First Division
