= 2007–08 Manchester City F.C. season =

English football club season

Manchester City
2007–08 season
- Owner & chairman: Thaksin Shinawatra
- Manager: Sven-Göran Eriksson
- Stadium: City of Manchester Stadium
- Premier League: 9th
- FA Cup: Fourth round
- League Cup: Fifth round
- Top goalscorer: League: Elano (8); All: Elano (10)
- Highest home attendance: 47,321 (vs. Liverpool, 30 December 2007)
- Lowest home attendance: 20,938 (vs. Norwich City, 25 September 2007)
- Average home league attendance: 42,126
Home colours	Away colours	Third colours

The 2007–08 season was Manchester City Football Club's sixth consecutive season playing in the Premier League, the top division of English football, and its 11th season since the Premier League was first created, with Manchester City as one of its original 22 founding member clubs. Overall, it was the team's 116th season playing in a division of English football, most of which have been spent in the top flight.

== Season review ==
The season started with a new owner in Thaksin Shinawatra and his newly appointed manager, Sven-Göran Eriksson. After spending three of the four previous Premier League seasons finishing in low mid-table positions (i.e., two to four places above the relegation zone), the Manchester City team was badly in need of an influx of new blood if it was to avoid a similar fate, or worse, in the upcoming season. Consequently, the newly infused funds from the club's wealthy Thai owner came at quite a fortuitous time for the team, and Eriksson was very active in the summer transfer market as he spent approximately £30 million adding eight relatively high-profile players to the City first team squad.

As a consequence of this mini spending spree Manchester City started the new season strongly and spent a large portion of it occupying one of the top five positions in the Premier League table. Unfortunately, the strong results of the first two-thirds of the season were not sustained in the final third and the team ultimately slipped down the rankings to finish the season in ninth place. This loss of form in the final months also led to Shinawatra summarily sacking Eriksson, a decision that was received with mixed emotions by the Manchester City supporters since both characters had achieved the status of "white knights" in their eyes for their respective financial and managerial contributions to the transformation of the club. Two days after his end-of-season dismissal, on 2 June 2008 Eriksson was replaced by Mark Hughes.

This season also saw Manchester City gain entry into the next season's UEFA Cup competition by finishing sixth in the English "Fair Play" rankings (with the five teams ranked above City having already qualified for European competition).

== Team kit ==
Supplier: Le Coq Sportif / Sponsor: Thomas Cook

Home	Home alt	Memorial	Away	Away alt.	Third	Third alt.	Third alt. 2

Goalkeeper 1	Goalkeeper 2	Goalkeeper 3

=== Kit description ===
The start of the 2007–08 Premier League campaign saw a number of changes for Manchester City, the most notable being the hiring of former England manager Sven-Göran Eriksson, while a somewhat less prominent change for the club saw the termination of Reebok as the team's kit supplier (for the four previous seasons) with the French sportswear manufacturer, Le Coq Sportif, now resuming this role once again. The shirt sponsor continued to be Thomas Cook, although the travel company had undergone a name change during the close season after its announced merger with MyTravel Group in June 2007, with the newly merged company now being called Thomas Cook Group.

The switch to a new kit supplier resulted in three new team kits for this season. The new home kit consisted of a return to a full sky blue shirt, but now with vertical white pin stripes on the body (but not the sleeves and shoulders) together with matching solid sky blue socks and the traditional all white shorts. The shirt sported a Le Coq Sportif logo on the upper portion of both sleeves with the Manchester City crest in the centre of the chest above the Thomas Cook logo, while the City crest was also repeated at the base of the right leg on the shorts.

The new away kit – a striking solid purple colour but sporting the same vertical white pin stripes on the body of the shirt as the home kit plus all the same kit supplier, sponsorship and club crest logos – was possibly a throwback to the classic maroon and thin white striped shirts that had been the club's one-time strip created for its appearance at Wembley in the 1956 FA Cup Final against Birmingham City. In comparison to the new home and away kits, the new third kit consisted of a relatively conservative all white shirt and socks with solid sky blue shorts, with the white shirt sporting a thin sky blue diagonal sash across the front of the left shoulder.

New goalkeeper strips – a two-tone green (solid light green shirt plus solid dark green shorts and socks), an all-grey change and a yellow third with purple shorts and socks, were introduced for this season.

On 10 February 2008, during the club's local derby game against Manchester United, the City team played in a one-off special kit to mark the 50-year memorial of the Munich air disaster. This kit was devoid of the pinstripes, contained no kit supplier or sponsorship logos and had a black ribbon on the right shoulder bearing "1958–2008", with "Manchester remembers" written underneath.

== Historical league performance ==
Prior to this season, the history of Manchester City's performance in the English football league hierarchy since the creation of the Premier League in 1992 is summarised by the following timeline chart – which commences with the last season (1991–92) of the old Football League First Division (from which the Premier League was formed).

== Friendly games ==
=== Pre-season ===
14 July 2007	Doncaster Rovers	1–3	Manchester City	Doncaster, England
15:00 BST	McDaid 17'	MCFC report	48' Corradi; 62' Richards; 64' Mpenza	Stadium: Keepmoat Stadium; Attendance: 6,375

18 July 2007	Örgryte IS	1–4	Manchester City	Varberg, Sweden
19:00 BST	Mwila 37'	MCFC report BBC Sport report YouTube video	18' Bianchi; 53' Corradi; 61' Samaras; 64' Logan; (yellow card) 65' Fernandes; (yellow card) 75' Dickov	Stadium: Påskbergsvallen; Attendance: 5,000+

21 July 2007	Carlstad United	0–4	Manchester City	Karlstad, Sweden
15:00 BST		MCFC report	5' Corradi; 20' 51' Bianchi; (yellow card) 52' Richards; 78' Laird	Stadium: Tingvalla IP

28 July 2007	Charleroi	2–0	Manchester City	Charleroi, Belgium
18:00 BST	Oulmers 20' (pen.); Jovial 35'	MCFC report M.E.N. report	(yellow card) 39' M. Mills	Stadium: Stade du Pays de Charleroi

1 August 2007	Shrewsbury Town	0–2	Manchester City	Shrewsbury, England
19:45 BST		MCFC report Guardian report	(yellow card) 42' Geovanni; 81' Corradi; 90' Dickov	Stadium: New Meadow

==== Thomas Cook Trophy ====
4 August 2007	Manchester City	0–1	Valencia	Manchester, England
15:00 BST	Corradi (yellow card) 74'	M.E.N. report Guardian report Dailymotion video	10' Silva; (yellow card) 52' Angulo	Stadium: City of Manchester Stadium; Attendance: 27,902; Referee: Mark Clattenburg (England)

==== Post-season ====
17 May 2008	Thai League All-Star XI	3–1	Manchester City	Bangkok, Thailand
17:00 (local time)	Ney Fabiano 37'; Sripan 44'; Chanabut 73'	MCFC report	22' Caicedo	Stadium: Rajamangala National Stadium; Attendance: 25,000

22 May 2008	Hong Kong Invitational XI	3–1	Manchester City	Hong Kong, China
18:00 (local time)	Giovane 27'; Festus 48'; Liang 71'	MCFC report	15' Hamann	Stadium: Hong Kong Stadium; Attendance: 20,000

== Competitive games ==
=== Premier League ===
==== Position in final standings ====
Pos	Team	Pld	W	D	L	GF	GA	GD	Pts	Qualification or relegation
7	Blackburn Rovers	38	15	13	10	50	48	+2	58	
8	Portsmouth	38	16	9	13	48	40	+8	57	Qualification for the UEFA Cup first round (Note: As FA Cup winners)
9	Manchester City	38	15	10	13	45	53	−8	55	Qualification for the UEFA Cup first qualifying round (Note: Manchester City qualified as the highest-ranked team not already qualified for European competitions of Premier League Fair Play Ranking by The Football Association, the top association among UEFA Fair Play ranking winners.)
10	West Ham United	38	13	10	15	42	50	−8	49	
11	Tottenham Hotspur	38	11	13	14	66	61	+5	46	Qualification for the UEFA Cup first round (Note: As League Cup winners)

Source: Barclays Premier League
Rules for classification: 1) points; 2) goal difference; 3) number of goals scored.
For further information on European qualification see Premier League – Competition

==== Results summary ====
Overall								Home						Away					
Pld	W	D	L	GF	GA	GD	Pts	W	D	L	GF	GA	GD	W	D	L	GF	GA	GD
38	15	10	13	45	53	−8	55	11	4	4	28	20	+8	4	6	9	17	33	−16

Last updated: 11 May 2008 (end of season).
Source: Premier League results 2007–08

==== Points breakdown ====
Points at home: 37
Points away from home: 18

Points against "Big Four" teams: 7
Points against promoted teams: 13

6 points: Manchester United, Newcastle United, Sunderland
4 points: Aston Villa, Bolton Wand., Derby County, Portsmouth, West Ham Utd.
3 points: Birmingham City, Middlesbrough, Reading, Tottenham Hotspur
2 points: Wigan Athletic
1 point: Blackburn Rovers, Fulham, Liverpool
0 points: Arsenal, Chelsea, Everton

==== Biggest & smallest ====
Biggest home wins: 4–2 vs. Bolton Wanderers, 15 December 2007
3–1 vs. Middlesbrough, 7 October 2007 & vs. Portsmouth, 20 April 2008
& vs. Newcastle United, 29 September 2007
Biggest home defeats: 1–3 vs. Arsenal, 2 February 2008
0–2 vs. Everton, 25 February 2008 & vs. Chelsea, 5 April 2008
Biggest away wins: 0–2 vs. West Ham, 11 Aug. 2007 & vs. Newcastle Utd., 2 Jan. 2008
Biggest away defeat: 8–1 vs. Middlesbrough, 11 May 2008

Biggest home attendance: 47,321 vs. Liverpool, 30 December 2007
Smallest home attendance: 38,261 vs. Wigan Athletic, 1 March 2008
Biggest away attendance: 75,970 vs. Manchester United, 10 February 2008
Smallest away attendance: 18,614 vs. Wigan Athletic, 1 December 2007

==== Results per matchday ====
Matchday	1	2	3	4	5	6	7	8	9	10	11	12	13	14	15	16	17	18	19	20	21	22	23	24	25	26	27	28	29	30	31	32	33	34	35	36	37	38
Ground	A	H	H	A	A	H	A	H	H	H	A	H	A	H	A	A	H	A	H	H	A	A	H	A	H	A	H	H	A	H	A	A	H	A	H	H	A	A
Result	W	W	W	L	L	W	D	W	W	W	L	W	D	W	D	L	W	D	D	D	W	L	D	D	L	W	L	D	L	W	D	L	L	W	W	L	L	L
Position	2	2	1	2	5	2	2	3	3	3	3	3	3	4	6	4	4	5	5	4	7	5	6	7	7	7	8	8	8	8	9	9	9	8	8	8	9	9

Updated to match(es) played on 11 May 2008. Source: 2007–08 Premier League results
A = Away; H = Home; W = Win; D = Draw; L = Loss

==== Individual match reports ====
11 August 2007 1	West Ham United	0–2	Manchester City	London, England
15:00 BST		MCFC report	Bianchi 18'; Geovanni 87'	Stadium: Upton Park; Attendance: 34,921; Referee: Peter Walton

15 August 2007 2	Manchester City	1–0	Derby County	Manchester, England
19:45 BST	Johnson 43'	MCFC report		Stadium: City of Manchester Stadium; Attendance: 43,620; Referee: L. S. Mason

19 August 2007 3	Manchester City	1–0	Manchester United	Manchester, England
13:30 BST	Geovanni 31'	MCFC report YouTube video		Stadium: City of Manchester Stadium; Attendance: 44,955; Referee: Mark Clattenburg

25 August 2007 4	Arsenal	1–0	Manchester City	London, England
15:00 BST	Fàbregas 80'	MCFC report		Stadium: Emirates Stadium; Attendance: 60,114; Referee: Chris Foy

2 September 2007 5	Blackburn Rovers	1–0	Manchester City	Blackburn, England
15:00 BST	McCarthy 13'; Kerimoğlu (yellow card) 54' (yellow-red card)	MCFC report	Dunne (yellow card) 65' (red card)	Stadium: Ewood Park; Attendance: 26,881; Referee: Mike Dean

16 September 2007 6	Manchester City	1–0	Aston Villa	Manchester, England
16:00 BST	Johnson 48'	MCFC report		Stadium: City of Manchester Stadium; Attendance: 38,363; Referee: Martin Atkinson

22 September 2007 7	Fulham	3–3	Manchester City	London, England
15:00 BST	Davies 13'; Bouazza 48'; Murphy 74'	MCFC report	Petrov 36', 60'; Mpenza 50'	Stadium: Craven Cottage; Attendance: 24,674; Referee: Mark Halsey

29 September 2007 8	Manchester City	3–1	Newcastle United	Manchester, England
12:45 BST	Petrov 37'; Mpenza 47'; Elano 87'	MCFC report	Martins 29'	Stadium: City of Manchester Stadium; Attendance: 40,606; Referee: Chris Foy

7 October 2007 9	Manchester City	3–1	Middlesbrough	Manchester, England
15:00 BST	Riggott 10' (o.g.); Elano 33', 63'	MCFC report	Hutchinson 88'	Stadium: City of Manchester Stadium; Attendance: 40,438; Referee: Steve Bennett

20 October 2007 10	Manchester City	1–0	Birmingham City	Manchester, England
15:00 BST	Elano 36'	MCFC report		Stadium: City of Manchester Stadium; Attendance: 45,688; Referee: Mike Dean

27 October 2007 11	Chelsea	6–0	Manchester City	London, England
15:00 BST	Essien 16'; Drogba 31', 56'; Cole 60'; Kalou 75'; Shevchenko 90'	MCFC report		Stadium: Stamford Bridge; Attendance: 41,832; Referee: Mike Riley

5 November 2007 12	Manchester City	1–0	Sunderland	Manchester, England
20:00 GMT	Ireland 66'	MCFC report		Stadium: City of Manchester Stadium; Attendance: 40,038; Referee: Alan Wiley

11 November 2007 13	Portsmouth	0–0	Manchester City	Portsmouth, England
16:00 GMT		MCFC report		Stadium: Fratton Park; Attendance: 19,529; Referee: Mark Halsey

24 November 2007 14	Manchester City	2–1	Reading	Manchester, England
15:00 GMT	Petrov 11'; Ireland 90'	MCFC report	Harper 43'	Stadium: City of Manchester Stadium; Attendance: 43,813; Referee: Steve Tanner

1 December 2007 15	Wigan Athletic	1–1	Manchester City	Wigan, England
15:00 GMT	Scharner 24'; Melchiot (red card) 88'	MCFC report	Geovanni 1'	Stadium: JJB Stadium; Attendance: 18,614; Referee: Mike Riley

9 December 2007 16	Tottenham Hotspur	2–1	Manchester City	London, England
15:00 GMT	Chimbonda 44'; Defoe 82'	MCFC report	Bianchi 60'; Ireland (red card) 81'	Stadium: White Hart Lane; Attendance: 35,646; Referee: Mark Halsey

15 December 2007 17	Manchester City	4–2	Bolton Wanderers	Manchester, England
15:00 GMT	Bianchi 7'; Michalík 48' (o.g.); Vassell 77'; Etuhu 90'	MCFC report	Diouf 31'; Nolan 40'	Stadium: City of Manchester Stadium; Attendance: 40,506; Referee: P. Walton

22 December 2007 18	Aston Villa	1–1	Manchester City	Birmingham, England
15:00 GMT	Carew 14'	MCFC report	Bianchi 11'	Stadium: Villa Park; Attendance: 41,455; Referee: Lee Mason

27 December 2007 19	Manchester City	2–2	Blackburn Rovers	Manchester, England
19:45 GMT	Vassell 27'; Nelsen 30' (o.g.)	MCFC report	Santa Cruz 28', 84'	Stadium: City of Manchester Stadium; Attendance: 42,112; Referee: Howard Webb

30 December 2007 20	Manchester City	0–0	Liverpool	Manchester, England
16:00 GMT		MCFC report		Stadium: City of Manchester Stadium; Attendance: 47,321; Referee: Uriah Rennie

2 January 2008 21	Newcastle United	0–2	Manchester City	Newcastle, England
19:45 GMT		MCFC report	Elano 38'; Fernandes 76'	Stadium: St James' Park; Attendance: 50,956; Referee: Martin Atkinson

12 January 2008 22	Everton	1–0	Manchester City	Liverpool, England
15:00 GMT	Lescott 31'	MCFC report		Stadium: Goodison Park; Attendance: 38,474; Referee: Mark Halsey

20 January 2008 23	Manchester City	1–1	West Ham United	Manchester, England
16:00 GMT	Vassell 16'	MCFC report	Cole 8'	Stadium: City of Manchester Stadium; Attendance: 39,042; Referee: Phil Dowd

30 January 2008 24	Derby County	1–1	Manchester City	Derby, England
19:45 GMT	Jihai 47' (o.g.)	BBC Sport report MCFC report	Sturridge 63'	Stadium: Pride Park Stadium; Attendance: 31,368; Referee: Steve Bennett

2 February 2008 25	Manchester City	1–3	Arsenal	Manchester, England
12:45 GMT	Fernandes 28'	BBC Sport report MCFC report	Adebayor 9', 88'; Eduardo 26'	Stadium: City of Manchester Stadium; Attendance: 46,426; Referee: Andre Marriner

10 February 2008 26	Manchester United	1–2	Manchester City	Manchester, England
13:30 GMT	O'Shea (yellow card) 57'; Carrick 90'	BBC Sport report MCFC report	Vassell 24'; Benjani 45'	Stadium: Old Trafford; Attendance: 75,970; Referee: Howard Webb

25 February 2008 27	Manchester City	0–2	Everton	Manchester, England
20:00 GMT	Petrov (red card) 90'	BBC Sport report MCFC report	Yakubu 30'; Lescott 37'	Stadium: City of Manchester Stadium; Attendance: 41,478; Referee: Rob Styles

1 March 2008 28	Manchester City	0–0	Wigan Athletic	Manchester, England
17:15 GMT		BBC Sport report MCFC report		Stadium: City of Manchester Stadium; Attendance: 38,261; Referee: Steve Bennett

8 March 2008 29	Reading	2–0	Manchester City	Reading, England
15:00 GMT	Long 62'; Kitson 87'	BBC Sport report MCFC report		Stadium: Madejski Stadium; Attendance: 24,062; Referee: Uriah Rennie

16 March 2008 30	Manchester City	2–1	Tottenham Hotspur	Manchester, England
16:00 GMT	Ireland 59'; Onuoha 71'	BBC Sport report MCFC report	Keane 32'	Stadium: City of Manchester Stadium; Attendance: 40,108; Referee: Mark Clattenburg

22 March 2008 31	Bolton Wanderers	0–0	Manchester City	Bolton, England
15:00 GMT		MCFC report		Stadium: Reebok Stadium; Attendance: 22,633; Referee: Andre Marriner

29 March 2008 32	Birmingham City	3–1	Manchester City	Birmingham, England
15:00 GMT	Zárate 40', 54'; Queudrue (red card) 57'; McSheffrey 77' (pen.)	BBC Sport report MCFC report	Elano 59' (pen.)	Stadium: St Andrew's; Attendance: 22,962; Referee: Rob Styles

5 April 2008 33	Manchester City	0–2	Chelsea	Manchester, England
15:00 BST		BBC Sport report MCFC report	Dunne 6' (o.g.); Kalou 53'	Stadium: City of Manchester Stadium; Attendance: 42,594; Referee: Chris Foy

12 April 2008 34	Sunderland	1–2	Manchester City	Sunderland, England
15:00 BST	Whitehead 82'	BBC Sport report MCFC report	Elano 79' (pen.); Vassell 87'	Stadium: Stadium of Light; Attendance: 46,797; Referee: Mike Riley

20 April 2008 35	Manchester City	3–1	Portsmouth	Manchester, England
16:00 BST	Vassell 11'; Petrov 13'; Benjani 74'	BBC Sport report MCFC report	Utaka 24'; Hreiðarsson (red card) 40'	Stadium: City of Manchester Stadium; Attendance: 40,205; Referee: Andre Marriner

26 April 2008 36	Manchester City	2–3	Fulham	Manchester, England
15:00 BST	Ireland 10'; Benjani 21'	BBC Sport report MCFC report	Kamara 69', 90'; Murphy 79'	Stadium: City of Manchester Stadium; Attendance: 43,634; Referee: Mike Dean

4 May 2008 37	Liverpool	1–0	Manchester City	Liverpool, England
16:00 BST	Torres 58'	BBC Sport report MCFC report		Stadium: Anfield; Attendance: 43,074; Referee: Mark Halsey

11 May 2008 38	Middlesbrough	8–1	Manchester City	Middlesbrough, England
15:00 BST	Downing 16' (pen.), 58'; Alves 37', 60', 90'; Johnson 70'; Rochemback 80'; Aliadiere 85'	BBC Sport report MCFC report	Dunne (red card) 15'; Elano 88'	Stadium: Riverside Stadium; Attendance: 27,613; Referee: Phil Dowd

=== League Cup ===
29 August 2007 Second Round	Bristol City	1–2	Manchester City	Bristol, England
19:45 BST	Orr 69'	MCFC report	Mpenza 17'; Bianchi 81'	Stadium: Ashton Gate Stadium; Attendance: 14,541; Referee: Richard Beeby

25 September 2007 Third Round	Manchester City	1–0	Norwich City	Manchester, England
19:45 BST	Samaras 89'	MCFC report		Stadium: City of Manchester Stadium; Attendance: 20,938; Referee: Andre Marriner

31 October 2007 Fourth Round	Bolton Wanderers	0–1	Manchester City	Bolton, England
20:00 GMT		MCFC report	Elano 85' (pen.)	Stadium: Reebok Stadium; Attendance: 15,501; Referee: Howard Webb

18 December 2007 Fifth Round	Manchester City	0–2	Tottenham Hotspur	Manchester, England
19:45 GMT		MCFC report	Defoe 5'; Zokora (red card) 19'; Malbranque 83'	Stadium: City of Manchester Stadium; Attendance: 38,564; Referee: Steve Bennett

=== FA Cup ===
5 January 2008 Third Round	West Ham United	0–0	Manchester City	London, England
15:00 GMT		MCFC report		Stadium: Upton Park; Attendance: 33,806; Referee: Rob Styles

16 January 2008 Third Round Replay	Manchester City	1–0	West Ham United	Manchester, England
15:00 GMT	Elano 73'	MCFC report		Stadium: City of Manchester Stadium; Attendance: 27,809; Referee: Mark Clattenburg

27 January 2008 Fourth Round	Sheffield United	2–1	Manchester City	Sheffield, England
16:00 GMT	Shelton 11'; Stead 24'	MCFC report	Sturridge 48'	Stadium: Bramall Lane; Attendance: 20,800; Referee: Alan Wiley

== Playing statistics ==
No.	Pos.	Player	League		FA Cup		League Cup		Total		Discipline	
No.	Pos.	Player	Apps.	Goals	Apps.	Goals	Apps.	Goals	Apps.	Goals	Yellow card	Red card
1	GK	(Sweden) Andreas Isaksson	5				1		6			
2	DF	(England) Micah Richards (vc)	25		2		2		29		4	
3	DF	(England) Michael Ball	28 (9)		3		4 (1)		35 (10)		2	
4	DF	(England) Nedum Onuoha	16 (3)	1	2		3 (1)		21 (4)	1		
Sold	MF	(France) Ousmane Dabo					1 (1)		1 (1)			
6	MF	(England) Michael Johnson	23	2			2		25	2	4	
7	MF	(Republic of Ireland) Stephen Ireland	33 (1)	4	3 (1)		3		39 (2)	4	2	/ 1
8	MF	(Brazil) Geovanni	19 (17)	3	1 (1)		3 (1)		23 (19)	3	4	
9	FW	(Belgium) Émile Mpenza	15 (7)	2	1		2 (1)	1	18 (8)	3		
10	FW	(Italy) Rolando Bianchi	19 (12)	4	2 (2)		3	1	24 (14)	5		
11	MF	(Brazil) Elano	34 (5)	8	2	1	2	1	38 (5)	10	5	
12	FW	(England) Darius Vassell	27 (6)	6	3		2 (1)		32 (7)	6	3	
14	FW	(Scotland) Paul Dickov					1 (1)		1 (1)			
15	MF	(Bulgaria) Martin Petrov	34	5	3		1		38	5	2	/ 1
16	DF	(Croatia) Vedran Ćorluka	37 (1)		3		3		43 (1)		5	
17	DF	(China) Sun Jihai	14 (7)				2		16 (7)		2	
19	GK	(Denmark) Kasper Schmeichel	7						7			
20	FW	(Greece) Georgios Samaras	5 (3)				2	1	7 (3)	1		
21	MF	(Germany) Dietmar Hamann	29 (3)		3		2		34 (3)		10	
22	DF	(Republic of Ireland) Richard Dunne (c)	36		3		3		42		4	/ 2
24	DF	(Spain) Javier Garrido	27 (5)				2		29 (5)		4	
25	GK	(England) Joe Hart	26		3		3		32			
27	FW	(Zimbabwe) Benjani	13 (1)	3					13 (1)	3		
28	MF	(Switzerland) Gélson Fernandes	26 (5)	2	3 (2)		3 (1)		32 (8)	2	6	
29	FW	(Bulgaria) Valeri Bojinov	3 (2)						3 (2)			
30	MF	(Mexico) Nery Castillo	10 (8)		2				12 (8)			
33	FW	(Wales) Ched Evans					1 (1)		1 (1)			
34	DF	(England) Sam Williamson	1 (1)						1 (1)		1	
36	FW	(England) Daniel Sturridge	3 (1)	1	1 (1)	1			4 (2)	2		
37	MF	(Nigeria) Kelvin Etuhu	6 (4)	1	1 (1)		1 (1)		8 (6)	1	1	
38	DF	(England) Shaleum Logan					2		2			
20	FW	(Ecuador) Felipe Caicedo	7 (7)						7 (7)		1	
TOTALS				42		2		4		48	60	/ 4

Information current as of 11 May 2008 (end of season)

Last updated: 16 January 2011.
Source: (for players and positions) Season 2007–08 First Team Squad (for squad numbers) Season 2007–08 Squad Numbers (for actual stats.) All match Reports in Competitive games section above

== Goal scorers ==
=== All competitions ===
Scorer	Goals
(Brazil) Elano	10
(England) Darius Vassell	6
(Italy) Rolando Bianchi	5
(Bulgaria) Martin Petrov	5
(Republic of Ireland) Stephen Ireland	4
(Brazil) Geovanni	3
(Belgium) Émile Mpenza	3
(Zimbabwe) Benjani Mwaruwari	3
(Switzerland) Gélson Fernandes	2
(England) Michael Johnson	2
(England) Daniel Sturridge	2
(Nigeria) Kelvin Etuhu	1
(England) Nedum Onuoha	1
(Greece) Georgios Samaras	1

=== Premier League ===
Scorer	Goals
(Brazil) Elano	8
(England) Darius Vassell	6
(Bulgaria) Martin Petrov	5
(Italy) Rolando Bianchi	4
(Republic of Ireland) Stephen Ireland	4
(Brazil) Geovanni	3
(Zimbabwe) Benjani Mwaruwari	3
(Switzerland) Gélson Fernandes	2
(England) Michael Johnson	2
(Belgium) Émile Mpenza	2
(Nigeria) Kelvin Etuhu	1
(England) Nedum Onuoha	1
(England) Daniel Sturridge	1

=== League Cup ===
Scorer	Goals
(Brazil) Elano	1
(Italy) Rolando Bianchi	1
(Belgium) Émile Mpenza	1
(Greece) Georgios Samaras	1

=== FA Cup ===
Scorer	Goals
(Brazil) Elano	1
(England) Daniel Sturridge	1

Information current as of 11 May 2008 (end of season)

== Awards ==
=== Premier League awards ===
Awarded monthly to the player and manager that were chosen by a panel assembled by the Premier League's sponsor

Month	Manager of the Month	Player of the Month
August 2007	(Sweden) Sven-Göran Eriksson	(England) Micah Richards

=== Thomas Cook Player of the Month awards ===
Awarded to the player in each category that receives the most votes in a poll conducted each month on the MCFC OWS

Month	First Team	Reserve Team	Academy
August/September	(Germany) Dietmar Hamann	(England) Richard Martin	(England) Scott Kay
October	(Brazil) Elano	(England) Ashley Grimes	(England) Ben Mee
November	(Croatia) Vedran Ćorluka	(England) Javan Vidal	(England) Kieran Trippier
December	(Republic of Ireland) Richard Dunne	(Republic of Ireland) Karl Moore	(England) David Ball
January	(England) Michael Ball	not announced	(Slovakia) Vladimír Weiss
February	(England) Joe Hart	(Republic of Ireland) Paul Marshall	(England) Greg Hartley
March	(Switzerland) Gélson Fernandes	(England) Adam Clayton	(England) Andrew Tutte
April	(England) Darius Vassell	(England) Sam Williamson	(Slovakia) Vladimír Weiss

=== Football Association of Ireland awards ===
Player	Year 2007 awards
(Republic of Ireland) Richard Dunne	International Player of the Year
(Republic of Ireland) Stephen Ireland	Young International Player of the Year

=== Official Supporters Club awards ===
Player	Season 2007–08 awards
(Republic of Ireland) Richard Dunne	Player of the Year
(England) Joe Hart	Young Player of the Year
(England) Ben Mee	Most Promising Player of the Year

== Transfers and loans ==
=== Transfers in ===
==== First team ====
Date	Pos.	Player	From club	Transfer fee
13 July 2007	FW	(Italy) Rolando Bianchi	(Italy) Reggina	£8.8M
14 July 2007	MF	(Switzerland) Gélson Fernandes	(Switzerland) Sion	£4.2M
17 July 2007	MF	(Brazil) Geovanni	(Brazil) Cruzeiro	Free
26 July 2007	MF	(Bulgaria) Martin Petrov	(Spain) Atlético Madrid	£4.7M
2 Aug. 2007	DF	(Croatia) Vedran Ćorluka	(Croatia) Dinamo Zagreb	£8M
2 Aug. 2007	MF	(Brazil) Elano	(Ukraine) Shakhtar Donetsk	£8M
2 Aug. 2007	DF	(Spain) Javier Garrido	(Spain) Real Sociedad	£1.5M
3 Aug. 2007	FW	(Bulgaria) Valeri Bojinov	(Italy) Fiorentina	£5.75M
31 Jan. 2008	FW	(Ecuador) Felipe Caicedo	(Switzerland) Basel	£5.2M
31 Jan. 2008	FW	(Zimbabwe) Benjani	(England) Portsmouth	£3.87M

==== Reserves & Academy ====
Date	Pos.	Player	From club	Transfer fee
10 Aug. 07	GK	(England) Richard Martin	Free agent / 1-month trial	
16 Nov. 07	FW	(Thailand) Teerasil Dangda	(Thailand) Mueang Thong NongJork	Free
16 Nov. 07	DF	(Thailand) Kiatprawut Saiwaeo	(Thailand) Chonburi	Free
16 Nov. 07	DF	(Thailand) Suree Sukha	(Thailand) Chonburi	Free

=== Transfers out ===
==== First team ====
Exit date	Pos.	Player	To club	Transfer fee
15 May 2007	DF	(Tunisia) Hatem Trabelsi	(Saudi Arabia) Al-Hilal	Released
23 May 2007	DF	(France) Sylvain Distin	(England) Portsmouth	Free
14 June 2007	MF	(England) Joey Barton	(England) Newcastle United	£5.8M
4 July 2007	GK	(England) Nicky Weaver	(England) Charlton Athletic	Free
10 July 2007	MF	(England) Trevor Sinclair	(Wales) Cardiff City	Free
16 July 2007	DF	(England) Stephen Jordan	(England) Burnley	Free
31 Jan. 2008	MF	(France) Ousmane Dabo	(Italy) Lazio	Free
31 Jan. 2008	FW	(England) Ishmael Miller	(England) West Brom. Albion	£0.9M–£1.4M

==== Reserves & Academy ====
Exit date	Pos.	Player	To club	Transfer fee
15 May 2007	GK	(England) Laurence Matthewson	Released	
15 May 2007	MF	(England) Ashley Williams	Released	
4 July 2007	DF	(England) Nathan D'Laryea	(England) Rochdale	Free
9 Jan. 2008	MF	(Scotland) Marc Laird	(England) Millwall	Free

=== Loans in ===
==== First team ====
Start date	End date	Pos.	Player	From club
1 Jan. 2008	31 Dec. 2008	MF	(Mexico) Nery Castillo	(Ukraine) Shakhtar Donetsk

==== Reserves & Academy ====
Start date	End date	Pos.	Player	From club
31 Jan. 2008	30 June 2008	FW	(Italy) Filippo Mancini	(Italy) Inter Milan

=== Loans out ===
==== First team ====
Start date	End date	Pos.	Player	To club
15 Aug. 07	31 May 08	MF	(England) Ishmael Miller	(England) West Bromwich Albion
21 Aug. 07	11 Nov. 07	DF	(England) Matthew Mills	(England) Doncaster Rovers
31 Aug. 07	31 May 08	FW	(Italy) Bernardo Corradi	(Italy) Parma
31 Aug. 07	31 Dec. 07	FW	(Scotland) Paul Dickov	(England) Crystal Palace
31 Aug. 07	31 Dec. 07	DF	(England) Danny Mills	(England) Charlton Athletic
11 Oct. 07	10 Nov. 07	DF	(England) Shaleum Logan	(England) Grimsby Town
25 Oct. 07	24 Nov. 07	GK	(Denmark) Kasper Schmeichel	(Wales) Cardiff City
10 Nov. 07	19 Dec. 07	DF	(England) Shaleum Logan	(England) Scunthorpe United
21 Oct. 07	20 Dec. 07	FW	(Wales) Ched Evans	(England) Norwich City
4 Jan. 08	31 May 08	DF	(England) Danny Mills	(England) Derby County
10 Jan. 08	26 Feb. 08	FW	(Wales) Ched Evans	(England) Norwich City
11 Jan. 08	31 May 08	DF	(England) Matthew Mills	(England) Doncaster Rovers
23 Jan. 08	31 May 08	FW	(Italy) Rolando Bianchi	(Italy) Lazio
29 Jan. 08	31 May 08	FW	(Greece) Georgios Samaras	(Scotland) Celtic
31 Jan. 08	31 May 08	FW	(Scotland) Paul Dickov	(England) Blackpool
22 Feb. 08	14 Mar. 08	DF	(England) Shaleum Logan	(England) Stockport County
4 Mar. 08	31 May 08	MF	(Nigeria) Kelvin Etuhu	(England) Leicester City
13 Mar. 08	31 May 08	GK	(Denmark) Kasper Schmeichel	(England) Coventry City
24 Mar. 08	31 May 08	DF	(England) Shaleum Logan	(England) Stockport County

==== Reserves & Academy ====
Start date	End date	Pos.	Player	To club
8 Nov. 07	7 Dec. 07	MF	(Scotland) Marc Laird	(England) Port Vale
27 Feb. 08	30 June 08	FW	(Thailand) Teerasil Dangda	(Switzerland) Grasshoppers
27 Feb. 08	30 June 08	DF	(Thailand) Suree Sukha	(Switzerland) Grasshoppers
14 Apr. 08	30 June 08	DF	(Thailand) Kiatprawut Saiwaeo	(Belgium) Club Brugge
