= Nedum Onuoha =

English footballer

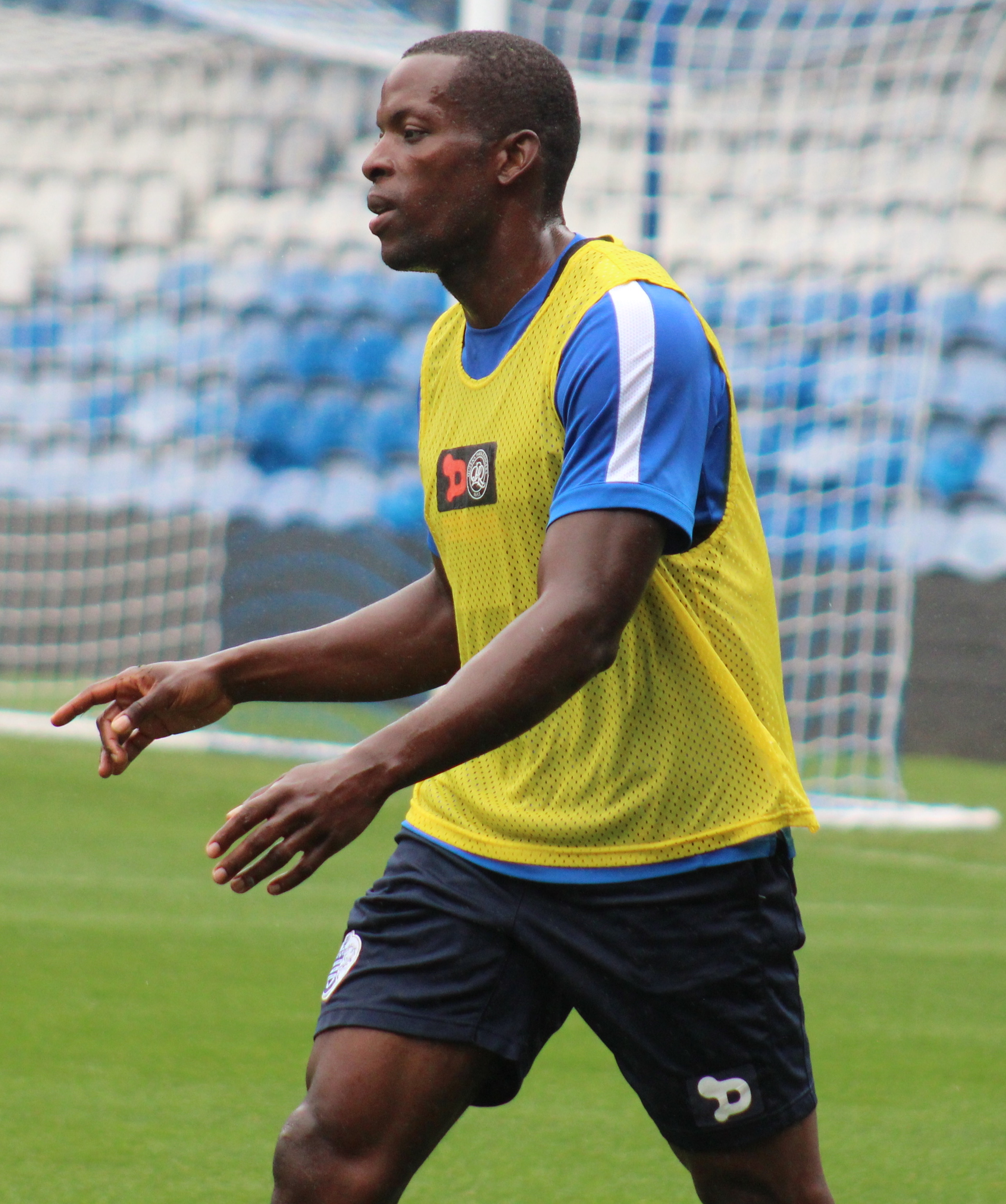
- Onuoha training with Queens Park Rangers in 2016

Personal information
- Full name: Chinedum Onuoha
- Date of birth: 12 November 1986 (age 39)
- Place of birth: Warri, Nigeria
- Height: 6 ft 0 in (1.83 m)
- Position: Defender

Youth career
- 1996–2004: Manchester City

Senior career*
Years	Team	Apps	(Gls)
2004–2012	Manchester City	95	(3)
2010–2011	→ Sunderland (loan)	31	(1)
2012–2018	Queens Park Rangers	207	(7)
2018–2020	Real Salt Lake	44	(1)
Total		377	(12)

International career
2005	England U20	1	(0)
2005–2009	England U21	20	(2)
Medal record
Men's football
Representing England
UEFA European Under-21 Championship
Runner-up	2009 Sweden
- * Club domestic league appearances and goals

Chinedum Onuoha (born 12 November 1986) is a former professional footballer and current television pundit. He also works for Manchester City as a community ambassador.

As a player he was a centre-back, but could also play at right-back or left-back. Onuoha came through the academy at Manchester City going on to make 95 appearances in the Premier League over an 8 year-spell with the club. He also spent time playing in the top flight for Sunderland and Queens Park Rangers. He was part of the QPR team that were defeated 3–2 by his former club Manchester City on the final day of the 2011–12 season, with City winning the title in the final seconds of the game. He later won promotion back to the Premier League with QPR via the 2013–14 play-offs. He later spent two seasons in Major League Soccer for Real Salt Lake. He was capped at England U20 and England U21 levels.

== Personal life ==
Born in Warri, Delta State, Nigeria, Onuoha was brought up in Manchester, England. He went to Nelson Street Primary School Miles Platting before becoming a pupil at the Hulme Grammar School, Oldham, where he achieved eight grade 'A's' and two 'B's' at GCSE. He then completed his studies at Xaverian College Manchester where he achieved three 'A' grades at A-level in Maths, Business Studies and IT. Onuoha revealed "he had a strict Nigerian upbringing and that school came first and if he did not study properly and successfully, he was forbidden by his mother and father from playing football or athletics".

An outstanding junior sprinter, aged 14 he finished in second place in the final of the 2001 English School's Athletics Association Junior 100 metres contest, clocking 11.09 seconds and beating former Great Britain sprinter Craig Pickering. However, Onuoha said about the record: "it was all just based on the fact I was doing summer training," He is also currently the co-national record holder for boys under 15 standing triple jump, in the Sports Hall events held annually throughout the UK. The record is held jointly with international long jumper Jonathan Moore.

He is known to have supported Manchester City as a boy and he attended the Division Two play-off final against Gillingham at Wembley in 1999. Onuoha's mother, Dr Anthonia Onuoha, who was his agent, developed cancer and made national headlines in September 2011 when an email exchange led to the club's CEO Garry Cook resigning from his role. The following November, Dr Anthonia Onuoha eventually succumbed to cancer. After his mother's death, he paid tribute to her, saying: "My mum always wanted me to do the best I could and out of respect for her I will carry on trying to do that. The rest of my career is dedicated to her memory. I want to carry on making her proud. She was a very special woman, and even when she was ill she never wanted me to stop playing."

Outside of football, Onuoha studied part-time to earn an accountancy degree at Manchester Metropolitan University. However, he said: "I studied accountancy, but that turned out to be one of the most boring years in my life." In April 2014, Onuoha became a father for the first time when his wife, Lucy Onuoha, gave birth to a daughter, Amaia.

In October 2021, Onuhoa returned to Manchester City to work for the City in the Community organisation.

In November 2021, it was announced that Onuoha would release an autobiography titled Kicking Back, which was co-written with Hugh Ferris. It was published in May 2022 by Biteback Publishing.

== Club career ==
=== Manchester City ===
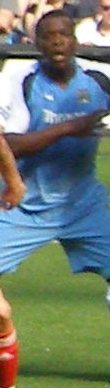
Onuoha playing for Manchester City in 2007.

Having started at the Independent Schools Football Association, Onuoha progressed through the age groups in Manchester City's youth academy since joining in 1996 at age ten and played regularly for club's reserves in the 2003–04 season. He had his first involvement with the Manchester City first team in the 2004–05 pre-season, playing in a friendly against Bury. Onuoha made his first team debut against Arsenal in the League Cup on 27 October 2004, at the age of 17. He made his Premier League debut as a substitute on 1 November 2004 at home to Norwich City. Though Onuoha's natural position is centre-half, manager Kevin Keegan initially played him at right back with the intention of improving his passing ability. He then made his first Premier League start, playing the whole game, in a 3–1 win over Portsmouth on 20 November 2004. After the match, Manager Keegan praised his performance. After spending two months on the sidelines with a hamstring injury, which he sustained in mid–January, Onuoha made his first appearances in two months, starting the match and gave away a goal before being substituted, in a 2–1 loss against Tottenham Hotspur on 19 March 2005. Despite this, he was involved in the club's remaining matches, playing in the right–back position, and kept three clean sheets between 20 April 2005 and 30 April 2005. For his performance, Onuoha signed a three–year contract with the club. At the end of the 2004–05 season, making eighteen appearances in all competitions in his debut season, he was awarded the club's young player of the year.

However, Onuoha missed the start of the 2005–06 season, due to a hamstring injury. His first appearance of the season came on 23 August 2005, coming on as a late substitute, in a 2–1 win over Sunderland. After being dropped from the first team in early–September, Onuoha returned against Doncaster Rovers in a League Cup match, where he was red carded for the first time in his career, after a collision with Rovers goalkeeper Andy Warrington. The red card was later rescinded however Manchester City went on to lose the game on penalties. Since returning to the first team, Onuoha continued to fight for his first team place, competing in the defensive starting line–up for the side. However, he soon suffered a groin injury that saw him sidelined for two months. While on the sidelines, Onuoha was awarded BBC North West Sports Personality of the Year Award for newcomer honour. It wasn't until on 12 December 2005 when he returned from injury, starting the whole game, in a 4–1 win over Birmingham City. Onuoha was featured in the next six matches since returning from injury. Amid to the first team, he was linked with a move to Liverpool but was happy to stay at the club. However, Onuoha damaged his knee ligament that kept him out for the rest of the 2005–06 season. He went on to make twelve appearances in the 2005–06 season.

At the start of the 2006–07 season, Onuoha continued to be sidelined, recovering from his knee ligament injury. It wasn't until on 18 November 2006 when he made his first appearance of the season, coming on as a late substitute, in a 3–1 win over Fulham. Onuoha then appeared in the next six matches before injuring his knee once again. He didn't make his return from injury until on 31 March 2007, starting the match, in a 1–0 win against Newcastle United. Following this, Onuoha established himself in the first team for the remaining matches of the season. At the end of the 2006–07 season, he made nineteen appearances in all competitions. Following this, Onuoha was rewarded with a new four-year contract.

In the opening game of the 2007–08 season, Onuoha started the season well when he set up the second goal in the game for Geovanni, in a 2–0 win over West Ham United. He captained the Manchester City side to a 2–1 victory over Bristol City in the League Cup second round. Over the season, Onuoha found himself, competing in the first team at the club's defence. After spending two months out of the first team, he made his return to the starting line–up, starting the whole game, in a 1–1 draw against Aston Villa on 22 December 2007. Onuoha continued to remain in the club's first team despite suffering injuries along the way. He then scored his first goal for City at home against Tottenham Hotspur on 16 March 2008 in a 2–1 win. On 5 April 2008, Onuoha dislocated his shoulder in a game against Chelsea and was ruled out for the remainder of the 2007–08 season following surgery. At the end of the season, he went on to make twenty–one appearances and scoring once in all competitions.

In the 2008–09 season, Onuoha made his UEFA Cup debut, starting and playing the whole game, in a 2–0 win over EB/Streymur in the first leg of the UEFA Cup qualifying round. However, the start of the 2008–09 season saw Onuoha sidelined, who suffered a knee injury while on international duty. It wasn't until on 20 October 2008 when he made his return from injury, coming on as a substitute for Micah Richards in the 58th minute, in a 2–2 draw against Newcastle United. Soon after, Onuoha found himself in the substitute bench for the next two months. But after City's 3–0 defeat to Nottingham Forest in the FA Cup, he started every single game until the end of the season, forming an effective partnership with Richard Dunne in the centre of defence. He then scored his first goal of the season in the first leg of the UEFA Cup Round, in a 2–2 draw against Copenhagen and helped the side go through to the next round after winning 2–1 in the second leg. Two months later on 19 April 2009, Onuoha scored his second goal of the season, in a 4–2 win over West Brom. Two weeks later on 2 May 2009, he set up the club's opening goal of the game, in a 3–1 win over Blackburn Rovers. For his performance, he was named Manchester City's Thomas Cook Player of the Month on two occasions for March and May. At the end of the 2008–09 season, Onuoha went on to make thirty appearances and scoring two times in all competitions. Following this, Onuoha agreed to a new five-year deal with Manchester City on 29 July 2009. During the 2008–09 season, he said about the club's new ownership, saying: "The takeover was a shock in itself, it was insane. Out of nowhere, we were getting called the richest club in football. It was a shock not just to the players, but the whole football world, it was such a big statement at that time."

In the 2009–10 season, Onuoha found himself out of the first team, due to being on the substitute bench over his own injury concern. It wasn't until on 21 November 2009 when he made his first appearance of the season, coming on as a substitute in the second half, in a 2–2 draw against Liverpool. However, his return was short–lived when Onuoha suffered a groin injury that kept him out throughout December. Onuoha didn't make return to the first team until on 24 January 2010 against Scunthorpe United in the fourth round of the FA Cup, as they won 4–2. Three months later on 11 April 2010, Onuoha played a role when he set up a goal for Carlos Tevez and scored from a solo run, as Manchester City won 5–1 against Birmingham City. Over the season, he found himself on the substitute bench for the remaining matches, due to competition in the club's defence. At the end of the 2009–10 season, Onuoha went on to make seventeen appearances and scoring two times in all competitions. Following this, he criticised Manager Roberto Mancini over his decision-making he made at the club.

After returning from a loan spell at Sunderland, Onuoha was linked with a move away from Manchester City, as various Premier League clubs made bids for him ahead of the 2011–12 season. It came after when he was told by the club that he would need to look for a new club. But no bid was accepted and he stayed at Manchester City. After being dropped from the club's pre–season tour, he announced his intention to fight for his first team place at Manchester City in the 2011–12 season. However, his first team opportunities at Manchester City were limited as Manager Mancini said: Onuoha will stay with us because he is homegrown but he knows it is difficult for him to play often." But he made his first appearance of the season, starting the whole game, in a 2–0 win over Birmingham City in the third round of the League Cup. In January 2012, Onuoha continued to be linked a move away from the club, as Queens Park Rangers made a bid for him. After the bid was accepted, the agreement between Manchester City and Queens Park Rangers was made for Onuoha on 19 January 2012. By the time he departed Manchester City that season, he had made three appearances for the side. Local newspaper, Manchester Evening News, praised Onuoha "as a true professional".

==== Sunderland (loan) ====
It was announced on 12 August 2010 that Onuoha had joined Sunderland, then in the Premier League, on a season-long loan. Upon joining the club, Manager Steve Bruce said about Onuoha: "What do I like about Nedum? He's young, hungry and desperate to do well. He wants to play every week. He's quick, big, strong and powerful – all the things the modern game demands of a player. These days the defenders are as quick as the forwards and the added attraction is that Nedum can play right across the back four. I'm very pleased indeed to have him here."

He made his Sunderland début on 14 August against Birmingham City at the Stadium of Light. Since joining the club, Onuoha quickly established himself in the starting eleven, playing in the midfield position. He quickly made an impact for the side and impressed in a number of matches. Onuoha then set up a goal for Darren Bent, who scored the second goal of the game, in a 2–2 draw against Liverpool on 25 September 2010. He scored his first goal as the result of a brilliant dribble around three Chelsea defenders for Sunderland in a 3–0 win against Chelsea at Stamford Bridge on 14 November 2010. Onuoha was involved in the first team in the first half of the season until he suffered a hamstring injury in late–December and missed three matches. He made his return from injury, starting the match, in a 1–1 draw against local rivals, Newcastle United on 16 January 2011. However, Onuoha's return was short–lived when he suffered a calf injury and was sidelined for months. It wasn't until on 9 April 2011 when Onuoha returned from injury, starting the whole game, in a 3–2 loss against West Brom. Following this, he regained his first team place once again for the rest of the season and helped the side avoid relegation, finishing tenth place. At the end of the 2010–11 season, Onuoha went on to make thirty–two appearances and scoring once in all competitions. Following this, the club decided against signing him on a permanent basis despite Manager Bruce keen on signing him earlier.

=== Queens Park Rangers ===
On 26 January 2012, Onuoha agreed to a four-and-a-half-year deal with Premier League side Queens Park Rangers, reuniting him with his former manager Mark Hughes.

Onuoha made his Queens Park Rangers debut, playing the whole game, in a 2–2 draw against Aston Villa on 2 February 2012. He quickly became a first team regular for the rest of the season, playing in either the right–back or centre–back position. However, Queens Park Rangers found themselves in the relegation zone and he had to help in the fight to retain their Premier League status for the next season. Amid the relegation battle, Onuoha set up a goal for Djibril Cissé to score a late consolation, as Queens Park Rangers lost 6–1 to local rivals, Chelsea on 29 April 2012. Ahead of the final day of the season, with QPR requiring at least a draw in their match away at his former club, Manchester City or for Bolton Wanderers not to win in order to guarantee Premier League safety on 13 May 2012, Onuoha said about the match that he would want to see his former club, Manchester City win the Premier League and Queens Park Rangers stay up in the Premier League. In the last game of the season, he played the whole game, as Manchester City beat Queens Park Rangers 3–2, but Bolton's failure to beat Stoke City meant that QPR survived in the Premier League, which Onuoha successfully predicted. During the 2011–12 season Onuoha had made fourteen appearances for the side.

At the start of the 2012–13 season, Onuoha retained his first team place, playing in either the right–back or centre–back position. Over the course of the season, he found himself out of the first team, due to being given compassionate leave following his mother's cancer, as well as his own injury. Onuoha didn't make his return to the first team until 15 December 2012 against local rivals Fulham. He helped QPR beat them 2–1, earning their first league win of the season. He then helped the side earn four clean sheets throughout January against Chelsea, Tottenham Hotspur, West Bromwich Albion and Manchester City. However, Queens Park Rangers were eventually relegated to the Championship following a 0–0 draw against Reading on 28 April 2013. At the end of the 2012–13 season, after 26 appearances in all competitions, Onuoha said he would fight for his first team place under the management of Harry Redknapp. He also reflected about the 2012–13 season in an interview with The Daily Telegraph.

Onuoha scored his first goal for the club on 3 August 2013, against Sheffield Wednesday, in the opening fixture of the 2013–14 season. He then quickly regained his first team place, playing in the centre–back position. He helped the side keep four clean sheets through August to mid–September. However, during a 1–0 win over Brighton & Hove Albion on 18 September 2013, Onuoha suffered a hamstring injury and was sidelined for two months. It wasn't until on 9 November 2013 that he made his return from injury, coming on as a second-half substitute, in a 1–1 draw against Reading. However, his return was short–lived when Onuoha was sidelined once again with a hamstring injury. He made his return three weeks later on 14 December 2013, coming on as a second-half substitute, in a 2–0 win over Blackpool. After returning, Onuoha found himself in and out of the first team for the next two months, as he was placed on the substitute bench in a number of matches, due to Richard Dunne and Clint Hill being preferred as the first choice centre–backs, before returning to the starting eleven permanently for the remaining matches of the 2013–14 season. This continued despite suffering from injuries along the way. Onuoha then scored on his return from injury, in a 5–2 win over Nottingham Forest on 12 April 2014. In the Championship play-offs, Onuoha played in both legs against Wigan Athletic, as they won 2–1 on aggregate. He was a member of the Queens Park Rangers side which won the 2014 Championship play-off final 1–0 against Derby County on 24 May 2014 at Wembley Stadium. At the end of the 2013–14 season, Onuoha went on to make thirty–one appearances, scoring two times in all competitions.

At the start of the 2014–15 season, however, Onuoha found himself out of the first team and placed on the substitute bench due to new signings made over the summer. His first appearance of the season came on 24 August 2014, coming on as a second-half substitute, in a 4–0 loss against Tottenham Hotspur. Onuoha scored an own goal against West Ham United on 5 October 2014 when opposition player "Stewart Downing's corner struck the knee of Onuoha, standing on the edge of the six-yard area, and rolled in", as Queens Park Rangers lost 2–0. In a follow–up match against Liverpool, he suffered a hamstring injury and had to be substituted, resulting him being out for several weeks. It wasn't until on 22 November 2014 when Onuoha made his return to the first team from injury, starting the whole game, in a 1–0 loss against Newcastle United. Onuoha found himself in and out of the first team throughout the season, as he was placed on the substitute bench in a number of matches. During a 2–1 loss against Arsenal on 26 December 2014, Onuoha was head-butted by opposition player, Olivier Giroud, which resulted in his sending off in the 53rd minute; despite this, he continued playing for the rest of the match. By February, Onuoha suffered a hamstring injury that saw him out throughout February. It wasn't until on 4 March 2015 when Onuoha made his return from injury, starting the match against Arsenal but during the match, he clashed with teammate Steven Caulker, resulting in his substitution at half time, as Queens Park Rangers lost 2–1. Onuoha was then sent–off for a second bookable, in a 2–1 loss against Liverpool on 2 May 2015. In a follow–up match against Manchester City, they lost 6–0, resulting in their relegation to the Championship for the second time. At the end of the 2014–15 season, he went on to make twenty–five appearances in all competitions.

Ahead of the 2015–16 season, Onuoha was linked with a move away from Queens Park Rangers, with Premier League clubs interested but no move was ever made. Amid the transfer speculation, Onuoha was appointed club captain, succeeding Joey Barton, who had left over the summer. His first match as captain came in the opening game of the season, as Queens Park Rangers lost 2–0 against Charlton Athletic. In a follow–up match against Yeovil Town in the first round of the League Cup, he scored his first goal of the season, in what was his 100th appearance, in a 3–0 win. On 2 September 2015, Onuoha signed a contract extension with the club, keeping him until 2018. Fourteen days later on 16 September 2015, he scored his second goal of the season, in a 2–2 draw against Blackburn Rovers Onuoha continued to establish himself in the starting eleven for the side and rotate in either right–back and centre–back position, as well as, continuing his duties as captain. By October, his leadership received criticism as the club shared the Championship's worst goals record with Bristol City but received a vote of confidence as captain by Manager Chris Ramsey. But the results soon improved throughout the rest of the 2015–16 season. At one point, Onuoha helped the side keep three clean sheets between 28 November 2015 and 12 December 2015. During this, he scored again, in a 1–0 win over Reading on 3 December 2015. Onuoha guided Queens Park Rangers to a 12th-place finish in their first season back in the second tier. At the end of the 2015–16 season, Onuoha was ever-present in Queens Park Rangers matches, as he went on to make 48 appearances and scoring two times in all competitions.

The 2016–17 season saw Onuoha continuing to cement his captaincy, as well as his place in the starting eleven, rotating between right–back and centre–back positions. He started the 2016–17 season well when he scored the opener and set up the third goal in a 3–1 win over Leeds United in the opening game of the season. However, against Preston North End on 20 August 2016, Onuoha scored an own goal to give the opposition side their second goal, as Queens Park Rangers lost 2–0. The following match saw him score his second goal of the season as the side won 1–0 against Wigan Athletic. However, in a 3–0 loss against Brighton & Hove Albion on 27 December 2016, Onuoha was sent off for a professional foul in the 56th minute. After serving a one match suspension, he returned to the first team, coming on as a substitute in the second half, and set up a goal for Paweł Wszołek, who scored the winning goal, in a 2–1 win over Ipswich Town on 2 January 2017. His performance attracted interests from Premier League strugglers Sunderland, but he stayed at the club. Over the season, his performance had been a subject of criticism, due to "his inability with the ball at his feet" and leadership. This led some Queens Park Rangers' supporters to call for Onuoha to be dropped from the first team against Rotherham United on 18 March 2017, but he proved them wrong when he scored the third goal of the season in a 5–1 win. Onuoha said at the start of the season that the club's objective was to challenge for promotion. But poor results throughout the season saw them finish eighteen place in the league. Despite this, both Onuoha and Grant Hall were praised by new signing Joel Lynch for their improvement in defence throughout the 2016–17 season, as well as, "pushing each other on to greater heights in order to stay in the team." Although he missed two matches during the 2016–17 season, Onuoha went on to make forty–seven appearances, scoring three times in all competitions. During the season, he was awarded the PFA Community Champion Award.

The 2017–18 season saw Onuoha retain his captaincy as well as his place in the starting eleven for the side, playing in the centre–back position for most of the season. His 200th appearance for the club came on 9 September 2017, playing the whole game, in a 2–1 win over Ipswich Town. However, in a follow–up match against Millwall, Onuoha suffered a hamstring injury and was substituted at half time, as the game finished 2–2. Shortly after, it was announced that Onuoha was out for three months. While on the sidelines, the club opened talks with him over a new contract. It wasn't until on 9 December 2017 that Onuoha made his return from injury, playing the whole game in a 3–1 loss against Leeds United. Since his return to the first team, he regained his first team place as well as the captaincy. During a 4–0 loss against Hull City on 7 April 2018, Onuoha was sent–off in the last minute of the game for a professional foul on Markus Henriksen; and served a three match suspension. Despite being absent that saw him miss seventeen matches during the 2017–18 season, Onuoha helped the side finish sixteen place in the league. Having made 36 appearances in the 2017–18 season, it was announced on 27 April 2018, it was announced that Onuoha would be leaving the club at the end of the 2017–18 season, bringing an end to a six-and-a-half-year stay. By the time of his departure, he was awarded the Ray Jones Players' Player of the Year, voted for by his team-mates.

=== Real Salt Lake ===
Onuoha joined Major League Soccer's Real Salt Lake on 14 September 2018. He later explained the move, saying: "I have always been someone that wanted to go and experience something a bit different."

Onuoha made his Real Salt Lake debut, coming on as a late substitute, in a 1–1 draw against Sporting Kansas City on 30 September 2018. In his second appearance for the club, he then set up a goal for Damir Kreilach to score the club's fourth goal of the game, in a 4–1 win over New England Revolution on 18 October 2018. Having been initially placed on the substitute, Onuoha was featured in the three matches in the MLS Cup Playoffs, as they lost Sporting Kansas City 5–3 on aggregate. At the end of the 2018 season, he went on to make five appearances for the side.

In the 2019 season, Onuoha established himself in the starting eleven, playing in the centre–back position. During a 2–1 against LA Galaxy on 29 April 2019, he was involved in altercation with LA Galaxy's striker Zlatan Ibrahimović; leading Onuoha accusing Ibrahimovic of foul play and threats to injure him during a game, calling him "arrogant", "disrespectful", and "a complete thug". During a 1–0 win over Columbus Crew on 4 July 2019, he suffered a thigh injury in the 73rd minute and was substituted as a result. As a result, Onuoha was sidelined for a month. It wasn't until on 10 August 2019 when Onuoha made his return from injury, coming on as a substitute in the 76th minute, in a 2–1 win over Sporting Kansas City. After being dropped for one match, he scored his first goal for the club on 26 September 2019, in a 2–1 loss against LA Galaxy. Onuoha helped the side qualify for the MLS Cup Playoffs but lost 2–0 against Seattle Sounders FC on 24 October 2019. At the end of the 2019 season, he went on to make thirty appearances and scoring once in all competitions.

Onuoha announced his retirement from playing professional football following Salt Lake's 2020 season.

In August 2019, Onuoha began hosting a podcast entitled Kickback with Nedum.

== International career ==
Onuoha was eligible to play for England (having received British citizenship at seven years old) and Nigeria (the country in which he was born). He was invited by Nigeria manager Berti Vogts to represent Nigeria at the 2008 Africa Cup of Nations; however, Onuoha turned down the opportunity because his club, Manchester City, had recently had a change of manager and he did not want to lose his place in the team by being absent on international duty for a month. Onuoha stated in 2022 that he regretted this choice; he ended up never playing senior international football.

=== England youth team ===
Having previously played for England U20, Onuoha was then a regular in the England U-21 side, making his debut on 12 October 2005.

He was part of the squad participating in the 2007 European Under 21s Championship in the Netherlands. Onuoha started the tournament well when he helped the side keep a clean sheet, in a 0–0 draw against Czech Republic U21. During the Championships, Onuoha was subjected to racist abuse from Serbian fans, but received praise for maintaining his conduct amid provocation. Following the match, he describe the racial abuse he received as "horrific". He was a regular at centre back, partnering Steven Taylor. During the semi-final against the Netherlands, he limped off with an injury and England were down to ten men as all three of the permitted substitutions had been made; they lost 13–12 on penalties.

Three months later on 7 September 2007, Onuoha scored his first England U21 goal, in a 3–0 win over Montenegro U21. He then captained the England Under-21 team for the first time in a 0–0 draw with Poland Under-21s. In the summer of 2009, he took part in the European Championships, which proved to be his last time he played his last match for the U-21's. Onuoha played in the centre–back position, where he helped England U21 keep a clean sheet, in a 2–0 win over Spain U21 on 18 June 2009. He scored in a 3–3 draw against Sweden in the semi-finals of the 2009 Under-21 European Championship and helped them reach the final after winning 5–4 on penalties. However, Onuoha started in defence for England in the 4–0 defeat to Germany U21 in the final of the Under-21 Championships.

=== Post-England youth team career ===
In March 2007, Onuoha received an international call-up from Nigeria, but announced that he would prefer to represent England at full international level. However, he later admitted that he would have played at the 2010 FIFA World Cup for Nigeria if he had been called up. "It is a tough call. I would love to play for England," he said in November 2009. "But I also get a certain feeling when I see Nigeria play. It is not the best time to make such a big decision, so for now I am not making one." By 2016, Onuoha commented that he has given up hopes of earning a call-up from Nigeria.

== Career statistics ==
Appearances and goals by club, season and competition
Club	Season	League			National cup		League cup		Other		Total	
Club	Season	Division	Apps	Goals	Apps	Goals	Apps	Goals	Apps	Goals	Apps	Goals
Manchester City	2004–05	Premier League	17	0	0	0	1	0	—		18	0
Manchester City	2005–06	Premier League	10	0	1	0	1	0	—		12	0
Manchester City	2006–07	Premier League	18	0	1	0	0	0	—		19	0
Manchester City	2007–08	Premier League	16	1	2	0	3	0	—		21	1
Manchester City	2008–09	Premier League	23	1	0	0	0	0	7 (Note: Appearances in UEFA Cup)	1	30	2
Manchester City	2009–10	Premier League	10	1	2	1	1	0	—		13	2
Manchester City	2011–12	Premier League	1	0	0	0	2	0	0	0	3	0
Manchester City	Total		95	3	6	1	8	0	7	1	116	5
Sunderland (loan)	2010–11	Premier League	31	1	0	0	1	0	—		32	1
Queens Park Rangers	2011–12	Premier League	16	0	0	0	—		—		16	0
Queens Park Rangers	2012–13	Premier League	23	0	2	0	1	0	—		26	0
Queens Park Rangers	2013–14	Championship	26	2	1	0	1	0	3 (Note: Appearances in Championship play-offs)	0	31	2
Queens Park Rangers	2014–15	Premier League	23	0	1	0	1	0	—		25	0
Queens Park Rangers	2015–16	Championship	46	2	1	0	1	1	—		48	3
Queens Park Rangers	2016–17	Championship	44	3	1	0	2	0	—		47	3
Queens Park Rangers	2017–18	Championship	29	0	1	0	1	0	—		31	0
Queens Park Rangers	Total		207	7	7	0	7	1	3	0	224	8
Real Salt Lake	2018	MLS	2	0	3	0	—		—		2	0
Real Salt Lake	2019	MLS	27	1	3	0	1 (Note: Appearances in U.S. Open Cup)	0	—		31	1
Real Salt Lake	2020	MLS	15	0	2	0	—		—		17	0
Real Salt Lake	Total		44	1	8 (Note: Appearances in MLS Cup playoffs)	0	1	0	—		53	1
Career total			377	12	21	1	17	1	10	1	427	15

== Honours ==
Queens Park Rangers

- Football League Championship play-offs: 2014

England U21

- UEFA European Under-21 Championship runner-up: 2009

Sporting positions
Preceded by Joey Barton	Queens Park Rangers captain 2015–2018	Incumbent
