= 2009 Vodacom Challenge =

Tournament details
- Teams: 3

Final positions
- Champions: Kaizer Chiefs
- Runners-up: Manchester City

Tournament statistics
- Matches played: 4

The 2009 Vodacom Challenge was a friendly soccer tournament played in South Africa between 18 July and 25 July 2009, and contested by South African clubs Orlando Pirates and Kaizer Chiefs, and English club Manchester City. Kaizer Chiefs beat Manchester City 1–0 in the final to claim the title.

== Venues ==
Four cities served as the venues for the 2009 Vodacom Challenge.

Polokwane	Durban	Port Elizabeth	Pretoria
Old Peter Mokaba Stadium	Kings Park Stadium	Nelson Mandela Bay Stadium	Loftus Versfeld Stadium
Capacity: 15,000	Capacity: 55,000	Capacity: 48,000	Capacity: 51,762

== Manchester City squad ==
Premier League team Manchester City announced on 15 July 2009 that they would be bringing a full-strength squad to South Africa.

Note: Flags indicate national team as defined under FIFA eligibility rules; some limited exceptions apply. Players may hold more than one non-FIFA nationality.

No.	Pos.	Nation	Player
1	GK	IRL	Shay Given
2	DF	ENG	Micah Richards
3	DF	ENG	Wayne Bridge
4	DF	ENG	Nedum Onuoha
6	MF	ENG	Michael Johnson
7	MF	IRL	Stephen Ireland
8	MF	ENG	Shaun Wright-Phillips
9	FW	BUL	Valeri Bojinov
10	FW	BRA	Robinho *
11	MF	BRA	Elano *
12	GK	ENG	Stuart Taylor
14	FW	PAR	Roque Santa Cruz
15	DF	ESP	Javier Garrido
16	GK	DEN	Kasper Schmeichel
17	MF	BUL	Martin Petrov

No.	Pos.	Nation	Player
18	MF	ENG	Gareth Barry
20	FW	ECU	Felipe Caicedo
22	DF	IRL	Richard Dunne (captain)
24	FW	WAL	Ched Evans
25	FW	TOG	Emmanuel Adebayor *
26	DF	ISR	Tal Ben Haim
27	FW	ZIM	Benjani Mwaruwari
29	MF	NGA	Kelvin Etuhu
30	DF	ENG	Shaleum Logan
32	FW	ARG	Carlos Tevez
33	MF	BEL	Vincent Kompany
34	MF	NED	Nigel de Jong
39	FW	WAL	Craig Bellamy
40	MF	SVK	Vladimír Weiss

- * Only available for the final on July 25.

== Matches ==
=== First round ===
18 July 2009
15:00

Orlando Pirates (South Africa)	2–0	(England) Manchester City
Twala 41' (pen.); Mongalo 56'	Report

Old Peter Mokaba Stadium, Polokwane
Attendance: 26,000

GK	16	Moneed Josephs
RB	38	Zvenyika Makonese
CB	3	Kiaku		(substituted off) 46'
CB	28	Rooi Mahamutsa
LB	32	Lucas Thwala
RM	14	Lucky Lekgwathi
CM	36	Oupa Manyisa		(substituted off) 48'
CM	5	Dikgang Mabalane
LM	42	Bennet Chenene		(substituted off) 49'
CF	25	Rudzani Ramudzuli		(substituted off) 46'
CF	40	Siphelele Promise Mthembu		(substituted off) 64'
Substitutes:
GK	1	Senzo Meyiwa
DF	17	Lehlohonolo Seema
MF	24	Joseph Makhanya
MF	7	Joseph Kamwendo		(substituted on) 49'
MF	12	Thembile Kanono	(yellow card) 90'	(substituted on) 46'
FW	15	Irvin Mhlambi		(substituted on) 46'
MF	9	Destin Nakica
MF	20	Reason Chiloane		(substituted on) 64'
FW	8	Phenyo Mogale		(substituted on) 48'
Manager:
(Netherlands) Ruud Krol

GK	12	Stuart Taylor
RB	5	Pablo Zabaleta
CB	26	Tal Ben Haim
CB	15	Javier Garrido
LB	40	Vladimír Weiss
RM	7	Stephen Ireland		(substituted off) 69'
CM	41	Ben Mee
CM	6	Michael Johnson
LM	17	Martin Petrov	(yellow card) 45'
CF	9	Valeri Bojinov		(substituted off) 69'
CF	39	Craig Bellamy	(yellow card) 45'	(substituted off) 47'
Substitutions:
GK	37	Shay Given
DF	50	Ryan McGivern
MF	34	Nigel de Jong		(substituted on) 69'
FW	20	Felipe Caicedo		(substituted on) 69'
MF	8	Shaun Wright-Phillips
MF	18	Gareth Barry
FW	27	Benjani Mwaruwari		(substituted on) 47'
MF	36	Javan Vidal
Manager:
(Wales) Mark Hughes

21 July 2009
20:15

Kaizer Chiefs (South Africa)	0–1	(England) Manchester City
	Report	Ireland 45'

Kings Park Stadium, Durban
Attendance: 45,000

GK	32	Itumeleng Khune
RB	20	Tshifiwa Mmbooi
CB	31	Punch Masenamela
CB	13	Valery Nahayo	(substituted off) 86'
LB	3	Langu Sweswe
RM	8	Tinashe Nengomasha
CM	22	Mandla Masango	(substituted off) 69'
CM	6	Reneilwe Letsholonyane	(substituted off) 65'
LM	24	David Mathebula
CF	11	Abia Nale	(substituted off) 54'
CF	7	Kaizer Motaung Junior
Substitutes:
GK	16	Thela Ngobeni
DF	4	Elliot Rooi
DF	28	Tlou Molekwane
DF	29	Zhiamu Jambo
DF	77	José Torrealba
MF	9	Josta Dladla	(substituted on) 65'
MF	17	George Lebese
MF	18	Arthur Zwane
MF	27	Gerald Sibeko
FW	10	Mthokozisi Yende	(substituted on) 54'
FW	19	Nkosinathi Nhleko
FW	21	Knowledge Musona	(substituted on) 69'
FW	23	Tshepo Bulu
GK	30	Abel Metsimetsi
MF	33	Jeffrey Ntuka	(substituted on) 86'
Manager:
(Serbia) Vladimir Vermezović

GK	12	Stuart Taylor
RB	5	Pablo Zabaleta
CB	41	Ben Mee
CB	50	Ryan McGivern
LB	3	Wayne Bridge		(substituted off) 71'
RM	8	Shaun Wright-Phillips		(substituted off) 82'
CM	34	Nigel de Jong
CM	18	Gareth Barry	(yellow card) 54'	(substituted off) 63'
LM	29	Kelvin Etuhu
CF	7	Stephen Ireland		(substituted off) 46'
CF	20	Felipe Caicedo	(yellow card) 44'	(substituted off) 46'
Substitutions:
GK	37	Shay Given
MF	36	Javan Vidal		(substituted on) 63'
DF	15	Javier Garrido		(substituted on) 71'
MF	17	Martin Petrov		(substituted on) 46'
MF	40	Vladimír Weiss		(substituted on) 82'
FW	27	Benjani Mwaruwari		(substituted on) 46'	(substituted off) 90'
FW	9	Valeri Bojinov			(substituted on) 90'
Manager:
(Wales) Mark Hughes

=== Soweto derby ===
23 July 2009
20:15

Orlando Pirates (South Africa)	1–1	(South Africa) Kaizer Chiefs
Kamwendo 30'		Dladla 10'
Penalties
Twala (penalty scored); Chenene (penalty missed); Mashego (penalty scored); Lekgwathi (penalty missed); Modise (penalty scored); Mabalane (penalty missed); Mhlongo (penalty missed)	3–4	(penalty scored) Ltuka; (penalty missed) Torrealba; (penalty missed) Zwane; (penalty scored) Dladla; (penalty scored) Nale; (penalty missed) Sibeko; (penalty scored) Rooi

Nelson Mandela Bay Stadium, Port Elizabeth
Attendance: 30,000

GK	16	Moneed Josephs
RB	28	Rooi Mahamutsa
CB	19	Innocent Mdledle
CB	32	Lucas Thwala
LB	17	Lehlohonolo Seema
RM	5	Dikgang Mabalane
CM	7	Joseph Kamwendo		(substituted off) 75'
CM	3	Kiaku	(yellow card) 34'	(substituted off) 56'
LM	21	Katlego Mashego		(substituted off) 80'
CF	15	Irvin Mhlambi		(substituted off) 62'
CF	12	Phenyo Mogale
Substitutes:
GK	29	Robert Modiadie
MF	14	Lucky Lekgwathi
MF	2	Benson Mhlongo		(substituted on) 56'
DF	38	Zvenyika Makonese
MF	9	Destin Nakica
MF	36	Oupa Manyisa		(substituted on) 75'
MF	11	Teko Modise		(substituted on) 62'
MF	24	Joseph Makhanya
MF	30	Lebogang Mothibantwa
MF	42	Bennet Chenene		(substituted on) 80'
MF	8	Andile Jali
MF	40	Siphelele Promise Mthembu
Manager:
(Netherlands) Ruud Krol

GK	32	Itumeleng Khune
RB	31	Punch Masenamela
CB	28	Lawrence Molekwane
CB	3	Langu Sweswe	(substituted off) 74'
LB	33	Jeffrey Ntuka
RM	6	Reneilwe Letsholonyane	(substituted off) 53'
CM	22	Mandla Masango	(substituted off) 88'
CM	24	David Mathebula
LM	9	Josta Dladla
CF	11	Abia Nale
CF	21	Knowledge Musona	(substituted off) 60'
Substitutes:
GK	16	Thela Ngobeni
DF	20	Tshifiwa Mmbooi
DF	29	Zhiamu Jambo
DF	4	Elliot Rooi	(substituted on) 74'
MF	8	Tinashe Nengomasha
MF	27	Gerald Sibeko	(substituted on) 53'
MF	17	George Lebese
MF	18	Arthur Zwane	(substituted on) 88'
FW	10	Mthokozisi Yende
FW	23	Tshepo Bulu
FW	77	José Torrealba	(substituted on) 60'
FW	19	Nkosinathi Nhleko
GK	30	Abel Metsimetsi
Manager:
(Serbia) Vladimir Vermezović

=== Final ===
25 July 2009
15:00

Kaizer Chiefs (South Africa)	1–0	(England) Manchester City
Ntuka 42'	Report

Loftus Versfeld Stadium, Pretoria
Attendance: 40,000
