= 2009–10 Manchester City F.C. season =

English football club season

Manchester City
2009–10 season
- Owner: Abu Dhabi United Group
- Chairman: Khaldoon Al Mubarak
- Manager: Mark Hughes (until 19 December); Roberto Mancini (from 19 December)
- Stadium: City of Manchester Stadium
- Premier League: 5th
- FA Cup: Fifth round
- League Cup: Semi-finals
- Top goalscorer: League: Carlos Tevez (23); All: Carlos Tevez (29)
- Highest home attendance: 45,356 vs Tottenham Hotspur (5 May 2010)
- Lowest home attendance: 37,876 vs Fulham (23 September 2009)
- Average home league attendance: 44,870
Home colours	Away colours	Third colours

The 2009–10 season was Manchester City Football Club's eighth consecutive season playing in the Premier League, the top division of English football, and its thirteenth season since the Premier League was first created with Manchester City as one of its original 22 founding member clubs. Overall, it is the team's 118th season playing in a division of English football, most of which have been spent in the top flight. The club started the season under the management of Mark Hughes who was sacked in mid-December after the team drew seven consecutive matches in the Premier League. He was replaced by the Italian manager Roberto Mancini.

== Season review ==
New manager Roberto Mancini began the season with only five months in the job at Eastlands.

With a prolific 29 goals in his first season at the club, Carlos Tevez was widely regarded as the club's best and most important player this season. The previous season's fan's favourite and top scorer, Robinho, was less successful, and in January he was loaned out to Brazilian club Santos for the remainder of the season only serving to emphasise the magnitude of his failure to deliver on the pitch anything remotely comparable to what he had already received in his bank account.

In fact, Manchester City earned itself the distinction of being the only team to do the "league double" over the team that ultimately achieved the "league and cup double" this season.

== Kit ==
Supplier: Umbro / Sponsor: Etihad Airways

Home	Home alt.	Away	Away alt.	Third	Goalkeeper 1	Goalkeeper 2

=== Kit information ===
For the 2009–10 season, the shirt sponsor for all of the club's kits was Etihad Airways, which replaced the previous season's sponsor, Thomas Cook. There was also a change in the supplier of those kits for this season, with Nike-owned Umbro replacing the previous season's supplier, Le Coq Sportif. As a result of the switch from its prior French kit supplier to the Greater Manchester-based Umbro, all of the club's previous season's team and goalkeeper kits were essentially replaced with new ones for this season.

The overall sky blue colour of the first team kit was retained but the style and trim of this strip was significantly changed. Completely new away and third team kits were introduced, while a new all-green goalkeeper strip replaced the previous season's gold and black strip as the primary one for use by the goalkeepers, with a newly styled and trimmed variant of the old gold and black strip which became the secondary strip for use by the goalkeepers in away fixtures.

The new all-black away team kit came with gold vertical shoulder trim on the front that enabled the kit to be colour-coordinated with the gold and black goalkeeper strip, although it was sometimes also used with the all-green goalkeeper strip. This gold and black colour scheme was, according to its designer David Blanch, intended to be symbolic of the globe covered with bees (representing the world, to all parts of which the goods of the city were exported) that was featured on the city of Manchester coat of arms. That was because the Manchester City teams in the past have established the unique tradition of always wearing this crest on their shirts when playing at Wembley (or in a major cup final elsewhere) as a symbol of their pride in representing the city of Manchester at a major sporting event. In heraldic terms, the bee was symbolic of a hive of industry, and even today the Manchester bee was often used all by itself as a shorthand emblem for the city of Manchester.

The red and black diagonal sash across the white shirts of the new third team kit was intended as a nostalgic re-mastering of the original sashed strip worn by the City team in the 1970s, while that original design had, in its turn, been a nod back at the classic red and black striped shirts with black shorts that had originally been introduced by coach Malcolm Allison in imitation of Milan's strip, and which was frequently worn in its cup ties by the successful trophy-winning City team of the late 1960s and early 1970s.

== Historical league performance ==
Prior to this season, the history of Manchester City's performance in the English football league hierarchy since the creation of the Premier League in 1992 is summarised by the following timeline chart – which commences with the last season (1991–92) of the old Football League First Division (from which the Premier League was formed).

== Friendly games ==
=== Pre-season ===
11 July 2009	1860 München	1–1	Manchester City	Rottach-Egern, Germany
	Ludwig 30'	Report & video	60' Bojinov	Attendance: 3,000

==== Vodacom Challenge ====
18 July 2009 First round	Orlando Pirates	2–0	Manchester City	Polokwane, South Africa
14:00 (local time)	Thwala 35' (pen.); Mongala 55'; Kanono (yellow card) 90'	MCFC report Football365 report YouTube video	(yellow card) 45' Bellamy; (yellow card) 45' Petrov	Stadium: Peter Mokaba Stadium; Attendance: 26,000; Referee: Alex Tiyeho (Namibia)

21 July 2009 First round	Kaizer Chiefs	0–1	Manchester City	Durban, South Africa
19:15 (local time)		MCFC report Football365 report MCFC video	(yellow card) 44' Caicedo; 45+2' Ireland; (yellow card) 54' Barry	Stadium: Kings Park Stadium; Attendance: 45,000; Referee: Welington Kaoma (Zambia)

25 July 2009 Final	Kaizer Chiefs	1–0	Manchester City	Pretoria, South Africa
14:00 (local time)	Ntuka 42'	MCFC report Football365 report		Stadium: Loftus Versfeld Stadium; Attendance: 40,000; Referee: Rajindraparsad Seechurn (Mauritius)

1 August 2009	Barnsley	1–1	Manchester City	Barnsley, England
15:00 BST	Bogdanović 84'	MCFC report MCFC video	87' Petrov	Stadium: Oakwell Stadium; Attendance: 13,611; Referee: Jonathan Moss (West Yorkshire)

5 August 2009	Rangers	3–2	Manchester City	Glasgow, Scotland
19:45 BST	Novo 19'; Davis 54'; Weir 90+2'	MCFC report MCFC video	27' Ireland; 52' Petrov	Stadium: Ibrox Stadium; Attendance: 35,120; Referee: Craig Thomson (Paisley)

8 August 2009	Manchester City	2–1	Celtic	Manchester, England
15:00 BST	Barry 16'; Bellamy 51'	MCFC report MCFC video	23' Killen	Stadium: City of Manchester Stadium; Attendance: 29,023; Referee: Martin Atkinson (Yorkshire)

==== Mid-season ====
===== Joan Gamper Trophy =====
19 August 2009	Barcelona	0–1	Manchester City	Barcelona, Spain
21:15 BST		MCFC report FC Barcelona report YouTube video	27' Petrov	Stadium: Camp Nou; Attendance: 94,123; Referee: David Miranda Torres (Catalonia)

===== Emirates Foundation Cup =====
12 November 2009	United Arab Emirates	1–0	Manchester City	Abu Dhabi, UAE
16:00 GMT	Al-Shehhi 9' (pen.)	MCFC report YouTube video		Stadium: Sheikh Zayed Stadium; Attendance: 26,000; Referee: Mohamed Omar Al Saeedi (UAE)

== Competitive games ==
=== Premier League ===
==== Position in final standings ====
Pos	Team	Pld	W	D	L	GF	GA	GD	Pts	Qualification or relegation
3	Arsenal	38	23	6	9	83	41	+42	75	Qualification for the Champions League group stage
4	Tottenham Hotspur	38	21	7	10	67	41	+26	70	Qualification for the Champions League play-off round
5	Manchester City	38	18	13	7	73	45	+28	67	Qualification for the Europa League play-off round (Note: Since Manchester United won the League Cup and then qualified for the Champions League, their spot in the Europa League was passed down to the 6th-placed team. The 6th-placed Aston Villa was coincidentally also the League Cup runners-up.)
6	Aston Villa	38	17	13	8	52	39	+13	64	Qualification for the Europa League play-off round
7	Liverpool	38	18	9	11	61	35	+26	63	Qualification for the Europa League third qualifying round (Note: Originally Portsmouth qualified for the third qualifying round of the Europa League as the FA Cup runners-up, replacing the winners, Champions League-qualified Chelsea. However, they failed to apply for a UEFA licence. Therefore, Liverpool as the best placed team not qualified for the European competitions took their place.)

Source: Barclays Premier League

==== Results summary ====
Overall								Home						Away					
Pld	W	D	L	GF	GA	GD	Pts	W	D	L	GF	GA	GD	W	D	L	GF	GA	GD
38	18	13	7	73	45	+28	67	12	4	3	41	20	+21	6	9	4	32	25	+7

Last updated: 9 May 2010 (end of season).
Source: Premier League results 2009–10

==== Points breakdown ====
Points at home: 40
Points away from home: 27

Points against "Big Four" teams: 12
Points against promoted teams: 14

6 points: Blackburn Rovers, Chelsea, Portsmouth, Wolverhampton Wanderers
4 points: Arsenal, Aston Villa, Birmingham City, Bolton Wanderers, Burnley,

Fulham, Stoke City, Sunderland, West Ham United, Wigan Athletic

2 points: Liverpool
1 point: Hull City
0 points: Everton, Manchester United, Tottenham Hotspur

==== Biggest & smallest ====
Biggest home win: 5–1 vs. Birmingham City, 11 April 2010
Biggest home defeat: 0–2 vs. Everton, 24 March 2010
Biggest away win: 1–6 vs. Burnley, 3 April 2010
Biggest away defeat: 3–0 vs. Tottenham Hotspur, 16 December 2009

Biggest home attendance: 47,370 vs. Tottenham Hotspur, 5 May 2010
Smallest home attendance: 40,292 vs. Blackburn Rovers, 11 January 2010
Biggest away attendance: 75,066 vs. Manchester United, 20 September 2009
Smallest away attendance: 17,826 vs. Portsmouth, 30 August 2009

==== Results by round ====
Round	1	2	3	4	5	6	7	8	9	10	11	12	13	14	15	16	17	18	19	20	21	22	23	24	25	26	27	28	29	30	31	32	33	34	35	36	37	38
Ground	A	H	A	H	A	H	A	A	H	A	H	A	H	H	A	A	H	H	A	H	A	H	A	H	A	H	A	A	A	H	H	A	H	H	A	H	H	A
Result	W	W	W	W	L	W	D	D	D	D	D	D	D	W	D	L	W	W	W	W	L	W	L	W	D	D	W	D	W	L	W	W	W	L	D	W	L	D
Position	2	5	4	3	4	5	4	5	6	4	6	6	6	6	6	8	6	6	5	4	5	6	6	5	4	4	4	5	5	5	5	4	4	4	5	5	5	5

Updated to match(es) played on 9 May 2010 (end of season). Source: 2009–10 Premier League results
A = Away; H = Home; W = Win; D = Draw; L = Loss

==== Matches ====
15 August 2009 1	Blackburn Rovers	0–2	Manchester City	Blackburn
15:00 BST		BBC Sport report Guardian report	3' Adebayor; 90+1' Ireland	Stadium: Ewood Park; Attendance: 29,584 (7,448 away); Referee: Mike Dean

22 August 2009 2	Manchester City	1–0	Wolverhampton Wanderers	Manchester
15:00 BST	Adebayor 17'	BBC Sport report Guardian report		Stadium: City of Manchester Stadium; Attendance: 47,287 (2,809 away); Referee: Lee Mason

30 August 2009 3	Portsmouth	0–1	Manchester City	Portsmouth
13:30 BST		BBC Sport report Guardian report	30' Adebayor	Stadium: Fratton Park; Attendance: 17,826 (2,085 away); Referee: Howard Webb

12 September 2009 4	Manchester City	4–2	Arsenal	Manchester
15:00 BST	Richards 19'; Bellamy 73'; Adebayor 79'; Wright-Phillips 84'	BBC Sport report Guardian report	62' Van Persie; 87' Rosický	Stadium: City of Manchester Stadium; Attendance: 47,339 (2,846 away); Referee: Mark Clattenburg

20 September 2009 5	Manchester United	4–3	Manchester City	Manchester
13:30 BST	Rooney 2'; Anderson (yellow card) 36'; Vidić (yellow card) 43'; Fletcher 49', 80'; Owen 90+6'	BBC Sport report Guardian report	16' Barry; Tevez (yellow card) 27'; 52', 90', (yellow card) 58' Bellamy	Stadium: Old Trafford; Attendance: 75,066 (3,051 away); Referee: Martin Atkinson

28 September 2009 6	Manchester City	3–1	West Ham United	Manchester
20:00 BST	Tevez 5', 61'; Petrov 31'	BBC Sport report Guardian report	24' Cole	Stadium: City of Manchester Stadium; Attendance: 42,745 (1,100 away); Referee: Chris Foy

5 October 2009 7	Aston Villa	1–1	Manchester City	Birmingham
20:00 BST	Dunne 15'	BBC Sport report Guardian report	67' Bellamy	Stadium: Villa Park; Attendance: 37,924 (2,874 away); Referee: Mike Dean

18 October 2009 8	Wigan Athletic	1–1	Manchester City	Wigan
16:00 BST	N'Zogbia 45+1'	BBC Sport report Guardian report	47' Petrov	Stadium: DW Stadium; Attendance: 20,005 (4,631 away); Referee: Alan Wiley

25 October 2009 9	Manchester City	2–2	Fulham	Manchester
15:00 GMT	Lescott 53'; Petrov 60'	BBC Sport report Guardian report	62' Duff; 68' Dempsey	Stadium: City of Manchester Stadium; Attendance: 44,906 (595 away); Referee: Kevin Friend

1 November 2009 10	Birmingham City	0–0	Manchester City	Birmingham
16:00 GMT		BBC Sport report Guardian report		Stadium: St Andrew's; Attendance: 21,462 (2,298 away); Referee: Mike Dean

7 November 2009 11	Manchester City	3–3	Burnley	Manchester
15:00 GMT	Wright-Phillips 42'; Touré 54'; Bellamy 57'	BBC Sport report Guardian report	18' (pen.) Alexander; 31' Fletcher; 86' McDonald	Stadium: City of Manchester Stadium; Attendance: 47,205 (2,838 away); Referee: Stuart Attwell

21 November 2009 12	Liverpool	2–2	Manchester City	Liverpool
12:45 GMT	Carragher (yellow card) 17'; Škrtel 50'; Lucas (yellow card) 63'; Benayoun 77'	BBC Sport report Guardian report	Ireland 69'; Adebayor 72'	Stadium: Anfield; Attendance: 44,164 (2,964 away); Referee: Phil Dowd

28 November 2009 13	Manchester City	1–1	Hull City	Manchester
15:00 GMT	Wright-Phillips 45+1'	BBC Sport report Guardian report	82' (pen.) Bullard	Stadium: City of Manchester Stadium; Attendance: 46,382 (2,358 away); Referee: Lee Probert

5 December 2009 14	Manchester City	2–1	Chelsea	Manchester
17:30 GMT	Adebayor 37'; Tevez 56'	BBC Sport report Guardian report	8' (o.g.) Adebayor	Stadium: City of Manchester Stadium; Attendance: 47,348 (2,846 away); Referee: Howard Webb

12 December 2009 15	Bolton Wanderers	3–3	Manchester City	Bolton
15:00 GMT	Klasnić 11', 53'; Cahill 43'	BBC Sport report Guardian report	28', 77' Tevez; 45+2' Richards	Stadium: Reebok Stadium; Attendance: 22,735 (4,634 away); Referee: Mark Clattenburg

16 December 2009 16	Tottenham Hotspur	3–0	Manchester City	London
20:00 GMT	Kranjčar 37', 90+3'; Defoe 54'	BBC Sport report Guardian report		Stadium: White Hart Lane; Attendance: 35,891 (1,696 away); Referee: Alan Wiley

19 December 2009 17	Manchester City	4–3	Sunderland	Manchester
15:00 GMT	Santa Cruz 4', 69'; Tevez 12' (pen.); Bellamy 35'	BBC Sport report Guardian report	16' Mensah; 24' Henderson; 62' Jones	Stadium: City of Manchester Stadium; Attendance: 44,735 (2,696 away); Referee: Andre Marriner

26 December 2009 18	Manchester City	2–0	Stoke City	Manchester
15:00 GMT	Petrov 27'; Tevez 45+3'	BBC Sport report Guardian report		Stadium: City of Manchester Stadium; Attendance: 47,325 (2,844 away); Referee: Lee Mason

28 December 2009 19	Wolverhampton Wanderers	0–3	Manchester City	Wolverhampton
19:45 GMT		BBC Sport report Guardian report	33', 86' Tevez; 69' Garrido	Stadium: Molineux; Attendance: 28,957 (2,691 away); Referee: Mike Jones

11 January 2010 20	Manchester City	4–1	Blackburn Rovers	Manchester
20:00 GMT	Tevez 7', 49', 90+1'; Richards 39'	BBC Sport report Guardian report	71' Pedersen	Stadium: City of Manchester Stadium; Attendance: 40,292 (821 away); Referee: Chris Foy

16 January 2010 21	Everton	2–0	Manchester City	Liverpool
17:30 GMT	Pienaar 36'; Saha 45+3'	BBC Sport report Guardian report		Stadium: Goodison Park; Attendance: 37,378 (2,626 away); Referee: Andre Marriner

31 January 2010 22	Manchester City	2–0	Portsmouth	Manchester
13:30 GMT	Adebayor 39'; Kompany 45+1'	BBC Sport report Guardian report		Stadium: City of Manchester Stadium; Attendance: 44,015 (701 away); Referee: Martin Atkinson

6 February 2010 23	Hull City	2–1	Manchester City	Kingston upon Hull
15:00 GMT	Altidore 31'; Boateng 54'	BBC Sport report Guardian report	59' Adebayor	Stadium: KC Stadium; Attendance: 25,000 (2,452 away); Referee: Phil Dowd

9 February 2010 24	Manchester City	2–0	Bolton Wanderers	Manchester
19:45 GMT	Tevez 31' (pen.); Adebayor 73'	BBC Sport report Guardian report		Stadium: City of Manchester Stadium; Attendance: 42,016 (985 away); Referee: Mike Jones

16 February 2010 25	Stoke City	1–1	Manchester City	Stoke-on-Trent
19:45 GMT	Whelan 72'	BBC Sport report Guardian report	86' Barry	Stadium: Britannia Stadium; Attendance: 26,778 (2,242 away); Referee: Alan Wiley

21 February 2010 26	Manchester City	0–0	Liverpool	Manchester
15:00 GMT		BBC Sport report Guardian report		Stadium: City of Manchester Stadium; Attendance: 47,203 (2,704 away); Referee: Peter Walton

27 February 2010 27	Chelsea	2–4	Manchester City	London
12:45 GMT	Lampard 42', 90+1' (pen.)	BBC Sport report Guardian report	45+1', 76' (pen.) Tevez; 51', 87' Bellamy	Stadium: Stamford Bridge; Attendance: 41,814 (1,454 away); Referee: Mike Dean

14 March 2010 28	Sunderland	1–1	Manchester City	Sunderland
16:00 GMT	Jones 9'	BBC Sport report Guardian report	90+1' A. Johnson	Stadium: Stadium of Light; Attendance: 41,398 (1,845 away); Referee: Chris Foy

21 March 2010 29	Fulham	1–2	Manchester City	London
15:00 GMT	Murphy 75' (pen.)	BBC Sport report Guardian report	7' Santa Cruz; 36' Tevez	Stadium: Craven Cottage; Attendance: 25,359 (1,686 away); Referee: Lee Probert

24 March 2010 30	Manchester City	0–2	Everton	Manchester
19:45 GMT		BBC Sport report Guardian report	33' Cahill; 85' Arteta	Stadium: City of Manchester Stadium; Attendance: 45,708 (2,846 away); Referee: Peter Walton

29 March 2010 31	Manchester City	3–0	Wigan Athletic	Manchester
20:00 BST	Tevez 72', 75', 84'	BBC Sport report Guardian report		Stadium: City of Manchester Stadium; Attendance: 43,534 (601 away); Referee: Stuart Attwell

3 April 2010 32	Burnley	1–6	Manchester City	Burnley
17:30 BST	Fletcher 71'	BBC Sport report Guardian report	4', 45' Adebayor; 5' Bellamy; 7' Tevez; 20' Vieira; 58' Kompany	Stadium: Turf Moor; Attendance: 21,330 (2,339 away); Referee: Alan Wiley

11 April 2010 33	Manchester City	5–1	Birmingham City	Manchester
16:00 BST	Tevez 38' (pen.), 40'; Adebayor 43', 88'; Onuoha 74'	BBC Sport report Guardian report	42' Jerome	Stadium: City of Manchester Stadium; Attendance: 45,209 (1,193 away); Referee: Phil Dowd

17 April 2010 34	Manchester City	0–1	Manchester United	Manchester
12:45 BST		BBC Sport report Guardian report	90+3' Scholes	Stadium: City of Manchester Stadium; Attendance: 47,019 (2,596 away); Referee: Martin Atkinson

24 April 2010 35	Arsenal	0–0	Manchester City	London
17:30 BST		BBC Sport report Guardian report Guardian report		Stadium: Emirates Stadium; Attendance: 60,086 (2,944 away); Referee: Mike Dean

1 May 2010 36	Manchester City	3–1	Aston Villa	Manchester
15:00 BST	Tevez 41' (pen.); Adebayor 43'; Bellamy 89'	BBC Sport report Guardian report	16' Carew	Stadium: City of Manchester Stadium; Attendance: 47,102; Referee: Mark Clattenburg

5 May 2010 37	Manchester City	0–1	Tottenham Hotspur	Manchester
20:00 BST		BBC Sport report Guardian report	82' Crouch	Stadium: City of Manchester Stadium; Attendance: 47,370; Referee: Steve Bennett

9 May 2010 38	West Ham United	1–1	Manchester City	London
16:00 BST	Boa Morte 18'	BBC Sport report Guardian report	21' Wright-Phillips	Stadium: Boleyn Ground; Attendance: 34,989; Referee: Howard Webb

=== FA Cup ===
2 January 2010 Third round	Middlesbrough	0–1	Manchester City	Middlesbrough
15:00		BBC Sport report MCFC report	45' Benjani	Stadium: Riverside Stadium; Attendance: 12,474; Referee: Stuart Attwell

24 January 2010 Fourth round	Scunthorpe United	2–4	Manchester City	Scunthorpe
16:00	Hayes 29'; Boyata 69' (o.g.)	BBC Sport report	3' Petrov; 45' Onuoha; 57' Sylvinho; 84' Robinho	Stadium: Glanford Park; Attendance: 8,861; Referee: Kevin Friend

13 February 2010 Fifth round	Manchester City	1–1	Stoke City	Manchester
17:15	Wright-Phillips 11'	BBC Sport report MCFC report	57' Fuller	Stadium: City of Manchester Stadium; Attendance: 28,019; Referee: Mark Clattenburg

24 February 2010 Fifth round Replay	Stoke City	3–1 (a.e.t.)	Manchester City	Stoke-on-Trent
19:45	Kitson 79'; Shawcross 95'; Tuncay 99'	BBC Sport report MCFC report	Bellamy 81'	Stadium: Britannia Stadium; Attendance: 21,813; Referee: Steve Bennett

=== League Cup ===
27 August 2009 Second round	Crystal Palace	0–2	Manchester City	London
20:00		BBC Sport report MCFC report	50' Wright-Phillips; 72' Tevez	Stadium: Selhurst Park; Attendance: 14,725; Referee: Darren Deadman

23 September 2009 Third round	Manchester City	2–1 (a.e.t.)	Fulham	Manchester
20:00	Barry 52'; Touré 111'	BBC Sport report	34' Gera	Stadium: City of Manchester Stadium; Attendance: 24,507; Referee: Stuart Attwell

28 October 2009 Fourth round	Manchester City	5–1	Scunthorpe United	Manchester
19:45	Ireland 3'; Santa Cruz 37'; Lescott 55'; Tevez 71'; M. Johnson 76'	BBC Sport report MCFC report	25' Forte	Stadium: City of Manchester Stadium; Attendance: 36,358; Referee: Michael Oliver

2 December 2009 Fifth round	Manchester City	3–0	Arsenal	Manchester
19:45	Tevez 50'; Wright-Phillips 69'; Weiss 89'	BBC Sport report		Stadium: City of Manchester Stadium; Attendance: 46,015; Referee: Chris Foy

19 January 2010 Semi-finals^{1st Leg}	Manchester City	2–1	Manchester United	Manchester
20:00 (Rescheduled)	Tevez 42' (pen.), 65'	BBC Sport report MCFC report	17' Giggs	Stadium: City of Manchester Stadium; Attendance: 46,067; Referee: Mike Dean
Note: This match was originally scheduled to be played on 6 January, but both semi-final legs were subsequently rescheduled due to heavy snow.

27 January 2010 Semi-finals^{2nd Leg}	Manchester United	3–1 (4–3 agg.)	Manchester City	Manchester
20:00 (Rescheduled)	Scholes 57'; Carrick 71'; Rooney 90+2'	BBC Sport report MCFC report	Tevez 76'	Stadium: Old Trafford; Attendance: 74,576; Referee: Howard Webb

== Squad information ==
=== Playing statistics ===
Appearances (Apps.) numbers are for appearances in competitive games only including sub appearances
Red card numbers denote: Numbers in parentheses represent red cards overturned for wrongful dismissal.

No.	Nat.	Player	Pos.	Premier League				FA Cup				League Cup				Total			
No.	Nat.	Player	Pos.	Apps	Goal	Yellow card	Red card	Apps	Goal	Yellow card	Red card	Apps	Goal	Yellow card	Red card	Apps	Goal	Yellow card	Red card
1	(Republic of Ireland)	Shay Given	GK	35		2		3				6				44		2	
2	(England)	Micah Richards	DF	23	3	2		2		1		4		1		29	3	4	
3	(England)	Wayne Bridge	DF	23		2		2				3				28		2	
4	(England)	Nedum Onuoha	DF	10	1			2	1			1				13	1		
5	(Argentina)	Pablo Zabaleta	DF	27		9	1	4		1		4		2		35		12	1
6	(England)	Michael Johnson	MF	1								1	1			2	1		
7	(Republic of Ireland)	Stephen Ireland	MF	22	2			3				5	1			30	3		
8	(England)	Shaun Wright-Phillips	MF	30	4	2		2	1			6	2			38	7	2	
10	(Brazil)	Robinho	FW	10				1	1	1		1				12	1	1	
11	(England)	Adam Johnson	MF	16	1	1										16	1	1	
12	(England)	Stuart Taylor	GK					1								1			
14	(Paraguay)	Roque Santa Cruz	FW	19	3	1		2				1	1			22	4	1	
15	(Spain)	Javier Garrido	DF	9	1	1		1		1		2				12	1	2	
16	(Brazil)	Sylvinho	DF	10		2		3	1	1		2				15	1	3	
17	(Bulgaria)	Martin Petrov	MF	16	4			3	1			1				20	5		
18	(England)	Gareth Barry	MF	34	2	4		3		1		6	1			43	3	5	
19	(England)	Joleon Lescott	DF	18	1	1		2				4	1			24	2	1	
22	(Republic of Ireland)	Richard Dunne	DF	2												2			
24	(France)	Patrick Vieira	MF	13	1	2		1								14	1	2	
25	(Togo)	Emmanuel Adebayor	FW	26	14	1		2			1	3				31	14	1	1
27	(Zimbabwe)	Benjani	FW	2				2	1			2				6	1		
28	(Ivory Coast)	Kolo Touré	DF	31	1	1		1				3	1			35	2	1	
32	(Argentina)	Carlos Tevez	FW	35	23	6		1				6	6	1		42	29	7	
33	(Belgium)	Vincent Kompany	DF	25	2	2		3				4		1		32	2	3	
34	(Netherlands)	Nigel de Jong	MF	34		7		3				5		2		42		9	
37	(Faroe Islands)	Gunnar Nielsen	GK	1												1			
38	(Hungary)	Márton Fülöp	GK	3												3			
39	(Wales)	Craig Bellamy	FW	32	10	5	1	3	1	1		5		1		40	11	7	
40	(Slovakia)	Vladimír Weiss	MF					1				3	1			4	1		
44	(Belgium)	Dedryck Boyata	DF	3		1		2				2				7		1	
45	(Republic of Ireland)	Greg Cunningham	DF	2				1		1						3		1	
48	(Norway)	Abdisalam Ibrahim	MF	1				1								2			
52	(England)	Alex Nimely	FW	1												1			
Own goals					0				0				0				0		
Totals					73	52	2		7	8	1		15	9	0		95	69	3

=== Goalscorers ===
Includes all competitive matches. The list is sorted alphabetically by surname when total goals are equal.

No.	Player	Pos.	Premier League	FA Cup	League Cup	TOTAL
32	Carlos Tevez	FW	23	0	6	29
25	Emmanuel Adebayor	FW	14	0	0	14
39	Craig Bellamy	FW	10	1	0	11
8	Shaun Wright-Phillips	MF	4	1	2	7
17	Martin Petrov	MF	4	1	0	5
14	Roque Santa Cruz	FW	3	0	1	4
18	Gareth Barry	MF	2	0	1	3
7	Stephen Ireland	MF	2	0	1	3
2	Micah Richards	DF	3	0	0	3
19	Joleon Lescott	DF	1	0	1	2
33	Vincent Kompany	DF	2	0	0	2
4	Nedum Onuoha	DF	1	1	0	2
28	Kolo Touré	DF	1	0	1	2
15	Javier Garrido	DF	1	0	0	1
11	Adam Johnson	MF	1	0	0	1
6	Michael Johnson	MF	0	0	1	1
27	Benjani	FW	0	1	0	1
10	Robinho	FW	0	1	0	1
16	Sylvinho	DF	0	1	0	1
24	Patrick Vieira	DF	1	0	0	1
40	Vladimír Weiss	MF	0	0	1	1
Own goals			0	0	0	0
Totals			73	7	15	95

== Awards ==
=== Premier League Player of the Month award ===
Awarded monthly to the player that was chosen by a panel assembled by the Premier League's sponsor

Month	Player	Club
December	(Argentina) Carlos Tevez	Manchester City

=== PFA Fans' Player of the Month award ===
Awarded monthly to four players – one in each of the Premier League plus the three divisions of the Football League – those players being the ones that receive the most votes cast for that league in a poll conducted each month on the PFA's OWS (http://www.givemefootball.com)

Month	Player	Club
March	(Argentina) Carlos Tevez	Manchester City

=== LMA Performance of the Week award ===
Awarded on a weekly basis to the Premier League or Football League team that a five-man LMA adjudication panel deems to have performed in some outstanding manner

Week ending	Awarded to	For performance in
5 March 2010	Manchester City	Chelsea 2 – 4 Manchester City

=== Etihad Player of the Month awards ===
Awarded to the player in each category that receives the most votes in a poll conducted each month on the MCFC OWS

Month	First Team	Reserve Team	Academy
August/September	(Wales) Craig Bellamy	(England) David Ball	(England) Tom Smith
October	(Bulgaria) Martin Petrov	(Republic of Ireland) Donal McDermott	(Norway) Omar Elabdellaoui
November	(Republic of Ireland) Shay Given	(England) James Poole	(Hong Kong) Sean Tse
December	(Argentina) Carlos Tevez	N/A	
January	(Argentina) Carlos Tevez	N/A	
February	(Belgium) Vincent Kompany	N/A	
March	(England) Adam Johnson	N/A	
April	(Argentina) Carlos Tevez	N/A	

=== Etihad / OSC Player of the Year awards ===
Player	Season 2009–10 awards	Notes
(Argentina) Carlos Tevez	OSC Player of the Year	OSC = Official Supporters Club
(Belgium) Dedryck Boyata	OSC Young Player of the Year	OSC = Official Supporters Club
(Argentina) Carlos Tevez	Players' Player of the Year	
(England) Adam Johnson	Goal of the Season	Sunderland 1 – 1 Manchester City; 14 March 2010
(Wales) Craig Bellamy	Performance of the Season	Manchester United 4 – 3 Manchester City; 20 September 2009
(England) Shaun Wright-Phillips	Community Player of the Year	

== Transfers and loans ==
=== Transfers in ===
==== First team ====
Date	Pos.	Player	From club	Transfer fee
1 July 2009	MF	(England) Gareth Barry	(England) Aston Villa	£12,000,000
1 July 2009	FW	(Paraguay) Roque Santa Cruz	(England) Blackburn Rovers	£18,000,000
1 July 2009	GK	(England) Stuart Taylor	(England) Aston Villa	Free
13 July 2009	FW	(Argentina) Carlos Tevez	(England) Manchester United	£25,500,000
18 July 2009	FW	(Togo) Emmanuel Adebayor	(England) Arsenal	£25,000,000
29 July 2009	DF	(Ivory Coast) Kolo Touré	(England) Arsenal	£16,000,000
24 Aug 2009	DF	(Brazil) Sylvinho	(Spain) Barcelona	Free
25 Aug 2009	DF	(England) Joleon Lescott	(England) Everton	£22,000,000
8 Jan 2010	MF	(France) Patrick Vieira	(Italy) Internazionale	Free
1 Feb 2010	MF	(England) Adam Johnson	(England) Middlesbrough	Undisc.

==== Reserves & Academy ====
Date	Pos.	Player	From club	Transfer fee
1 July 2009	GK	(Germany) Loris Karius	(Germany) VfB Stuttgart	Undisc.
1 July 2009	DF	(Germany) Nils Zander	(Germany) Schalke 04	Undisc.
29 Aug 2009	MF	(Spain) Joan Ángel Román	(Spain) Espanyol	Undisc.
Sep. 2009	GK	(Colombia) David González	(Argentina) Huracán	Trial
Jan. 2010	GK	(Colombia) David González	(Argentina) Huracán	Free

=== Transfers out ===
==== First team ====
Exit Date	Pos.	Player	To club	Transfer fee
1 July 2009	DF	(England) Danny Mills	Retired	
1 July 2009	FW	(England) Daniel Sturridge	(England) Chelsea	Tribunal
1 July 2009	FW	(England) Darius Vassell	(Turkey) Ankaragücü	Released
1 July 2009	MF	(Germany) Dietmar Hamann	(England) MK Dons	Released
1 July 2009	DF	(England) Michael Ball	Released	
1 July 2009	DF	(Brazil) Gláuber	(Brazil) São Caetano	Released
10 July 2009	MF	(Switzerland) Gelson Fernandes	(France) Saint-Étienne	Undisc.
24 July 2009	FW	(Wales) Ched Evans	(England) Sheffield United	£3,000,000
30 July 2009	MF	(Brazil) Elano	(Turkey) Galatasaray	£8,000,000
14 Aug 2009	GK	(Denmark) Kasper Schmeichel	(England) Notts County	Undisc.
1 Sep 2009	DF	(Israel) Tal Ben Haim	(England) Portsmouth	Free
2 Sep 2009	DF	(Republic of Ireland) Richard Dunne	(England) Aston Villa	£6,000,000

==== Reserves & Academy ====
Exit Date	Pos.	Player	To club	Transfer fee
1 July 2009	DF	(England) Matthew Brown	Released	
1 July 2009	FW	(Republic of Ireland) Ian Daly	(Greece) Aris	Released
1 July 2009	GK	(England) Gregory Hartley	Released	
1 July 2009	GK	(England) Richard Martin	(England) Yeovil Town	Released
1 July 2009	MF	(England) Ben Morris	(England) F.C. United	Released
1 July 2009	DF	(Northern Ireland) Chris Ramsey	Released	
1 July 2009	MF	(Cyprus) Angelos Tsiaklis	(England) F.C. United	Released
1 July 2009	MF	(Hungary) Berna Hovath	Released	
1 July 2009	DF	(Hungary) Peter Varga	Released	
1 July 2009	MF	(Poland) Adrian Cieślewicz	(Wales) Wrexham	Released
1 July 2009	DF	(Slovakia) Igor Paldan	Released	
1 July 2009	MF	(England) Gary Nolan	(England) F.C. United	Released
1 July 2009	MF	(England) Joe Clegg	(England) Witton Albion	Released
1 Aug 2009	DF	(England) Curtis Obeng	(Wales) Wrexham	Released
1 Jan 2010	DF	(England) Clayton McDonald	(England) Walsall	Released

=== Loans in ===
==== First team ====
Start date	End date	Pos.	Player	From club
27 Apr 2010	9 May 2010	GK	(Hungary) Márton Fülöp	(England) Sunderland

==== Reserves & Academy ====
Start date	End date	Pos.	Player	From club
14 Oct 2009	31 Jan 2010	FW	(Wales) J. Cullinane	(Wales) Swansea City

=== Loans out ===
==== First team ====
Start date	End date	Pos.	Player	To club
1 July 2009	31 May 2010	GK	(England) Joe Hart	(England) Birmingham City
7 July 2009	21 Jan 2010	FW	(Brazil) Jô	(England) Everton
23 July 2009	1 Jan 2010	FW	(Ecuador) Felipe Caicedo	(Portugal) Sporting CP
24 July 2009	31 May 2010	DF	(England) Shaleum Logan	(England) Tranmere Rovers
30 July 2009	31 May 2010	FW	(Bulgaria) Valeri Bojinov	(Italy) Parma
22 Aug 2009	31 May 2010	MF	(Nigeria) Kelvin Etuhu	(Wales) Cardiff City
9 Jan 2010	31 May 2010	FW	(Ecuador) Felipe Caicedo	(Spain) Málaga
21 Jan 2010	30 June 2010	FW	(Brazil) Jô	(Turkey) Galatasaray
25 Jan 2010	31 May 2010	MF	(Slovakia) Vladimír Weiss	(England) Bolton Wanderers
28 Jan 2010	4 Aug 2010	FW	(Brazil) Robinho	(Brazil) Santos
1 Feb 2010	15 May 2010	FW	(Zimbabwe) Benjani	(England) Sunderland

==== Reserves & Academy ====
Start date	End date	Pos.	Player	To club
7 Aug 2009	7 Nov 2009	MF	(Republic of Ireland) Donal McDermott	(England) Chesterfield
29 Aug 2009	31 May 2010	DF	(Northern Ireland) Ryan McGivern	(England) Leicester City
1 Sep 2009	15 Dec 2009	DF	(England) Clayton McDonald	(England) Walsall
2 Nov 2009	2 Jan 2010	MF	(England) Adam Clayton	(England) Carlisle United
2 Jan 2010	31 May 2010	MF	(England) Paul Marshall	(England) Aberdeen
19 Jan 2010	31 May 2010	MF	(England) Adam Clayton	(England) Carlisle United
26 Jan 2010	31 May 2010	MF	(Republic of Ireland) Donal McDermott	(England) Scunthorpe United
1 Feb 2010	5 Mar 2010	DF	(England) Javan Vidal	(England) Derby County
9 Feb 2010	11 Mar 2010	DF	(England) Kieran Trippier	(England) Barnsley
24 Mar 2010	12 June 2010	GK	(Norway) Tobias Johansen	(Norway) Kongsvinger
25 Mar 2010	31 May 2010	FW	(England) James Poole	(England) Bury
15 Apr 2010	31 May 2010	FW	(Sweden) John Guidetti	(Sweden) IF Brommapojkarna
