= Ngobeni =

Ngobeni is a surname. Notable people with the surname include:

- Clifford Ngobeni (born 1987), South African footballer
- December Ngobeni (born 1975), South African footballer
- Paul Ngobeni (born 1960), South African lawyer
- Sifiso Ngobeni (born 1997), South African footballer
- Solomon Ngobeni (died 1989), South African murderer
- Thela Ngobeni (born 1989), South African footballer
