= 2006–07 South African Premiership =

Premiership
- Season: 2006–07
- Champions: Mamelodi Sundowns; 5th Premiership title
- Relegated: Maritzburg United
- 2008 CAF Champions League: Mamelodi Sundowns; Silver Stars
- 2008 CAF Confederation Cup: Ajax Cape Town
- Matches: 240
- Goals: 524 (2.18 per match)
- Top goalscorer: Christopher Katongo (15)
- Biggest home win: Kaizer Chiefs 6-1 Maritzburg United (17 Dec 2006)
- Biggest away win: Black Leopards 0-4 Mamelodi Sundowns (7 Mar 2007)
- Highest scoring: Mamelodi Sundowns 5-2 Benoni Premier United (13 Dec 2006) (7 goals)
- Average attendance: 6,358

The 2006–07 South African Premiership, known as the Castle Premiership for sponsorship purposes, and also commonly referred to as the PSL after the governing body, was the eleventh season of the Premiership since its establishment in 1996.

The league was won by Mamelodi Sundowns, who defended their title from the previous season.

== Final table ==
Pos	Team	Pld	W	D	L	GF	GA	GD	Pts	Qualification or relegation
1	Mamelodi Sundowns (C)	30	18	7	5	45	17	+28	61	2008 CAF Champions League
2	Silver Stars	30	14	9	7	32	21	+11	51	2008 CAF Champions League
3	Moroka Swallows	30	14	9	7	32	24	+8	51	
4	Ajax Cape Town	30	13	8	9	34	26	+8	47	2008 CAF Confederation Cup
5	Orlando Pirates	30	12	10	8	36	30	+6	46	
6	Supersport United	30	11	11	8	38	22	+16	44	
7	Jomo Cosmos	30	12	8	10	38	34	+4	44	
8	Bloemfontein Celtic	30	12	8	10	32	32	0	44	
9	Kaizer Chiefs	30	11	9	10	42	32	+10	42	
10	Santos	30	9	10	11	34	40	−6	37	
11	Black Leopards	30	10	7	13	32	42	−10	37	
12	Golden Arrows	30	10	6	14	32	41	−9	36	
13	Bidvest Wits	30	9	8	13	29	34	−5	35	
14	Benoni Premier United	30	6	10	14	22	37	−15	28	
15	AmaZulu (O)	30	7	7	16	22	42	−20	28	Qualification for the relegation play-offs
16	Maritzburg United (R)	30	4	9	17	24	50	−26	21	Relegated

Source: RSSSF
(C) Champions; (O) Play-off winners; (R) Relegated

== Premiership awards ==
- Player of the Season: Godfrey Sapula (Mamelodi Sundowns)
- Players' Player of the Season: Godfrey Sapula
- Coach of the Season: Muhsin Ertugral (Ajax Cape Town)
- Lesley Manyathela Golden Boot Award: Christopher Katongo (Jomo Cosmos)
- Young Player Award: Clifford Ngobeni (Jomo Cosmos)
- Goalkeeper of the Season: Calvin Marlin (Mamelodi Sundowns)
- Finest Moment of the Season: Mamelodi Sundowns vs Kaizer Chiefs (3 February 2007)
- Perfectly Balanced Team of the Season: Mamelodi Sundowns
- Referee of the Season: Abdul Ebrahim
- Assistant Referee of the Season: Toko Malebo
- Supporters through Commitment Award: Bloemfontein Celtic

== Top goalscorers ==
Goals	Player	Team
15	(Zambia) Chris Katongo	Jomo Cosmos
12	(South Africa) Kaizer Motaung Junior	Kaizer Chiefs
11	(South Africa) Erwin Isaacs	Santos
11	(South Africa) Thembinkosi Fanteni	Ajax Cape Town
9	(South Africa) Godfrey Sapula	Mamelodi Sundowns
9	(South Africa) Surprise Moriri	Mamelodi Sundowns
9	(South Africa) Sello Mhlambi	Benoni Premier United
8	(Brazil) Marcos de Jesus	Bidvest Wits
8	(South Africa) Mabhuti Khenyeza	Golden Arrows
8	(South Africa) Shaun Bartlett	Kaizer Chiefs
8	(South Africa) Myron Shongwe	Black Leopards

Last updated: 20 May 2007
Source: PSL official website
