= Valery Nahayo =

Burundian footballer (born 1984)

Personal information
- Full name: Valery Twite Nahayo
- Date of birth: 15 April 1984 (age 42)
- Place of birth: Bujumbura, Burundi
- Height: 1.90 m (6 ft 3 in)
- Position: Central defender

Senior career*
| Years | Team | Apps | (Gls) |
| 2001 | Atomic | 12 | (0) |
| 2002–2003 | Muzinga | 51 | (4) |
| 2004–2008 | Jomo Cosmos | 99 | (0) |
| 2008–2011 | Kaizer Chiefs | 43 | (2) |
| 2011–2014 | Gent | 48 | (1) |
| 2014–2015 | Mpumalanga Black Aces | 5 | (0) |
| 2017–2018 | KSV Temse | 1 | (0) |
| 2018–2019 | FC Ganshoren | 5 | (0) |

International career^{‡}
| 2003–2014 | Burundi | 23 | (1) |
- * Club domestic league appearances and goals as of 14 November 2022 ‡ National team caps and goals as of 14 November 2022

Valery Twite Nahayo (born 15 April 1984) is a Burundian international footballer who played professionally in Belgium and South Africa, among others, as a central defender.

== Career ==
=== Club career ===
Born in Bujumbura, Nahayo has played club football for Atomic, Muzinga, Jomo Cosmos, Kaizer Chiefs, Gent and Mpumalanga Black Aces While playing for Gent in August 2012 he was linked with a return to the Chiefs.

=== Kaizer Chiefs ===
Nahayo joined Chiefs on 20 June 2008 after Jomo Cosmos got relegated; he was one of seven players that left Cosmos including Anthony Laffor, Morgan Gould, Reneilwe Letsholonyane, Sydney Plaatjies, Thapelo Tshilo, Dikgang Mabalane and Nkosinathi Nhleko. During pre-season he competed in the Telkom Charity Cup and the Vodacom Challenge and eventually made his official debut on 8 August 2008 in a 4–0 win over Engen Santos. In the same match he got injured when he tore his knee ligaments, after landing awkwardly in an aerial battle.

=== International career ===
Nahayo made his international debut for Burundi in 2003, and has appeared in FIFA World Cup qualifying matches for them.

=== International goals ===
Scores and results list Burundi's tally first.

| No | Date | Venue | Opponent | Score | Result | Competition |
|---|---|---|---|---|---|---|
| 1. | 29 February 2012 | Prince Louis Rwagasore Stadium, Bujumbura, Burundi | Zimbabwe | 2–1 | 2–1 | 2013 Africa Cup of Nations qualification |
