= Mathebula =

Mathebula is a South African surname. Notable people with the surname include:

- David Mathebula (born 1983), South African soccer player
- Elphus Mathebula, South African politician
- Jeffrey Mathebula (born 1979), South African boxer
- Peter Mathebula (1952–2020), South African boxer
- Tweezy (born Tumelo Thandokuhle Mathebula; 1992), South African rapper and producer
