= Tlou =

Tlou is a given name and surname. People with that name include:

== Surname ==
- Moloko Maggie Tlou (died 2022), South African politician
- Sheila Tlou, former Botswanan minister of health
- Thomas Tlou (1932–2010), Botswanan academic and diplomat

== Given name ==
- Tlou Molekwane (born 1989), South African soccer player
- Tlou Segolela (born 1988), South African soccer player
