= Nelson Mandela Bay Stadium =

Stadium in Gqeberha, South Africa

- The Protea
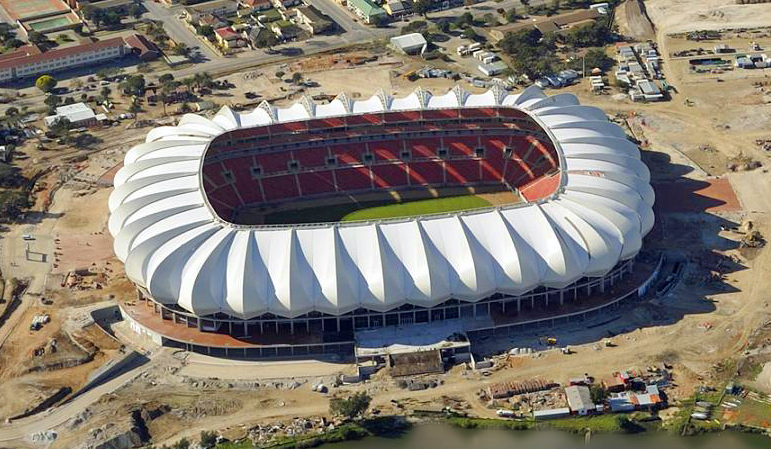
- Aerial view of the stadium
- Interactive map of Nelson Mandela Bay Stadium
- Full name: Nelson Mandela Bay Stadium
- Location: 70 Prince Alfred Road; North End; Gqeberha; South Africa
- Coordinates: 33°56′16″S 25°35′56″E
- Owner: Nelson Mandela Metropolitan Municipality
- Operator: Access Facilities and Leisure Management (Pty) Limited
- Capacity: 42,486 (2010 FIFA World Cup); 46,000 (Soccer and Rugby)
- Surface: Desso GrassMaster (2010–present); Grass (2009–2010)
- Field size: Soccer – 105m x 68m Rugby – 125m x 70m
- Public transit: North End station (Metrorail)

Construction
- Built: 2007–2009
- Opened: 6 June 2009 (first event); 16 June 2009 (first match); 28 February 2010 (official opening)
- Expanded: 2009
- Cost: Rand 2.05 billion (US$ 270 million)
- Architects: Architectural Design Associates(Pty)Ltd & Dominic Bonnesse Architects cc
- Builders: Grinaker-LTA, Interbeton & Ibhayi JV

Tenants
- Chippa United (PSL) (2014–present); Eastern Province Elephants (Currie Cup) (2010–); Southern Kings (Pro14) (2013–2020); South Africa Sevens (2011–2014); South Africa national rugby union team (selected matches)

The Nelson Mandela Bay Stadium is a soccer and rugby union stadium in Gqeberha in the Eastern Cape province of South Africa. It hosted 2010 FIFA World Cup matches, including the third-place play off. It is the home of Chippa United Football Club and formerly of rugby union team Southern Kings.

The five-tier, R2 billion (approximately US$159 million) Nelson Mandela Bay Stadium was built overlooking the South End Lake, at the heart of the city, one of three coastal stadiums built to host the 2010 FIFA World Cup. It regularly hosts large-scale rugby union and soccer matches. The stadium has also been used as a concert venue.

== History ==
The city of Port Elizabeth did not have a large-scale soccer facility, as under the apartheid government, soccer was not given much funding. Soccer clubs in the city had to make use of smaller scale venues throughout the city. Before this stadium was built, most large soccer matches were played at the EPRU Stadium, the city's rugby ground. The EPRU Stadium was often problematic for soccer, as it normally hosts rugby matches, thus the playing surface was not of a great standard. When Port Elizabeth was chosen as a host city for the 2010 FIFA World Cup, the city decided against upgrading the EPRU Stadium. This was because it would have needed to be almost completely rebuilt in order to meet FIFA requirements. The city then decided on building a brand new, multipurpose stadium.

Inevitably, there was a great deal of speculation about the status of stadium construction in the run-up to the 2010 FIFA World Cup, with the requirement that all the FIFA World Cup host stadiums had to be completed by January 2010. The Nelson Mandela Bay Stadium was the first of five new stadiums to start construction. The other new stadiums are in Cape Town, Durban, Polokwane and Nelspruit.

The stadium is named after the administrative district in which the stadium is located, the Nelson Mandela Bay Metropolitan Municipality, itself named after Nelson Mandela, the first president of South Africa. The Nelson Mandela Bay area is made up of the city of Port Elizabeth, the towns of Uitenhage and Despatch, as well as smaller settlements.

The stadium is sometimes incorrectly called the 'Nelson Mandela Stadium' in the media. This may lead to confusion, as there is a Nelson Mandela Stadium in Kampala, Uganda. It is also sometimes mistakenly claimed that the stadium is named after Mandela, rather than the metropolitan area named in his honour.

== Design ==
The stadium was designed by the Department of Public Works' National Construction Week Programme in 2006 with student from Holy Cross High School Thina Dlulane, Yandisa Dalamba, Inga Ngalonkulu and Siyabonga Nyezi from Umtata. Their design that was reviewed in the Mahlamba Ndlopfu Presidency House by the Public Work delegates and was the winning designed prototype concept and was the inspiration behind the design. The stadium has a unique roof-structure and views over the North End Lake. The roof is made up of a series of white 'petals' making it look like a flower. This is the reason for the stadium's nickname, The Protea. The stadium building is approximately 40m high and consists of six levels on the western side in addition to five on each of the north, south and east stands. The main architecture was handled by Architectural Design Associates(Pty)Ltd and Dominic Bonnesse Architects cc. The stadium has three gates for entry, located on the northern, southern and eastern sides of the stadium, the western side of the stadium leads to the North End Lake. The 3 gates are: gate A-B, in Milner Avenue, gate B-C, in Prince Alfred Road, and gate C-D, in Fettes Road.

=== Facilities ===
The stadium seats 46,000 in addition to 4,000 extra seats temporarily installed for the 2010 FIFA World Cup. The seats are of different shades, from light orange to dark red. They are arranged seemingly at random, but this was done to help the stadium appear full at all times. It also means that sun damage is less of a problem and replaced seats are less noticeable. The stadium boasts 49 hospitality suites, two business lounges, a gymnasium, and lecture and function rooms. There are also two conference rooms situated on the first level, which are able to accommodate 200 people.

There are four ramps for easy wheelchair access, three VIP/VVIP lifts, two in the West Stand and one in the East Stand, as well as four service lifts, two on the west and two on the east of the stadium. Four additional lifts are planned for the legacy phase. There are 32 turnstiles and colour-coded gates on level 2 for spectators to access their seats and four ramps leading up from level 2 to level 5.

Two big viewing screens (12.7m x 7.2m) were installed for live coverage of the activities on the field. There are a total of 74 toilet blocks – 36 blocks on level 2 – 4 blocks on level 3 – 14 blocks on level 4 and 20 blocks on level 5.

Parking inside the stadium is provided across five parking zones, providing a total of 500 parking spaces utilised by working staff, anchor tenants, event organisers and hospitality guests.

=== Pitch ===
The playing surface was made of natural grass that was grown off site, in the St Albans area. The areas surrounding the pitch are made of artificial turf. The field that was originally laid was a mixture of kikuyu grass and rye grass, but for the 2010 FIFA World Cup, the field was made up completely of rye grass.

Following the World Cup, a Desso GrassMaster system was installed, due to the high workload of hosting both soccer and rugby matches.

The field was designed to be able to accommodate both soccer and rugby. The pitch is maintained by a group of 5 people, who work day and night to ensure the quality of the playing surface. A lighting system is used to ensure that all grass on the pitch grows properly. A unit with 6 1,000 watt bulbs is used to help certain parts of the pitch covered by shadow due to the stadium roof.

For soccer, the field is marked at the FIFA approved dimensions of 105m by 68m. For rugby the field is marked at 100 m long by 70 m wide, it also has two 10 m by 70 m 'in-goal areas' behind the posts.

== Construction ==
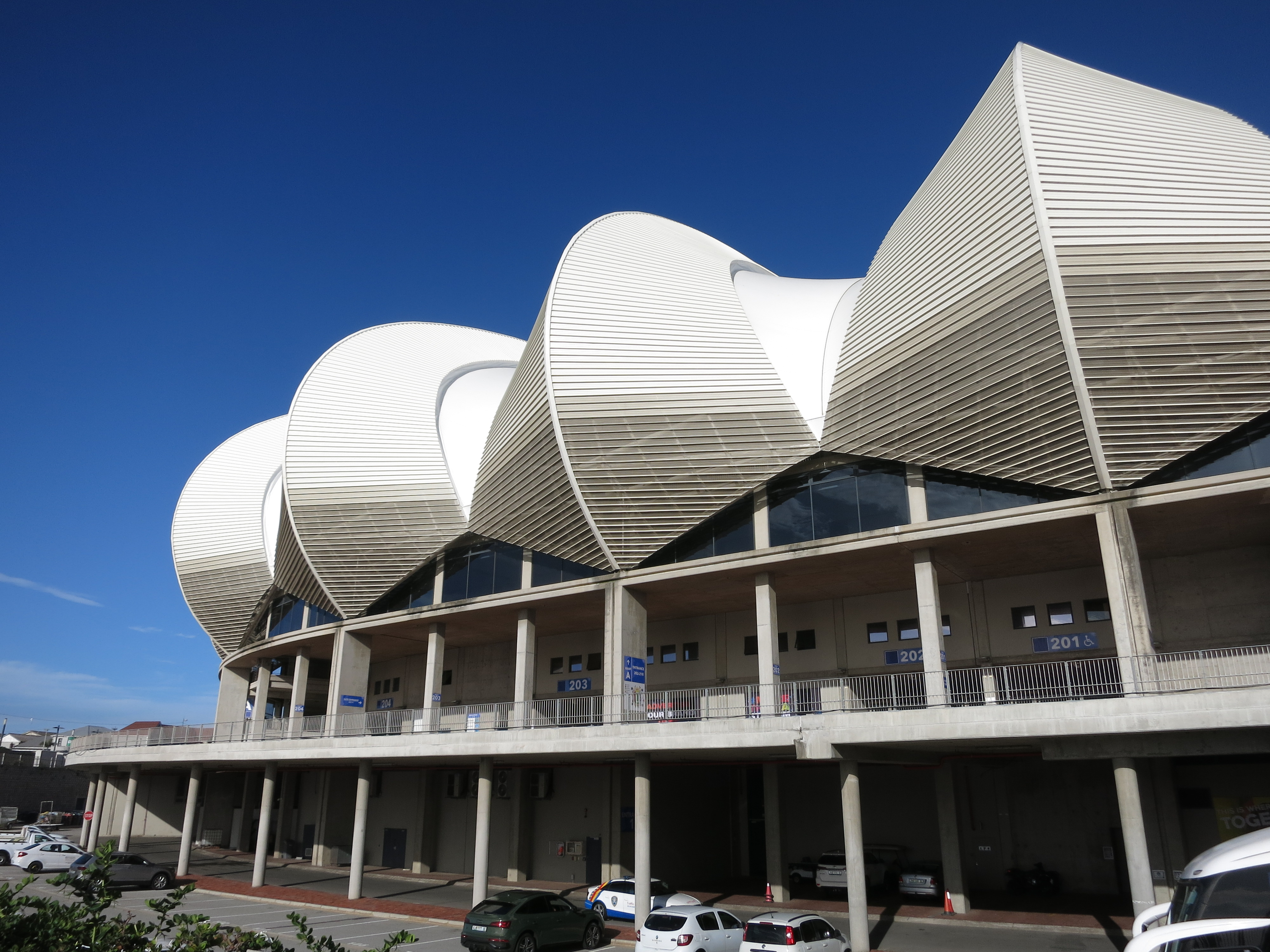
Part of the western side of the Nelson Mandela Bay Stadium

The stadium's construction was handled by a consortium made up of Ibhayi JV. It was built on the site of the old Parks Rugby Club, and the Prince Alfred Park.

The roof material of the stadium consists of a combination of aluminium cladding, combined with a membrane material called polytetrafluoroethylene (PTFE), which is a coated glass-fibre fabric and steel superstructure. This tensile structure was supplied and installed by an Australian company. The total length of piles installed is 21,000 m and the material excavated is 138,000 m^{3}.

The construction of the stadium has significantly benefited the local building industry. This large, fast-track project exposed local stakeholders to a new scale of development, providing long-term advantages for the construction sector. The process also involved extensive collaboration between local suppliers and experts and international specialists, facilitating effective skills transfer.

An estimated total of 6,800 jobs were created throughout the process and the development of the stadium was expected to result in the upliftment and urban renewal of the surrounding residential and commercial area of North End and the major routes leading to the stadium. It was hoped the stadium would bring vast social and economic opportunities, during and after the World Cup.

=== Financing ===
Original estimates put the cost of the stadium at R895 million, of which the city of Port Elizabeth would have been expected to pay R 95 million. This was part of an informal agreement on World Cup stadium funding, whereby local municipalities would cover 10% of costs, provincial government 20% and national treasury would cover the other 70%.

As with other World Cup stadia in South Africa, construction costs for the Nelson Mandela Bay Stadium spiralled substantially. It increased from the June 2006 estimated cost of R 711 million, to R 1.5 billion in May 2008, and finally the completed cost of R 2.065 billion. The stadium eventually cost R 2.1 billion to build, of which the city has already paid R 336 million, and may still be laible to pay a shortfall of R 261 million. However, if the shortfalls are calculated based on the 10-20-70 split, then the national government may still owes the city R 70.5 million and provincial government R 191 million. National treasury has so far contributed R 1.375 billion, or 66.5% of the stadium's cost. Despite this, national treasury has stated that they will not forward more funds to World Cup stadiums.

It appears as though Port Elizabeth residents may make up the shortfall through larger rates increases. There will be an extra 2% increase in property rates, an extra 1% increase in water tariffs and sanitation and refuse rates, as well as an extra 4% increase in electricity tariffs.

The stadium's running costs are estimated to be R18 million per year. As of 2010, the stadiums operating company, Access Facilities and Leisure Management, expected to break even by 2012.

=== Post-World Cup usage ===
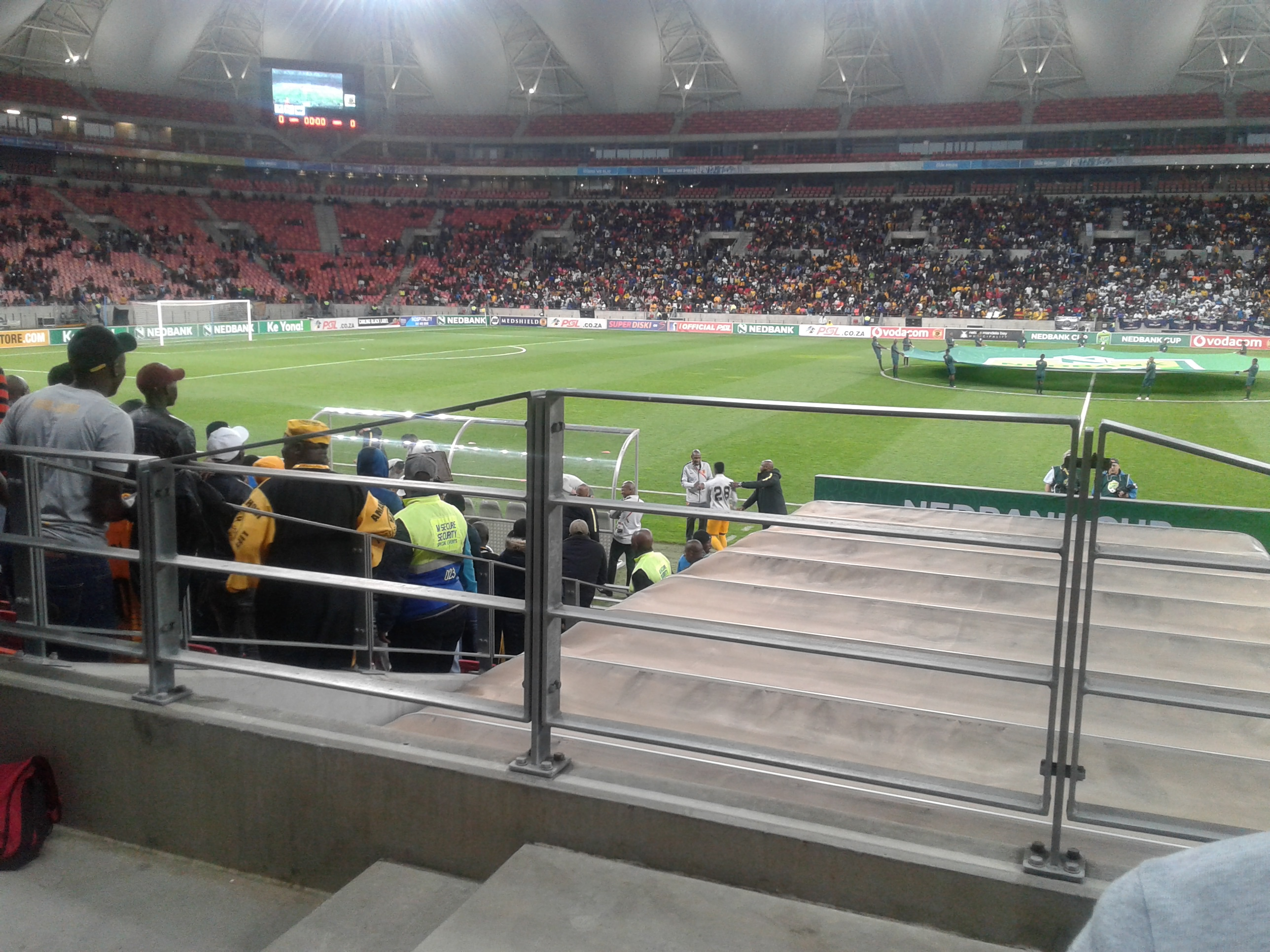
Inside the stadium

The Nelson Mandela Bay Stadium is the home ground to EP Kings, Southern Kings and Chippa United. The Southern Kings were part of the Super Rugby Competition in 2013 but were later relegated.

The stadium has also hosted Springbok test matches and Bafana Bafana matches. The stadium hosted the 2011 Tri Nations match between the Springboks and New Zealand.

In 2011 the stadium hosted a leg of the Vodacom Challenge, as it did in 2009. A crowd of 45,800 attended to watch the showdown between the country's top two PSL teams.

The South African leg of the IRB Sevens World Series was up for tender in late 2010, and the Eastern Province Rugby Union announced an intention to host the event. The South African government also gave its backing to Port Elizabeth hosting the event. Ultimately, SARU announced that Port Elizabeth had won the bidding for hosting rights, and would hold the event at the stadium from 2011 forward.

The stadium was one of the host venues for the 2013 Africa Cup of Nations. South Africa had originally bid to host the 2015 edition and had won rights to the 2017 edition. However, the Libyan Civil War in 2011 led that country, which initially won 2013 hosting rights, to swap dates with South Africa. The stadium would also be used in future bids for South Africa to host the Rugby World Cup.

== Transport ==
The stadium is located along the city's new BRT network. Currently, the dedicated lanes for the buses have been built. Once completed, the BRT buses will ferry people to and from the stadium during game days. The main bus station servicing the stadium will be located in Harrower Road. There will be routes to the stadium from the airport, fan park and the beach front. In addition to the BRT network, there will be a number of 'park and ride' areas. These will be located at King's Beach, St George's Park and Andrew Rabie High School. There will also be a 'park and walks' from Cilliè High School and Dr Viljoen Primary School. There will also be match day train services to the North End train station, which is located about 1.3 km from the stadium.

While the network is still being built, the Algoa Bus Company has set up temporary bus stops in the surrounding streets. These are used on game days, to provide public transport until the completion of the BRT network.

== Precinct ==
Within the stadium area is a park, left over from the old Prince Alfred Park. The park is used for small-scale outdoor concerts.

== Tournament results ==
=== 2009 FIFA Confederations Cup ===
The stadium was originally planned to be one of five venues to be utilised in the 2009 FIFA Confederations Cup, and the only new stadium in the event. The other four stadiums to be used were Ellis Park Stadium, Loftus Versfeld Stadium, Royal Bafokeng Stadium and Free State Stadium. The four stadiums were already built and merely received upgrades for the Confederations Cup.

On 8 July 2008 it was announced that the stadium had been removed from the list of stadiums for the 2009 Confederations Cup as it was believed it would not be ready on time. Surprisingly, however, it became the first newly built 2010 stadium to be completed.

=== 2010 FIFA World Cup ===
The stadium hosted eight games during the 2010 FIFA World Cup tournament. It hosted five group games, as well as a round of 16 game, a quarterfinal and the 3rd/4th playoff.

The stadium's games were:

Date	Time (UTC+2)	Team #1	Result	Team #2	Round	Attendance
12 June 2010	13:30	South Korea	2–0	Greece	Group B	31,513
15 June 2010	16:00	Ivory Coast	0–0	Portugal	Group G	37,034
18 June 2010	13:30	Germany	0–1	Serbia	Group D	38,294
21 June 2010	16:00	Chile	1–0	Switzerland	Group H	34,872
23 June 2010	16:00	Slovenia	0–1	England	Group C	36,893
26 June 2010	16:00	Uruguay	2–1	South Korea	Round of 16	30,597
2 July 2010	16:00	Netherlands	2–1	Brazil	Quarter Finals	40,186
7 July 2010	20:30	Uruguay	2–3	Germany	3rd-place play-off	36,254

=== 2013 Africa Cup of Nations ===
The stadium hosted 8 games during the 2013 Africa Cup of Nations tournament. It hosted 6 group games as well as a quarterfinal and the 3rd/4th playoff.

Date	Time (UTC+2)	Team #1	Result	Team #2	Round	Attendance
20 January 2013	17:00	Ghana	2–2	DR Congo	Group B	7,000
20 January 2013	20:00	Mali	1–0	Niger	Group B	20,000
24 January 2013	17:00	Ghana	1–0	Mali	Group B	8,000
24 January 2013	20:00	Niger	0–0	DR Congo	Group B	12,000
27 January 2013	19:00	Cape Verde	2–1	Angola	Group A	20,000
28 January 2013	19:00	Niger	0–3	Ghana	Group B	10,000
2 February 2013	17:00	Ghana	2–0	Cape Verde	Quarter Finals	8,000
8 February 2013	20:00	Mali	3–1	Ghana	3rd/4th-place play-off	6,000

== Soccer ==
The Nelson Mandela Bay regional branch of SAFA is headquartered at the stadium, having moved from Gelvandale.

The stadium is also the home of Premier Soccer League club, Chippa United F.C., which moved to the stadium for the 2014–15 season.

On 4 July 2009, the stadium hosted the 2009 edition of the Premier's Cup. The teams contesting the cup were, Supersport United, Kaizer Chiefs, Bloemfontein Celtic, and Bay United. 20,000 fans attended this event.

On 23 July 2009, the stadium hosted a leg of the 2009 Vodacom Challenge. The match involved the Orlando Pirates and the Kaizer Chiefs. The 30,000 strong crowd watched the Kaizer Chiefs win 4–3 on penalties, after the game ended 1–1. Kaizer Chiefs went on to face Manchester City in the final of the challenge.

On 9 August 2009, (Women's Day in South Africa) a special double-header of games was played. This, along with female musical acts were performed to celebrate Women's Day. The first match involved two women's teams, Nelson Mandela Bay XI and Amatole Invitational XI, the second was between a Brazilian legends team and a South African legends team. The Brazilian legends were drawn from their 1994 FIFA World Cup winning squad. The South African team was drawn from the 1996 African Cup of Nations winners.

On 14 November 2009, the stadium hosted its first international soccer match. A friendly between Bafana Bafana and Japan was played at the stadium. A crowd of 44,000 watched as the game ended in a 0–0 draw.

On 20 November 2009, the stadium hosted its first Premier Soccer League game. Santos 'hosted' Kaizer Chiefs at the stadium, as no venue was available in the Western Cape due to World Cup renovations. A crowd of 20,000 was in attendance as Kaizer Chiefs won 1–0 in controversial fashion.

On 14 January 2010, the stadium hosted a friendly match. The match was between local National First Division club, Bay United and the South Korea. Korea won 3–1.

On 28 February 2010, Orlando Pirates 'hosted' Gaborone United in the second leg of the preliminary round of the CAF Champions League. The game ended 2 all, with Gaborone United advancing on the away goals rule. The match also served as part of the stadiums official opening ceremony. This included local music acts, a junior football match, and the unveiling of the stadiums official plaque.

The stadium hosted the 2011 edition of the Nelson Mandela Challenge. The international friendly between Bafana Bafana and the Ivory Coast was played on 12 November.

== Rugby ==
The Eastern Province Rugby Union moved from the EPRU Stadium to Nelson Mandela Bay Stadium, after the 2010 FIFA World Cup. The union moved their administrative headquarters to the stadium in July 2010. Having previously hosted certain matches at the stadium

The Eastern Province Rugby Union intended to move all future matches to the stadium. From 2010 onwards, all of Eastern Province's Currie Cup and Vodacom Cup matches were set to be played at the stadium. Their first match after officially moving to the stadium was their 26–25 victory over the Griffons. The team has since hosted some Vodacom Cup matches at other venues.

On 16 June 2009 (Youth Day in South Africa), the stadium played host to a British & Irish Lions tour match. The game was between the Lions and the newly launched Southern Kings. The game was attended by over 35,000 fans, and the Lions won 20–8.

On 19 September 2009, Eastern Province, then known as the Mighty Elephants, played their first Currie Cup First Division game at the stadium. They beat the Falcons 44–8. In addition, the province's U19 and U21 teams played each other in curtain raisers to the main match.

On 23 January 2010, the stadium hosted a Super 14 warm-up match. The Cheetahs played an Eastern Province invitational team. In front of a crowd of 15,000, EP lost 13–9 to the Cheetahs. A curtain raiser was played between 2 Port Elizabeth rugby clubs, Police and Progress.

On 26 February 2010, Eastern Province played the Pampas XV (an Argentine team), in the first round of the 2010 Vodacom Cup. The game ended in a 27-all draw, in front of a crowd of approximately 8,700.

On 10 September 2010, the stadium hosted the final of the EP Grand Challenge, the top league for rugby clubs in the province. The match was between Uithenhage's Progress rugby club and defending champions, Port Elizabeth's Park rugby club. Park rugby club won 28–25, and they went on to represent Eastern Province at the 2010 National Club Championships.

On 29 October, the Eastern Province Kings played the Pumas in the 2nd leg of their Currie Cup promotion/relegation match. The Pumas won the match 46–28, to retain their Premier Division status. The match set a new stadium attendance record of 45 000.

The stadium hosted a series of Super Rugby warm up matches in 2011. These matches will involve the Southern Kings playing against South Africa's 5 other Super Rugby franchises.

In April 2011, the South African Rugby Union (SARU) announced that the stadium would become the new home of the country's leg of the annual IRB Sevens World Series starting with the 2011–12 season. The tournament had previously been held at George in the Western Cape.

On 20 August 2011, the stadium hosted its first rugby test, which was played between South Africa and New Zealand during the fifth game of the 2011 Tri Nations Series.

On 23 June 2012, the stadium hosted its second rugby test, when South Africa hosted England in the third of a three test series at the stadium. The test ended in a 14 all draw, with a crowd of 45,000.

On 28 June 2014, the stadium hosted its third rugby test, which was played between South African and Scotland. South Africa ran out easy 55-6 winners against Scotland in Port Elizabeth, helped by an outstanding performance from Springbok debutant No 10 Handré Pollard.

Nelson Mandela Bay Stadium's events line-up was significantly boosted by SA Rugby Union announcement that the Eastern Province Kings would be included in an expanded version of the Premier Division of the Absa Currie Cup competition.

== Concerts ==
The stadium was to host its first concert on 29 November 2009. The 12-hour event was called the Bay Summer Concert, and was to feature Busta Rhymes, as well as other top acts. Despite all the needed arrangements being made, Busta Rhymes decided not to honour the event. Instead, he chose to do a concert at a local club. He arrived at the stadium hours late, and told those who had stayed, to go to the club that he would be performing at.

A second concert was planned for the stadium from 18 to 20 December 2009. It was billed as the 'Nelson Mandela Bay International Music Festival', and was to have such artists as Keri Hilson but was cancelled due to a lack of funds.

Neil Diamond performed at the stadium on 8 April 2011. The concert was part of his four-date, first time to South Africa tour.

The Nelson Mandela Bay music lovers were treated with some high-energy performances by top South African artists at the International Music Festival which took place on 15 May 2011. The list of performers included R&B sensation Loyiso Bala, talented and legendary Hugh Masekela, with the highlight of the night George Benson.

On 4 December 2011, a crowd of 7,000 were serenaded by the beautiful sounds of Josh Groban at the Nelson Mandela Bay Stadium's Prince Alfred Park.

=== Other Large Events ===
On 6 June 2009 an open day was held at the stadium for residents of the city to see the new venue, as well as serve as a trial run of the stadiums match readiness. The event was attended by government officials as well as 17,000 residents.

On 18 November 2009, the stadium hosted the Miss World Sports event of the Miss World 2009 pageant.

A group of South African churches held a mass prayer around the stadium on 22 March 2010 (a public holiday due to Human Rights Day falling on a Sunday in 2010). They intended to create a chain of people, 1,000m long, around the stadium and hold a 15-minute prayer at 16:00. They prayed for a blessing on both the stadium and World Cup.

The stadium was used to attempt to set a new world record for the most women in bikinis in one place. The attempt was in aid of the Cancer Association of South, and took place on 23 October 2010. With only 905 participants, the record attempt failed, however two other records were set. These were for the largest bikini and swimwear parades.

The stadium was used by Isuzu South Africa to launch the new Isuzu D-MAX for the South African market on 7 April 2022.

In May 2025, Nelson Mandela Bay Stadium hosted a Patriotic Alliance campaign rally ahead of South Africa’s 2026 local government elections. During the rally, party leader Gayton McKenzie spoke about peace, expressed opposition to Hamas, and announced plans to send party members to Israel to study water management practices that could benefit South Africa. The party selected the Nelson Mandela Stadium for its substantial seating capacity, which could accommodate over 40,000 supporters.

== See also ==
- List of stadiums in South Africa
