= Javan Vidal =

English footballer

Personal information
- Full name: Javan Noel Vidal
- Date of birth: 10 May 1989 (age 37)
- Place of birth: Manchester, England
- Height: 5 ft 10 in (1.78 m)
- Positions: Right back; central midfielder

Youth career
- 2005–2007: Manchester City

Senior career*
Years	Team	Apps	(Gls)
2007–2011	Manchester City	0	(0)
2008	→ Grimsby Town (loan)	3	(0)
2009	→ Aberdeen (loan)	13	(0)
2010	→ Derby County (loan)	1	(0)
2011	→ Chesterfield (loan)	6	(0)
2012	Panetolikos	0	(0)
2013	Stockport County	4	(0)
2013–2014	Rochdale	2	(0)
2014–2015	Tamworth	22	(1)
2015–2016	Wrexham	23	(2)
2016–2017	Guiseley	12	(0)
2017–2018	Bradford Park Avenue	33	(1)
2018–2019	Droylsden		
2019	Hednesford Town		
2019–2020	Kettering Town		

International career
2009	England U19		
2009	England U20	2	(0)
- * Club domestic league appearances and goals as of 17:06, 29 April 2019 (UTC)

Javan Noel Vidal (born 10 May 1989) is an English former professional footballer who played as a defender or as a midfielder.

He began his career at Manchester City, where he came through the club's youth team academy. Whilst with City he spent time on loan with Grimsby Town, Aberdeen, Derby County and Chesterfield before being released in 2012. He went on to sign for Panetolikos but left the club having failed to make a first team appearance. Upon his return to England he went on to play for Stockport County, Rochdale, Tamworth, Wrexham, Guiseley, Bradford Park Avenue, Droylsden, Hednesford Town and Kettering Town.

He was capped at England U19 and England U20 levels.

== Career ==
=== Manchester City ===
Born in Manchester, Greater Manchester, Vidal came through the youth ranks at Premier League club Manchester City before signing his first professional contract in May 2007. He was given the number 32 shirt for the 2008–09 season.

He signed on a one-month loan at League Two side Grimsby Town in September 2008. He made his professional debut for Alan Buckley's "Mariners" in a 2–2 draw with Chesterfield in the Football League Trophy First Round at Saltergate on 3 September, coming on as a 59th-minute substitute for Simon Heslop; Grimsby won the tie on penalties. He made his league debut three days later against Gillingham as a second-half substitute for Jamie Clarke. He made his first start at Blundell Park the following week in a 3–1 defeat to Chester City. Vidal returned to the Eastlands after playing a total of four games for Grimsby in all competitions.

Vidal was loaned out to Jimmy Calderwood's Scottish Premier League club Aberdeen in January 2009. He made his debut for the "Dons" on 24 January, coming on as a 64th-minute substitute for Stuart Duff in a 0–0 draw with Rangers at Pittodrie. He went on to score his first goal in senior football on 17 February, in a 5–0 victory over East Fife in the Scottish Cup. In all he played 14 games for Aberdeen in the latter half of the 2008–09 campaign.

Vidal joined Nigel Clough's Derby County on loan in February 2010 until the end of the 2009–10 season. He made just one appearance for the Championship club, as a late substitute in the 3–0 win against Newcastle United at Pride Park Stadium on 9 February, before Roberto Mancini activated a recall clause in his contract and he returned to the City of Manchester Stadium. Vidal signed a new one-year contract with Manchester City in July 2010.

He made his senior debut for City in the League Cup tie against West Bromwich Albion on 22 September 2010; he was replaced by Pablo Zabaleta in the 55th minute of the game after being cautioned early in the first half, the team were leading 1–0 when he was substituted but immediately found themselves two goals down when he was withdrawn and they went on to lose 2–1 in normal time. On 20 January 2011, Vidal signed a five-week loan deal with John Sheridan's Chesterfield. He made a total of six appearances for the "Spireites", who went on to win the League Two title. Vidal was released by City in June 2011. Following his release by Manchester City, Vidal insists that he needed to leave the club due to his desire for regular first-team football and he told Sky Sports that breaking into the side at Eastlands was getting tougher by the year. Vidal was also linked with Yeovil Town and Hibernian, but failed to find a club in summer 2011.

=== Panetolikos ===
Vidal signed a six-month contract with Greek Super League club Panetolikos in January 2012. However, he left the Panetolikos Stadium before making a single appearance for the club due to not being paid as expected. His former England under-20 teammate Febian Brandy joined him at Panetolikos a few weeks after Vidal and had the same experience with the club.

=== Later career ===
Vidal signed for Ian Bogie's Conference Premier side Stockport County in March 2013. He left Edgeley Park when the "Hatters" were relegated at the end of the 2012–13 season.

Vidal signed with League Two side Rochdale in July 2013. He left Spotland in January 2014 having only made two League Two appearances in the first half of the 2013–14 season.

He had a trial with Port Vale in July 2014.

On 29 August 2014 Vidal signed for Conference North side Tamworth. He would score once in his 25 games in the league, before departing the following summer.

On 19 May 2015 Vidal became the second signing of new Wrexham manager Gary Mills. He was released in May 2016, and signed for Guiseley ahead of the 2016–17 National League season. He left the club again in the summer 2017, and switched to Bradford Park Avenue at the start of July the same year.

On 4 September 2018 Vidal signed for Droylsden in the Northern Premier League Division One West league (Evo-Stik West).

On 18 January 2019, Vidal joined Hednesford Town.

Vidal joined Kettering Town for the 2019–20 season.

== International career ==
Vidal won caps for the England under-19s, and was selected for the under-20 international friendly against Italy on 31 March 2009, playing the full 90 minutes and helping England to a 2–0 victory. He was a late call-up for the under-20 international friendly against Montenegro on 11 August 2009, setting up the opening goal for Febian Brandy in a 5–0 victory.

== Career statistics ==
As of match played 5 February 2017

Appearances and goals by club, season and competition
Club	Season	League			National Cup		League Cup		Other		Total	
Club	Season	Division	Apps	Goals	Apps	Goals	Apps	Goals	Apps	Goals	Apps	Goals
Manchester City	2007–08	Premier League	0	0	0	0	0	0	—		0	0
Manchester City	2008–09	Premier League	0	0	0	0	0	0	0	0	0	0
Manchester City	2009–10	Premier League	0	0	0	0	0	0	—		0	0
Manchester City	2010–11	Premier League	0	0	0	0	1	0	0	0	1	0
Manchester City	Total		0	0	0	0	1	0	0	0	1	0
Grimsby Town (loan)	2008–09	League Two	3	0	0	0	0	0	1 (Note: Appearances in the Football League Trophy)	0	4	0
Aberdeen (loan)	2008–09	SPL	13	0	1	1	0	0	—		14	1
Derby County (loan)	2009–10	Championship	1	0	0	0	0	0	—		1	0
Chesterfield (loan)	2010–11	League Two	6	0	0	0	—		0	0	6	0
Panetolikos	2011–12	Super League Greece	0	0	0	0	—		—		0	0
Stockport County	2012–13	Conference Premier	4	0	0	0	—		0	0	4	0
Rochdale	2013–14	League Two	2	0	0	0	0	0	1	0	3	0
Tamworth	2014–15	Conference North	22	1	1	0	—		0	0	23	1
Wrexham	2015–16	National League	23	2	1	0	—		0	0	24	2
Guiseley	2016–17	National League	12	0	0	0	—		1 (Note: Appearances in the FA Trophy)	0	13	0
Bradford Park Avenue	2017–18	National League North	22	0	0	0	—		0	0	22	0
Career total			108	3	3	1	1	0	3	0	115	4

== Honours ==
Manchester City

- Vodacom Challenge runner-up: 2009

Chesterfield

- Football League Two champion: 2010–11
