= Kaizer Motaung Junior =

South African soccer player (born 1981)

Personal information
- Date of birth: 8 August 1981 (age 45)
- Place of birth: Johannesburg, South Africa
- Height: 1.75 m (5 ft 9 in)
- Position: Striker

Youth career
- Wits University
- Kaizer Chiefs
- Chelsea
- 1860 Munich

Senior career*
| Years | Team | Apps | (Gls) |
| 2001–2003 | 1860 Munich II | 22 | (4) |
| 2003–2014 | Kaizer Chiefs | 106 | (30) |
| Total | | 128 | (34) |

International career
| 2001–2004 | South Africa U23 | 5 | (0) |
- * Club domestic league appearances and goals

Kaizer Motaung Junior (born 8 August 1981) is a South African former professional soccer player who played as a striker. Kaizer Jr is currently a sporting director for Kaizer Chiefs F.C.

He is the son of South African soccer legend and Kaizer Chiefs founder Kaizer Motaung.

== Early life ==
Motaung was born to Kaizer and Julegka Motaung in Johannesburg, Gauteng and is one of four children. Motaung attended St. John's College, Johannesburg in Johannesburg and Harrow School in north-west London whose alumni include Winston Churchill and James Blunt. He was an excellent cricketer. In 2000, he opened batting with Middlesex and England player Nick Compton at Harrow vs Eton 163rd clash at Lord's since 1805. In that match, he got a century but the match was called off due to rain. He also played against Graeme Smith who was at King Edward High School. He was once told by Ali Bacher to play cricket. Former international referee David Alleray was his housemaster at Harrow.

== Career ==
=== Youth ===
Motaung played for Wits University and Kaizer Chiefs youth academies in South Africa and Chelsea and TSV Munich 1860 juniors in England and Germany. In his time in the Chelsea youth academy in the late 90s and early 2000s he was in the same team with Dean Furman, John Terry and Robert Huth.

=== Senior ===
Motaung was promoted to the TSV 1860 Munich reserve team and scored 1 goal in 4 matches in his debut season in the 2001–02 Oberliga Bayern season and then 3 goals in 19 matches in the 2002–03 season totaling 4 goals in 22 matches which all were diving headers. He signed with his father's club in July 2003. He made his debut on 17 December 2003 in a 4–0 win over Zulu Royals under Ted Dumitru. He scored his first goal on 9 June 2004 against Wits University. In the 2006–07 season he was the team's top goalscorer (12 goals) and Player of the Season.

== Personal life ==
He married his girlfriend of nine years, Katherine Heider in Munich in 2012, whom he was secretly engaged with for two years. His best man was former teammate at Kaizer Chiefs and current team manager, Gerald Sibeko. Heider gave birth to Tyler Rhys in 2011.
