= Abia Nale =

South African soccer player

Personal information
- Full name: Sehloho Abia Nale
- Date of birth: 5 October 1986 (age 40)
- Place of birth: Sebokeng, South Africa
- Height: 1.74 m (5 ft 9 in)
- Position: Attacking midfielder

Youth career
- Burning Spear FC
- Orlando Pirates

Senior career*
Years	Team	Apps	(Gls)
2005–2006	Manning Rangers	25	(5)
2006–2007	City Pillars	4	(1)
2007–2009	Golden Arrows	53	(9)
2009–2014	Kaizer Chiefs	81	(7)
2013	→ Ajax Cape Town (loan)	10	(3)
2013–2014	→ Mpumalanga Black Aces (loan)	20	(3)
2014–2015	Mpumalanga Black Aces	24	(2)
2015–2017	Maritzburg United	14	(0)
2017–2018	Platinum Stars	14	(0)

International career
2009	South Africa	1	(0)
- * Club domestic league appearances and goals as of 00:40, 2 January 2020 (UTC)

Abia Nale (born 5 October 1986 in Sebokeng, Gauteng) is a South African football player who plays as an attacking midfielder.
