= Reneilwe Letsholonyane =

South African former soccer player and coach(born 1982)

Personal information
- Full name: Reneilwe Letsholonyane
- Date of birth: 9 June 1982 (age 44)
- Place of birth: Soweto,Gauteng, South Africa
- Height: 1.73 m (5 ft 8 in)
- Position: Midfielder

Team information
- Current team: Mochudi Centre Chiefs (head coach)

Youth career
- Meadowlands Porto
- Kagiso Masters
- Pimville Young Stars
- Jomo Cosmos

Senior career*
Years	Team	Apps	(Gls)
2002–2003	Hellenic FC		
2003–2004	Dangerous Darkies		
2004–2006	PJ Stars	49	(8)
2006–2008	Jomo Cosmos	70	(7)
2008–2016	Kaizer Chiefs	183	(22)
2016–2018	SuperSport United	68	(4)
2019	Highlands Park	11	(0)
2020–2021	TS Galaxy	11	(0)
Total		374	(40)

International career
2008–2019	South Africa	50	(2)

Managerial career
- 2021: Pimville Young Stars
- 2022–2024: AmaZulu F.C. (youth coach)
- 2024: South Africa U20 (assistant coach)
- 2024: South Africa A (assistant coach)
- 2025–2026: Matebele FC
- 2026: F.C. Platinum (assistant coach)
- 2026–: Mochudi Centre Chiefs
- * Club domestic league appearances and goals

Reneilwe "Yeye" Letsholonyane (born 9 June 1982) is a South African former professional soccer player and current manager of Mochudi Centre Chiefs.

== Early life ==
Letsholonyane grew up kicking a rugby ball in White City, Jabavu in Soweto.

His talent blossomed at Morris Isaacson High School where he started playing for Jomo Cosmos. His parents did not believe that he could make a living from playing soccer because they knew it will be a short career, but they encouraged him anyway. His first pair of soccer boots were Puma SE Rangers that his parents bought for him.

== Playing career ==
Letsholonyane mainly played in the lower leagues until joining Jomo Cosmos in 2006.

Two years later he signed with Kaizer Chiefs under Muhsin Ertugral where he has since been an integral part of the line-up despite regularly battling injuries. Letsholonyane made his debut alongside Gordon Gilbert on 30 August 2008 in a 2–1 loss against Thanda Royal Zulu. He came close to scoring as he took a powerful shot outside the box but crashed onto the crossbar. Letsholonyane scored the winning penalty in the 2008 MTN 8 final and Chiefs won 4–3 over Mamelodi Sundowns. He got his first call-up after the final. He missed most of the 2011–12 season after picking up a knee injury on international duty, and only got featured in just 13 league matches for Chiefs. In the 2012–13 season during Chiefs' league and cup double triumph he played 26 league matches and scored three goals. Halfway through the 2013–14 season, Letsholonyane's career nearly ended against Lamontville Golden Arrows when his leg was hacked inwards, he came off and was replaced by Josta Dladla, Chiefs won 1–0. He only strained and damaged his ligaments and was ruled out for the last game of the year against AmaZulu on 22 December 2013. He scored in the MTN 8 quarter final against Mpumalanga Black Aces in the second minute in a 4–0 win and was voted Man of the Match. Letsholonyane scored his first league goal of 2014–15 in a 2–1 win over Mpumalanga Black Aces. He scored in the MTN8 second leg semi-final against Platinum Stars in the 57th minute to give Chiefs a 4–0 aggregate lead on 24 August 2014, he won his second Man of the Match of the tournament. Letsholonyane scored in a 2–0 win over Platinum Stars on 27 August 2014. He scored a brace against University of Pretoria on 13 September 2014 in a 2–1 win. He scored an equaliser in a 1–1 draw against Moroka Swallows on 22 October 2014.

On 1 July 2021, Letsholonyane announced his retirement from professional football.

Letsholonyane made his senior South Africa debut in 2008. He made his debut in September 2008 against Malawi in Germiston. He scored the second goal in a 5–0 win over Guatemala on 31 May 2010. He played at the 2010 FIFA World Cup and the 2013 African Cup of Nations. He earned his 50th cap in a 2015 African Cup of Nations qualifier in a 2–1 win over Sudan.

== Managerial career ==
Letsholonyane started his coaching career at Pimville Young Stars after buying shares in the club post his retirement.

In August 2023 he was announced as the Amazulu U23 side coach in the PSL Reserve League. He previously coach their U17 side for a season.

He was appointed head coach of relegation threated Matebele FC in the Botswana Premier League. He nominated for coach of the season after his club avoided relegation and ended ninth on the log.

In 2026 he was the assistant coach to Thabo Senong at Zimbabwean side FC Platinum.

In September 2026 he returned to the Botswana Premier League as head coach of Mochudi Centre Chiefs.

== Personal life ==
His younger brother Ruben is a soccer player. He lives in Fourways, Johannesburg. “Life in the suburbs is somewhat lonely. Everyone minds his own business. You hardly ever see neighbours chatting over the fence. “I miss the feeling that exists in the townships of being a member of one big family. Asking for a loan of sugar, washing powder or salt from the neighbour when your own runs out,” he said. Letsholonyane's father, Andrew Ramogangwane Letsholonyane died on 16 February 2015 at the age of 59.

== Career statistics ==
=== International goals ===
Scores and results list South Africa's goal tally first, score column indicates score after each Letsholonyane goal.

List of international goals scored by Reneilwe Letsholonyane
No.	Date	Venue	Opponent	Score	Result	Competition
1	31 May 2010	Peter Mokaba Stadium, Polokwane, South Africa	Guatemala	2–0	5–0	Friendly
2	15 November 2013	Somhlolo National Stadium, Lobamba, Swaziland	Swaziland	2–0	3–0	Friendly

== Honours ==
Kaizer Chiefs

- Premier Soccer League: 2012–13, 2014–15
- MTN 8: 2008, 2014
- Telkom Knockout: 2009, 2010
- Telkom Charity Cup: 2010
- Nedbank Cup: 2013
- Carling Black Label Cup: 2013

SuperSport United

- MTN 8: 2017
- Nedbank Cup: 2016–17
