= December Ngobeni =

South African soccer player

Personal information
- Full name: December Ngobeni
- Date of birth: 18 December 1975 (age 50)
- Place of birth: Giyani, South Africa
- Position: Midfielder

Team information
- Current team: Hanover Park F.C.
- Number: 69

Senior career*
Years	Team	Apps	(Gls)
2001–2007	Platinum Stars		
2008–2009	Hanover Park		
- * Club domestic league appearances and goals

December Ngobeni (born 18 December 1975) is a South African former soccer player.
