= Josta Dladla =

South African soccer player (born 1979)

Personal information
- Full name: Josta Shimane Dladla
- Date of birth: 13 July 1979 (age 47)
- Place of birth: Soweto, South Africa
- Height: 1.74 m (5 ft 9 in)
- Positions: Right winger; striker

Youth career
- Birch Acres
- Wits University

Senior career*
Years	Team	Apps	(Gls)
1999–2002	Wits University	80	(17)
2002–2004	AGF	62	(9)
2004–2009	Mamelodi Sundowns	99	(13)
2009–2015	Kaizer Chiefs	102	(9)
2015–2016	Moroka Swallows	17	(0)

International career
2002–2006	South Africa	6	(0)
- * Club domestic league appearances and goals

Josta Dladla (born 13 July 1979) is a South African football (soccer) midfielder. He was capped six times for South Africa. He is the host of "Izinja zeGame", a YouTube soccer podcast.

== Early life ==
Dladla was born in Soweto in 1979 and lived with his grandmother. His first pair of boots were the Puma Jomo Sono King, given to him by a family friend in 1986. He attended Tsugang Primary School in Soweto. His father worked in England and he boarded a flight for the first time when he was in Grade 8, in 1995, when he went to visit him during the December holidays.

== Club career ==
Dladla joined Wits in 1999 while in high school and wore number 21, earning R1000,00 a month. Dladla made his professional debut against AmaZulu in a 1–1 draw on 19 December 1999. Dladla received attention for his playmaking prowess, and was eventually sold to AGF Aarhus at the end of the 2001-2002 campaign. He made his debut two weeks later, scoring in a 4–3 win over Viborg, helping them to their first win in a month. Fellow countryman Sibusiso Zuma also scored for his club against Esjberg. Dladla, by Danish newspapers was said to have outshined Zuma, Dladla also went on to say "What's all this fuss about Sibusiso Zuma? I'm better than him!". He played his last match for Aarhus against the same team he debuted against Viborg FF on 29 May 2004 losing 2–0. He joined Mamelodi Sundowns in 2004, where he scored 15 goals in 122 appearances and won the SAA Supa8, Nedbank Cup and two league titles. He played his debut on 7 February 2009 in a 2–1 loss over Moroka Swallows. He scored his first goal on 29 November 2011 in a 3–0 win over Bidvest Wits from a solo run from the centre into the box in the 90th minute.

== Statistics ==
=== Club ===
Club performance
Season	Club	League apps	League goals
1999–00	Wits University	15	1
2000–01	Wits University	34	7
2001–02	Wits University	31	9
2001–02	AGF Aarhus	5	1
2002–03	AGF Aarhus	26	5
2003–04	AGF Aarhus	31	3
2004–05	Mamelodi Sundowns	18	0
2005–06	Mamelodi Sundowns	23	5
2006–07	Mamelodi Sundowns	23	2
2007–08	Mamelodi Sundowns	26	5
2008–09	Mamelodi Sundowns	9	1
2008–09	Kaizer Chiefs	9	0
2009–10	Kaizer Chiefs	27	4
2010–11	Kaizer Chiefs	23	0
2011–12	Kaizer Chiefs	19	4
2012–13	Kaizer Chiefs	17	1
2013–14	Kaizer Chiefs	7	0
2014–15	Kaizer Chiefs	0	0
Career total		343	48

== International career ==
Dladla was the 138th player to be capped for South Africa after isolation. He earned six caps, all as a substitute.

== Personal life ==
Dladla has a tattoo from his wrist to his shoulder on the right arm. He has body art called a sleeve and has the names of his wife, Thato and his son, Xavier who was born in 2006.

== Style of play ==
Danish soccer writer, Hans Christian Blem stated that Dladla is Very quick and has excellent technique. Stuart Baxter said the following in a Citypress interview comparing Dladla to Ryan Giggs. "We wouldn't extend his contract if we didn't think he would become the Ryan Giggs of Chiefs, Josta can play wide, central, off the strikers and Josta shows that he has Giggs' resilience. He can be a substitute, start the match and still be a team player.
