= Erwin Isaacs =

South African soccer player

Personal information
- Full name: Erwin Bradley Isaacs
- Date of birth: 21 December 1986 (age 39)
- Place of birth: Cape Town, South Africa
- Height: 1.67 m (5 ft 6 in)
- Position: Right back

Youth career
- Milano United
- Engen Santos

Senior career*
Years	Team	Apps	(Gls)
2003–2012	Engen Santos	158	(51)
2012–2015	Bidvest Wits	27	(2)
2015	→ Ajax Cape Town (loan)	11	(3)
2015–2018	Ajax Cape Town	61	(1)

International career
2011	South Africa	1	(0)
- * Club domestic league appearances and goals as of 21 March 2018

Erwin Isaacs (born 21 December 1986 in Cape Town, Western Cape) is a South African association football who most recently played for Ajax Cape Town as a right back.

Isaacs primarily plays as a central attacking midfielder but can also play as a second striker or winger on either side. He specializes in taking free-kicks and clean, powerful striking of the ball.

== Local career ==
Isaacs spent nine years at Santos F.C. South Africa. During his time at Santos, Isaacs admitted to faking injuries to avoid games.

== International career ==
He made his debut for South Africa in 2011 and has so far been capped once.

== Personal ==
He hails from Lavender Hill, Cape Town.
