= Gerald Sibeko =

South African soccer player

Personal information
- Full name: Gerald Sibusiso Sibeko
- Date of birth: 6 July 1979 (age 47)
- Place of birth: Soweto, South Africa
- Height: 1.68 m (5 ft 6 in)
- Position: Central midfielder

Youth career
- Meadowlands Professionals
- Transnet School of Excellence
- Kaizer Chiefs

Senior career*
Years	Team	Apps	(Gls)
2000–2012	Kaizer Chiefs	187	(10)
- * Club domestic league appearances and goals as of 5 August 2012

Gerald Sibeko (born 6 July 1979, in Soweto, Gauteng) is a former South African football (soccer) player who played as a midfielder.

== Early career ==
Sibeko started playing soccer at Meadowlands Professionals wearing no.6. He played as defender or midfielder. His first boots were Puma SE Rangers.

== Club career ==
Sibeko is a product of the School of Excellence and the Kaizer Chiefs Academy. He made his debut against Tembisa Classic on 15 October 2000 and scored his first goal the on 31 May 2001 against Manning Rangers. He spent his entire career at Kaizer Chiefs in the Premier Soccer League.

== International career ==
Sibeko had not played for any junior national team or senior national team but got a call-up in 2008 under Joel Santana prior to the Confederations Cup. "If Sibeko is in form, why shouldn’t we call him up even though he has never played for Bafana before? We selected him on the good form that he has been showing at Chiefs. His age doesn’t matter, but what counts is how well he is playing at his club. "His club mate David Mathebula has also been playing very well at Chiefs, but we couldn’t call both of them because they possess a bit of similar qualities. People have to understand that there are many players worthy of playing for Bafana but at the moment we believe in the ones that we have called up," said Pitso Mosimane.

== Style of play ==
Sibeko was master of short passing and was also deadly on set pieces

== See also ==
- List of one-club men
