= Elphus Mathebula =

South African politician

Member of the National Assembly of South Africa
- In office 22 May 2019 – 28 May 2024
- Constituency: Mpumalanga

Personal details
- Born: Elphus Fani Mathebula
- Party: African National Congress

Elphus Fani Mathebula is a South African politician who served as a Member of the National Assembly of South Africa for the African National Congress from 2019 until 2024.

== Background ==
Mathebula has a certificate in Management Development for Finance from the University of the Witwatersrand, a Certificate in Executive Leadership Municipal Development from the University of Pretoria and a Certificate in Provincial and Local Government Law from the University of South Africa. As of 2019, he is studying for a Bachelor of Laws (LLB) degree.

Mathebula was a branch convenor from 2000 to 2001. He has been an African National Congress branch chairperson from 2002 to 2011 and again since 2013. He was a South African Communist Party (SACP) branch secretary from 2005 to 2007 and a regional chairperson of the African National Congress Youth League from 2008 to 2010. He was an ANC LET coordinator from 2015 to 2016. In 2015, he was appointed to the regional task team (RTT) of the youth league.

Mathebula was an ANC councillor in the Steve Tshwete Local Municipality from 2002 to 2016, where he served as the Member of the Mayoral Committee (MMC) for Technical Services from 2006 to 2009, as the speaker of the municipal council from 2009 to 2011 and as the MMC for financial services from 2011 to 2016, when he left council.

== Parliamentary career ==
In 2019, Mathebula was elected to the National Assembly of South Africa from the ANC's Mpumalanga list. He serves on the Portfolio Committee on Public Works and Infrastructure.

Mathebula did not stand for reelection in the 2024 general election.
