= Punch Masenamela =

South African soccer player

Personal information
- Full name: Punch Jan Masenamela
- Date of birth: 17 October 1986 (age 40)
- Place of birth: Bochum, South Africa
- Height: 1.70 m (5 ft 7 in)
- Position: Left wing back

Senior career*
Years	Team	Apps	(Gls)
2008–2011	Kaizer Chiefs	34	(0)
2011–2014	Mamelodi Sundowns	36	(2)
2014–2015	Platinum Stars	12	(0)
2015–2016	Polokwane City	12	(0)
2016–2018	Baroka	21	(0)
2018–2019	Baberwa		
2019–2020	Mbabane Highlanders		
2022–2023	FC Sivutsa		

International career
2011–2012	South Africa	7	(0)
- * Club domestic league appearances and goals

Punch Jan Masenamela (born 17 October 1986) is a South African former soccer player who played as a defender. He was capped 7 times by South Africa.

== International career ==
Born in Bochum, Transvaal, Masenamela made his debut for South Africa in 2010.
