= Angelos Tsiaklis =

Cypriot footballer

Personal information
- Full name: Angelos Tsiaklis
- Date of birth: 2 October 1989 (age 37)
- Place of birth: Cyprus
- Position: Midfielder

Youth career
- Manchester City

Senior career*
Years	Team	Apps	(Gls)
	Manchester City	0	(0)
2008–2009	→ Wrexham (loan)	6	(0)
2009–2010	Wrexham	1	(0)
2010	Digenis Morphou		
2010	FC United of Manchester		
2013–2016	Enosis	38	(1)
2017–	Olympiakos Nicosia	1	(0)
- * Club domestic league appearances and goals

Angelos Tsiaklis (born 2 October 1989) is a Cypriot footballer who plays as a midfielder. A product of the Manchester City youth team, he has played mostly in the Cypriot First Division.

== Career ==
Tsiaklis came up through the Manchester City youth team to begin his career, where he won the FA Youth Cup.

In late October 2008, Tsiaklis was loaned out to Wrexham, originally for a month, which was extended for an extra month to last until 3 January 2009.

He signed for Wrexham permanently, however would only make one appearance as a permanent member of the squad.

He went on to play for Digenis Morphou, and made a brief return to the UK to play for FC United of Manchester.

He made appearances in the Cypriot First Division and Cypriot Second Division in the 2010s with Enosis and later with Olympiakos Nicosia.
