= Tlou Molekwane =

South African soccer player

Personal information
- Full name: Lawrence Tlou Molekwane
- Date of birth: 2 February 1989 (age 37)
- Place of birth: Seshego, South Africa
- Position: Right back

Youth career
- –2009: Kaizer Chiefs

Senior career*
Years	Team	Apps	(Gls)
2009–2012	Kaizer Chiefs	10	(0)
2012–2013	Bidvest Wits	2	(0)
2013–2016	Polokwane City	27	(0)
2016–2018	Bloemfontein Celtic	4	(0)
- * Club domestic league appearances and goals

Lawrence Tlou Molekwane (born 2 February 1989) is a retired South African football player, who played as right back.

== Club career ==
Born in Seshego (Limpopo), Molekwane made his debut for Kaizer Chiefs on 8 August 2009 in a 0–0 draw against Santos in the ABSA Premiership. In April 2012, Molekwane broke his foot in training and missed the remainder of the season.

Molekwane moved to Bidvest Wits on a 2-year contract in June 2012. He only made 2 league appearances for the club and was released at the end of the 2012–13 season.

Molekwane joined newly promoted Premier Soccer League team Polokwane City in August 2013.

After two operations without success, Molekwane announced his retirement in August 2019.
