= Lucas Thwala =

South African soccer player (born 1981)

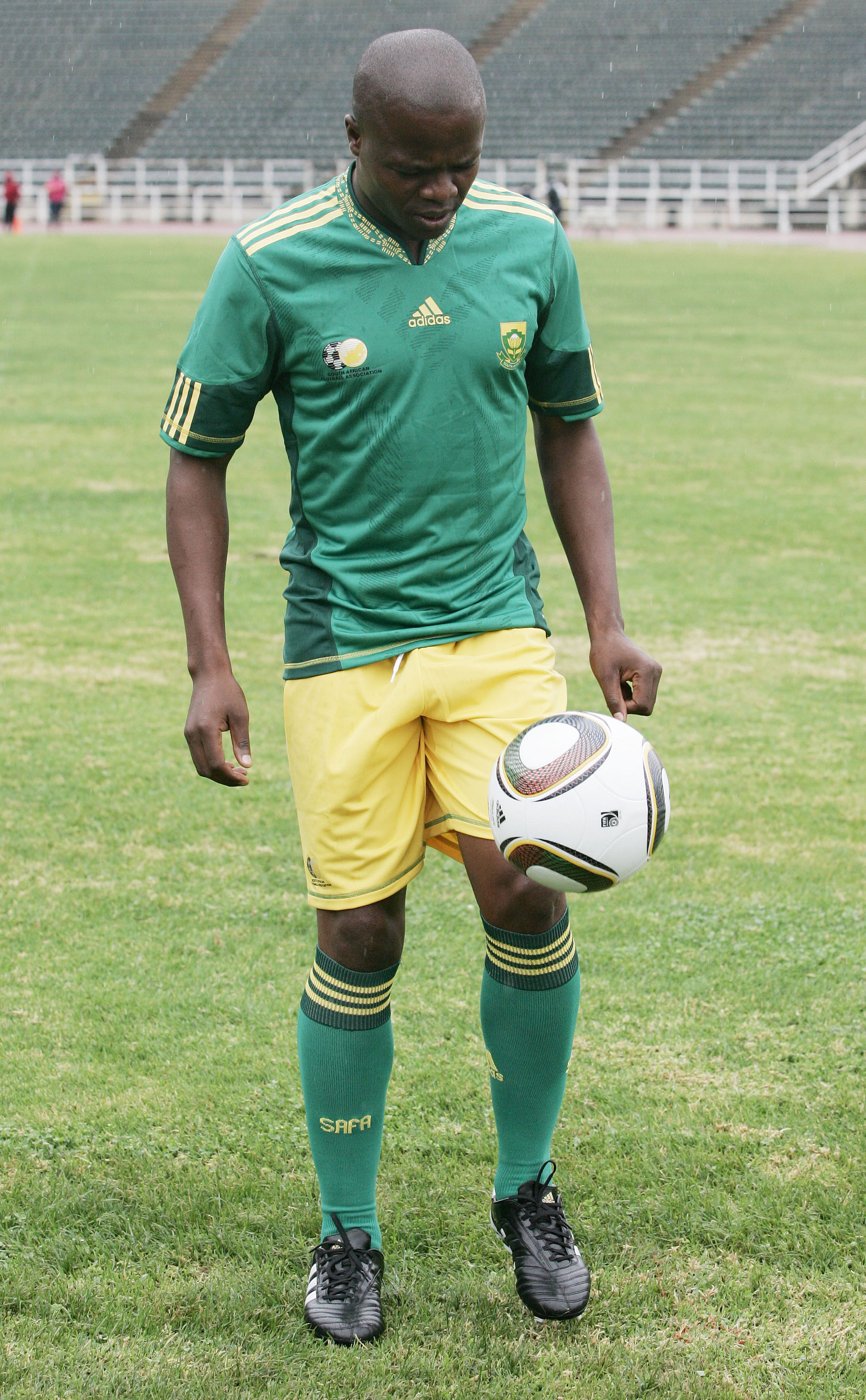

Personal information
- Full name: Lucas Bongane Thwala
- Date of birth: 19 October 1981 (age 45)
- Place of birth: Jeppes Reef, South Africa
- Height: 1.71 m (5 ft 7 in)
- Position: Left back

Youth career
- Saints
- Orlando Pirates

Senior career*
Years	Team	Apps	(Gls)
2003–2012	Orlando Pirates	90	(12)
2012	→ Platinum Stars (loan)	7	(0)
2012–2013	SuperSport United	10	(0)
Total		107	(12)

International career
2005–2010	South Africa	25	(1)
- * Club domestic league appearances and goals

Lucas Bongane Thwala (born 19 October 1981 in Nelspruit) is a retired South African football defender.

Thwala was born in Jeppe's Reef Malalane.
