= Vodacom Challenge =

- Founded: 1999
- Region: Africa (CAF) and International guest
- Current champions: Tottenham Hotspur
- Most championships: Kaizer Chiefs (5 times)
- Website: www.vodacomchallenge.com

The Vodacom Challenge was an association football pre-season tournament that featured Vodacom-sponsored South African clubs Orlando Pirates and Kaizer Chiefs plus from 2006 onwards an invited European club. Prior to 2006, the competition consisted of the two Soweto giants and two invited African clubs.

Tottenham Hotspur became the first non-African team to win the competition in 2007.

According to the tournament promoter, Jabu Mathibela the tournament was cancelled due to "time constraints" before the 2012 season would have commenced.

== Vodacom Challenge Final with African Teams ==
Year	Winners	Score	Runners up	Venue	3rd Place	Score	4th Place	Venue
1999	(South Africa); Orlando Pirates	4-1	(Tunisia); Espérance ST	Kings Park Stadium, Durban	(South Africa); Kaizer Chiefs	2-1	(Ivory Coast); ASEC	Kings Park Stadium, Durban
2000	(South Africa); Kaizer Chiefs	1-0	(South Africa); Orlando Pirates	Kings Park Stadium, Durban	(Zimbabwe); Dynamos	2-1	(Ivory Coast); Africa Sports	Kings Park Stadium, Durban
2001	(South Africa); Kaizer Chiefs	0-0; 3-2 on pens	(Ghana); Asante Kotoko	Kings Park Stadium, Durban	(Ghana); Hearts of Oak	0-0; 4-3 on Pens	(South Africa); Orlando Pirates	Kings Park Stadium, Durban
2002	(Democratic Republic of the Congo); St Eloi Lupopo	1-0	(South Africa); Kaizer Chiefs	Kings Park Stadium, Durban	(South Africa); Orlando Pirates	1-1; 8-7 on Pens	(Ghana); Asante Kotoko	Kings Park Stadium, Durban
2003	(South Africa); Kaizer Chiefs	0-0; 3-2 on pens	(Democratic Republic of the Congo); TP Mazembe	Kings Park Stadium, Durban	(South Africa); Orlando Pirates	1-0	(Democratic Republic of the Congo); St Eloi Lupopo	Kings Park Stadium, Durban
2004	(Democratic Republic of the Congo); AS Vita Club	0-0; 5-4 on pens	(South Africa); Kaizer Chiefs	Soccer City, Soweto	(South Africa); Orlando Pirates	2-1	(Democratic Republic of the Congo); TP Mazembe	Soccer City, Soweto
2005	(South Africa); Orlando Pirates	2-1	(South Africa); Kaizer Chiefs	Kings Park Stadium, Durban	(Democratic Republic of the Congo); AS Vita Club	2-1	(Zambia); Green Buffaloes	Kings Park Stadium, Durban

== Vodacom Challenge Results with European Teams ==
Year	Winners	Score	Runners up	Venue	3rd Place
2006; Details	(South Africa); Kaizer Chiefs	0-0; 4-3 on Pens	(England); Manchester United	Loftus Versfeld, Pretoria	(South Africa); Orlando Pirates
2007; Details	(England); Tottenham Hotspur	3-0	(South Africa); Orlando Pirates	Loftus Versfeld, Pretoria	(South Africa); Kaizer Chiefs
2008; Details	(England); Manchester United	4-0	(South Africa); Kaizer Chiefs	Loftus Versfeld, Pretoria	(South Africa); Orlando Pirates
2009; Details	(South Africa); Kaizer Chiefs	1-0	(England); Manchester City	Loftus Versfeld, Pretoria	(South Africa); Orlando Pirates
2010	Cancelled due to 2010 FIFA World Cup				
2011; Details	(England); Tottenham Hotspur	3-0	(South Africa); Orlando Pirates	Ellis Park, Johannesburg	(South Africa); Kaizer Chiefs
2012	Cancelled due to "time constraints".				

== Invited African clubs ==
=== 1999 ===
- (Ivory Coast) ASEC Mimosas
- (Tunisia) Esperance de Tunis

=== 2000 ===
- (Ivory Coast) Africa Sports
- (Zimbabwe) Dynamos FC

=== 2001 ===
- (Ghana) Asante Kotoko
- (Ghana) Hearts of Oak

=== 2002 ===
- (Ghana) Asante Kotoko
- (Democratic Republic of the Congo) FC St. Eloi Lupopo

=== 2003 ===
- (Democratic Republic of the Congo) TP Mazembe
- (Democratic Republic of the Congo) FC St. Eloi Lupopo

=== 2004 ===
- (Democratic Republic of the Congo) AS Vita Club
- (Democratic Republic of the Congo) TP Mazembe

=== 2005 ===
- (Democratic Republic of the Congo) AS Vita Club
- (Zambia) Green Buffaloes

== Invited European clubs ==
=== 2006 ===
- (England) Manchester United

=== 2007 ===
- (England) Tottenham Hotspur

=== 2008 ===
- (England) Manchester United

=== 2009 ===
- (England) Manchester City

=== 2011 ===
- (England) Tottenham Hotspur
