= Jeffrey Ntuka =

South African footballer

Personal information
- Full name: Pule Jeffrey Ntuka
- Date of birth: 10 May 1985
- Place of birth: Kroonstad, South Africa
- Date of death: 21 January 2012 (aged 26)
- Place of death: Kroonstad, South Africa
- Height: 1.76 m (5 ft 9 1/2 in)
- Position: Defender

Youth career
- –2003: School of Excellence
- 2003: Chelsea

Senior career*
Years	Team	Apps	(Gls)
2003–2009	Chelsea	0	(0)
2003–2008	→ Westerlo (loan)	93	(6)
2008–2010	Kaizer Chiefs	6	(1)
2010–2011	SuperSport United	8	(0)
Total		107	(6)

International career
2004–2007	South Africa	5	(0)
- * Club domestic league appearances and goals

Jeffrey Ntuka (10 May 1985 – 21 January 2012) was a South African soccer player who played at both professional and international levels as a defender.

== Career ==
=== Club career ===
Born in Kroonstad, Free State, Ntuka joined English club Chelsea in 2003 and spent five years on loan at Belgium club Westerlo, making 93 league appearances for them. Ntuka returned to South Africa in 2009, making his debut for Kaizer Chiefs in May 2009. After battling alcohol problems, Ntuka later played for SuperSport United. He was released by United in 2011.

=== International career ===
Ntuka earned five caps for South Africa between 2004 and 2007. He made his debut on 18 August 2004 in a 2–0 win over Tunisia coming in for Nasief Morris in the 88th minute. Ntuka was a member of South Africa's squad at the 2005 COSAFA Cup, but had to withdraw due to injury. He played his last match on 27 May 2006.

== Death ==
Ntuka was stabbed to death in Kroonstad during the early hours of 21 January 2012. His killer, April Jao, was sentenced to 12 years imprisonment in November 2013.
