= Dikgang Mabalane =

South African soccer player

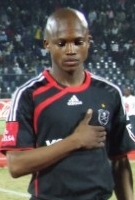

Personal information
- Date of birth: 28 December 1979 (age 46)
- Place of birth: Soweto, South Africa
- Height: 1.67 m (5 ft 6 in)
- Position: Right winger

Youth career
- Diepkloof Hellenic
- Jomo Cosmos

Senior career*
Years	Team	Apps	(Gls)
2000–2004	Jomo Cosmos	87	(2)
2004–2005	Supersport United	27	(2)
2006	Maritzburg Classic	12	(2)
2006–2008	Jomo Cosmos	59	(6)
2008–2012	Orlando Pirates	73	(5)
2012–	Moroka Swallows	88	(1)

International career
2003	South Africa	1	(0)
- * Club domestic league appearances and goals

Dikgang Mabalane (born 28 December 1979 in Soweto) is a South African association football right-winger who last played for Moroka Swallows.

He is nicknamed "Terminator" in South Africa due to his pace.
