= Thembile Kanono =

South African soccer player

Personal information
- Full name: Thembile Joseph Kanono
- Date of birth: 30 June 1980 (age 46)
- Place of birth: Thaba Nchu, South Africa
- Height: 1.85 m (6 ft 1 in)
- Position: Central midfielder

Youth career
- Small Brothers
- City Brothers

Senior career*
Years	Team	Apps	(Gls)
–2003	Bloemfontein Celtic		
2003–2008	Engen Santos		
2008–2009	Orlando Pirates	7	(1)
2009–	Bloemfontein Celtic	13	(1)
- * Club domestic league appearances and goals

Thembile Kanono (born 30 June 1980 in Thaba Nchu) is a South African football (soccer) midfielder.
