= Thela Ngobeni =

South African footballer

Personal information
- Date of birth: 4 February 1989 (age 37)
- Place of birth: Katlehong, South Africa
- Height: 1.77 m (5 ft 10 in)
- Position: Goalkeeper

Team information
- Current team: Swallows
- Number: 17

Youth career
- 2008: Kaizer Chiefs Youth

Senior career*
| Years | Team | Apps | (Gls) |
| 2008–2012 | Kaizer Chiefs | 1 | (0) |
| 2013–2019 | Mamelodi Sundowns | 2 | (0) |
| 2016–2017 | → Free State Stars (loan) | 25 | (0) |
| 2018 | → Free State Stars (loan) | 1 | (0) |
| 2019–2020 | Highlands Park | 9 | (0) |
| 2020- | Swallows | 10 | (0) |

International career
| 2009 | South Africa U20 | 1 | (0) |
- * Club domestic league appearances and goals as of 13 June 2023

Thela Ngobeni (born 4 February 1989) is a South African footballer who plays as a goalkeeper for Premier Soccer League club Swallows.

== Career ==
Thela Ngobeni has played for many Premier Soccer League clubs including The Free State Stars, Mamelodi Sundowns and Kaiser Chiefs. Thela had to join Highland Park as he was not usually included in the squad of Mamelodi Sundowns.

== Career statistics ==
As of match played 23 August 2021

Appearances and goals by club, season and competition
| Club | Season | League | | | National Cup | | League Cup | | Continental | | Other | | Total | |
| Club | Season | Division | Apps | Goals | Apps | Goals | Apps | Goals | Apps | Goals | Apps | Goals | Apps | Goals |
|---|---|---|---|---|---|---|---|---|---|---|---|---|---|---|
| Kaizer Chiefs | 2009–10 | South African Premier Division | 1 | 0 | 0 | 0 | 0 | 0 | 0 | 0 | 0 | 0 | 1 | 0 |
| Kaizer Chiefs | 2010–11 | South African Premier Division | 0 | 0 | 0 | 0 | 0 | 0 | 0 | 0 | 0 | 0 | 0 | 0 |
| Kaizer Chiefs | 2011–12 | South African Premier Division | 0 | 0 | 0 | 0 | 0 | 0 | 0 | 0 | 0 | 0 | 0 | 0 |
| Kaizer Chiefs | Total | | 1 | 0 | 0 | 0 | 0 | 0 | 0 | 0 | 0 | 0 | 1 | 0 |
| Mamelodi Sundowns | 2012–13 | South African Premier Division | 0 | 0 | 0 | 0 | 0 | 0 | 0 | 0 | 0 | 0 | 0 | 0 |
| Mamelodi Sundowns | 2013–14 | South African Premier Division | 1 | 0 | 0 | 0 | 0 | 0 | 0 | 0 | 0 | 0 | 1 | 0 |
| Mamelodi Sundowns | 2014–15 | South African Premier Division | 1 | 0 | 0 | 0 | 0 | 0 | 0 | 0 | 0 | 0 | 1 | 0 |
| Mamelodi Sundowns | 2018–19 | South African Premier Division | 0 | 0 | 0 | 0 | 0 | 0 | 0 | 0 | 0 | 0 | 0 | 0 |
| Mamelodi Sundowns | Total | | 2 | 0 | 0 | 0 | 0 | 0 | 0 | 0 | 0 | 0 | 2 | 0 |
| Free State Stars (loan) | 2016–17 | South African Premier Division | 25 | 0 | 1 | 0 | 3 | 0 | 0 | 0 | 0 | 0 | 29 | 0 |
| Free State Stars (loan) | 2017–18 | South African Premier Division | 1 | 0 | 5 | 0 | 0 | 0 | 0 | 0 | 0 | 0 | 6 | 0 |
| Free State Stars (loan) | Total | | 26 | 0 | 6 | 0 | 3 | 0 | 0 | 0 | 0 | 0 | 35 | 0 |
| Highlands Park | 2019–20 | South African Premier Division | 9 | 0 | 0 | 0 | 1 | 0 | 0 | 0 | 4 (Note: Appearance(s) in MTN 8) | 0 | 14 | 0 |
| Swallows F.C. | 2020–21 | South African Premier Division | 2 | 0 | 1 | 0 | 0 | 0 | 0 | 0 | 0 | 0 | 3 | 0 |
| Career total | | | 37 | 0 | 7 | 0 | 4 | 0 | 0 | 0 | 4 | 0 | 52 | 0 |
