= Javier Garrido =

Spanish association football player

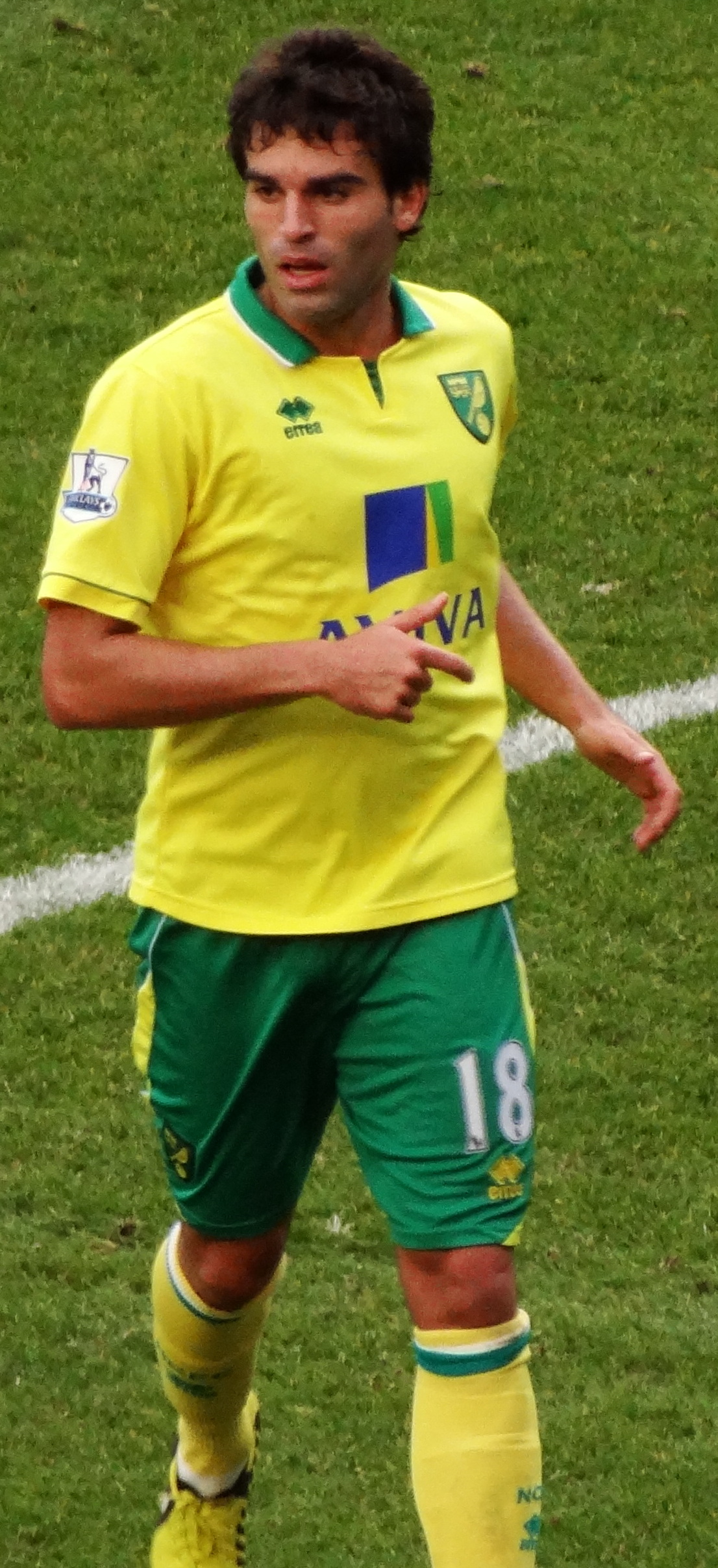
- Garrido playing for Norwich City in 2012

Personal information
- Full name: Javier Garrido Behobide
- Date of birth: 15 March 1985 (age 41)
- Place of birth: Irun, Spain
- Height: 1.78 m (5 ft 10 in)
- Position: Left back

Youth career
- Real Sociedad

Senior career*
Years	Team	Apps	(Gls)
2001–2004	Real Sociedad B	44	(1)
2004–2007	Real Sociedad	86	(1)
2007–2010	Manchester City	49	(2)
2010–2013	Lazio	21	(0)
2012–2013	→ Norwich City (loan)	34	(0)
2013–2015	Norwich City	13	(0)
2015–2016	Las Palmas	18	(0)
2016–2017	AEK Larnaca	22	(1)
2018–2020	Real Unión	34	(0)
Total		321	(5)

International career
2001–2002	Spain U17	13	(0)
2004	Spain U19	9	(0)
2005	Spain U20	2	(0)
2005–2006	Spain U21	9	(0)
2006–2016	Basque Country	5	(0)
- * Club domestic league appearances and goals

Javier Garrido Behobide (born 1 July 1985) is a Spanish former professional footballer who played as a left back.

Formed at Real Sociedad, he made 104 La Liga appearances for that club and for Las Palmas. Abroad, he represented Manchester City and Norwich City in the Premier League, and Lazio in Serie A.

== Club career ==
=== Real Sociedad ===
Born in Irun, Basque Country, Garrido signed for Real Sociedad when he was a child and continued his training at the lower levels of the club. Between 2002 and 2004, he was part of the players of Real Sociedad B, where he played 50 games for this team in the Second Division B.

He made his debut with the first team in a Copa del Rey match on 8 October 2003 with a 2–1 win against Real Oviedo. His professional career began in 2004 when he became a part of the first team in the 2004–05 season to replace Agustín Aranzábal, who had left the club in the summer transfer window for Real Zaragoza. He made his league debut against Levante UD on 29 August 2004. In his three seasons in La Liga, he played 86 games and scored 1 goal and being the most used left-back for Sociedad in those three seasons. He left due to his team's economical problems following their relegation in 2006–07.

=== Manchester City ===
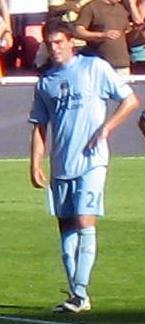
Garrido playing for Manchester City in 2007.

On 2 August 2007, Garrido signed for Manchester City for £1.5m (€2.2 million), on a four-year contract. He made his debut nine days later against West Ham United, and played a part in the most successful Premier League start in the club's history with four victories and four clean sheets from the opening six games, but was replaced by Michael Ball halfway through the campaign. His team eventually ended in the ninth place in the league and qualified for the UEFA Cup through fairplay.

Garrido scored his first goal for City direct from a free kick against Liverpool in their 3–2 loss on 5 October 2008. In his second season at the City of Manchester Stadium he made 13 league appearances, 14 fewer than the first.

During his third season in England, following Manchester City's takeover, Garrido was third choice to Wayne Bridge and Sylvinho as left back. In the Manchester derby, in which United won 4–3, Garrido, as an unused substitute in the match, was struck on the head by a coin as he headed down the tunnel at half-time. After the match, he made accusations against United, describing the club's actions as a 'climate of hostility'. However, this changed when Roberto Mancini replaced Mark Hughes as City manager, he came off the bench against Stoke City on 26 December to gain only his first league appearance of the 2009–10 season; two days later he came on for Stephen Ireland against Wolverhampton Wanderers and scored a free kick. After leaving City, Garrido said he had no feud with Mancini, saying he was grateful to him when he gave him a chance to play in the first team.

=== Lazio ===
On 30 July 2010, Garrido joined Lazio – just days after Aleksandar Kolarov went in the opposite direction – on a four-year deal, for the fee of €2.2 million (£1.5 million). He made his debut on 14 November as a substitute in a 2–0 win over Napoli. Eleven days later he scored his first goal in the fourth round of the Coppa Italia match, a 3–0 win against AlbinoLeffe. Shortly afterwards, he suffered an Achilles tendon problem, nit returning until the following 6 March. Under manager Edoardo Reja, Garrido found it difficult to make it to the first team.

The next season, Garrido was barely used for the club in the first half of the season, due to muscular problems, at first, and then strain in mid-March. He made his first appearance of the season, as Lazio lost 3–2 against Genoa on 5 February 2012.

=== Norwich City ===
On 16 August 2012, Garrido joined Norwich City on a season-long loan, with an option to extend it beyond the 2012–13 season. The move was complete after his international clearance was granted and he was given the number 18 shirt. Upon joining Norwich, Garrido told BBC Radio Norfolk that joining the club was an easy decision to make.

Garrido made his debut on 25 August in a 1–1 draw against Queens Park Rangers, and he beat Marc Tierney to the Canaries' regular left back position and established himself in the first team. In a match against Manchester United on 17 November, Garrido crossed the ball for a header by Anthony Pilkington for the only goal of the game. In late December, Garrido stated he would like to stay at Norwich. On 14 May 2013, Norwich announced they had agreed to sign Garrido on a permanent deal to join the club from 1 July on a two-year contract, with an option for another year.

=== Later career ===
On 7 August 2015, Garrido signed a 1+1 contract with UD Las Palmas, newly promoted to the top tier, thus returning to Spain after eight years. On 31 May of the following year, after avoiding relegation, he was released. In August 2016, he signed a two-year deal at AEK Larnaca of the Cypriot First Division.

In July 2018, Garrido returned to his hometown and signed with third-tier Real Unión; he had been training with the club for a year, but was injured in January. Two years later, when the club did not give him a new contract, he retired; the sudden end of the season in March due to the COVID-19 pandemic meant he could not bid farewell.

== International career ==
Garrido played for Spain U-19 where he won the 2004 edition of UEFA European Under-19 Championship. He also earned four caps for Spain U-21.

Garrido played for the Basque Country against Serbia, Estonia and Corsica from 2006 to 2016.

== Career statistics ==
As of 18 August 2014

Appearances and goals by club, season and competition
Club	Season	League			National Cup		League Cup		Continental		Total	
Club	Season	Division	Apps	Goals	Apps	Goals	Apps	Goals	Apps	Goals	Apps	Goals
Real Sociedad	2004–05	La Liga	28	0	0	0	–		0	0	28	0
Real Sociedad	2005–06	La Liga	33	0	0	0	–		0	0	33	0
Real Sociedad	2006–07	La Liga	25	1	0	0	–		0	0	25	1
Real Sociedad	Total		86	1	0	0	0	0	0	0	86	1
Manchester City	2007–08	Premier League	27	0	0	0	0	0	–		27	0
Manchester City	2008–09	Premier League	13	1	0	0	2	0	4	0	19	1
Manchester City	2009–10	Premier League	9	1	0	0	0	0	0	0	9	1
Manchester City	Total		49	2	0	0	2	0	4	0	55	2
Lazio	2010–11	Serie A	10	0	1	1	–		0	0	11	1
Lazio	2011–12	Serie A	11	0	0	0	–		0	0	11	0
Lazio	Total		21	0	1	1	0	0	0	0	22	1
Norwich City (loan)	2012–13	Premier League	34	0	1	0	0	0	–		35	0
Norwich City	2013–14	Premier League	6	0	2	0	2	0	–		10	0
Norwich City	2014–15	The Championship	1	0	0	0	0	0	–		1	0
Norwich City	Total		7	0	2	0	2	0	0	0	11	0
Career total			197	3	4	1	4	0	4	0	209	4

== Honours ==
Spain U19

- UEFA U-19 Championship: 2004
