= Irvin Mhlambi =

South African footballer

Irvin Sello Mhlambi (born 17 August 1984) is a South African football striker. He currently formerly played for the Premier Soccer League club Orlando Pirates. In August 2010 he joined the First Division side African Warriors.

- Joined Pirates: 2007
- Previous clubs: Benoni Premier United, Maritzburg City
