= David Mathebula =

South African soccer player (born 1983)

Personal information
- Full name: David Lyborn Mathebula
- Date of birth: 24 June 1983 (age 43)
- Place of birth: Elim, South Africa
- Height: 1.69 m (5 ft 7 in)
- Position: Midfielder

Youth career
- Basani Arrow Chiefs
- Hlanganani Try Again
- Chipeya Sports Academy
- Orlando Pirates

Senior career*
Years	Team	Apps	(Gls)
2002–2004	Dynamos	24	(3)
2004–2011	Kaizer Chiefs	79	(9)
2011	→ Black Aces (loan)	16	(3)
2011–2013	Moroka Swallows	52	(11)
2013–2017	SuperSport United	63	(3)
2017–2018	Tshakhuma	22	(3)

International career
2013	South Africa	2	(0)

Managerial career
- 2018–2019: Tshakhuma (assistant)
- 2019: Black Aces
- 2019: Tshakhuma (assistant)
- * Club domestic league appearances and goals

David Mathebula (born 24 June 1983) is a retired South African football player who played as midfielder.

== Coaching career ==
Retiring in the summer 2018, Mathebula was appointed an assistant coach to Sello Chokoe at Tshakhuma. He left the club in January 2019 and was then appointed manager of Black Aces in February 2019.

On 1 October 2019, Mathebula returned to Tshakhuma as an assistant coach on an interim basis under caretaker manager Phuthi Mohafe until a suitable replacement for Moma Medic was found following his sacking. Only eight days later, Erol Akbay was appointed new manager of the club and it was reported, that Mathebula's future was unclear.
