= Manchester City F.C. ownership and finances =

Manchester City Football Club dates back to 1894, when Ardwick A.F.C. dissolved and was reformed as Manchester City Football Club Ltd. Over recent years, the state of ownership and finances of Manchester City Football Club has been tumultuous, featuring various owners of contrasting fortunes, in line with the club's inconsistent trend on the pitch. The club is currently owned by the City Football Group (CFG), a holding company with the majority stake owned by the Abu Dhabi United Group. A smaller consortium of owners from the United States and China collectively owns 24%.

Since 1 September 2008, the club has been majority owned by Sheikh Mansour, one of football's wealthiest owners, who has an estimated individual net worth of at least £17 billion and a family fortune of about $300 billion. Mansour is the current vice president and deputy prime minister of the United Arab Emirates, as well as a member of the ruling Al Nahyan family. The CITIC Group, which acquired a 13.79% stake of the club's parent company, the CFG, for £265 million in 2015, valued it at $3 billion.

== Current overview ==
=== Level of financial power ===
Since the Robinho shock signing on the transfer deadline day in September 2008, the club have been branded "the richest club in the world" by the media and the Robinho signing heralded a new era of spending for the club with Sheikh Mansour willing to invest in the club off the pitch and on it by signing new players.

Having spent in approximately £320m on transfers from the arrival of Sheikh Mansour in September 2008 to September 2010 it was reported that owner Sheikh Mansour had earmarked £500m for transfers – regardless of any revenue during that two-year period. The report highlighted the club's immense spending power, meaning as of September 2010 there was a surplus transfer budget of around £175m after the transfer window of summer 2010. Since September 2010 up to September 2011, approximately a further £100m has been spent, but with players being sold this is around £80 to 85m in net expenditure.

=== Board ===
As of 21 August 2015

| Position | Name |
|---|---|
| Chairman | (United Arab Emirates) Khaldoon Al Mubarak |
| Director | (China) Ruigang Li |
| Non-Executive Director | (England) Simon Pearce |
| Non-Executive Director | (United States) Marty Edelman |
| Non-Executive Director | (United Arab Emirates) Mohamed Al Mazrouei |
| Non-Executive Director | (England) John Macbeath |
| Non-Executive Director | (Italy) Alberto Galassi |

Since September 2008, the club is owned fully by Sheikh Mansour. Khaldoon Al Mubarak has been Chairman since September 2008, when he took over from previous owner, Thaksin Shinawatra.

Garry Cook has been Chief Executive Officer since July 2008, after he was previously one of Nike Inc. top hierarchy. His tenure at the club has been marked by improvement in facilities for supporters, players, and staff, but one marred by numerous gaffes.

Brian Marwood has been Football Administration Officer since March 2009. Then manager Mark Hughes was concerned about the club bringing someone in a Director of Football role and thus Football Administration Officer was the title given instead. Its main role signing transfer targets, whilst improving the club's infrastructure off the pitch.

Increase in revenue since 2004
| Season | Revenue | Change | Deloitte Money League |
|---|---|---|---|
| 2004–05 | €90.1m | Steady | 17 |
| 2005–06 | €89.4m | ▼€0.7m | 17 |
| 2006–07 | €84.6m | ▼€4.8m | N/A |
| 2007–08 | €104m | ▲€19.4m | 20▲ |
| 2008–09 | €101.2m | ▼€2.8m | 19▲ |
| 2009–10 | €144m | ▲€42.8m | 11▲ |
| 2010–11 | €168m | ▲€24m | 12▼ |
| 2011–12 | €285.6m | ▲€117.6m | 7▲ |
| 2012–13 | €316.2m | ▲€30.6m | 6▲ |
| 2013–14 | €414.4m | ▲€98.2m | 6 |
| 2023–24 | €837.8m | | 2▲ |

=== Financial structure ===
The club posted a loss of £92.5 million for the fiscal year ending 31 May 2009, up from £32.5 million in May 2008. Under the new ownership, the club embarked on a complete transformation of the club by acquiring new players such as Carlos Tevez, Robinho, David Silva, Yaya Touré and Mario Balotelli, while improving training facilities.

== Future Eastlands redevelopment – Etihad Campus ==
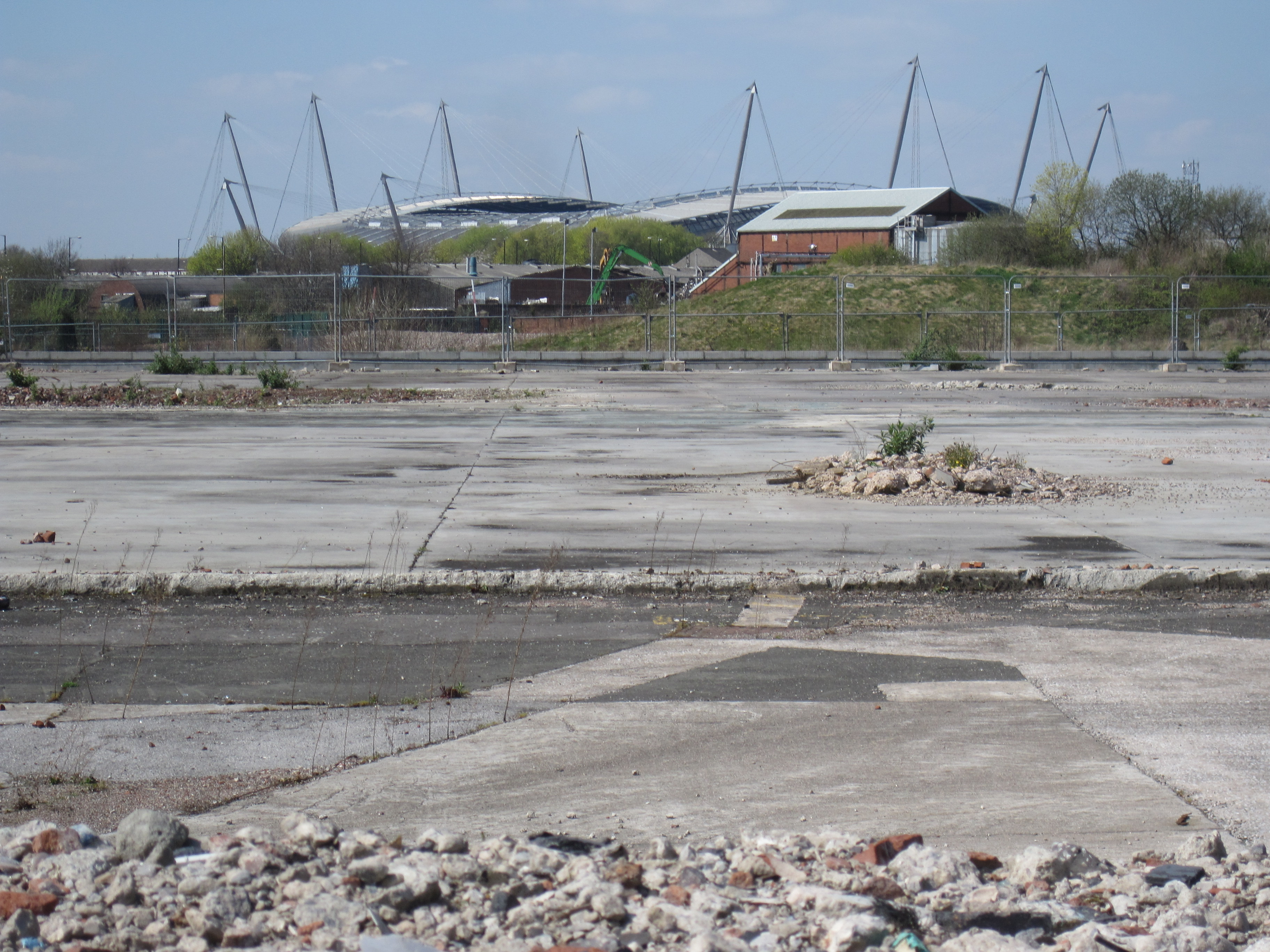
Empty land in Openshaw West. The club partly owns 200 acres of land around East Manchester and 70 acres of land were purchased by Manchester City from Wolverhampton Wanderers chairman Steve Morgan in December 2009.

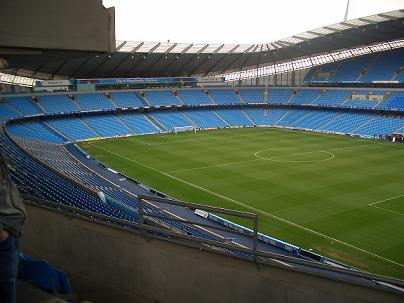
Expansion to at least 60,000 would be achieved by adding a third tier to the north and south stands behind the goals

In March 2010, the club signed an initial agreement with Manchester City Council and the New East Manchester Agency to explore alternative leisure attraction proposals to replace the doomed Supercasino, which was originally planned to be built next to Eastlands. Furthermore the agreement of understanding gave the club permission to build and expand the new facilities it wishes to build.

In July 2011, it was announced the area where the developments will be built will be called the Etihad Campus. In return Etihad Airways will pay sponsorship to Manchester City F.C. for ten years, and for Manchester City Council who own the stadium, Etihad will create a British hub for Etihad Airways at Manchester Airport creating further jobs and helping to fuel the £600m Manchester Airport City project. When complete, revenue from the Etihad Campus will go towards helping the club meet the new Uefa Financial Fair Play Regulations

=== New training complex ===
The club is currently planning to move from its current Carrington Training Centre complex to east Manchester nearby the City of Manchester Stadium. The new training complex will be based on A.C. Milan's Milanello training complex, which is understood to be one of top training complexes in world football. It is believed the new £50m million training facility will house all aspects of the playing staff as the youth academy will be moved from its current site in Platt Lane to join the new training complex.

=== Leisure complex ===
Preliminary preparation began in April 2010 with remiadiation of the 17 acres (69,000 m^{2}) of empty land around the Eastlands stadium.

=== Stadium expansion and lease renegotiation ===
After increasing tickets figures and a sell out all 36,000 season tickets for the 2010–11 season, the club has explored options for increasing the stadium's capacity. The stadium is currently leased to Manchester City and the owners are believed to want to buy the stadium outright

The lease on the stadium was renegotiated in October 2010, with Manchester City paying Manchester City Council a flat base rate of £3 million a year rather than the council taking half of the revenue of ticket sales over 35,000. This previous system earned the council approximately £2 million a year, whereas the new, higher £3 million single payment agreement signals the club are looking to expand the stadium. The agreement is linked to Manchester City's willingness to "considering potential development as part of a contribution to the regeneration of east Manchester", proposals that are being planned.

== History ==
Manchester City chairmen
| When | Name |
|---|---|
| before 1904 | John Chapman (first spell) |
| 1904–1905 | Waltham Forrest |
| 1905–1906 | John Allison |
| 1906–1914 | W.A. Wilkinson |
| 1914–1920 | John Chapman (second spell) |
| 1920–1928 | Lawrence Furniss |
| 1928–1935 | Albert Hughes |
| 1935–1954 | Bob Smith |
| 1954–1956 | Walter Smith |
| 1956–1964 | Alan Douglas |
| 1964–1971 | Albert Alexander Jr. |
| 1971–1972 | Eric Alexander |
| 1972–1994 | Peter Swales |
| 1994–1998 | Francis Lee |
| 1998–2003 | David Bernstein |
| 2003–2007 | John Wardle |
| 2007–2008 | Thaksin Shinawatra |
| 2008–present | Khaldoon Al Mubarak |

=== 1894–1972 ===
The modern day Manchester City Football Club became a registered limited company on 16 April 1894. Shares in the club were owned by a number of club figures, who all had one share each. The first Chairman was John Chapman, a local publican. Edward Hulton, an early board member and influential newspaper owner in the early 20th Century, took charge after City were relegated in 1902. In the 1920s Lawrence Furniss was Chairman, he had served the club in various capacities since playing for them when the club was still Gorton AFC in the mid-1880s.

After the end of hostilities in the mid-1940s the Chairman was Robert Smith. In the mid-50s Walter Smith became Chairman before Alan Douglas took over between 1956 and 1964. Douglas stepped down due to ill health, allowing the Alexander family to gain control.

Albert Alexander Jr., son of the man who had founded the Manchester City Academy in the 1920s was chairman during the 1960s. The start of the 1970s saw a boardroom power struggle. At its heart was the relationship between Joe Mercer and Malcolm Allison. With Mercer as manager and Allison as coach, the club had experienced the most successful period in its history. However, Allison sought greater control, as he felt as coach he was "constantly being patted on the head". In November 1970 it became known that vice-chairman Frank Johnson was willing to sell most of his shareholding. Joe Smith, the owner of a double-glazing business in Oldham, attempted to gain a controlling stake in the club. Together with four others, including Simon Cussons of the Cussons soap-making family, he formed a pro-Allison faction — one that Allison claimed in his autobiography to have initiated himself. The Alexander family wished to keep Mercer as manager. When Frank Johnson realised the effect selling to Smith would have, he chose not to sell.

Smith and Cussons gained places on the board in 1971. In October, Allison took sole charge of the first team, and Mercer became "general manager". By November 1971 Albert Alexander's age and declining health had become a factor. His son Eric took over as chairman, becoming the youngest chairman in the Football League, and Albert was given the title of President.

=== Swales era, 1973–1994 ===
At the start of the 1973–74 season Eric Alexander announced his intention to step down in October. Minority shareholder Peter Swales positioned himself as a unifying figure acceptable to both Joe Smith's faction and longstanding directors such as Eric Alexander and John Humphreys (who was also managing director of Umbro). Swales was elected as chairman, and held the position for more than 20 years. Swales time in charge was one of impatience with him sacking eleven Manchester City managers in 21 years, however he had reputation as a generous chairman when providing money for transfer Swales was remembered for his gaffe with manager Malcolm Allison after Swales sanctioned the purchase of Steve Daley from Wolves for £1,450,000, a then British transfer fee record. Daley turned out to be a flop, and Allison always claimed that he had agreed a much lower fee with the then Wolves manager for Daley. Allison later claimed Swales intervened on a chairman to chairman basis and secured the transfer instantly but at a much higher, possibly rip-off price.

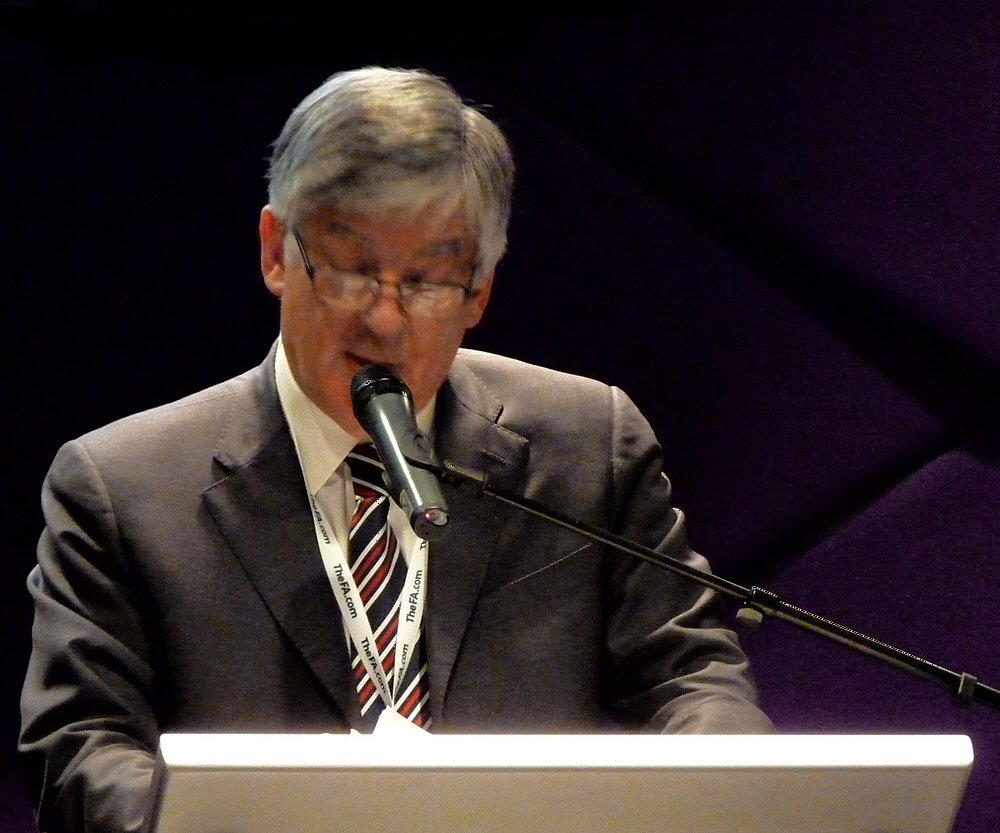
David Bernstein, Manchester City chairman from 1998 to 2003

After over 20 years of frustration delivering little success, Swales fell out of favour with the Manchester City supporters who led a long anti-Swales campaign. Momentum gathered in the 1990s, in the form of a movement named Forward With Franny, backing former City player Francis Lee's attempt to gain control of the club.

In 1994, with Swales was ousted from his chairmanship by former City player Francis Lee, whose paper business F. H. Lee Ltd. had made him a multimillionaire. Lee gained control of the club by purchasing £3 million of shares at a price of £13.35 per share.

Swales was offered a role as life president at the club upon his departure but he never returned to Maine Road. It was a sad departure for a chairman who loyally invested large sums of money into Manchester City in search of new success and greater parity with a resurgent Manchester United. Swales died on 3 May 1996, three days before a now yoyo club, Manchester City were relegated from the top tier of English football.

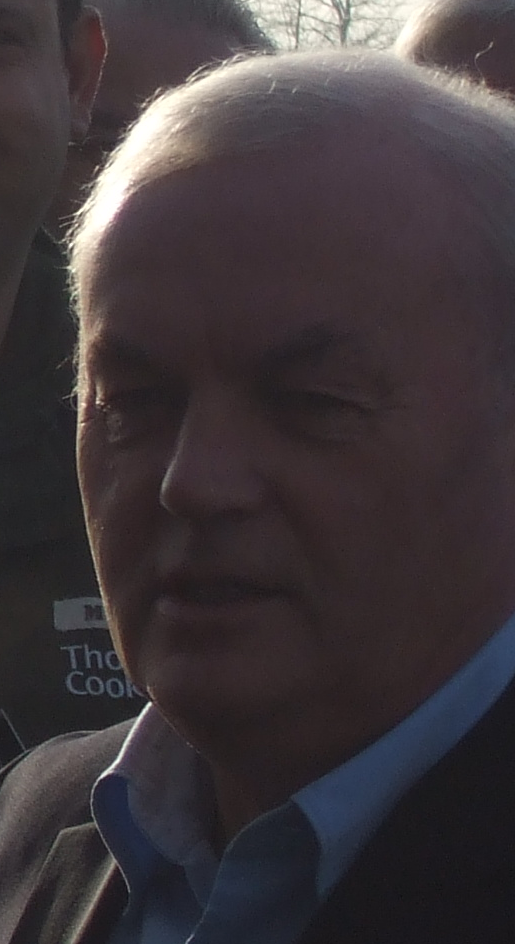
Chairman between 2003 and 2007 – John Wardle

=== Lee, Bernstein and Wardle (1994–2007) ===
Upon becoming Chairman, Lee made a series of extravagant claims about his plans for the club, announcing that, "This will be the happiest club in the land. The players will be the best paid and we'll drink plenty of champagne, celebrate and sing until we're hoarse." The club floated on the OFEX exchange in 1995, valuing the club at £8 million.

In 1996, Lee appointed his friend Alan Ball as Manager, but the appointment proved unsuccessful and the club was relegated. Both Ball and Lee stated later that Swales had left the club with catastrophic debts that had undermined their plans. Lee stepped down in 1998, with the club on the brink of relegation to the third tier of English football, a fate that Lee had dismissed at the previous annual general meeting by saying that he would "Jump off the Kippax" if the club was relegated. He was replaced as Chairman by Financial Director David Bernstein.

Chairman Franny Lee tried to new investors into the club, one of which was Saudi billionaire Prince Walid who was interested in making a £75m investment in 1996, but Lee refused to show Walid the club accounts and Walid cooled his interest. City shareholders also attempted to woo Wigan chairman Dave Whelan into investing in the club, but City's precarious position without a manager at the time did not convince Whelan.

In November 1999, broadcasting company BSkyB purchased a 9.9% stake in the club for £5.5 million, plus a further sum for media rights. The deal was part of a series of acquisitions by BSkyB, which included a similar stake in Leeds United. A share rights issue announced at the same time as the BSkyB purchase saw JD Sports founders John Wardle and David Makin increase their stake and become the club's largest shareholders.

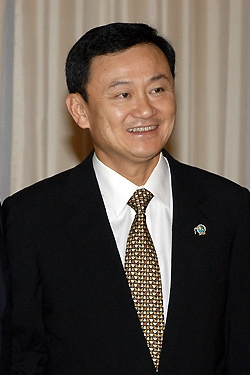
Former owner and chairman between 2007 and 2008, Thaksin Shinawatra

Bernstein resigned on 5 March 2003, believing that differences of opinion regarding player transfers had undermined his ability to lead the club. Bernstein had favoured a fiscally conservative transfer policy, but manager Kevin Keegan and major shareholder John Wardle wished to spend heavily on new players, such as Robbie Fowler. Wardle became Temporary Chairman, taking the position on a permanent basis two months later. Bryan Bodek, who had been a board member since February 2000, was appointed as his deputy.

=== Thaksin Shinawatra (2007) ===
In December 2006, the club issued a statement regarding a possible takeover, prompting press speculation about potential buyers. On 24 April, former City player Ray Ranson announced interest in making an offer for the club, though the club denied press reports that a bid had been made. On 1 May 2007, it was announced that deposed Thai Prime Minister Thaksin Shinawatra had been granted access to the club's accounts. The deal, however, was thrown into doubt when Thailand's Military Government froze £830 million of Shinawatra's assets after they investigated allegations of corruption made against him. On 21 June, the Manchester City board accepted an £81.6 million offer for the club from Thaksin Shinawatra and advised the shareholders to accept the bid. On 6 July, Thaksin finally acquired a 75% share in the club, enough to take full control of the club and delist it as full owner. One of his first moves was to schedule a press conference to announce former England manager Sven-Göran Eriksson as his new manager.

Under Eriksson they made a positive start to the season. However, City's form in the second half of the season was weak, as they finished 9th in the final table but finished with their highest ever Premier League points total and the season included double victories over rivals Manchester United. Months of speculation started in March 2008 as the season drew to a close over Eriksson's future. Manchester City fans launched a "Save our Sven (SOS)" campaign to prevent his sacking. This was to no avail as Eriksson's one-year reign as manager ended on 2 June 2008, following weeks of speculation about his future.

On 5 June 2008, Mark Hughes was unveiled as Manchester City's new manager on a three-year contract. The appointment of Hughes as manager placed a veil over Thaksin Shinawatra's endless trouble with the Thai authorities and now had his £800m fortune frozen in Thailand and did not wish to go back to Thailand to clear his name.

Throughout August 2008, media outlets claimed that the club was in complete disarray and that City were on the brink of financial meltdown with Shinawatra asking a now disillusioned former chairman John Wardle for a £2m loan and new manager Hughes threatening to resign unless finance problems were sorted out and the board stopped trying to seemingly sell Stephen Ireland and Vedran Ćorluka behind his back. Manchester City supporters were also getting restless with Shinawatra, and an "out with Shinawatra" tone was beginning to gain favour with some City fans, much in the same manner of Peter Swales departure in 1994. Rumours started to spread around the footballing world in August 2008 that Shinawatra's position as owner of the club was not viable because of his frozen financial backing and it was believed he was considering selling Manchester City to a new owner(s).

The dream of bringing back the glory era to City set out by Shinawatra just a year before now seemed unrealistic.

=== Sheikh Mansour (since 2008) ===
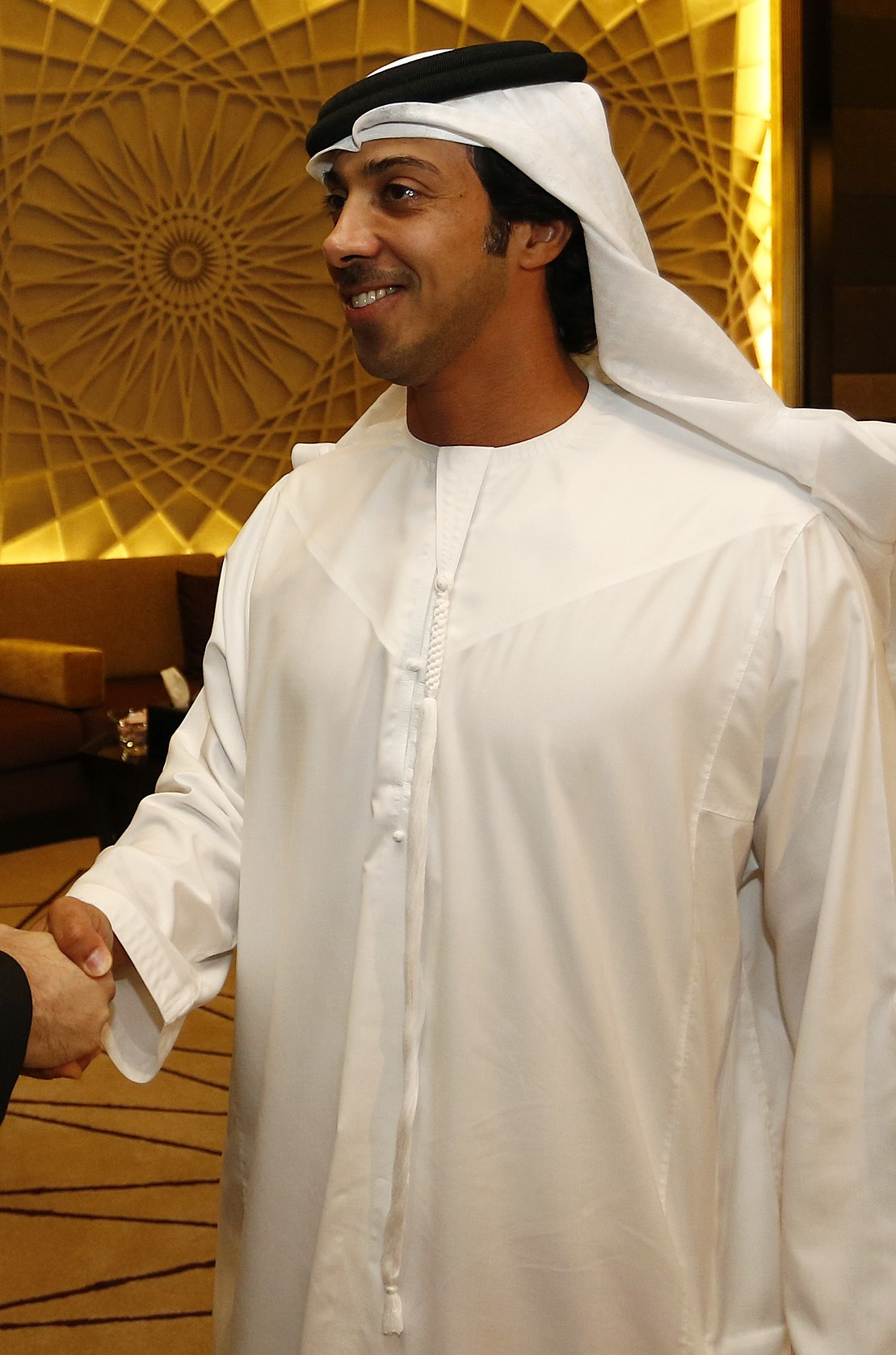
Sheikh Mansour, owner of Manchester City and the City Football Group

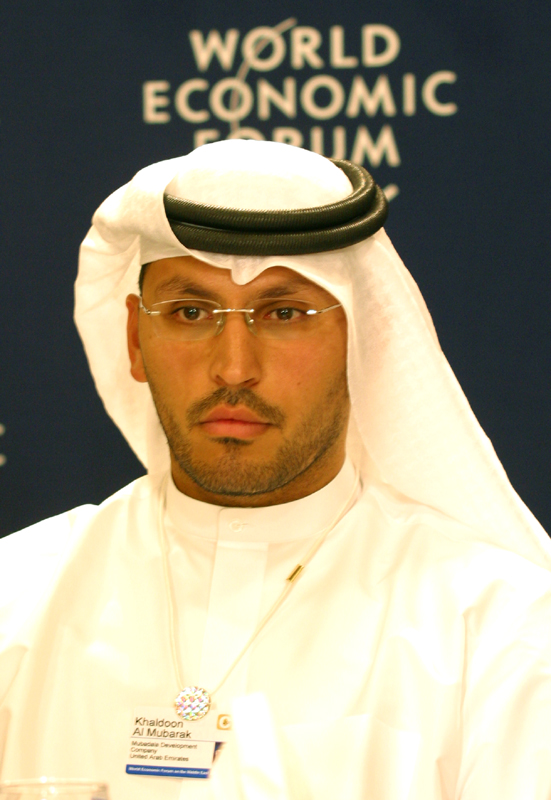
Current chairman on behalf of Sheikh Mansour since September 2008, Khaldoon Al Mubarak

In August 2008, it became increasingly likely that Thaksin would fail to retrieve his frozen assets from Thailand. His wife, Pojaman Shinawatra, was convicted of acquiring large tracts of land for grossly underpriced values and sentenced to three years imprisonment on 31 July 2008, and following this news, Thaksin's own court dates approaching, and Pojaman's bail, a visit by the Shinawatra family to the 2008 Beijing Olympics led to them using the opportunity to leave the country for London, where they then applied for political asylum in the United Kingdom. This led to the Thai courts issuing an extradition request to the British Government, and the courts beginning to try them in absentia, effectively ending any hope of the money being released and making it more likely that Thaksin would come to breach Premier League rules on club ownership, which prevent owners convicted of corruption charges from retaining control of their club.

In response to this, Thaksin offered to resign his position on the board, an offer that was rejected by Garry Cook, Manchester City's executive chairman, and also began attempting to sell minority stakes in the club for investment. After being rejected repeatedly with counter-proposals to buy majority stakes numerous, it was then announced on 1 September 2008 that the club were in talks with the Abu Dhabi United Group to sell Thaksin's entire stake, a deal to which was agreed later in the day.

As part of the takeover, Dr Sulaiman Al-Fahim, a board member of the company and the man both leading the talks and mooted to be the new chairman, promised a top four finish within three seasons, indicating that he would give a show of his intent by capturing at least one world class signing, naming such players as Robinho as in his sights, having made bids for all four on behalf of his new club. With the deal for the sale of the club going through on the last day of the summer transfer window, negotiations were forcibly limited, but while a deal for Berbatov was accepted by the club but not by the player, with a few minutes remaining in the transfer window, Manchester City were able to confirm the signing of Robinho from Real Madrid for a British transfer record £32.5 million, concurrently the seventh largest transfer fee in the history of football.

The period of due diligence ended on 21 September, with Sheikh Mansour bin Zayed Al Nahyan, owner of the Abu Dhabi United Group, and Thaksin Shinawatra agreeing the transfer of the club on 23 September. As part of their new board, Doctor Al-Fahim's presumed position of co-chairman was conspicuously filled by Khaldoon Al Mubarak instead, with Al-Fahim's loose-tongued comments about buying an all-star team cited as the reason for his demotion, his comments having produced much negative media backlash and having gone against Al Nahyan's more long-term and rather more restrained plans for the club.

In the months following the takeover, Thaksin held the position of Honorary President, but was removed from the position in February 2009 after a Thai court convicted him for corruption. The following month, the club ceased their operations in Thailand.

==== City Football Group and Chinese investment ====
Following Manchester City's success in the 2011 FA Cup Final and the 2011–12 Premier League season, Sheikh Mansour and his trusted associate Khaldoon turned their attentions to investment in foreign football leagues and announced the purchase of a Major League Soccer expansion named New York City FC in association with Hal and Hank Steinbrenner of the New York Yankees. Eyeing up further investments, they created City Football Group as a new parent company operating between the executives of the various clubs in their expanding portfolio and the board of Abu Dhabi United Group, from which all of their investments were ultimately controlled. The new organisation then set about expanding into as many fields of football as it could, encompassing football marketing, branding, sponsorship negotiations, academy operation and other football services. According to Human Rights Watch, ADUG's investment into Manchester City are intended to "construct a public relations image of a progressive, dynamic Gulf state, which deflects attention from what is really going on in the country."

As they attempted to branch out not only their investments but also their foreign brand appeal CFG turned to China in the latter half of 2015, first offering themselves as a host location for high-level business talks between the government leadership of the United Kingdom and the People's Republic of China before agreeing a £265m sale of shares to a consortium of Chinese state-backed investment firms China Media Capital and CITIC Capital. The deal made the two companies a combined 13% part-owner of CFG and therefore of Manchester City, giving in exchange a significant partnership allowing both City and CFG to expand into the Chinese market in a variety of directions.

==== European Super League ====
In April 2021, Manchester City was one of the biggest clubs to join the proposed European Super League. Many saw it as a betrayal to the supporters and fans. City's manager Pep Guardiola, who had been carrying the responsibility to make the team win the Champions League, also condemned the decision. However, many sources confirmed that Manchester City, along with fellow English club Chelsea, were manipulated into joining the European Super League, hence after extensive backlash from the fans on social media, the football authorities, the Premier League, and the UK Prime Minister Boris Johnson, the club had to reconsider their plans. Eventually, they backed out from the proposed multi-million-dollar league.
