= David Bernstein (businessman) =

British business executive (born 1943)

David Bernstein CBE
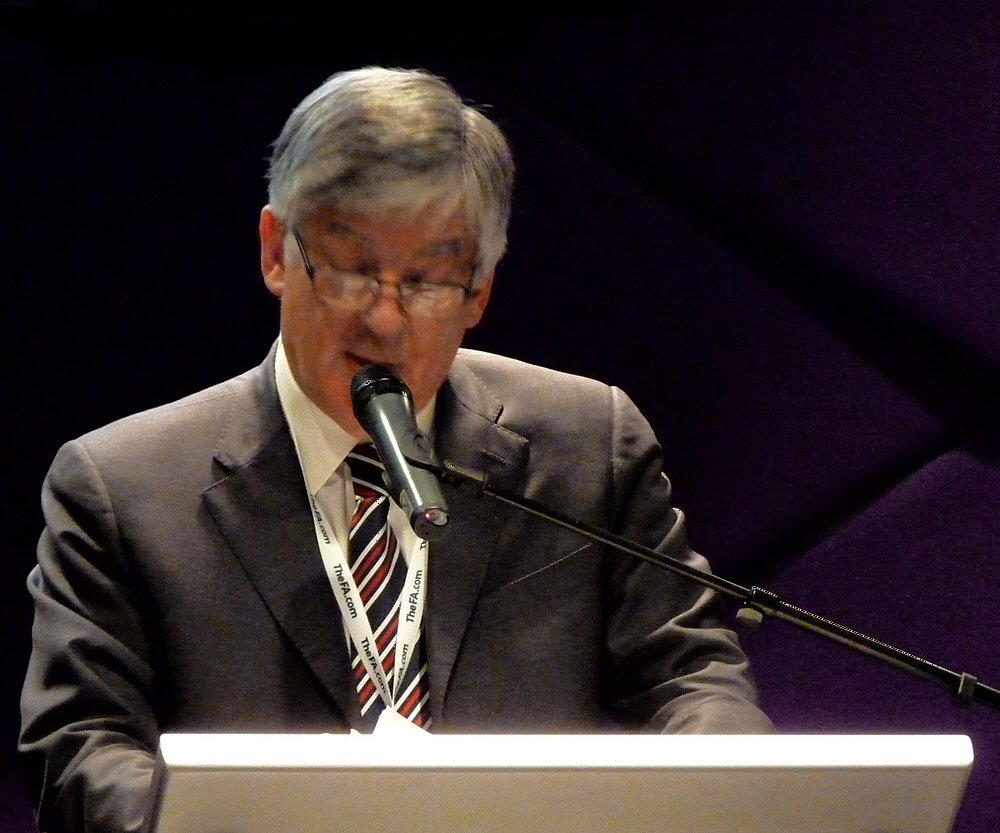
- David Bernstein in 2011
- Born: 22 May 1943 (age 83); St Helens, Lancashire, England, United Kingdom
- Occupations: Chartered accountant Chairman of The FA businessman Former Chairmen of Manchester City Football club
- Years active: 1994–present

David Alan Bernstein CBE (born 22 May 1943) is a British business executive who is the chairman of the British Red Cross, member of the advisory board at Cogress Ltd and was the former chairman of French Connection.

A Chartered Accountant by profession, Bernstein has also been involved in the footballing world and was the chairman of Manchester City F.C. from 1998 to 2003, a period of revival and stability in the club's 130-year history and is generally held in high regard by Manchester City supporters for helping to pull the club out of its nadir.

Bernstein is also president of Level Playing Field and Chair of the Centre for Access to Football in Europe. He has been chairman of Wembley Stadium Limited since July 2008, during which he has renegotiated the £341m loan that has ensured the stadium's financial future would be more manageable.

Bernstein was the FA chairman from January 2011 until his 70th birthday in May 2013, having been selected as Lord Triesman's replacement by the FA Council in December 2010. He said that his main priorities as chairman were reducing dissent and increasing respect in English football, establishing closer links with FIFA to gain greater influence in international football and enforcing a fairer playing field financially.

In December 2019, Bernstein stepped down as executive chairman of Ted Baker.

== Football interests ==
=== Manchester City ===
Bernstein began supporting Manchester City in 1954 and watched the 1956 FA Cup Final between City and Birmingham City, despite it coinciding with the day of his Bar Mitzvah. He joined Manchester City in 1994 as a board member and replaced outgoing chairman Francis Lee as chairman in 1998.

He inherited the role at a time when the once famous team of the 1960 and 70s was an ailing side plummeting into the depths of the Football League. The club reached their nadir when they were relegated to the old Football League Division Two in 1998, which was then the third tier of English football – the only time in Manchester City's 130-year history they have been in the third tier.

His spell as Manchester City chairman saw five seasons of Manchester City yo-yoing between divisions. The club returned to the Division One via the play-offs in a tense penalty shootout with Gillingham. The first season after being promoted, the club finished second in Division One and were promoted to the Premiership. However they went on to finish 18th and were subsequently relegated. Bernstein brought Kevin Keegan in as manager with the task to get City into the top flight and provide the stability to remain there. The club gained promotion in Keegan's first season in charge finishing 1st in Division One, winning by 10 clear points and scoring 101 league goals (more than two a game) for the first time since the 1957–58 season.

Bernstein departed Manchester City and was succeeded as chairman by John Wardle. The exact reason for his departure was believed to be down to "excessive spending", something Bernstein warned Manchester City to be wary of after the financial gambles Peter Swales often took to give City impetus to challenge for trophies.

==== Successes ====
However, his tenure at Manchester City is fondly looked on by Manchester City supporters, who credit Bernstein for preventing City getting stuck in the lower divisions and providing the necessary back-room clout to give the club stability, while Bernstein upon leaving City thanked his fellow City fans for their support: "I would like to thank our wonderful fans for their backing. They have been fantastic in their support, which has never wavered even during the most difficult times. I have been touched by their kindness and enthusiasm. I have supported Manchester City since I was a boy and I am desperate for us to succeed."

- Manchester City Academy – Bernstein agreed to establish an academy with Jim Cassell in charge of the programme in 1998. The academy has since garnered a reputation as one of the best in English football has produced more professional footballers than any other Premier League club.
- The club moved into a new training facility at Carrington Training Centre, whilst the academy used the old Platt Lane training ground nearby Maine Road as a new training facility
- Bernstein was heavily involved in negotiations which moved the club from Maine Road to the new 47,000 seater City of Manchester Stadium in 2003. The move secured City's long-term future and the stadium's capacity was an attractive asset for prospective owners. The 47,000 seater stadium was believed to a key reason why Sheikh Mansour chose Manchester City to buy while looking for the most suitable football club with potential to advance to the top.
- The appointment of the recent England manager, Kevin Keegan in 2001, was a coup considering the club was in Division One upon Keegan's appointment.

=== Wembley Stadium Limited ===
Bernstein took over from Michael Jeffries in July 2008, after the stadium was plagued by years of construction delays and financial mismanagement. Bernstein worked with FA secretary and fellow chartered accountant, Alex Horne and refinanced the £341m loan to secure the stadium's short-term future.

=== Football Association ===
Bernstein became chairman of the Football Association on 25 January 2011. The nomination was met with surprise, with many expecting David Dein to be promoted as chairman. However some analysts saw Bernstein as a "safe pair of hands", and pointed to business revivals with ailing companies French Connection, Manchester City and Wembley Stadium Limited that gave weight to his appointment. Bernstein was appointed Commander of the Order of the British Empire (CBE) in the 2014 New Year Honours for services to football.

==== Demands for FIFA reform ====
Bernstein's appointment as chairman followed the failed 2018 World Cup bid in December 2010. Bernstein aimed to foster better relations with the FIFA Executive Committee in an aim to enforce English influence at the top of FIFA. However, accusations of bribery and members suspended on suspicion of corruption at FIFA meant the FA and Bernstein took a tougher stance with FIFA with a demand of reform.

Ultimately, the FA abstained from the 2011 FIFA presidential election between incumbent president Sepp Blatter and Mohammed Bin Hammam. Bin Hammam was later suspended by FIFA days prior to the election and the FA demanded that the election would be postponed with only one name on the ballot paper two days prior to the election. With only a day The FA managed to get 17 football associations to support their demand. Other football associations such as Germany also vented their concern at the events unfolding at FIFA as too did FIFA sponsors.

== Business interests ==
Bernstein oversaw the controversial fcuk advertisement campaign at French Connection in 1997.

Bernstein sits on the boards of a number of public companies, including fashion label Ted Baker and restaurant chain Carluccio's. Bernstein also sits on the advisory board for property investment firm Cogress Ltd.

== See also ==
- Manchester City F.C. ownership and finances

Business positions
Preceded by Lord Triesman	The Football Association chairman 2011–2013	Succeeded by Greg Dyke
