= Blue Moon Rising (film) =

- Directed by: Stewart Sugg
- Produced by: Nick London
- Cinematography: Michael Costelloe
- Edited by: Stephen Moore
- Music by: Theo Green
- Production company: Endemol Sport
- Distributed by: Endemol
- Release date: 17 September 2010
- Running time: 97 minutes
- Country: United Kingdom
- Language: English

Blue Moon Rising is a British sport documentary film released on 17 September 2010. The film title is a play on words referring to Manchester City's fan anthem, "Blue Moon" and chronicles the fortunes of Manchester City Football Club through the 2009-2010 football season with insight from Manchester City supporters. Shot and produced by Endemol in conjunction with the club, and features exclusive interviews with staff, players, board members and fans throughout the season.

The first trailer was unveiled in August 2010 and the film is set for gradual theatrical release on a weekly basis at different cinemas across the United Kingdom commencing the week beginning 17 September 2010. The film was received mixed reactions from critics, with some citing very strong production values and realistic and humorous portrayal of football supporters and viewing accessibility for all football fans regardless of allegiance.

== Synopsis ==
The film follows Manchester City in the wake of the club's takeover by Sheikh Mansour through the 2009–2010 season, capturing their emotions in victory and defeat. Whilst the documentary will also give an "access all areas" view into Manchester City Football Club including footage from the dressing room, boardroom and players' homes such as Carlos Tevez with exclusive in-depth interviews from chairman Khaldoon Al Mubarak and manager Roberto Mancini.

=== Supporters ===
Although the film reviews the highs and lows of the 2009–10 season and the transformation of the club since September 2008, the film places heavy emphasis on the Manchester City supporters and what it means to be a football supporter. The film documents a group of Manchester City fans as they follow their team across the country in their 1995 Renault Espace nicknamed, "Helios".

== Production ==
The film is in conjunction with Manchester City increasing their brand profile and was believed to be originally a television documentary. The club also were keen to produce something different rather than an often half-made end of season DVD that is common across all football clubs in England. The film has been produced by British filmmakers, with BAFTA Award winning Stewart Sugg directing the film throughout the season.

== Release ==
The film was originally planned for release in the summer of 2010 but was delayed to autumn 2010. Endemol Worldwide Distribution are handling TV and DVD distribution following its run-out on the silver screen. The film premièred at the Manchester Printworks on 10 September 2010

The first trailer was unveiled in August 2010 and the film is set for gradual theatrical release on a weekly basis at different cinemas across the United Kingdom commencing the week beginning 17 September 2010. The film is also planned for general release from 8 November 2010.

The film was released on DVD and Blu-ray on 8 November 2010. It went to the number 1 spot in the sports DVD charts and subsequently remained in the top 10 for ten weeks.

== Reception ==
Reception to the film was extremely positive. It was praised for its portrayal of the Manchester City supporters and what it means to be a football supporter rather than over-emphasis on the journey throughout the season. The film's production values proclaimed, for instance real on-pitch sound effects were captured and were combined with sound effects to make the action more appealing to a cinematic audience and a deeper insight into football for followers. The club itself were also praised for setting a precedent in abandoning a typical half-made end of season DVD review for supporters and instead giving real value by producing a cinematic release that gives the film meaning by following passionate supporters. The Times praised it as "Entertaining, funny, at times poignant". Time Out described the film as "Very tense and strangely entertaining... a fascinating 90 minutes." However, a review in The Guardian, however, criticised the film for a lack of depth and nuance saying it "might as well have been devised by a Nuts focus group".

== See also ==
- Manchester City Football Club
- There's Only One Jimmy Grimble
