= 2008–09 Manchester City F.C. season =

English football club season

Manchester City
2008–09 season
- Owner: Abu Dhabi United Group
- Chairman: Thaksin Shinawatra (until the sale of club on 1 September 2008); Khaldoon Al Mubarak (from 1 September 2008)
- Manager: Mark Hughes
- Stadium: City of Manchester Stadium
- Premier League: 10th
- FA Cup: Third round
- League Cup: Second round
- UEFA Cup: Quarter-finals
- Top goalscorer: League: Robinho (14); All: Robinho (15)
- Highest home attendance: 47,331 vs Chelsea; 13 September 2008
- Lowest home attendance: 7,334 vs EB Streymur; 31 July 2008
- Average home league attendance: 42,900 approx.
Home colours	Away colours	Third colours

The 2008–09 season was Manchester City Football Club's seventh consecutive season playing in the Premier League, the top division of English football, and its twelfth season since the Premier League was first created with Manchester City as one of its original 22 founding member clubs. Overall, it was the team's 117th season playing in a division of English football, the majority of which have been spent in the top-flight.

== Changes in ownership ==
The club started the season under the private ownership of UK Sports Investments Limited (UKSIL), a company controlled by former Thailand prime minister Thaksin Shinawatra, but it was announced on the morning of Monday 1 September 2008 (the last day of the summer transfer window) that Abu Dhabi-based Abu Dhabi United Group Investment and Development Limited (ADUG) had completed a takeover of Manchester City in a deal worth a reported £200 million. This transaction made Sheikh Mansour bin Zayed Al Nahyan the new owner of the club, although initially he kept a very low profile and Dr. Sulaiman Al-Fahim, who was the board member of ADUG that had presided over the signing of the deal at the Emirates Palace Hotel, was widely believed to be the new owner and potential chairman of the club. However, before the takeover was finally completed, wealthy backer Mansour bin Zayed Al Nahyan became more prominent and it was eventually made clear that Al-Fahim would not be joining the board at Manchester City, with Khaldoon Al Mubarak being appointed as the club's new chairman.

The last-minute takeover of the club on transfer "deadline-day" was further capped, mere minutes before the summer transfer window closed, with the news that the club had beaten Chelsea to the signing of Robinho from Real Madrid for a British record transfer fee of £32.5 million.

== Kits ==
Supplier: Le Coq Sportif / Sponsor: Thomas Cook

Home	Home alt.	Home alt. 2	Away	Third	Third alt.	Goalkeeper 1	Goalkeeper 2	Goalkeeper alt. 2

=== Kit information ===
For this season the shirt sponsor for all of the club's kits continued to be the previous season's sponsor, Thomas Cook, while the team kits were produced by the previous season's supplier, Le Coq Sportif. The home and away kits were unveiled by the club on 27 June 2008, with the new away kit representing a more modern rendition of the club's highly popular red and black striped shirts and black shorts that had first been introduced as a club kit by Malcolm Allison back in 1968 in imitation of A.C. Milan's classic colors. A striking new "blaze orange"/navy third kit completed the collection of kits, while the team's main home strip shed the previous season's thin white vertical stripes from the shirts and returned to the solid sky blue shirts that are more traditionally associated with the team. As well as all three of the team kits being new this season, the previous season's two-tone green goalkeeper strip was also replaced with two new strips for the goalkeepers. The main goalkeeper strip, intended primarily for use with the home team colours, sported an all gold shirt trimmed with black on the shoulders and sides with matching all black shorts and socks, whilst the second mint-green strip, with the shirts similarly trimmed in black, was introduced to supplement it on both home and away fixtures.

== Historical league performance ==
Prior to this season, the history of Manchester City's performance in the English football league hierarchy since the creation of the Premier League in 1992 is summarised by the following timeline chart – which commences with the last season (1991–92) of the old Football League First Division (from which the Premier League was formed).

== Friendly games ==
=== Pre-season ===
9 July 2008	Metalurh Zaporizhya	0–0	Manchester City	Rottach-Egern, Germany
		MCFC report

26 July 2008	Hamburger SV	1–0	Manchester City	Hamburg, Germany
15:30 BST (Away team kit)	Pitroipa 17'	M.E.N. report		Stadium: Hamburg Arena; Attendance: 32,737

2 August 2008	Stockport County	2–2	Manchester City	Stockport, England
13:00 BST (Away team kit & GK strip 1)	Pilkington 65'; Thompson 86'	MCFC report	77' Bojinov; 90' (pen.) Evans	Stadium: Edgeley Park; Attendance: 6,684; Referee: K.G. Evans

6 August 2008	Celtic	1–1	Manchester City	Glasgow, Scotland
19:45 BST (Away team kit)	McGowan 78'	MCFC report	53' Petrov	Stadium: Celtic Park; Referee: Craig Thomson

==== Thomas Cook Trophy ====
9 August 2008	Manchester City	1–0	Milan	Manchester, England
17:15 BST (Home v1 team kit & GK strip 1)	Bojinov 37'	MCFC report		Stadium: City of Manchester Stadium; Attendance: 25,181; Referee: Mark Halsey (England)

== Competitive games ==
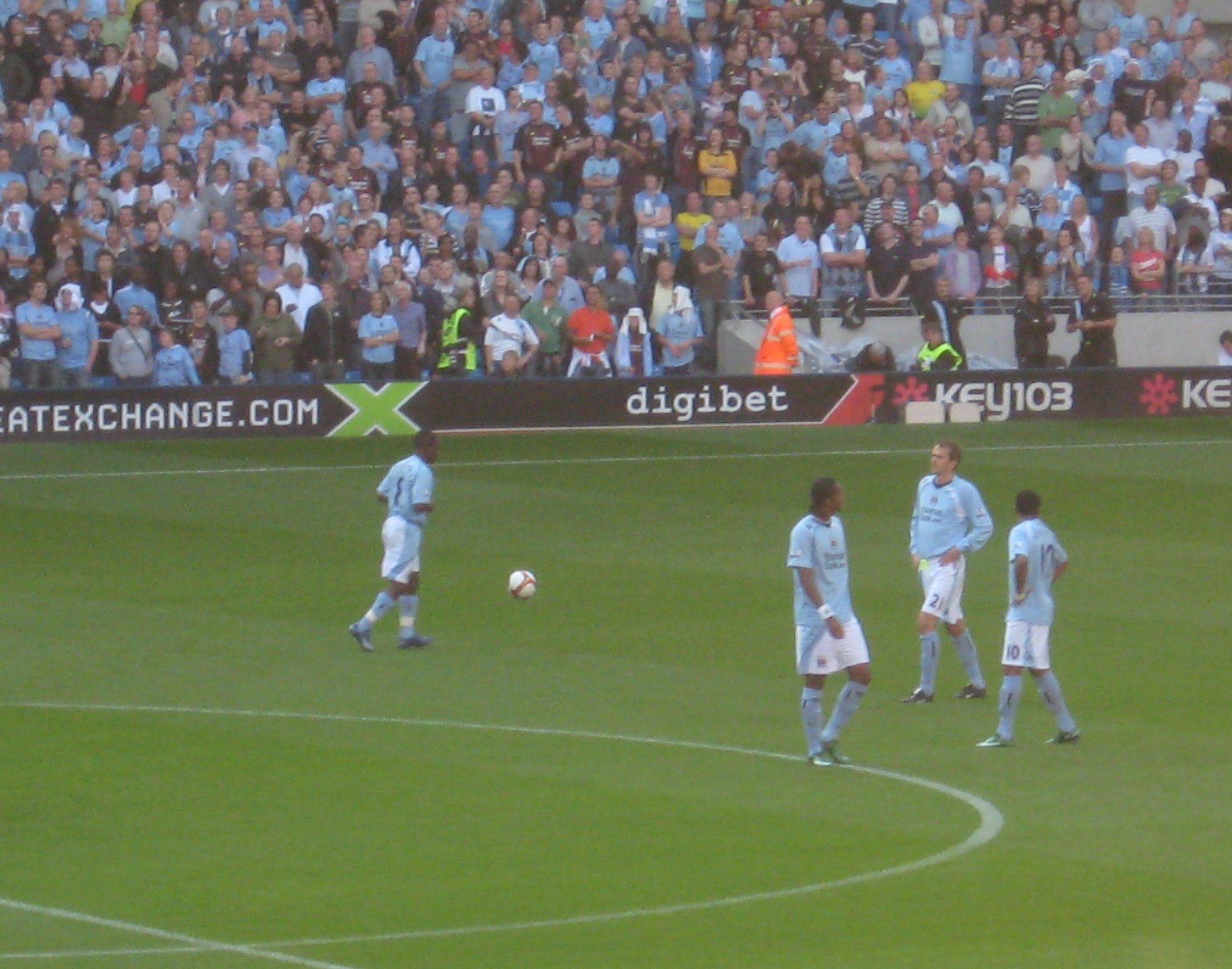
Shaun Wright-Phillips, Jô, Dietmar Hamann and Robinho (l-r) prior to the match against Chelsea on 13 September in which Robinho made his debut.

=== Premier League ===
==== Position in final standings ====
Pos	Team	Pld	W	D	L	GF	GA	GD	Pts
8	Tottenham Hotspur	38	14	9	15	45	45	0	51
9	West Ham United	38	14	9	15	42	45	−3	51
10	Manchester City	38	15	5	18	58	50	+8	50
11	Wigan Athletic	38	12	9	17	34	45	−11	45
12	Stoke City	38	12	9	17	38	55	−17	45

Source: Barclays Premier League
Rules for classification: 1) points; 2) goal difference; 3) number of goals scored.

==== Results summary ====
Overall								Home						Away					
Pld	W	D	L	GF	GA	GD	Pts	W	D	L	GF	GA	GD	W	D	L	GF	GA	GD
38	15	5	18	58	50	+8	50	13	0	6	40	18	+22	2	5	12	18	32	−14

Last updated: 24 May 2009 (end of season).
Source: Premier League results 2008–09

==== Points breakdown ====
Points at home: 39
Points away from home: 11

Points against "Big Four" teams: 4
Points against promoted teams: 10

6 points: Sunderland
4 points: Blackburn Rovers, Hull City, Newcastle United
3 points: Arsenal, Aston Villa, Bolton Wanderers, Everton, Middlesbrough,

Portsmouth, Stoke City, West Brom., West Ham United, Wigan Athletic

1 point: Fulham, Liverpool
0 points: Chelsea, Manchester United, Tottenham Hotspur

==== Biggest & smallest ====
Biggest home win: 6–0 vs. Portsmouth, 21 September 2008
Biggest home defeats: 1–3 vs. Chelsea, 13 September 2008 & vs. Fulham, 12 April 2009
Biggest away win: 0–3 vs. Sunderland, 31 August 2008
Biggest away defeats: 4–2 vs. Aston Villa, 17 August 2008
2–0 vs. Middlesbrough, 29 October 2008 & vs. Bolton Wanderers, 2 November 2008
& vs. Portsmouth, 14 February 2009 & vs. Arsenal, 4 April 2009
& vs. Manchester United, 10 May 2009
Biggest home attendance: 47,331 vs. Chelsea, 13 September 2008
Smallest home attendance: 36,635 vs. West Ham United, 24 August 2008
Biggest away attendance: 75,464 vs. Manchester United, 10 May 2009
Smallest away attendance: 18,214 vs. Wigan Athletic, 28 September 2008

==== Results by round ====
Round	1	2	3	4	5	6	7	8	9	10	11	12	13	14	15	16	17	18	19	20	21	22	23	24	25	26	27	28	29	30	31	32	33	34	35	36	37	38
Ground	A	H	A	H	H	A	H	A	H	A	A	H	A	H	H	A	H	A	H	A	H	H	A	H	A	A	A	H	A	H	A	H	H	A	H	A	A	H
Result	L	W	W	L	W	L	L	D	W	L	L	L	D	W	L	D	L	L	W	D	W	W	L	W	L	D	L	W	L	W	L	L	W	W	W	L	L	W
Position	18	8	4	7	5	9	11	10	8	8	10	13	12	11	15	14	17	18	15	13	15	12	9	10	9	10	11	8	10	10	10	11	10	9	8	10	10	10

Updated to match(es) played on 24 May 2009 (end of season). Source: worldfootball.net
A = Away; H = Home; W = Win; D = Draw; L = Loss

==== Individual match reports ====
17 August 2008 1	Aston Villa	4–2	Manchester City	Birmingham, England
15:00 BST (Third v1 team kit & GK strip 1)	Carew 47'; Agbonlahor 69', 74', 76'	BBC Sport report Guardian report	64' (pen.) Elano; 89' Ćorluka	Stadium: Villa Park; Attendance: 39,955; Referee: Phil Dowd (Staffordshire)

24 August 2008 2	Manchester City	3–0	West Ham United	Manchester, England
16:00 BST (Home v1 team kit & GK strip 1)	Sturridge 65'; Elano 70', 76'	BBC Sport report Guardian report		Stadium: City of Manchester Stadium; Attendance: 36,635; Referee: Howard Webb (South Yorkshire)

31 August 2008 3	Sunderland	0–3	Manchester City	Sunderland, England
15:00 BST (Home v1 team kit & GK strip 1)		BBC Sport report Guardian report	45' Ireland; 50', 58' Wright-Phillips	Stadium: Stadium of Light; Attendance: 39,622; Referee: Chris Foy (Merseyside)

13 September 2008 4	Manchester City	1–3	Chelsea	Manchester, England
17:30 BST (Home v1 team kit & GK strip 2a)	Robinho 13'	BBC Sport report Guardian report	16' Carvalho; 53' Lampard; 69' Anelka	Stadium: City of Manchester Stadium; Attendance: 47,331; Referee: Mark Halsey (Lancashire)

21 September 2008 5	Manchester City	6–0	Portsmouth	Manchester, England
15:00 BST (Home v1 team kit & GK strip 1)	Jô 13'; Dunne 20'; Robinho 57'; Wright-Phillips 68'; Evans 78'; Fernandes 83'	BBC Sport report Guardian report		Stadium: City of Manchester Stadium; Attendance: 40,238; Referee: Alan Wiley (Staffordshire)

28 September 2008 6	Wigan Athletic	2–1	Manchester City	Wigan, England
16:00 BST (Away team kit & GK strip 2a)	Valencia 16'; Zaki 34' (pen.)	BBC Sport report Guardian report	22' Kompany	Stadium: JJB Stadium; Attendance: 18,214; Referee: Steve Bennett (Kent)

5 October 2008 7	Manchester City	2–3	Liverpool	Manchester, England
15:00 BST (Home v1 team kit & GK strip 1)	Ireland 19'; Garrido 41'	BBC Sport report Guardian report	55', 73' Torres; 90+1' Kuyt	Stadium: City of Manchester Stadium; Attendance: 47,280; Referee: Peter Walton (Northamptonshire)

20 October 2008 8	Newcastle United	2–2	Manchester City	Newcastle upon Tyne, England
20:00 BST (Home v1 team kit & GK strip 2a)	Ameobi 44'; Dunne 63' (o.g.)	BBC Sport report Guardian report	14' (pen.) Robinho; 86' Ireland	Stadium: St James' Park; Attendance: 45,908; Referee: Rob Styles (Hampshire)

26 October 2008 9	Manchester City	3–0	Stoke City	Manchester, England
15:00 GMT (Home v1 team kit & GK strip 1)	Robinho 14', 47', 72'	BBC Sport report Guardian report		Stadium: City of Manchester Stadium; Attendance: 44,624; Referee: Steve Tanner (Somerset)

29 October 2008 10	Middlesbrough	2–0	Manchester City	Middlesbrough, England
20:00 GMT (Home v1 team kit & GK strip 1)	Alves 53' (pen.); O'Neil 90+4'	BBC Sport report Guardian report		Stadium: Riverside Stadium; Attendance: 25,731; Referee: Lee Mason (Lancashire)

2 November 2008 11	Bolton Wanderers	2–0	Manchester City	Bolton, England
16:00 GMT (Away team kit & GK strip 1)	Gardner 77'; Dunne 88' (o.g.)	BBC Sport report Guardian report		Stadium: Reebok Stadium; Attendance: 21,095; Referee: Mike Riley (Yorkshire)

9 November 2008 12	Manchester City	1–2	Tottenham Hotspur	Manchester, England
15:00 GMT (Home v1 team kit & GK strip 2a)	Robinho 16'	BBC Sport report Guardian report Hungarian video	29', 64' Bent	Stadium: City of Manchester Stadium; Attendance: 41,893; Referee: Mike Dean (Wirral)

16 November 2008 13	Hull City	2–2	Manchester City	Kingston upon Hull, England
16:00 GMT (Home v1 team kit & GK strip 2b)	Cousin 14'; Geovanni 60'	BBC Sport report Guardian report	37', 45' Ireland	Stadium: KC Stadium; Attendance: 24,902; Referee: Phil Dowd (Staffordshire)

22 November 2008 14	Manchester City	3–0	Arsenal	Manchester, England
15:00 GMT (Home v1 team kit & GK strip 1)	Ireland 45+1'; Robinho 56'; Sturridge 90+1' (pen.)	BBC Sport report Guardian report		Stadium: City of Manchester Stadium; Attendance: 44,878; Referee: Alan Wiley (Staffordshire)

30 November 2008 15	Manchester City	0–1	Manchester United	Manchester, England
13:30 GMT (Home v1 team kit & GK strip 2a)		BBC Sport report Guardian report	42' Rooney	Stadium: City of Manchester Stadium; Attendance: 47,320; Referee: Howard Webb (South Yorkshire)

6 December 2008 16	Fulham	1–1	Manchester City	London, England
12:45 GMT (Away team kit & GK strip 1)	Bullard 27'	BBC Sport report Guardian report	6' Benjani	Stadium: Craven Cottage; Attendance: 24,012; Referee: Rob Styles (Hampshire)

13 December 2008 17	Manchester City	0–1	Everton	Manchester, England
15:00 GMT (Home v1 team kit & GK strip 2a)		BBC Sport report Guardian report	90+2' Cahill	Stadium: City of Manchester Stadium; Attendance: 41,344; Referee: Mark Halsey (Lancashire)

21 December 2008 18	West Bromwich Albion	2–1	Manchester City	West Bromwich, England
13:30 GMT (Third v1 team kit & GK strip 1)	Moore 69'; Bednář 90+2'	BBC Sport report Guardian report	86' Caicedo	Stadium: The Hawthorns; Attendance: 25,010; Referee: Chris Foy (Merseyside)

26 December 2008 19	Manchester City	5–1	Hull City	Manchester, England
15:00 GMT (Home v1 team kit & GK strip 2a)	Caicedo 15', 27'; Robinho 28', 36'; Ireland 82'	BBC Sport report Guardian report	80' Fagan	Stadium: City of Manchester Stadium; Attendance: 45,196; Referee: Andre Marriner (West Midlands)

28 December 2008 20	Blackburn Rovers	2–2	Manchester City	Blackburn, England
16:15 GMT (Away team kit & GK strip 1)	McCarthy 45'; Roberts 84'	BBC Sport report Guardian report	88' Sturridge; 90+4' Robinho	Stadium: Ewood Park; Attendance: 25,200; Referee: Howard Webb (South Yorkshire)

17 January 2009 21	Manchester City	1–0	Wigan Athletic	Manchester, England
15:00 GMT (Home v1 team kit & GK strip 2a)	Zabaleta 53'	BBC Sport report Guardian report		Stadium: City of Manchester Stadium; Attendance: 41,262; Referee: Lee Mason (Lancashire)

28 January 2009 22	Manchester City	2–1	Newcastle United	Manchester, England
19:45 GMT (Home v1 team kit & GK strip 2a)	Wright-Phillips 17'; Bellamy 77'	BBC Sport report Guardian report	81' Carroll	Stadium: City of Manchester Stadium; Attendance: 42,280; Referee: Mike Jones (Cheshire)

31 January 2009 23	Stoke City	1–0	Manchester City	Stoke-on-Trent, England
12:45 GMT (Home v3 team kit & GK strip 1)	Beattie 45+5'	BBC Sport report Guardian report		Stadium: Britannia Stadium; Attendance: 27,236; Referee: Martin Atkinson (West Yorkshire)

7 February 2009 24	Manchester City	1–0	Middlesbrough	Manchester, England
12:45 GMT (Home v1 team kit & GK strip 1)	Bellamy 51'	BBC Sport report Guardian report		Stadium: City of Manchester Stadium; Attendance: 40,558; Referee: Andre Marriner (West Midlands)

14 February 2009 25	Portsmouth	2–0	Manchester City	Portsmouth, England
15:00 GMT (Away team kit & GK strip 1)	Johnson 70'; Hreiðarsson 75'	Postponement report BBC Sport report Guardian report		Stadium: Fratton Park; Attendance: 20,018; Referee: Lee Probert (Wiltshire)

22 February 2009 26	Liverpool	1–1	Manchester City	Liverpool, England
15:00 GMT (Home v1 team kit & GK strip 1)	Kuyt 78'	BBC Sport report Guardian report	51' Bellamy	Stadium: Anfield; Attendance: 44,259; Referee: Phil Dowd (Staffordshire)

1 March 2009 27	West Ham United	1–0	Manchester City	London, England
12:30 GMT (Third v1 team kit & GK strip 2a)	Collison 70'	BBC Sport report Guardian report		Stadium: Boleyn Ground; Attendance: 34,562; Referee: Mike Dean (Wirral)

4 March 2009 28	Manchester City	2–0	Aston Villa	Manchester, England
19:45 GMT (Home v1 team kit & GK strip 1)	Elano 24' (pen.); Wright-Phillips 89'	BBC Sport report Guardian report		Stadium: City of Manchester Stadium; Attendance: 40,137; Referee: Chris Foy (Merseyside)

15 March 2009 29	Chelsea	1–0	Manchester City	London, England
13:30 GMT (Away team kit & GK strip 2a)	Essien 18'	BBC Sport report Guardian report		Stadium: Stamford Bridge; Attendance: 41,810; Referee: Mike Riley (Yorkshire)

22 March 2009 30	Manchester City	1–0	Sunderland	Manchester, England
15:00 GMT (Home v1 team kit & GK strip 1)	Richards 56'	BBC Sport report Guardian report		Stadium: City of Manchester Stadium; Attendance: 43,017; Referee: Steve Tanner (Somerset)

4 April 2009 31	Arsenal	2–0	Manchester City	London, England
15:00 BST (Home v2 team kit & GK strip 1)	Adebayor 8', 49'	BBC Sport report Guardian report		Stadium: Emirates Stadium; Attendance: 60,097; Referee: Andre Marriner (West Midlands)

12 April 2009 32	Manchester City	1–3	Fulham	Manchester, England
16:10 BST (Home v1 team kit & GK strip 1)	Ireland 28'	BBC Sport report Guardian report	50', 83' Dempsey; 59' Etuhu	Stadium: City of Manchester Stadium; Attendance: 39,841; Referee: Mark Halsey (Lancashire)

19 April 2009 33	Manchester City	4–2	West Bromwich Albion	Manchester, England
15:00 BST (Home v1 team kit & GK strip 2a)	Robinho 8'; Onuoha 21'; Elano 56' (pen.); Sturridge 90+1'	BBC Sport report Guardian report	37', 54' Brunt	Stadium: City of Manchester Stadium; Attendance: 40,072; Referee: Mike Jones (Cheshire)

25 April 2009 34	Everton	1–2	Manchester City	Liverpool, England
15:00 BST (Away team kit & GK strip 1)	Gosling 90+4'	BBC Sport report Guardian report	35' Robinho; 54' Ireland	Stadium: Goodison Park; Attendance: 37,791; Referee: Alan Wiley (Staffordshire)

2 May 2009 35	Manchester City	3–1	Blackburn Rovers	Manchester, England
15:00 BST (Home v1 team kit & GK strip 1)	Caicedo 27'; Robinho 34'; Elano 45+1' (pen.)	BBC Sport report Guardian report	66' Andrews	Stadium: City of Manchester Stadium; Attendance: 43,967; Referee: Mike Dean (Wirral)

10 May 2009 36	Manchester United	2–0	Manchester City	Manchester, England
13:30 BST (Home v2 team kit & GK strip 2a)	Ronaldo 18'; Tevez 45'	BBC Sport report Guardian report		Stadium: Old Trafford; Attendance: 75,464; Referee: Chris Foy (Merseyside)

16 May 2009 37	Tottenham Hotspur	2–1	Manchester City	London, England
15:00 BST (Home v1 team kit & GK strip 2a)	Defoe 29'; Keane 86' (pen.)	BBC Sport report Guardian report	65' Bojinov	Stadium: White Hart Lane; Attendance: 36,000; Referee: Mark Halsey (Lancashire)

24 May 2009 38	Manchester City	1–0	Bolton Wanderers	Manchester, England
16:00 BST (Home v1 team kit & GK strip 1)	Caicedo 8'	BBC Sport report Guardian report		Stadium: City of Manchester Stadium; Attendance: 47,202; Referee: Mark Clattenburg (Tyne & Wear)

=== UEFA Cup ===
==== Qualifying phase ====
===== First qualifying round =====
17 July 2008 First leg	EB Streymur (Faroe Islands)	0–2	(England) Manchester City	Tórshavn, Faroe Islands
19:00 BST (Home v1 team kit & GK strip 1)		BBC Sport report M.E.N. report YouTube video	9' Petrov; 28' Hamann	Stadium: Tórsvøllur; Attendance: 5,400; Referee: Nicole Petignat (Switzerland)

31 July 2008 Second leg	Manchester City (England)	2–0 (4–0 agg.)	(Faroe Islands) EB Streymur	Barnsley, England
20:00 BST (Home v1 team kit & GK strip 1)	Petrov 48'; Vassell 90'	BBC Sport report M.E.N. report YouTube video YouTube video		Stadium: Oakwell Stadium (Note: An alternative venue was required due to the time required for the City of Manchester Stadium pitch to recover from that summer's events.); Attendance: 7,334; Referee: Augustus Constantin (Romania)

===== Second qualifying round =====
14 August 2008 First leg	Manchester City (England)	0–1	(Denmark) Midtjylland	Manchester, England
19:45 BST (Home v1 team kit & GK strip 1)		BBC Sport report Guardian report YouTube video	15' Olsen	Stadium: City of Manchester Stadium; Attendance: 27,200; Referee: Babak Rafati (Germany)

28 August 2008 Second leg	Midtjylland (Denmark)	0–1 (a.e.t.) (1–1 agg.) (2–4 p)	(England) Manchester City	Herning, Denmark
16:25 BST (Home v1 team kit & GK strip 1)		BBC Sport report Guardian report	90' (o.g.) Califf	Stadium: MCH Arena; Attendance: 9,552; Referee: Robert Malek (Poland)
	Penalties
	Reid (penalty scored); Poulsen (penalty scored); Borring (penalty missed); Afriyie (penalty missed)		(penalty scored) Evans; (penalty scored) Petrov; (penalty missed) Johnson; (penalty scored) Hamann; (penalty scored) Ćorluka

==== First round ====
18 September 2008 First leg	Omonia (Cyprus)	1–2	(England) Manchester City	Nicosia, Cyprus
18:00 BST (Home v2 team kit & GK strip 1)	Duro 49'	BBC Sport report Guardian report YouTube video	59', 72' Jô	Stadium: Neo GSP Stadium; Attendance: 15,907; Referee: Paolo Dondarini (Italy)

2 October 2008 Second leg	Manchester City (England)	2–1 (4–2 agg.)	(Cyprus) Omonia	Manchester, England
19:45 BST (Home v2 team kit & GK strip 1)	Elano 48'; Wright-Phillips 55'	BBC Sport report Guardian report YouTube video	78' Alabi	Stadium: City of Manchester Stadium; Attendance: 25,304; Referee: Saïd Ennjimi (France)

==== Group phase ====
6 November 2008 1	Manchester City (England)	3–2	(Netherlands) Twente	Manchester, England
19:45 GMT (Home v1 team kit & GK strip 1)	Wright-Phillips 2'; Robinho 57'; Benjani 62'	BBC Sport report Guardian report YouTube video	17' Elia; 65' Wielaert	Stadium: City of Manchester Stadium; Attendance: 21,247; Referee: Nikolay Ivanov (Russia)

27 November 2008 2	Schalke 04 (Germany)	0–2	(England) Manchester City	Gelsenkirchen, Germany
18:00 GMT (Third v2 team kit & GK strip 1)		BBC Sport report Guardian report	32' Benjani; 66' Ireland	Stadium: Arena AufSchalke; Attendance: 54,142; Referee: Alexandru Tudor (Romania)

3 December 2008 3	Manchester City (England)	0–0	(France) Paris Saint-Germain	Manchester, England
19:45 GMT (Home v1 team kit & GK strip 1)		BBC Sport report Guardian report		Stadium: City of Manchester Stadium; Attendance: 25,626; Referee: Bruno Paixão (Portugal)

18 December 2008 4	Racing Santander (Spain)	3–1	(England) Manchester City	Santander, Spain
19:45 GMT (Home v1 team kit & GK strip 1)	Serrano 30'; Pereira 20'; Valera 54'	BBC Sport report Guardian report	90' Caicedo	Stadium: Estadio El Sardinero; Attendance: 18,360; Referee: Serge Gumienny (Belgium)

Group A standings	Pld	W	D	L	GF	GA	GD	Pts
(England) Manchester City	4	2	1	1	6	5	+1	7
(Netherlands) Twente	4	2	0	2	5	8	−3	6
(France) Paris Saint-Germain	4	1	2	1	7	5	+2	5
(Spain) Racing Santander	4	1	2	1	6	5	+1	5
(Germany) Schalke 04	4	1	1	2	5	6	−1	4

Group A results	MC	PSG	RdS	S04	FCT
Manchester City	–	0–0	–	–	3–2
Paris Saint-Germain	–	–	2–2	–	4–0
Racing Santander	3–1	–	–	1–1	–
Schalke 04	0–2	3–1	–	–	–
FC Twente	–	–	1–0	2–1	–

==== Final phase ====
===== Round of 32 =====
19 February 2009 First leg	Copenhagen (Denmark)	2–2	(England) Manchester City	Copenhagen, Denmark
19:05 GMT (Home v2 team kit & GK strip 1)	Almeida 56'; Vingaard 90+1'	BBC Sport report Guardian report	29' Onuoha; 61' Ireland	Stadium: Parken Stadium; Attendance: 30,159; Referee: Pavel Kralovec (Czech Republic)

26 February 2009 Second leg	Manchester City (England)	2–1 (4–3 agg.)	(Denmark) Copenhagen	Manchester, England
19:45 GMT (Home v1 team kit & GK strip 2a)	Bellamy 73', 80'	BBC Sport report Guardian report YouTube video	90+3' Vingaard	Stadium: City of Manchester Stadium; Attendance: 26,018; Referee: Selçuk Dereli (Turkey)

===== Round of 16 =====
12 March 2009 First leg	Manchester City (England)	2–0	(Denmark) Aalborg BK	Manchester, England
19:45 GMT (Home v1 team kit & GK strip 1)	Caicedo 8'; Wright-Phillips 30'	BBC Sport report Guardian report YouTube video YouTube video		Stadium: City of Manchester Stadium; Attendance: 24,502; Referee: Alain Hamer (Luxembourg)

19 March 2009 Second leg	Aalborg BK (Denmark)	2–0 (a.e.t.) (2–2 agg.) (3–4 p)	(England) Manchester City	Aalborg, Denmark
20:00 GMT (Home v2 team kit & GK strip 1)	Shelton 85'; Jakobsen 90' (pen.)	BBC Sport report Guardian report YouTube video YouTube video		Stadium: Energi Nord Arena; Attendance: 10,734; Referee: Stéphane Lannoy (France)
	Penalties
	Jakobsen (penalty scored); Johansson (penalty scored); Augustinussen (penalty missed); Nomvethe (penalty scored); Shelton (penalty missed)		(penalty scored) Evans; (penalty scored) Elano; (penalty scored) Wright-Phillips; (penalty scored) Dunne

===== Quarter-final =====
9 April 2009 First leg	Hamburger SV (Germany)	3–1	(England) Manchester City	Hamburg, Germany
19:45 BST (Home v1 team kit & GK strip 1)	Mathijsen 9'; Trochowski 64' (pen.); Guerrero 79'	BBC Sport report Guardian report YouTube video	1' Ireland	Stadium: Hamburg Arena; Attendance: 50,500; Referee: Olegário Benquerença (Portugal)

16 April 2009 Second leg	Manchester City (England)	2–1 (3–4 agg.)	(Germany) Hamburger SV	Manchester, England
19:45 BST (Home v1 team kit & GK strip 1)	Elano 17' (pen.); Caicedo 50'	BBC Sport report Guardian report MCFC video	12' Guerrero	Stadium: City of Manchester Stadium; Attendance: 47,009; Referee: Nicola Rizzoli (Italy)

=== League Cup ===
==== Second round ====
24 September 2008	Brighton and Hove Albion	2–2 (a.e.t.) (5–3 p)	Manchester City	Brighton, England
19:45 BST (Away team kit & GK strip 2a)	Murray 89'; Anyinsah 95'	BBC Sport report Guardian report	64' Fernandes; 108' Ireland	Stadium: Withdean Stadium; Attendance: 8,729; Referee: Andy D'Urso (Essex)
	Penalties
	Livermore (penalty scored); Elphick (penalty scored); Murray (penalty scored); Virgo (penalty scored); Richards (penalty scored)		(penalty scored) Evans; (penalty scored) Elano; (penalty scored) Kompany; (penalty missed) Ball

=== FA Cup ===
==== Third round ====
3 January 2009	Manchester City	0–3	Nottingham Forest	Manchester, England
15:00 GMT (Home v1 team kit & GK strip 1)		BBC Sport report Guardian report	38' Tyson; 42' Earnshaw; 75' Garner	Stadium: City of Manchester Stadium; Attendance: 31,869; Referee: Lee Probert (Wiltshire)

== Playing statistics ==
=== Starting XI ===
No.	Pos.	Nat.	Name	MS	Notes
1	GK	(England)	Joe Hart	33	
5	RB	(Argentina)	Pablo Zabaleta	42	
2	CB	(England)	Micah Richards	50	
22	CB	(Republic of Ireland)	Richard Dunne	47	
25	LB	(England)	Wayne Bridge	22	
8	RM	(England)	Shaun Wright-Phillips	37	
7	CM	(Republic of Ireland)	Stephen Ireland	50	
33	CM	(Belgium)	Vincent Kompany	45	
11	LM	(Brazil)	Elano	42	
10	CF	(Brazil)	Robinho	41	
28	CF	(England)	Daniel Sturridge	26	

Source: Squad stats and Start formations.
Only competitive matches.
Using the most used start formation.
Ordered by position on pitch (from back right to front left).

Last updated: 21 August 2011
Source: Appearance and Starting Formations.
Only competitive matches.
Using the most used Starting Formation.
Sorted by position on pitch (from back right to front left).

Appearances (Apps.) numbers are for appearances in competitive games only
Apps. numbers denote: "Total no. of games played (No. of games played as a substitute)"
Red card numbers denote: "No. of second yellow cards / No. of straight red cards"
Yellow and red cards for the 2 domestic cups only accounted for in the TOTALS columns
*** indicates 3-match ban for violent conduct towards Rory Delap in PL game against Stoke City at the Britannia Stadium on 31 January 2009

No.	Pos.	Player	Premier League				UEFA Cup				FA Cup	League Cup		TOTALS All Competitions			
No.	Pos.	Player	Apps.		Yellow card	Red card	Apps.		Yellow card	Red card	Apps.	Apps.		Apps.		Yellow card	Red card
1	GK	(England) Joe Hart	23(0)				9(0)				1(0)			33(0)			
2	DF	(England) Micah Richards	34(1)	1	2		15(0)		3		1(0)			50(1)	1	5	
3	DF	(England) Michael Ball	8(0)				4(1)				1(0)	1(0)		14(1)			
4	DF	(England) Nedum Onuoha	23(3)	1	1		7(0)	1						30(3)	2	1	
Sold	DF	(Croatia) Vedran Ćorluka	3(0)	1			3(0)		1					6(0)	1	1	
5	DF	(Argentina) Pablo Zabaleta	29(3)	1	3	-/1	11(0)		2		1(0)	1(0)		42(3)	1	5	-/1
6	MF	(England) Michael Johnson	3(0)				4(0)		1			1(0)		8(0)		1	
7	MF	(Republic of Ireland) Stephen Ireland	35(1)	9	8		14(1)	3	1			1(0)	1	50(2)	13	9	
8	MF	(England) Shaun Wright-Phillips	27(0)	5	3		9(0)	3	1		1(0)			37(0)	8	4	***
9	FW	(Bulgaria) Valeri Bojinov	8(6)	1	1		1(1)							9(7)	1	1	
10	FW	(Brazil) Robinho	31(1)	14	3		10(0)	1	1					41(1)	15	4	
11	MF	(Brazil) Elano	28(7)	6	3		12(3)	2	3		1(0)	1(1)		42 (11)	8	6	
12	FW	(England) Darius Vassell	8(2)		1		6(0)	1			1(1)			15(3)	1	1	
14	FW	(Brazil) Jô	9(3)	1			7(1)	2			1(1)	1(0)		18(5)	3		
15	DF	(Spain) Javier Garrido	13(2)	1	1		8(2)		1					21(4)	1	2	
16	GK	(Denmark) Kasper Schmeichel	1(1)				1(0)					1(0)		3(1)			
17	MF	(Bulgaria) Martin Petrov	9(5)				5(1)	2						14(6)	2		
19	MF	(Switzerland) Gelson Fernandes	17 (14)	1	3	1/-	8(4)		1		1(0)	1(0)	1	27 (18)	2	4	1/-
20	FW	(Ecuador) Felipe Caicedo	17(7)	5	2		6(3)	3			1(0)	1(1)		25 (11)	8	2	
21	MF	(Germany) Dietmar Hamann	9(4)				8(5)	1	1		1(1)			18 (10)	1	1	
22	DF	(Republic of Ireland) Richard Dunne (c)	31(0)	1	4	-/2	14(0)		1	1/-	1(0)	1(0)		47(0)	1	6	1/2
24	FW	(Wales) Ched Evans	16 (13)	1	1		8(6)					1(1)		25 (20)	1	1	
25	DF	(England) Wayne Bridge	16(0)				6(0)							22(0)			
26	DF	(Israel) Tal Ben Haim	9(1)		2		5(0)		3			1(0)		15(1)		5	
27	FW	(Zimbabwe) Benjani	8(1)	1			4(3)	2						12(4)	3		
28	FW	(England) Daniel Sturridge	16(13)	4			8(3)				1(0)	1(0)		26 (16)	4		
29	MF	(Nigeria) Kelvin Etuhu	4(2)				3(3)							7(5)			
30	DF	(England) Shaleum Logan	1(0)											1(0)			
33	MF	(Belgium) Vincent Kompany	34(0)	1	8		9(1)		3		1(0)	1(0)		45(1)	1	11	
34	MF	(Netherlands) Nigel de Jong	16(0)		3									16(0)		3	
36	DF	(Brazil) Gláuber	1(1)											1(1)			
37	GK	(Republic of Ireland) Shay Given	15(0)				6(0)		1					21(0)		1	
39	FW	(Wales) Craig Bellamy	8(1)	3	1		3(0)	2	2					11(1)	5	3	
40	MF	(Slovakia) Vladimír Weiss	1(1)											1(1)			
TOTALS				58	50	1/3		23	26	1/-			2		83	77	2/3
TOTALS					Yellow card	Red card			Yellow card	Red card						Yellow card	Red card

Information current as of 24 May 2009 (end of season)

Last updated: 28 January 2011.
Source: (for players and positions) Season 2008–09 First Team Squad (for squad numbers) Season 2008–09 Squad Numbers (for actual stats.) All match Reports in Competitive games section above

== Goal scorers ==
=== All competitions ===
Scorer	Goals
(Brazil) Robinho	15
(Republic of Ireland) Stephen Ireland	13
(Ecuador) Felipe Caicedo	8
(Brazil) Elano	8
(England) Shaun Wright-Phillips	8
(Wales) Craig Bellamy	5
(England) Daniel Sturridge	4
(Zimbabwe) Benjani	3
(Brazil) Jô	3
(Switzerland) Gélson Fernandes	2
(England) Nedum Onuoha	2
(Bulgaria) Martin Petrov	2
(Bulgaria) Valeri Bojinov	1
(Croatia) Vedran Ćorluka	1
(Republic of Ireland) Richard Dunne	1
(Wales) Ched Evans	1
(Spain) Javier Garrido	1
(Germany) Dietmar Hamann	1
(Belgium) Vincent Kompany	1
(England) Micah Richards	1
(England) Darius Vassell	1
(Argentina) Pablo Zabaleta	1

=== Premier League ===
Scorer	Goals
(Brazil) Robinho	14
(Republic of Ireland) Stephen Ireland	9
(Brazil) Elano	6
(Ecuador) Felipe Caicedo	5
(England) Shaun Wright-Phillips	5
(England) Daniel Sturridge	4
(Wales) Craig Bellamy	3
(Zimbabwe) Benjani	1
(Bulgaria) Valeri Bojinov	1
(Croatia) Vedran Ćorluka	1
(Republic of Ireland) Richard Dunne	1
(Wales) Ched Evans	1
(Switzerland) Gélson Fernandes	1
(Spain) Javier Garrido	1
(Brazil) Jô	1
(Belgium) Vincent Kompany	1
(England) Nedum Onuoha	1
(England) Micah Richards	1
(Argentina) Pablo Zabaleta	1

=== UEFA Cup ===
Scorer	Goals
(Ecuador) Felipe Caicedo	3
(Republic of Ireland) Stephen Ireland	3
(England) Shaun Wright-Phillips	3
(Wales) Craig Bellamy	2
(Zimbabwe) Benjani	2
(Brazil) Elano	2
(Brazil) Jô	2
(Bulgaria) Martin Petrov	2
(Germany) Dietmar Hamann	1
(England) Nedum Onuoha	1
(Brazil) Robinho	1
(England) Darius Vassell	1

=== League Cup and FA Cup ===
Scorer	Goals
(Switzerland) Gélson Fernandes	1
(Republic of Ireland) Stephen Ireland	1

Information current as of 24 May 2009 (end of season)

== Awards ==
=== Thomas Cook Player of the Month awards ===
Awarded to the player in each category that receives the most votes in a poll conducted each month on the MCFC OWS

Month	First Team	Reserve Team	Academy
August	(Republic of Ireland) Stephen Ireland	(England) Adam Clayton	(England) Andrew Tutte
September	(England) Shaun Wright-Phillips	(England) Clayton McDonald	(Liberia) Alex Tchuimeni-Nimely
October	(Brazil) Robinho	(England) Clayton McDonald	(Belgium) Dedryck Boyata
November	(Republic of Ireland) Stephen Ireland	(Republic of Ireland) Donal McDermott	(England) Andrew Tutte
December	(Belgium) Vincent Kompany	(England) Paul Marshall	not announced
January	(Argentina) Pablo Zabaleta	(Northern Ireland) Ryan McGivern	not announced
February	(Wales) Craig Bellamy	(England) David Ball	not announced
March	(England) Nedum Onuoha	(England) Ben Mee	(Belgium) Dedryck Boyata
April	(Brazil) Elano	(Slovakia) Vladimír Weiss	(Republic of Ireland) Greg Cunningham
May	(England) Nedum Onuoha	(Slovakia) Vladimír Weiss	(England) Kieran Trippier

=== Official Supporters Club awards ===
Player	Season 2008–09 awards
(Republic of Ireland) Stephen Ireland	Player of the Year
(England) Daniel Sturridge	Young Player of the Year

== Transfers and loans ==
=== Transfers in ===
==== First team ====
Date	Pos.	Player	From club	Transfer fee
2 July 2008	FW	(Brazil) Jô	(Russia) CSKA Moscow	£18M
30 July 2008	DF	(Israel) Tal Ben Haim	(England) Chelsea	£5M
21 August 2008	DF	(Belgium) Vincent Kompany	(Germany) Hamburger SV	£6M
28 August 2008	MF	(England) Shaun Wright-Phillips	(England) Chelsea	£8.5M
31 August 2008	DF	(Argentina) Pablo Zabaleta	(Spain) Espanyol	£6.45M
31 August 2008	DF	(Brazil) Gláuber	(Germany) 1. FC Nürnberg	Undisc.
1 September 2008	FW	(Brazil) Robinho	(Spain) Real Madrid	£32.5M
3 January 2009	DF	(England) Wayne Bridge	(England) Chelsea	£10M
19 January 2009	FW	(Wales) Craig Bellamy	(England) West Ham United	£14M
21 January 2009	MF	(Netherlands) Nigel de Jong	(Germany) Hamburger SV	£16M
1 February 2009	GK	(Republic of Ireland) Shay Given	(England) Newcastle United	£5.9M

==== Reserves & Academy ====
Date	Pos.	Player	From club	Transfer fee
Sep. 2008	FW	(Italy) Marcello Trotta	(Italy) Napoli	£750,000 [x]
12 October 2008	DF	(England) Oliver Nicholas	(England) Arsenal	Free
20 October 2008	MF	(Spain) Alex Pla	(Spain) UD Cornellà	Undisc.
20 October 2008	MF	(Spain) Jorge Guinovart	(Spain) UD Cornellà	Undisc.
17 February 2009	DF	(France) Jérémy Hélan	(France) Rennes	Undisc.
25 February 2009	GK	(Faroe Islands) Gunnar Nielsen	(England) Blackburn Rovers	Free

[x] =

=== Transfers out ===
==== First team ====
Exit Date	Pos.	Player	To club	Transfer fee
2 July 2008	GK	(Sweden) Andreas Isaksson	(Netherlands) PSV	Undisc.
2 July 2008	DF	(China) Sun Jihai	(England) Sheffield United	Free
4 July 2008	MF	(Brazil) Geovanni	(England) Hull City	Free
14 July 2008	FW	(Greece) Georgios Samaras	(Scotland) Celtic	Undisc.
30 July 2008	FW	(Italy) Bernardo Corradi	(Italy) Reggina	Free
7 August 2008	FW	(Scotland) Paul Dickov	(England) Leicester City	Free
23 August 2008	FW	(Italy) Rolando Bianchi	(Italy) Torino	Undisc.
1 September 2008	DF	(Croatia) Vedran Ćorluka	(England) Tottenham Hotspur	£8.5M
2 September 2008	FW	(Belgium) Émile Mpenza	(England) Plymouth Argyle	Released

==== Reserves & Academy ====
Exit Date	Pos.	Player	To club	Transfer fee
1 July 2008	DF	(Republic of Ireland) Garry Breen	(England) Hereford United	Free
1 July 2008	DF	(Republic of Ireland) Michael Daly	Released	
1 July 2008	GK	(Italy) Andrea Giombetti	Released	
1 July 2008	MF	(England) Ashley Grimes	(England) Millwall	Free
1 July 2008	FW	(Faroe Islands) Christian Mouritsen	Released	
30 July 2008	DF	(England) Matthew Mills	(England) Doncaster Rovers	£300,000
16 October 2008	FW	(Thailand) Teerasil Dangda	Released	
16 October 2008	DF	(Thailand) Kiatprawut Saiwaeo	Released	
16 October 2008	DF	(Thailand) Suree Sukha	Released	
2 January 2009	DF	(England) Sam Williamson	(England) Wrexham	Free

=== Loans in ===
==== First team ====
Start date	End date	Pos.	Player	From club

==== Reserves & Academy ====
Start date	End date	Pos.	Player	From club

=== Loans out ===
==== First team ====
Start date	End date	Pos.	Player	To club
1 February 2009	31 May 2009	DF	(Israel) Tal Ben Haim	(England) Sunderland
2 February 2009	31 May 2009	FW	(Brazil) Jô	(England) Everton

==== Reserves & Academy ====
Start date	End date	Pos.	Player	To club
15 August 2008	14 September 2008	DF	(England) Clayton McDonald	(England) Macclesfield Town
29 August 2008	3 January 2009	MF	(Republic of Ireland) Karl Moore	(England) Millwall
1 September 2008	1 October 2008	DF	(England) Javan Vidal	(England) Grimsby Town
11 September 2008	10 October 2008	MF	(Republic of Ireland) Donal McDermott	(England) Milton Keynes Dons
23 October 2008	31 December 2008	DF	(Northern Ireland) Ryan McGivern	(England) Morecambe
31 October 2008	31 December 2008	MF	(Cyprus) Angelos Tsiaklis	(England) Wrexham
27 September 2008	2 January 2009	DF	(England) Sam Williamson	(England) Wrexham
16 January 2009	31 May. 2009	DF	(England) Javan Vidal	(Scotland) Aberdeen
29 January 2009	28 February 2009	MF	(England) Paul Marshall	(England) Blackpool
3 February 2009	23 March 2009	MF	(England) Clayton McDonald	(England) Chesterfield
6 March 2009	31 May 2009	MF	(England) Paul Marshall	(England) Port Vale
26 March 2009	31 May 2009	GK	(Faroe Islands) Gunnar Nielsen	(England) Wrexham
17 April 2009	31 May 2009	GK	(England) Richard Martin	(England) Burton Albion
