= Abu Dhabi United Group =

Private equity company

Abu Dhabi United Group for Development and Investment
- Trade name: Abu Dhabi United Group (ADUG)
- Native name: مجموعة أبوظبي المتحدة للتنمية والاستثمار
- Industry: Sports; Sports services
- Founded: 2008
- Founder: Mansour bin Zayed Al Nahyan
- Headquarters: Abu Dhabi, United Arab Emirates
- Key people: Khaldoon Al Mubarak
- Owner: Mansour bin Zayed Al Nahyan
- Subsidiaries: City Football Group (81%)

The Abu Dhabi United Group for Development and Investment (ADUG; Arabic: مجموعة أبوظبي الاتحاد للتنمية والاستثمار) is a United Arab Emirates (UAE) based private equity company. It is owned by Sheikh Mansour bin Zayed Al Nahyan, member of the Abu Dhabi Royal Family and Vice President of the UAE. Leaks of internal documents show that the Abu Dhabi government manages the accounts belonging to ADUG. ADUG insists it is separate from the Abu Dhabi government.

The primary interest of the group is its 81% majority ownership of City Football Group, a worldwide organisation most notably controlling Manchester City, Mumbai City, Melbourne City and New York City, as well as several other international football clubs. However, it also holds interests in various other endeavours outside of the sporting world with an extensive property portfolio in the United Arab Emirates and Manchester.

== City Football Group ==
The Group was founded in the summer of 2008, as Sheikh Mansour looked to take over Manchester City Football Club from the former Prime Minister of Thailand Thaksin Shinawatra and signed off the deal on 1 September 2008, with due diligence completed on 23 September the same year.

Sulaiman Al-Fahim was the public face of ADUG during the initial phase of the takeover - a larger-than-life figure often described as the "Donald Trump of Abu Dhabi". On completion of the takeover, Al-Fahim generated considerable attention in the footballing world with promises of grandiose spending plans to capture the world's greatest footballing talents. Although he did bring in the Brazilian Robinho from Real Madrid on the same day on which the takeover was agreed, one week after ADUG took control of the club Al-Fahim was removed from his role to be replaced by Khaldoon al-Mubarak, who remains in position to the present day.

In 2011, Manchester City qualified for the Champions League and won the FA Cup, providing the club their first success in over three decades following ADUG's support. In 2012, the club won the Premier League, their first league title in forty-four years.

Following the success of the Manchester club, ADUG began investment into other football clubs. After founding the MLS side New York City and purchasing the A-League franchise Melbourne Heart (shortly afterwards renamed Melbourne City), it was deemed necessary to create a new infrastructure to manage the various worldwide footballing ventures, and to keep them separate from non-footballing business. For this purpose, City Football Group was created in 2014 to oversee all of the teams under their control, acting as holding company not only to the football teams but to several businesses designed to market football services to the wider market. In return, ADUG became the holding company for CFG.

ADUG have diluted their shareholding the City Football Group on two occasions in 2015 and 2019 to the approximate value of £654 million. As of 2020, they own 78% of the City Football Group. Since July 2021, CFG has been managed under Newton Investment and Development LLC, another company wholly owned by Sheikh Mansour.

== Other business interests ==
ADUG also have an extensive property portfolio in the United Arab Emirates and abroad. Aside from Manchester City, ADUG have amassed investments totalling nearly £1 billion in Manchester, mainly in property and higher education sectors. Aside from purchasing assets for their own control, ADUG signed a ten-year partnership with Manchester City Council to revamp the east end of the city - not coincidentally the same area in which Manchester City are based - creating the Manchester Life Development Company in conjunction with the council in order to build 6,000 affordable houses in the area.

== Criticism ==
According to Human Rights Watch, ADUG's investment in Manchester City enabled Abu Dhabi to "construct a public relations image of a progressive, dynamic Gulf state, which deflects attention from what is really going on in the country".

Manchester City was accused of receiving £30 million from an unknown figure from the United Arab Emirates, that was supposed to come from the sponsor. The £30 million payments are expected to be one of the 115 Premier League's financial charges against Manchester City. The report also claimed that the payments were actually disguised equity funding that came from the Abu Dhabi United Group (ADUG), owned by Sheikh Mansour bin Zayed Al Nahyan, the vice president of the UAE. According to the report, during UEFA disciplinary hearing, the Manchester City’s lawyer named the unknown person as Jaber Mohamed, claiming that he is a businessman providing financial and brokering services in the UAE. In 2025, The Athletic reported that Jaber was one of the two senior most aides of Mohamed bin Zayed. At the time of sponsorship payments, Jaber Mohamed was serving as the General of the Abu Dhabi Crown Prince's Court, which is responsible for supporting MbZ. Meanwhile, another of Sheikh Mohamed’s key aide and CPC’s undersecretary, Mohamed Al Mazrouei was also on Manchester City’s board between 2010-2022. Experts expressed concerns about how deeply MbZ was involved and how much he knew about Man City’s sponsorship deals.

On 29 September 2026, the Premier League announced that an independent commission had found Manchester City guilty of serious breaches of the league’s financial rules relating to the 2009–10 to 2017–18 seasons. The commission found that a number of commercial agreements had misrepresented the club’s revenues and costs. According to the findings, several sponsors paid only part of the sums recorded under their sponsorship agreements, with the balance being provided by Manchester City’s then-owner, Abu Dhabi United Group Investment & Development Ltd (ADUG). The commission also found that other arrangements funded by ADUG enabled the club to record lower operating costs.

The commission concluded that the arrangements increased Manchester City’s reported revenue and reduced its reported costs by more than £900 million over the period, and that the club would otherwise have exceeded Premier League and UEFA spending limits by a substantial amount. Manchester City rejected the commission’s findings, maintained that it was innocent of the allegations and announced that it would appeal, alleging errors of law, principle and fact in the decision. No sanction had been imposed at the time the findings were announced.

== See also ==
- Manchester City F.C. ownership and finances
- City Football Group
