= Peter Swales =

British football club chairman (1932–1996)

- Born: 25 December 1932; Manchester, Lancashire, England
- Died: 2 May 1996 (aged 63); Manchester, England
- Occupations: Football chairman, businessman

Peter Swales (25 December 1932 – 2 May 1996) was a businessman who served as the chairman of Manchester City F.C. from 1973 until 1993. He held a variety of prominent positions within the game of football, including chairman of The Football Association's International Committee and vice-president of the F.A.

Swales became Manchester City chairman in 1973, with the club in a reasonably strong position and regularly challenging at the top of the Football League with clubs such as Liverpool, Leeds United and Derby County. Swales presided over a general decline in City's fortunes, which was exacerbated by numerous controversial decisions. After two decades, frustration grew, and Swales was ousted by Francis Lee after a long protest by City supporters, famously known as "Forward with Franny".

== Manchester City ==
As a boy Swales attended William Hulme's Grammar School.

Swales made his fortune in the radio and hi fi business and had also invested in Altrincham F.C., a club which was recognised as one of the best run non-Football League clubs in English football. In 1973, he became chairman of Manchester City, taking over from long-time chairman, Albert Alexander. He inherited City in a reasonably strong position, however there were signs that City's late 1960s dominance in English football was beginning to wane with no trophy since the victorious 1970 UEFA Cup Winners' Cup campaign.

He was blamed for the club's failure to keep pace with neighbours Manchester United after City's late 1960s/early 1970s heyday and various acts of mismanagement such as allowing Malcolm Allison's eccentric dismantling of the side in 1979. Swales was also a prominent figure in The Football Association and some fans believed he stayed on to preserve that status rather than further the fortunes of the club. Swales was known as a ruthless chairman, even by modern football standards, sacking eleven managers in his twenty-year reign at City.

The last interview recorded with him was performed by author Gary James and appeared in the fanzine Bert Trautmann's Helmet. It was quoted extensively in a profile of him in James Manchester: The Greatest City. Swales died just three years after leaving City, on 2 May 1996 aged 63, after suffering a heart attack. He was survived by his wife and three daughters. Swales was, in the words of Guardian journalist, David Conn: "a broken man shattered by his ousting." A minute's silence was impeccably observed prior to the Manchester City and Liverpool match at Maine Road on 5 May 1996. He maintained his affection for the club after leaving saying that "the last thing I want to see is for City to go down." The club were relegated less than a week after his death.

Despite City supporters misgivings over Swales and enthusiasm for the new chairman Francis Lee, the club actually went backwards under Lee. Manchester City reached the nadir of their 132 years' existence in 1998 when they were relegated to the third tier of the Football League for the first time in their history.

== See also ==
- Manchester City F.C. ownership and finances
