= Manchester City F.C. supporters =

Football fans

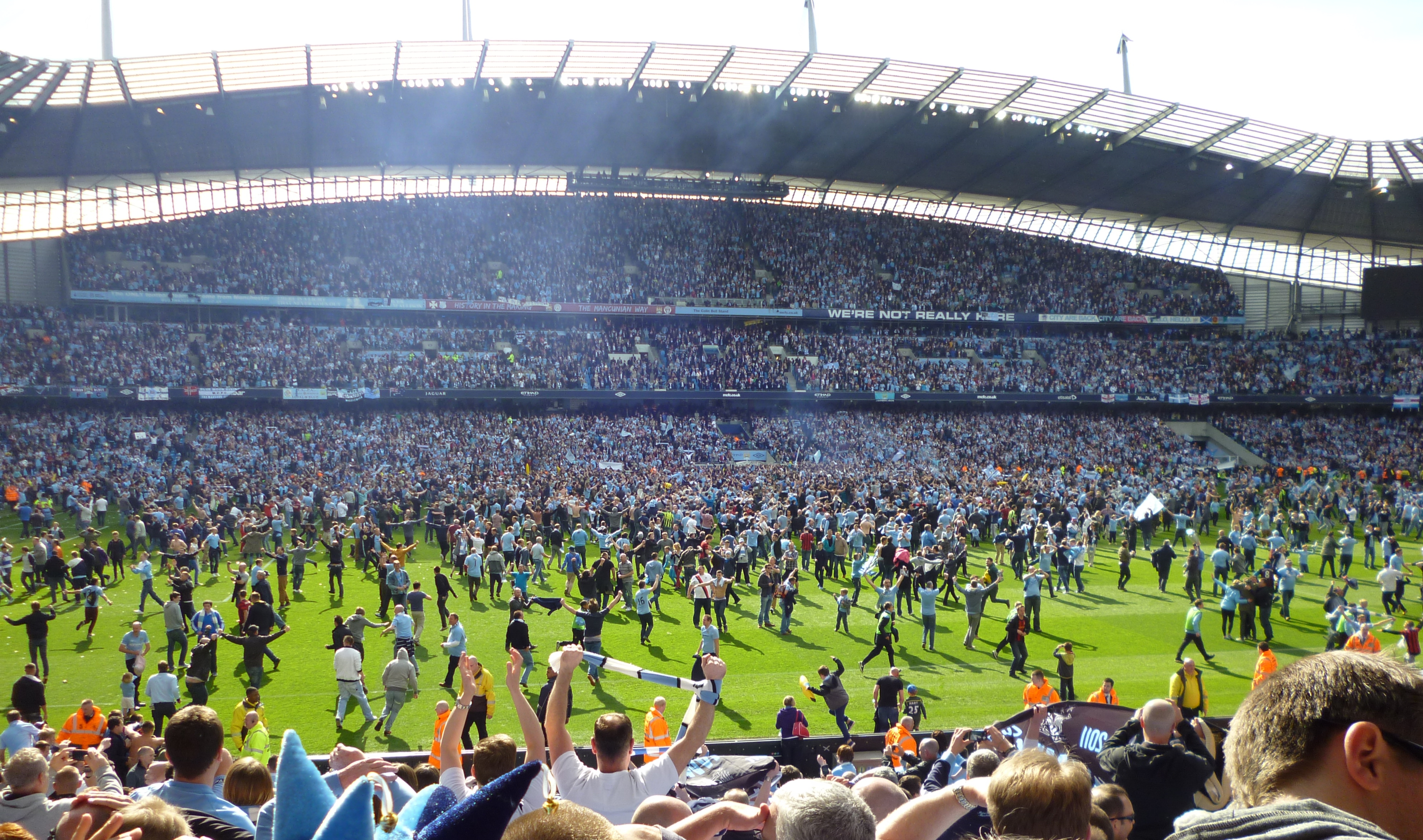
Manchester City supporters invade the pitch following their 2011–12 Premier League title win.

Since their inception in 1880 by Rev. Arthur Connell and William Beastow as St. Mark's (West Gorton), Manchester City Football Club have developed a following. Evolving from a cricket team which aimed to unite the community in industrial east Manchester, St. Mark's changed to Ardwick F.C. before settling on Manchester City F.C. on 16 April 1894.

City supporters have been described as being able to "revel in adversity" – evidenced in average match attendances increasing as the club fell to the second, and then third tier of English football for the only time in the club's history in 1998. Since moving to the City of Manchester Stadium in 2003, the club have sold approximately of 46,000 season tickets in every season they have played and average attendances have ranked in the top five of English football since.

Manchester City supporters are distinguishable by their sky blue, a colour which is only used by a handful of professional football clubs in England. The City supporters' song of choice is a rendition "Blue Moon" and are famous for their inflatables, normally yellow bananas, which are still occasionally seen today at various games, often when City are on a cup run. The inflatables were initially started as a humorous laugh by numerous City fans after a City player Imre Varadi was nicknamed banana hence the inflatable bananas. Other inflatables soon followed aimed at putting goodwill back into football during the dark days of English football hooliganism and stadium riots and the craze soon caught on with other clubs following suit and even dressing up the inflatable bananas. The Manchester City fans also till this day perform the Poznan when winning by a comfortable margin in order to taunt opposition.

The club have been previously branded as "everyone's second favourite club" due to their reputation as being one of the most tumultuous and unpredictable teams in English football with an innate ability 'to do things the hard way'. Supporters refer to inconsistent results and unexpected events as "Typical City", or "City-itis" and media often refer to City as a "soap opera" club. Historical events and results labelled as "Typical City" include being the only team to score and concede 100 league goals in one season (1957–58) and the only reigning champions in English football to be relegated (1937–38). However, despite anguish, many City fans regard success and failure as part of being a loyal and real football supporter and specifically what it means to be a Manchester City supporter.

Manchester City hold the second highest attendance record in English football (84,569), beaten only by Tottenham Hotspur on 14 September 2016 as Spurs were temporarily playing UEFA Champions League "home" games at Wembley Stadium. However, Manchester City still hold the record for the highest attended all-English football match, as 84,569 fans packed Maine Road for a sixth round FA Cup tie against Stoke City in 1934 (City went on to win the FA Cup that season). The ground was packed two and a half hours before kick-off, as supporters sat down on the touchline only yards from goalkeeper Frank Swift and the magnitude of the crowd caused a crush barrier to collapse causing a few injuries. Since then, the club has moved to the Eastlands (also known as the Etihad Stadium) near to where the club was formed in 1880. It has gradually gained a reputation as a modern atmospheric stadium despite fans initial reservations about moving from the famous Maine Road which, although atmospheric, was considered to be in a dilapidated state.

== Demographics ==
In a 2007 Premier League survey, Manchester City fans had the second greatest proportion of long-serving supporters after Everton with 55% of those Manchester City fans questioned having attended games at City for 25 years or more (versus Everton's 57%), both above the Premier League average of 44%. Despite the club's wealth, Manchester City have very strong working class roots which still remains today.

A 2002 report by a researcher at Manchester Metropolitan University found that while it was true that a higher proportion of City season ticket holders came from Manchester postcode areas (40% compared to United's 29%), there were more United season ticket holders, the lower percentage being due to United's higher overall number of season ticket holders (27,667 compared to City's 16,481). However, the report warned that since the compiling of data in 2001, the number of both City and United season ticket holders had risen hugely; expansion of United's ground and City's move to the City of Manchester (Etihad) Stadium have caused season ticket sales to increase further. The 2002 report has lost most of its validity as both clubs season tickets sales have fluctuated further as of 2010, with United selling 52,000 season tickets and City selling out all of its allocated 36,000 season tickets.

A 2012 survey by local newspaper the Manchester Evening News aimed to establish the spread of Manchester City and Manchester United in Greater Manchester, which consists of ten metropolitan boroughs with a combined population of 2.6 million. The survey found that Bolton, Bury, Rochdale, Salford and Trafford had a majority of United fans while Stockport, Tameside, Oldham and Wigan were found to have a small majority of City fans. The survey demonstrated that there is a general east-south support for Manchester City and north-west support for Manchester United which correlates with the location of both clubs respective stadiums.

== Manchester City supporter traits ==
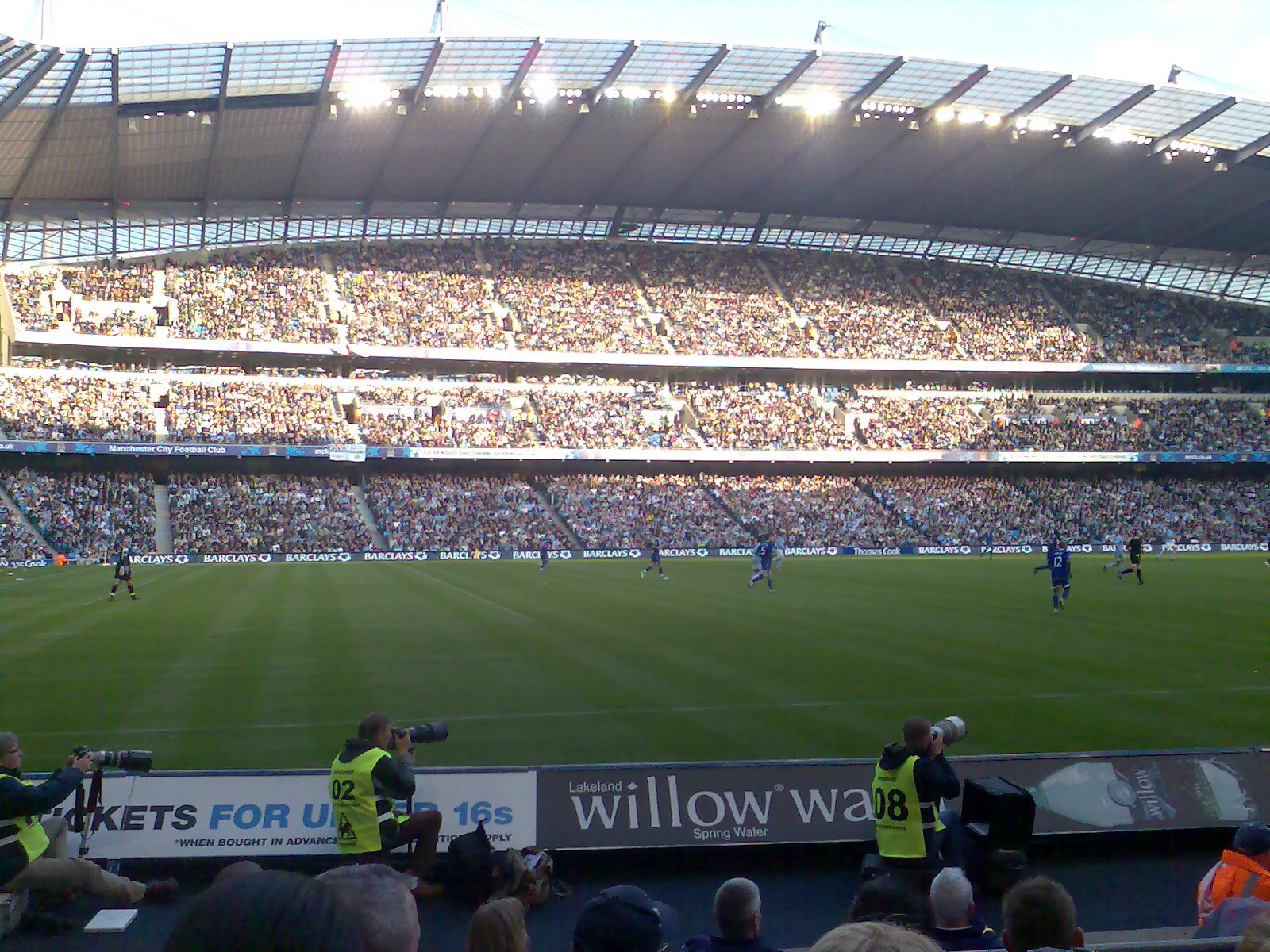
Manchester City fans watch Manchester City play Birmingham City at Eastlands.

Manchester City had a large fanbase even before its success in recent years. Since moving to the City of Manchester Stadium, Manchester City's average attendances have been in the top six in England, usually in excess of 40,000. Even in the late 1990s, when the club were relegated twice in three seasons and playing in the third tier of English football (then Division Two, now Football League One), home attendances were in the region of 30,000, compared to an average for the division of fewer than 8,000. Research carried out by Manchester City in 2005 estimates a fanbase of 886,000 in the United Kingdom and a total in excess of 4 million worldwide.

In the 2014–2015 season, Manchester City had the fourth highest average attendance in English football and the third highest in the Premier League, with only Manchester United, Arsenal and Newcastle United drawing greater crowds.

=== Inflatables craze ===
Manchester City fans have also been characterised by their yellow inflatable bananas since the late 1980s and are often seen at Manchester City cup games; for a while, the fans of many other English clubs began to parade inflatable bananas in the crowd at matches. In 1988, when City played against West Bromwich Albion, during which City fans called for the introduction of City striker "Imre Banana", or Imre Varadi as his real name was. Varadi said after his career, "I remember running out at Manchester City and someone threw a banana and just called me 'Imre Banana!', it didn't even rhyme with my name. The inflatable craze just swept the country and there was a banana craze." Indeed, Varadi was affectionately known as 'Banana' from then on and in the 1988–89 season inflatables soon become commonplace at many English football matches. In 1989, Manchester City travelled to play Hull City with City fans bringing hundreds of inflatable bananas amongst a veritable assortment of inflatables such as a six-foot crocodile, a toucan and a spitfire.

Although the bananas were present at Maine Road matches, the bigger inflatable displays were generally reserved for away matches, most notably against West Brom at the Hawthorns. This was an evening match which City lost 1–0. The drab match itself has largely been forgotten apart from Brian Gayle's original excuse for the mistake which cost the goal: "I was blinded by the floodlights". The sheer array of inflatables staggered many, four City fans appeared carrying an inflatable paddling pool, and sharks, penguins, crocodiles were present and there was even an epic battle of the monsters. At one end of the terrace stood Godzilla. Six feet tall, green and mean, this dinosaur was a match for anybody. At the other end of the terrace stood Frankenstein's Monster. Slowly they began to converge towards the centre of the terrace. The crowd roared in anticipation. Eventually they met and the creatures joined in battle. The craze soon died down, and in the 1990s the inflatable displays on a large scale were nowhere to be seen.

Currently, inflatable bananas have made sporadic appearances of at the City of Manchester Stadium (Etihad Stadium) in recent years. Bananas are occasionally on show during latter stages of cup runs, such as the 2008–09 UEFA Cup quarter-finals when Manchester City played Hamburg, the 2015–16 League Cup semi-finals against Everton, and the 2023 UEFA Champions League final against Inter Milan. After the club was found guilty of 114 charges of financial rules breaches, supporters brought inflatable bananas to Anfield during a Premier League match against Liverpool.

=== 'The Poznan' ===
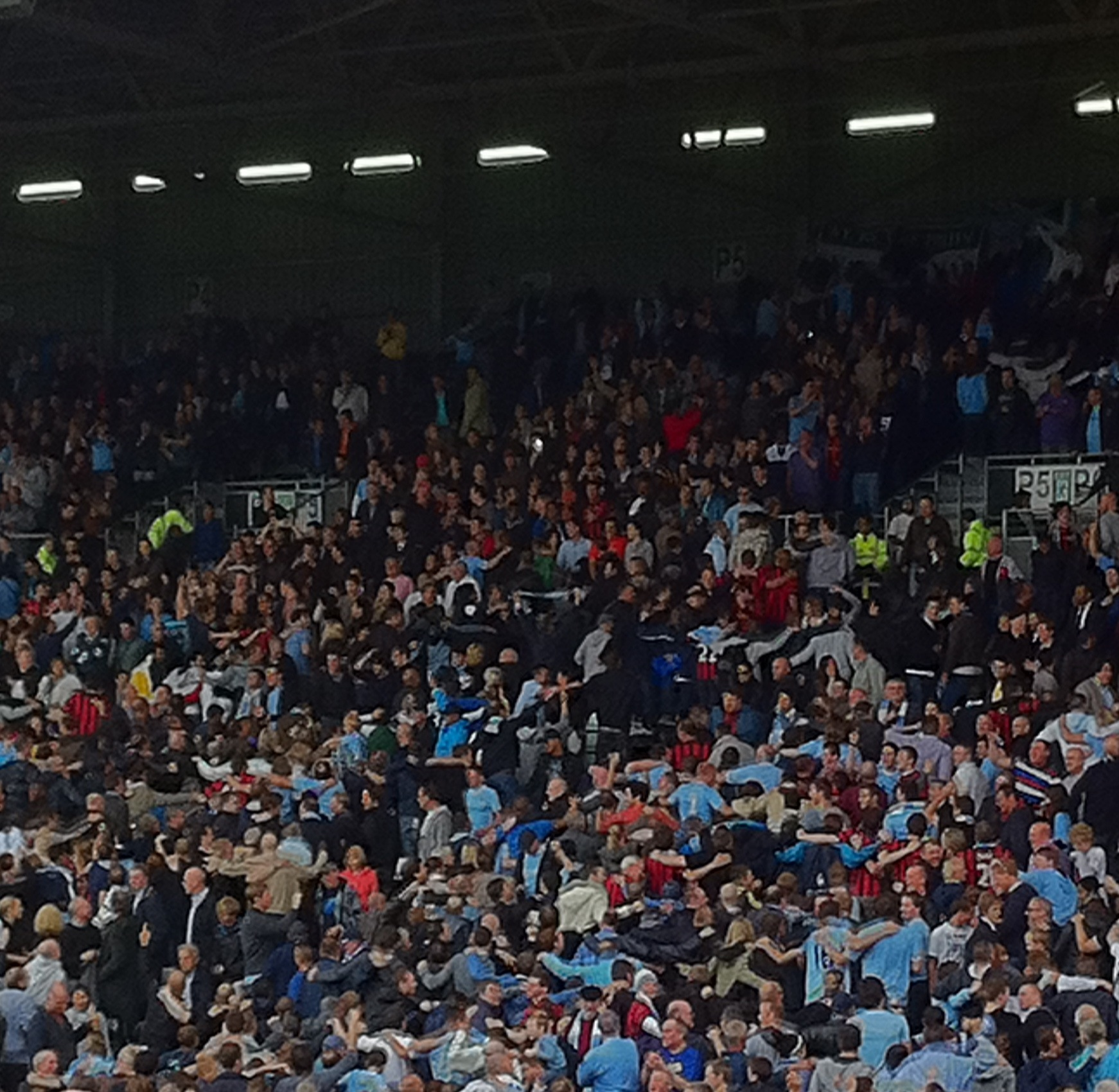
Manchester City supporters celebrating a goal against Fulham at Craven Cottage in 2011.

Another craze that City supporters decided to implement in England is a celebration or dance that has been given the nickname of 'The Poznan'. It first started on 21 October 2010 in a game against Lech Poznań in the UEFA Europa League, during the game the whole of the Poznan end turned their back to the pitch, joined arms and jumped up and down in unison.

Since, other clubs including West Ham United, Leicester City, and many more clubs up and down the country have joined in doing 'The Poznan', albeit not as frequently as the City faithful. 'The Poznan' was frequently seen performed during the FA Cup semi-final against Manchester United, and as the United line-up was being announced over the public address just before kick-off the entire City end turned their backs and did 'The Poznan' and the Manchester City players and staff did the 'Poznan' at the end of match in front of the City supporters.

=== City gallows humour ===
Manchester City supporters are also well known for their gallows humour fuelled by the many years of failure and unpredictability which is commonly associated with City and which fans enjoy wearing as a badge of their commitment. Gláuber Berti – After sitting on the bench 20 times in the 2008–09 season, the City fans were starting to joke that Gláuber Berti wasn't real and nicknamed him the invisible man. Finally though in the last game of the season against Bolton Wanderers he made an appearance in the 85th minute. This was the most popular substitution of the season and City fans greeted his every touch with applause and sang songs for him for the rest of the game. In a game against Red Bull Salzburg, the City fans found another new Brazilian they took to call Alan. When he came on as a second-half substitute, the announcer on the public address simply called him "Alan" and City fans were amused to see a Brazilian footballer with such an English name as Alan. City fans then started singing songs for him such as "Alan is Superman!". After the match, Alan thanked the City supporters for their support. In a game against West Bromwich Albion in February 2011, the big screen at the City of Manchester Stadium zoomed in on an elderly looking woman. City fans cheered, so the camera zoomed in on her a few more times throughout the match. As the game went on City fans nicknamed her 'Grandma' and started singing songs such as '75 years and she's still here' and 'Grandma do the Poznan' (which she did). She was later revealed to be Mavis Goddard from nearby Hulme. Unfortunately, she suffered a stroke and was unable to attend the 2011 FA Cup semi-final against Manchester United, a match City won 1–0 to book their place in the final, and she died in December 2011. In 2012, Porto considered complaining to UEFA over an "unsporting" chant which was aimed at their player Hulk: "You're not incredible, you're not incredible!" to the tune of "La donna è mobile". With Manchester City leading the UEFA Europa League tie 4–0 at home, unimpressed City supporters proceeded to sing "You're not incredible, you're not incredible!" to the £80 million-rated Porto striker, who had a mediocre performance.

== Rivalries ==
=== Manchester United ===
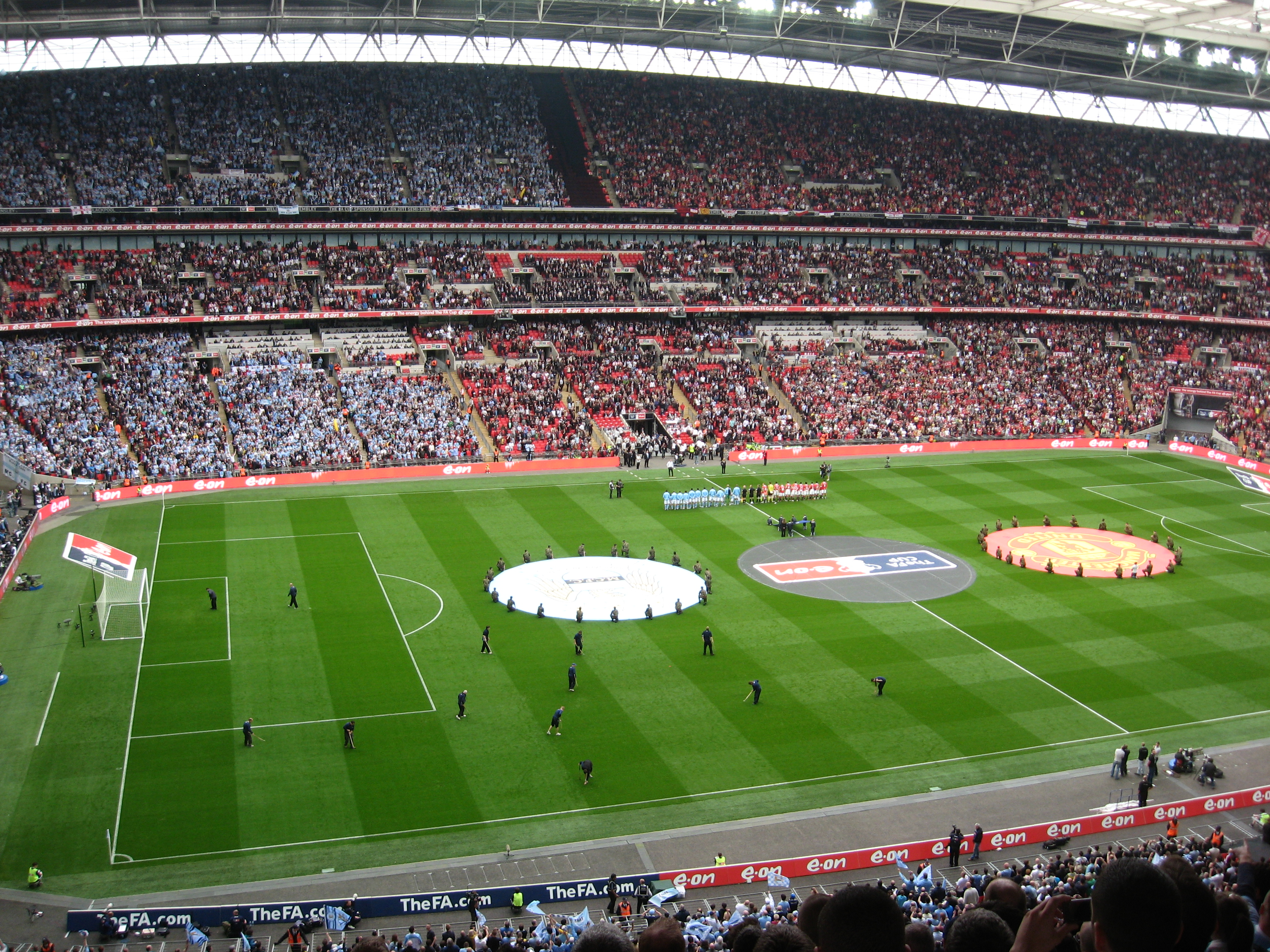
Wembley Stadium before Manchester City's 1–0 victory against Manchester United in the 2011 FA Cup semi-final. Manchester City supporters can be seen in blue.

Although City fans currently suggest Liverpool F.C are their biggest rivals, most fans still agree that Manchester United are their main rivalry, a rivalry which has reignited in last few years due to the resurgence of Manchester City as one of the top teams in England following their brief absence from the top flight at the end of the 20th century and City's re-emergence as a major club following their 2008 takeover. Both Manchester teams are regarded as among the best teams in the world, with both clubs consistently progressing to the latter stages of the UEFA Champions League in recent years and both being in the top five of football clubs by revenue. As such, Manchester is now viewed as a football city in similar vein to cities such as Madrid and Milan, although City's disappearance from the upper echelons of the league following their 1960s–70s heyday until their recent rise has led to the two teams being regarded as polar opposites, with City seen as the nouveau riche to United's old money. The two sets of fans are traditionally diametrically opposed to each other, with City's fans accusing United of arrogance and of attempting to turn the Premier League into a closed shop for elite clubs only via manipulation of the rules and of the media while they in turn are accused of using their club's money as a route to success. Additionally, and in a unique twist on a cross-city rivalry, both clubs' fans accuse each other of not representing their city, with the blue half of the city observing that their adversaries do not actually play in the city of Manchester (in Trafford) and therefore do not warrant their name, while the red half instead argue over which team has more fans inside of the city. City fans often ridicule United fans for being tourists in a play towards United's global fan base, stating that City is the club for the locals and United fans travel up from London or fly in from Europe and Asia for a day out. Following on from this City fans have often called United "Plastics" or "Glory Supporters" again in reference to their on the field dominance over several decades that made the club hugely popular with football supporters outside of Manchester. In turn due to the growth of City's global status following their 2008 takeover which brought an up turn in success on the field, United fans have said many plastic fans have jumped on City's bandwagon. The most commonly used name by City fans to describe their cross-city rivals is the term "Rags", this is due to a period after World War II where United were given use of City's Maine Road stadium after Old Trafford had been bombed by the Luftwaffe. United at the time were so poor that they had to wear kits that after a while started to resemble old rags. City fans refer to United's stadium as "The Swamp", whilst United call the City of Manchester Stadium, the "Emptyhad", which is a play on the words "Empty" and "Etihad" (the sponsored name of the stadium), which is a well known anti-City jibe that stems from the myth that City have consistently low attendances due to sporadic visible light blue empty seats at some City home games, mainly mid-week cup fixtures kicking off during the evening.

=== Other rivalries ===
As recently as 2003, in a research study conducted on football rivalries, a sample of Manchester City fans saw Bolton Wanderers as rivals after Manchester United. It also found fans of Oldham Athletic, Stockport County, Bolton Wanderers and Manchester United saw Manchester City in their top three of main rivals.

However City's elevation as one of England's and Europe's leading clubs since 2008 has led to new rivalries developing with other leading successful English and European clubs like Arsenal and Real Madrid.

In particular, Manchester City has developed a notable rivalry with Liverpool FC, currently considered one of the biggest in football. Though the two clubs had been involved in a title race in the 1976–77 season, Liverpool and City's modern rivalry began in the 2010s, with the Blues beating Liverpool to the 2013–14 title by just two points on the final day of the season. In the final of the 2015–16 League Cup, City defeated Liverpool on penalties after a 1–1 draw. The two clubs met in European competition for the first time in the 2017–18 Champions League quarter-finals, where Liverpool won 5–1 on aggregate, ultimately reaching the final and then winning the competition a year later. In the 2018–19 season, City again won the title on the final day, with the Blues' 98 points and Liverpool's 97 being the third- and fourth-highest Premier League points totals ever. The following season, Liverpool clinched the title, recording 99 points (the second-highest Premier League total ever after Manchester City's 100 in 2017–18) to finish 18 points above runners-up City. The Blues then regained the title in 2020–21 and outgunned Liverpool in another closely-fought title race in 2021–22, to finish with 93 points to Liverpool's 92. Since the 2017–18 season, Liverpool and City have produced six of the eight highest points totals since the Premier League became a 38-game league in 1995, and players and managers from Liverpool and City have dominated the individual awards in English football since 2018, with each Premier League Player of the Season award, FWA Footballer of the Year award, PFA Players' Player of the Year award and PFA Young Player of the Year award going to players from the two clubs, and each Premier League Manager of the Season award going to either Pep Guardiola or Jürgen Klopp.

Fans of both clubs have sought recognition of their club currently being the best in world football: Liverpool fans would highlight their performances and record in European competition, while criticising City for their smaller global fanbase, and controversial ownership. City fans, on the other hand, would point to their club's recent dominance of the English Premier League, domestic cup honours and status as the current top European club, Liverpool fans' sense of entitlement, and a perceived level of media bias towards their rivals.

== Supporters' groups and affiliations ==
Manchester City has various supporters' clubs such as MCFC Official Supporters' Club. In July 2010, it unified with the Centenary Supporters' Association and currently has over 400 branches across the globe on all six inhabited continents. The club honors its supporters' club with a list of branches on the outside of the spiral walkways that lead into the Etihad Stadium.

Since 2010, City has run a 'Heart of the City' scheme, in which non-UK based pubs and bars which have become host to sizable supporters clubs are recognised with a Blue Moon design blue plaque. As of May 2013, the club has awarded the Heart of the City plaque to establishments in Abu Dhabi, Baltimore, Brisbane, Chicago, Donegal, Frisco, Galway, Gothenburg, Hong Kong, Los Angeles, New York City, Oslo, Paris, Portland, Sydney and Toronto.

=== Online supporter presence ===
The club actively partakes in using the internet for social media to communicate with fans and Manchester City's online overall blog, forum and social media presence is believed to be one of the strongest by a football club online. A new, streamlined club website was launched in July 2009 and expanded to America and Arabic language soon after. The new site supports fan sites and forum, by posting links to fan sites which are listed on Manchester City's official website On the popular FIFA video game series, Manchester City were third-most-played team by online players in the 2011–12 season.

Furthermore, the club has run its own social media websites since 2009. Official sites run by the club include Twitter, Facebook and Flickr pages which fans can join. As of January 2016, the Manchester City FC – Official fanpage on Facebook has over 20 million followers. Also as of recently, City fans can also join an official fan map on the club website and now City fans can watch official club videos on the Man City channel on YouTube.

A group of City supporters have protected the clubs original name- 'St Marks (West Gorton)' via registration and trademarks, and have a website under the name selling memorabilia and telling the true story of the beginnings of the club, a story which has often been plagued by poor research and historical inaccuracies.

== Support outside the United Kingdom ==
=== Oceania ===
==== Australia ====
While Manchester City's men's team has not contained any Australian players since the early 2000s, the women's team currently has two Australian players, Mary Fowler and Alanna Kennedy. Another Australian, Hayley Raso, previously played for Manchester City before moving to Real Madrid and later Tottenham Hotspur.

Manchester City FC Australia (MCFC Australia) is the official supporters' group of Manchester City in Australia. It has branches in Sydney, Melbourne, Brisbane, Perth and Adelaidea

== Songs and chants ==
Blue Moon,
You saw me standing alone,
Without a dream in my heart,
Without a love of my own

— "Blue Moon" lyrics, Manchester City

We are not
We're not really here,
We are not
We're not really here,
Just like the fans of the invisible man,
We're not really here

— "Invisible Man" lyrics, Manchester City

=== Anthems ===
Manchester City fans song of choice and the most commonly sung is a rendition of "Blue Moon". Boys in Blue is unofficially the club's anthem, which is often played at the end of games at Eastlands. The club also play the popular "Live for City" song, which is a remixed version of "Pounding" by Doves before most games at Eastlands as well as playing a number of songs by Oasis, due to the both bands' support of the team.

=== Fan songs and chants ===
Another song frequently sung is "We're Not Really Here". The true and correct origin of the song is due to a City fan from the Prestwich & Whitefield supporters branch who died on a trip to Amsterdam in the early 90s. The branch, led by City fan Don Price sung this song about their friend in their local pub, The Forresters Arms. The full version goes "if you're drunk you will die if you don't drink you will die so it's better to be drunk than be sober when you die...just like the fans of the invisible man...we're not really here." The song then took off on a pre-season trip to Ireland in 1996 and was sung firstly at away games then at home games since that time.

Can you hear me calling
Out your name
We're Man City
and we're on the piss again
Something happened
Happening to me
Spend on my money on drugs and city
Awhooooooo
I'll follow you everywhere

— "I'll Follow You Everywhere" lyrics, Manchester City

City also regularly sing "We never win at home and we never win away", a song that mainly reflects the club's reputation for dramatic failure and inconsistent performance, the gallows humour of the fans and their suffering and perseverance following the team, but also an ironic comment on the success the club has recently experienced.

Another chant sometimes sung to the tune of the 1920s classic Kum Ba Yah, "Sheikh Mansour m’lord, Sheikh Mansour, oh lord, Sheikh Mansour", a reference to Sheikh Mansour bin Zayed Al Nahyan, Manchester City's owner, who is credited with investing heavily in the club and the rise of the club's success.

During the 2022–23 season, more chants were created such as 'I'll Follow You Everywhere' in the tune of Fleetwood Mac's Everywhere that firstly chanted during their fifth round match against Bristol City F.C. during FA Cup and a chant about their goalkeeper, Ederson and their set their defenders being the 'best defence in Europe' in the tune of Snap's "Rhythm Is A Dancer".

=== The Yaya/Kolo Song ===
In 2012, Manchester City fans started a song for Yaya Touré and his brother Kolo Touré to the tune of "No Limit", they also came up with a dance to accompany it. The song became so popular that it was adopted by other clubs fans and would be a sang in holiday destinations such as Mallorca, Ibiza, Ayia Napa, plus other sporting events like the darts and at music festivals.

== In popular culture ==
Manchester City F.C. and its fans have been portrayed in numerous music, art and TV programmes. L. S. Lowry was a Manchester City supporter who gained inspiration for his people, often known as 'matchstick men' at matches. Oasis used an animated video of Lowry's Going to the match for their single, "The Masterplan".

In film, There's Only One Jimmy Grimble was also a fictional film which focused on a young boy whose dream it was to play for Manchester City. TV programmes have had various fictional Manchester City fans who have been portrayed with differing mannerisms and personalities. DCI Gene Hunt from Life on Mars is a no nonsense police officer whilst comical characters include Young Kenny in Phoenix Nights and Dave from The Royle Family who both occasionally wear Manchester City shirts.

A feature film documenting Manchester City's 2009–10 season called Blue Moon Rising was released nationwide in 2010. The film mainly follows a group of Manchester City fans in their Renault Espace throughout the season detailing the highs and lows whilst the film will also feature exclusive footage and interviews with fans, players and staff. The season documented City narrowly losing out on fourth place and Champions League to Tottenham Hotspur and City being knocked out of the League Cup by Manchester United in the semi-finals. Coincidentally, the following season saw a reversal of fortunes, with City beating Tottenham 1–0 to seal Champions League football, and beating United in the FA Cup semi-final before going on to the lift the FA Cup for the first time in 42 years.

The 2018 film The Keeper, which focuses on the life of City goalie Bert Trautmann, depicts fans throughout the film. Also, one of the main roles was played by a City fan, John Henshaw.

In the TV series Ted Lasso, the club is a fictional version of the real club. However, the current manager of the club is Pep Guardiola himself. The manager made a cameo in season 3, overseeing the match against their arch-nemesis AFC Richmond, where he gave some advice to Ted Lasso, the manager of Richmond. The club beat Richmond many times, but in the final season, Richmond managed to defeat them.

== Quotations ==
- "Then there are the City supporters, many of whom have developed ulcers and who have grown prematurely grey for the cause. I have seen them at Plymouth and Newcastle, Portsmouth and Middlesbrough year after year, 'like Patience on a monument smiling at grief'. They have cursed, applauded, demanded, cajoled, laughed and wept. They have sworn never again to take out season tickets, never again to support their team. And always they have come back, generation after generation. As Mr Mercer put it on Saturday: 'I'm as pleased for our supporters as I am for anyone. Like the players they deserve to have their perseverance rewarded.'"

Journalist Eric Todd in a match report for The Guardian following Manchester City's victory against Newcastle United to win the league title in 1968.

- "Sometimes we're good and sometimes we're bad but when we're good, at least we're much better than we used to be and when we are bad we're just as bad as we always used to be, so that's got to be good hasn't it?".

Mark Radcliffe, BBC Radio 1 presenter (November 2001)

- "My husband's time as manager of City, from 1965 through to the early 1970s, was one of the most enjoyable periods of his life. He loved the club, the supporters, the players, the hope and the atmosphere of that period".

Norah Mercer, Joe Mercer's wife, who continued to regularly attend City matches until her death in 2013.

- "To support United is too easy. It's convenience supporting. It makes life too easy. There is no challenge. It is a cowardly form of escapism, a sell-out to the forces of evil. United fans have no soul and will spend their eternity neck deep in boiling vomit. City fans retain their soul and will spend their eternity forever reliving the moment their team beat Newcastle 4–3 away from home to win the League Championship in 1968, beating United into second place."

Paul Morley, journalist (1998)
