= Sulaiman Al-Fahim =

President of the Arab Union for Real Estate Development

Sulaiman Al-Fahim سليمان الفهيم
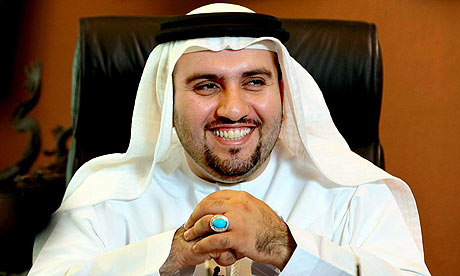
- Born: 1976 or 1977 (age 49–50); Dubai, United Arab Emirates
- Education: American University; United Arab Emirates University
- Occupation: Businessman
- Website: sulaimanalfahim.com

Sulaiman Abdul-Karim Mohammed Al-Fahim (born 1976 or 1977) is an Emirati television personality and self described billionaire businessman in the UAE real estate sector. He was involved in the deal in which the Abu Dhabi royal family obtained Manchester City F.C., and was briefly owner of Portsmouth F.C.. In 2018, he was convicted and sentenced to five years in jail by a UAE court for stealing £5 million.

== Early life and education ==
Al-Fahim was born in Dubai in 1977. He obtained his master's degree in Finance and Real Estate from the American University in Washington, D.C. He has claimed that he has a PhD in Real Estate from American University, but there is no record of him earning a PhD from the school and the school does not offer a PhD in real estate. Nonetheless, Al-Fahim uses the honorific "Dr."

In 1998, Al-Fahim lost his parents and brother in a car accident.

== Career ==
Al-Fahim heads the real estate company Hydra Properties, which is owned by the Royal Group, an investment conglomerate headed by Tahnoun bin Zayed Al Nahyan, a member of the royal family in Abu Dhabi.

Al-Fahim was president of UAE Chess Federation from 2008 until 2012. Al Fahim published the book Brand Builder. Al-Fahim was the founder and host of a business themed reality television show Hydra Executives which was launched in Spring 2008. It had a run of two seasons.

=== Manchester City F.C. ===
Al-Fahim was involved in the deal in which the Abu Dhabi royal family took over Manchester City in 2008. He looked at various clubs on behalf of the Abu Dhabi royal family and suggested that they buy Manchester City. Al-Fahim signed the first agreement (Memorandum of Understanding) with the legal representative of the former Prime Minister of Thailand, Thaksin Shinawatra, who owned Manchester City. Al-Fahim then presented the offer to the Abu Dhabi United Group where Mansour bin Zayed Al Nahyan took the final agreement forward and took over Manchester City.

=== Portsmouth F.C. ===
In 2009, Al-Fahim owned Portsmouth F.C. for six weeks. In 2018, he was convicted and sentenced to five years in jail for stealing £5 million from his wife to fund the purchase of Portsmouth. In the aftermath of Al-Fahim's brief stint at Portsmouth, the Premier League tightened its rules on ownership.
