= South African Premiership =

Betway Premiership

Betway Premiership
- Organising body: Premier Soccer League
- Founded: 1996; 30 years ago
- Country: South Africa
- Confederation: CAF
- Number of clubs: 16
- Level on pyramid: 1
- Relegation to: Motsepe Foundation Championship
- Domestic cups: MTN 8; Nedbank Cup
- League cup: Carling Knockout Cup
- International cups: CAF Champions League; CAF Confederation Cup
- Current champions: Orlando Pirates (5th title) (2025–26)
- Most championships: Mamelodi Sundowns (15 titles)
- Top scorer: Peter Shalulile (130 goals)
- Broadcasters: SuperSport; SABC Sport
- Website: PSL.co.za
- Current: 2026–27 South African Premiership

The South African Premiership, also known as the Betway Premiership for sponsorship reasons, and commonly referred to as the PSL after its governing body, is a professional soccer league in South Africa and the highest level of the South African soccer league system. It has been organised since 1996.

Orlando Pirates F.C. are the current champions, winning the 2025–26 South African Premiership, breaking Mamelodi Sundowns' eight year winning streak. This marked their fifth league title in the PSL era and their 10th overall. This also marks their first league title since the 2011–12 season.

== History ==
The league was founded in 1996 after an agreement between the National Soccer League and the remnants of the National Professional Soccer League. The former name still exists today for legal purposes, with the Premier Soccer League being the trade name of the new league administrator.

The league was reduced from 18 to 16 teams after the end of the 2001–02 season to avoid fixture congestion, causing the disbandment of two teams; Ria Stars and Free State Stars, though the latter was reformed and competing as of the 2020–21 season. In 2004, a match-fixing scandal rocked the soccer landscape in South Africa. An investigation codenamed "Operation Dribble" was launched by the police system of South Africa police in June 2004. More than 40 arrests were made, ranging from club bosses to match commissioners, referees and their assistants. Kaizer Chiefs successfully defended their league title in 2005 after they won the prestigious trophy in 2004 for the first time in a decade. The 2005–06 season saw Mamelodi Sundowns capturing the title for a fourth time. Since the 2017–18 season, they have dominated the league, winning seven consecutive titles.

In 2007, the PSL signed a television deal with SuperSport worth R 1.6 billion, which was the biggest sporting deal in the history of the country and ranked the league into the top 15 in the world in terms of commercial broadcast deals. In the same year, ABSA replaced Castle Lager as the title sponsor, with the latter having sponsored the league since its inception. SuperSport United won 3 league titles in a row between 2008 and 2010.

As of 2025, the league is rated third in Africa according to the CAF 5-year ranking system.

For the 2018–19 season, the PSL gives each club a monthly grant of R 2 million, with funds coming from the television broadcasting rights and national sponsorships, with the league champion earning R 10 million.

In 2019, ABSA increased their sponsorship deal to the PSL to R 39.9 million, which meant that the league winners would secure R 15 million. ABSA would however announce its cancellation of its sponsorship with the PSL a year later on 4 June 2020.

On 24 September 2020, DStv were announced as the new sponsor, with the league being rebranded as the DStv Premiership. MultiChoice also announced that Showmax would replace DStv as the jersey sponsor of SuperSport United F.C. so the latter would be independent to sponsor the league outright.

On the 24th of July 2024, it was announced that Betway would be sponsoring the league, with DStv's contract ending a year early due to MultiChoice's financial troubles. This is one of the biggest sponsorships in South African football history worth R900-Million for the term of 3 years.

=== CEOs ===
- (England) Trevor Phillips: 1996–1998
- (South Africa) Joe Ndlela: 1998–2000
- (South Africa) Robin Petersen: 2000–2001 (resigned)
- (England) Trevor Phillips: 2002–2007
- (Norway) Kjetil Siem: 2007–2011
- (South Africa) Zola Majavu: 2011 (resigned)
- (South Africa) Stanley Matthews: 2012 (resigned)
- (South Africa) Cambridge Mokanyane: 2013 (acting)
- (South Africa) Brand de Villers: 2013–2015
- (South Africa) Mato Madlala: 2016 – present (acting)

== Qualification for CAF competitions ==
=== Association ranking for the 2025–26 CAF club season ===
The association ranking for the 2025–26 CAF Champions League and the 2025–26 CAF Confederation Cup will be based on results from each CAF club competition from 2020–21 to the 2024–25 season.

Legend

- CL: CAF Champions League
- CC: CAF Confederation Cup
- ≥: Associations points might increase on basis of its clubs performance in 2024–25 CAF club competitions
- Associations ranked 1–12 are eligible to enter two teams in each CAF club competition.

Rank			Association	2020–21 (× 1)		2021–22 (× 2)		2022–23 (× 3)		2023–24 (× 4)		2024–25 (× 5)		Total
2025	2024	Mvt	Association	CL	CC	CL	CC	CL	CC	CL	CC	CL	CC	Total
1	1	—	Egypt	8	3	7	4	8	2.5	7	7	10	4	190.5
2	2	—	Morocco	4	6	9	5	8	2	2	4	5	5	142
3	4	+1	South Africa	8	2	5	4	4	3	4	1.5	9	3	131
4	3	-1	Algeria	6	5	7	1	6	5	2	3	5	5	130
5	6	+1	Tanzania	3	0.5	0	2	3	4	6	0	2	4	82.5
6	5	-1	Tunisia	4	3	5	1	4	2	6	1	3	0.5	82.5
7	8	+1	Angola	1	0	5	0	2	0	3	1.5	2	2	55
8	7	-1	DR Congo	4	0	0	3	1	2	4	0	2	0	45
9	9	—	Sudan	3	0	3	0	3	0	2	0	3	0	41
10	11	+1	Ivory Coast	0	0	0	1	0	3	3	0	1	2	38
11	10	-1	Libya	0	0.5	0	5	0	0.5	0	3	0	0	24
12	12	—	Nigeria	0	2	0	0	0	2	0	2	0	1	21

== Sponsorship ==
The league has had title sponsorships since its inception. Like the EFL League One and the Premier League divisions in England, the league takes its title sponsor's name to determine its official common name:

- 1996–2007: Castle Lager (Castle Premiership)
- 2007–2020: ABSA (ABSA Premiership)
- 2020–2024: DStv (DStv Premiership)
- 2024–present: Betway (Betway Premiership)

== Format ==
As of the 2024–25 season, the league is composed of 16 teams competing from August to May each season, similar to the format of most European football leagues. Each team plays the other teams twice in a double round-robin format using the three points for a win system.

At the conclusion of each season, the champion and runner-up of the Premiership qualify for the CAF Champions League, while the 3rd-place team and the Nedbank Cup champions qualify for the CAF Confederation Cup. The bottom team in the league is automatically relegated and replaced by the winner of the Motsepe Foundation Championship, whilst the team finishing immediately above the bottom team enters a mini-league playoff series with the 2nd and 3rd-placed league-finished teams of the National First Division, with the playoff winners earning their place in the Premiership for the following season.

== Broadcasting ==
The league's broadcaster is SuperSport, who in turn sub-leases the broadcasting rights to the SABC, so as to broadcast some matches on public television in South Africa. SuperSport was awarded an initial $277 million 5-year broadcast/TV rights deal in 2007 by the Premier Soccer League to help commercialize the league globally beyond South Africa. matches on sunset times between Tuesdays and Fridays and on weekends whereas the SABC telecast matches played on Wednesday nights and on weekends.

Since 2016, as SuperSport is a brand owned by the MultiChoice Group, the league is available to watch live and on demand via their specified services; the DStv App (formerly DStv Mobile and DStv Now) and Showmax Pro. Both are accessible via the DStv website for PC and Mac and as mobile apps on Android and iOS/iPadOS for mobile phones, tablets and Smart TVs.

=== Previous winners, runners-up, relegated and promoted teams ===
Season	Winner	Runner-up	Relegated	Promoted to the following season
1996–97	Manning Rangers	Kaizer Chiefs	Michau Warriors, Witbank Aces	Santos, African Wanderers
1997–98	Mamelodi Sundowns	Orlando Pirates	African Wanderers, Real Rovers	Seven Stars, Dynamos
1998–99	Mamelodi Sundowns	Kaizer Chiefs	Dynamos, Vaal Professionals	African Wanderers, Tembisa Classic
1999–2000	Mamelodi Sundowns	Orlando Pirates	AmaZulu, Mother City	Golden Arrows, Ria Stars
2000–01	Orlando Pirates	Kaizer Chiefs	Bloemfontein Celtic, African Wanderers	AmaZulu, Black Leopards
2001–02	Santos	SuperSport United	AmaZulu, Thembisa Classic	African Wanderers, Dynamos
2002–03	Orlando Pirates (2)	SuperSport United	Umtata Bush Bucks, African Wanderers	AmaZulu, Silver Stars
2003–04	Kaizer Chiefs	Ajax Cape Town	Hellenic, Zulu Royals	Bush Bucks, Bloemfontein Celtic
2004–05	Kaizer Chiefs	Orlando Pirates	Manning Rangers, Wits University	Free State Stars, Tembisa Classic
2005–06	Mamelodi Sundowns (5)	Orlando Pirates	Free State Stars, Bush Bucks	Wits University, Benoni Premier United
2006–07	Mamelodi Sundowns (5)	Platinum Stars	Maritzburg United	Free State Stars
2007–08	SuperSport United	Ajax Cape Town	Black Leopards, Jomo Cosmos	Maritzburg United, Bay United
2008–09	SuperSport United	Orlando Pirates	Bay United, Thanda Royal Zulu	Jomo Cosmos, Mpumalanga Black Aces
2009–10	SuperSport United	Mamelodi Sundowns	Jomo Cosmos	Vasco da Gama
2010–11	Orlando Pirates (3)	Ajax Cape Town	Mpumalanga Black Aces, Vasco da Gama	Jomo Cosmos, Black Leopards
2011–12	Orlando Pirates (3)	Moroka Swallows	Santos, Jomo Cosmos	University of Pretoria, Chippa United
2012–13	Kaizer Chiefs (3)	Platinum Stars	Chippa United, Black Leopards	Mpumalanga Black Aces, Polokwane City
2013–14	Mamelodi Sundowns (6)	Kaizer Chiefs	Golden Arrows	Chippa United
2014–15	Kaizer Chiefs (4)	Mamelodi Sundowns	Moroka Swallows, AmaZulu	Golden Arrows, Jomo Cosmos
2015–16	Mamelodi Sundowns (7)	Bidvest Wits	Jomo Cosmos, University of Pretoria	Baroka, Highlands Park
2016–17	Bidvest Wits	Mamelodi Sundowns	Highlands Park	AmaZulu
2017–18	Mamelodi Sundowns (15)	Orlando Pirates	Ajax Cape Town, Platinum Stars	Highlands Park, Black Leopards
2018–19	Mamelodi Sundowns (15)	Orlando Pirates	Free State Stars	Stellenbosch
2019–20	Mamelodi Sundowns (15)	Kaizer Chiefs	Polokwane City	Moroka Swallows
2020–21	Mamelodi Sundowns (15)	AmaZulu	Black Leopards	Sekhukhune United
2021–22	Mamelodi Sundowns (15)	Cape Town City	Baroka	Richards Bay
2022–23	Mamelodi Sundowns (15)	Orlando Pirates	Marumo Gallants, Maritzburg United	Polokwane City, Cape Town Spurs
2023–24	Mamelodi Sundowns (15)	Orlando Pirates	Cape Town Spurs	Magesi
2024–25	Mamelodi Sundowns (15)	Orlando Pirates	Cape Town City	Durban City Orbit College
2025–26	Orlando Pirates (5)	Mamelodi Sundowns	Orbit College, Magesi	Kruger United, Milford

== League titles by club ==
Team	Titles	Years
Mamelodi Sundowns	15	1997–98, 1998–99, 1999–2000, 2005–06, 2006–07, 2013–14, 2015–16, 2017–18, 2018–19, 2019–20, 2020–21, 2021–22, 2022–23, 2023–24, 2024–25
Orlando Pirates	5	2000–01, 2002–03, 2010–11, 2011–12, 2025–26
Kaizer Chiefs	4	2003–04, 2004–05, 2012–13, 2014–15
SuperSport United	3	2007–08, 2008–09, 2009–10
Manning Rangers	1	1996–97
Santos	1	2001–02
Bidvest Wits	1	2016–17

== Manager records ==
=== League winning managers ===
Season(s)	Winner(s)	Manager(s)
1996–97	Manning Rangers	(South Africa) Gordon Igesund
1997–98	Mamelodi Sundowns	(Romania) Ted Dumitru
1998–99	Mamelodi Sundowns	(Romania) Ted Dumitru
1999–00	Mamelodi Sundowns	(France) Paul Dolezar
2000–01	Orlando Pirates	(South Africa) Gordon Igesund (2)
2001–02	Santos	(South Africa) Gordon Igesund (2)
2002–03	Orlando Pirates	(Zimbabwe) Roy Barreto
2003–04	Kaizer Chiefs	(Romania) Ted Dumitru (4)
2004–05	Kaizer Chiefs	(Romania) Ted Dumitru (4)
2005–06	Mamelodi Sundowns	(South Africa) Neil Tovey & (Argentina) Miguel Gamondi
2006–07	Mamelodi Sundowns	(South Africa) Gordon Igesund (4)
2007–08	SuperSport United	(South Africa) Gavin Hunt
2008–09	SuperSport United	(South Africa) Gavin Hunt
2009–10	SuperSport United	(South Africa) Gavin Hunt
2010–11	Orlando Pirates	(Netherlands) Ruud Krol
2011–12	Orlando Pirates	(Peru) Augusto Palacios
2012–13	Kaizer Chiefs	(Scotland) Stuart Baxter
2013–14	Mamelodi Sundowns	(South Africa) Pitso Mosimane
2014–15	Kaizer Chiefs	(Scotland) Stuart Baxter (2)
2015–16	Mamelodi Sundowns	(South Africa) Pitso Mosimane
2016–17	Bidvest Wits	(South Africa) Gavin Hunt (4)
2017–18	Mamelodi Sundowns	(South Africa) Pitso Mosimane (5)
2018–19	Mamelodi Sundowns	(South Africa) Pitso Mosimane (5)
2019–20	Mamelodi Sundowns	(South Africa) Pitso Mosimane (5)
2020–21	Mamelodi Sundowns	(South Africa) Manqoba Mngqithi & (South Africa) Rhulani Mokwena
2021–22	Mamelodi Sundowns	(South Africa) Manqoba Mngqithi (2) & (South Africa) Rhulani Mokwena
2022–23	Mamelodi Sundowns	(South Africa) Rhulani Mokwena (4)
2023–24	Mamelodi Sundowns	(South Africa) Rhulani Mokwena (4)
2024–25	Mamelodi Sundowns	(Portugal) Miguel Cardoso
2025–26	Orlando Pirates	(Morocco) Abdeslam Ouaddou

=== Most successful managers ===
Winning managers
Manager(s)	Club(s)	Win(s)	Winning year(s)
(South Africa) Pitso Mosimane	Mamelodi Sundowns (5)	5	2013–14, 2015–16, 2017–18, 2018–19, 2019–20
(Romania) Ted Dumitru	Mamelodi Sundowns (2), Kaizer Chiefs (2)	4	1997–98, 1998–99, 2003–04, 2004–05
(South Africa) Gavin Hunt	SuperSport United (3), Bidvest Wits	4	2007–08, 2008–09, 2009–10, 2016–17
(South Africa) Gordon Igesund	Manning Rangers, Orlando Pirates, Santos, Mamelodi Sundowns	4	1996–97, 2000–01, 2001–02, 2006–07
(South Africa) Rhulani Mokwena	Mamelodi Sundowns (4)	4	2020–21, 2021–22, 2022–23, 2023–24
(Scotland) Stuart Baxter	Kaizer Chiefs (2)	2	2012–13, 2014–15
(South Africa) Manqoba Mngqithi	Mamelodi Sundowns (2)	2	2020–21, 2021–22

- (South Africa) Gordon Igesund is the only manager to have won the league with 4 clubs; Manning Rangers 1996-97, Orlando Pirates 2000-01, Santos 2001-02, Mamelodi Sundowns 2006-07.
- (South Africa) Rulani Mokwena become the only manager to have retained the league title 4 times in a row (4) Mamelodi Sundowns 2020–21, 2021–22, 2022–23, 2023-24; breaking previous record of (South Africa) Gavin Hunt and (South Africa) Pitso Mosimane of the managers that have retained the title the most times; (3) SuperSport United 2007–08, 2008–09, 2009–10, (3) Mamelodi Sundowns 2017–18, 2018–19, 2019–20 respectively.
- Seven foreign managers have won the league, with (Romania) Ted Dumitru having won the most titles, 4.
- Since the founding of the Premiership in 1996, the following two records Ernst Middendorp holds remain unsurpassed: he has coached eight different top-flight clubs in the Premiership, and has been appointed on twelve occasions as the permanent head coach of a top-flight team competing in the Premiership.

== League records ==
- Ever presents: Kaizer Chiefs, Mamelodi Sundowns, Orlando Pirates
- Most Premiership titles: 15 – Mamelodi Sundowns (1997/98), (1998/99), (1999/00), (2005/06), (2006/07), (2013/14), (2015/16), (2017/18), (2018/19), (2019/20), (2020/21), (2021/22), (2022/23), (2023/24), (2024/2025)
- Biggest Premiership win: 7-4 - Mamelodi Sundowns F.C. vs Siwelele F.C. (2025/2026), 8–1 – SuperSport United vs Zulu Royals (2003/04), 8-1 Orlando Pirates F.C. vs Marumo Gallants F.C. (2024/2025)
- Most goals scored in a season: 73 – Kaizer Chiefs (1998/99)
- Most goals conceded in a season: 85 – Mother City (1999/00)
- Most points in a season: 75 – Mamelodi Sundowns (1998/99) & (1999/00) and Kaizer Chiefs (1998/99)
- Most points in a season (30 games): 73 – Mamelodi Sundowns (2023/24)

== League participants ==
As of the 2026–27 season. Current participants are in bold.

Club	Number of seasons in Premiership	Seasons
**Kaizer Chiefs**	31	all
**Mamelodi Sundowns**	31	all
**Orlando Pirates**	31	all
SuperSport United	29	all until 2025–26
**Lamontville Golden Arrows**	25	2000–01, 2001–02, 2002–03, 2003–04, 2004–05, 2005–06, 2006–07, 2007–08, 2008–09, 2009–10, 2010–11, 2011–12, 2012–13, 2013–14, 2015–16, 2016–17, 2018–19, 2019–20, 2020–21, 2021–22, 2022–23, 2023–24, 2024–25, 2025–26, 2026-27
**AmaZulu**	23	1996–97, 1997–98, 1998–99, 1999–2000, 2001–02, 2003–04, (Note: Amazulu participated as Zulu Royals in 2003/04) 2006–07, 2007–08, 2008–09, 2009–10, 2010–11, 2011–12, 2012–13, 2013–14, 2014–15, 2019–20, 2020–21, 2021–22, 2022–23, 2023–24, 2024–25, 2025–26, 2026-27
Bidvest Wits	23	1996–97, 1997–98, 1998–99, 1999–2000, 2000–01, 2001–02, 2002–03, 2003–04, 2004–05, 2006–07, 2007–08, 2008–09, 2009–10, 2010–11, 2011–12, 2012–13, 2013–14, 2014–15, 2015–16, 2016–17, 2017–18, 2018–19, 2019–20
Moroka Swallows	23	1996–97, 1997–98, 1998–99, 1999–2000, 2000–01, 2001–02, 2002–03, 2003–04, 2004–05, 2005–06, 2006–07, 2007–08, 2008–09, 2009–10, 2010–11, 2011–12, 2012–13, 2013–14, 2014–15, 2020–21, 2021–22, 2022–23, 2023–24
Bloemfontein Celtic	22	1996–97, 1997–98, 1998–99, 1999–2000, 2000–01, 2004–05, 2005–06, 2006–07, 2007–08, 2008–09, 2009–10, 2010–11, 2011–12, 2012–13, 2013–14, 2014–15, 2015–16, 2016–17, 2017–18, 2018–19, 2019–20, 2020–21
Cape Town Spurs/Ajax Cape Town (Note: In 1999, Cape Town Spurs and Seven Stars were merged to create Ajax Cape Town. In 2020, Ajax CT ended their association with Dutch club AFC Ajax, and it was renamed Cape Town Spurs)	22	1996–97, 1997–98, 1998–99, 1999–2000, 2000–01, 2001–02, 2002–03, 2003–04, 2004–05, 2005–06, 2006–07, 2007–08, 2008–09, 2009–10, 2010–11, 2011–12, 2012–13, 2013–14, 2014–15, 2015–16, 2016–17, 2023–24
Free State Stars	19	1996–97, 1997–98, 1998–99, (Note: Free State Stars participated as Qwa Qwa Stars in 1996/97, 1997/98 and 1998/99) 1999–2000, 2000–01, 2001–02, 2005–06, 2007–08, 2008–09, 2009–10, 2010–11, 2011–12, 2012–13, 2013–14, 2014–15, 2015–16, 2016–17, 2017–18, 2018–19
**Durban City** / Maritzburg United	18	2006–07, 2008–09, 2009–10, 2010–11, 2011–12, 2012–13, 2013–14, 2014–15, 2015–16, 2016–17, 2017–18, 2018–19, 2019–20, 2020–21, 2021–22, 2022–23, 2025–26, 2026-27
Jomo Cosmos	15	1996–97, 1997–98, 1998–99, 1999–2000, 2000–01, 2001–02, 2002–03, 2003–04, 2004–05, 2005–06, 2006–07, 2007–08, 2009–10, 2011–12, 2015–16
Santos	15	1997–98, 1998–99, 1999–2000, 2000–01, 2001–02, 2002–03, 2003–04, 2004–05, 2005–06, 2006–07, 2007–08, 2008–09, 2009–10, 2010–11, 2011–12
**Chippa United**	14	2012–13, 2014–15, 2015–16, 2016–17, 2017–18, 2018–19, 2019–20, 2020–21, 2021–22, 2022–23, 2023–24, 2024–25, 2025–26, 2026-27
Platinum Stars	14	2003–04, 2004–05, 2005–06, 2006–07, (Note: Platinum Stars participated as Silver Stars in 2003/04, 2004/05, 2005/06 and 2006/07) 2007–08, 2008–09, 2009–10, 2010–11, 2011–12, 2012–13, 2013–14, 2014–15, 2015–16, 2016–17
Black Leopards	11	2001–02, 2002–03, 2003–04, 2004–05, 2005–06, 2006–07, 2007–08, 2011–12, 2012–13, 2019–20, 2020–21
**Polokwane City**	11	2013–14, 2014–15, 2015–16, 2016–17, 2017–18, 2018–19, 2019–20, 2023–24, 2024–25, 2025–26, 2026-27
Bush Bucks	9	1996–97, 1997–98, 1998–99, 1999–2000, 2000–01, 2001–02, 2002–03, 2004–05, 2005–06
Cape Town City	9	2016–17, 2017–18, 2018–19, 2019–20, 2020–21, 2021–22, 2022–23, 2023–24, 2024–25
Manning Rangers	9	1996–97, 1997–98, 1998–99, 1999–2000, 2000–01, 2001–02, 2002–03, 2003–04, 2004–05
Hellenic	8	1996–97, 1997–98, 1998–99, 1999–2000, 2000–01, 2001–02, 2002–03, 2003–04
**Stellenbosch**	8	2019-20, 2020–21, 2021–22, 2022–23, 2023–24, 2024–25, 2025–26, 2026-27
**TS Galaxy**	7	2020–21, 2021–22, 2022–23, 2023–24, 2024–25, 2025–26, 2026-27
Baroka	6	2016–17, 2017–18, 2018–19, 2019–20, 2020–21, 2021–22
Mpumalanga Black Aces	6	1996–97, (Note: Participated as Witbank Aces in 1996/1997) 2009–10, 2010–11, 2013–14, 2014–15, 2015–16
**Sekhukhune**	6	2021–22, 2022–23, 2023–24, 2024–25, 2025–26, 2026-27
Dynamos	5	1998–99, 2002–03, 2003–04, 2004–05, 2005–06
**Marumo Gallants**	5	2021–22, 2022–23, 2024–25, 2025–26, 2026-27
**Richards Bay**	5	2022–23, 2023–24, 2024–25, 2025–26, 2026-27
African Wanderers	4	1997–98, 1999–2000, 2000–01, 2002–03
Tembisa Classic	4	1999–2000, 2000–01, 2001–02, 2005–06
Royal AM	4	2021–22, 2022–23, 2023–24, 2024–25
University of Pretoria	4	2012–13, 2013–14, 2014–15, 2015–16
Highlands Park	3	2016–17, 2017–18, 2019–20
Magesi	2	2024–25, 2025–26
Vaal Professionals	3	1996–97, 1997–98, 1998–99
Real Rovers	2	1996–97, 1997–98
Ria Stars	2	2000–01, 2001–02
**Siwelele**	2	2025–26, 2026-27
Thanda Royal Zulu	2	2007–08, 2008–09
Bay United	1	2008–09
Benoni Premier United	1	2006–07
**Kruger United**	1	2026-27
Michau Warriors	1	1996–97
**Milford**	1	2026-27
Mother City	1	1999–2000
Orbit College	1	2025–26
Seven Stars	1	1998–99
Tshakhuma Tsha Madzivhandila	1	2020–21
Vasco da Gama	1	2010–11

== Major titles ==
Domestic Competitions					International
Year	NPSL Castle League	Life Challenge Cup	Datsun Challenge	BP Top 8	FIFA & CAF
1971	Orlando Pirates (1)	Kaizer Chiefs (1)	–	–	–
1972	AmaZulu (1)	Kaizer Chiefs (2)	–	Orlando Pirates (1)	–
1973	Orlando Pirates (2)	Orlando Pirates (1)	–	Orlando Pirates (2)	–
1974	Kaizer Chiefs (1)	Orlando Pirates (2)	–	Kaizer Chiefs (1)	–
1975	Orlando Pirates (3)	Orlando Pirates (3)	–	Moroka Swallows (1)	–
		Benson and Hedges Trophy			
1976	Orlando Pirates (4)	Kaizer Chiefs (3)	–	Kaizer Chiefs (2)	–
1977	Kaizer Chiefs (2)	Kaizer Chiefs (4)	–	Kaizer Chiefs (3)	–
		Mainstay Cup			
1978	Lusitano (1)	Wits University (1)	–	Orlando Pirates (3)	–
1979	Kaizer Chiefs (3)	Kaizer Chiefs (5)	–	Moroka Swallows (2)	–
1980	Highlands Park (1)	Orlando Pirates (4)	–	Witbank Black Aces (1)	–
1981	Kaizer Chiefs (4)	Kaizer Chiefs (6)	–	Kaizer Chiefs (4)	–
1982	Durban City (1959) (1)	Kaizer Chiefs (7)	Arcadia Shepherds (1)	Kaizer Chiefs (5)	–
1983	Durban City (1959) (2)	Moroka Swallows (1)	Kaizer Chiefs (1)	Orlando Pirates (4)	–
			John Player Special (JPS) Knockout Cup		
1984	Kaizer Chiefs (5)	Kaizer Chiefs (8)	Kaizer Chiefs (2)	Wits University (1)	–
	National Soccer League				
1985	Durban Bush Bucks (1)	Bloemfontein Celtic (1)	Wits University (1)	Kaizer Chiefs (6)	–
1986	Rangers (1)	Mamelodi Sundowns (1)	Kaizer Chiefs (3)	Arcadia Shepherds (1)	–
1987	Jomo Cosmos (1)	Kaizer Chiefs (9)	Durban Bush Bucks (1)	Kaizer Chiefs (7)	–
		Bob Save Super Bowl			
1988	Mamelodi Sundowns (1)	Orlando Pirates (5)	Kaizer Chiefs (4)	Mamelodi Sundowns (1)	–
1989	Kaizer Chiefs (6)	Moroka Swallows (2)	Kaizer Chiefs (5)	Kaizer Chiefs (8)	–
1990	Mamelodi Sundowns (2)	Jomo Cosmos (1)	Mamelodi Sundowns (1)	Mamelodi Sundowns (2)	–
1991	Kaizer Chiefs (7)	Moroka Swallows (3)	Dynamos (1)	Kaizer Chiefs (9)	–
			Coca-Cola Cup		
1992	Kaizer Chiefs (8)	Kaizer Chiefs (10)	AmaZulu (1)	Kaizer Chiefs (10)	–
1993	Mamelodi Sundowns (3)	Witbank Black Aces (1)	Umtata Bucks (1)	Orlando Pirates (5)	–
1994	Orlando Pirates (5)	Vaal Professionals (1)	Qwa Qwa Stars (1)	Kaizer Chiefs (11)	–
1995	Cape Town Spurs (1)	Cape Town Spurs (1)	Wits University (2)	Wits University (2)	CL: Orlando Pirates (1)
	South African Premiership				
1996	–	Orlando Pirates (6)	Umtata Bush Bucks (2)	Orlando Pirates (6)	SC: Orlando Pirates (1)
			Rothmans Cup		
1997	Manning Rangers (1)	–	Kaizer Chiefs (6)	–	–
1998	Mamelodi Sundowns (4)	Mamelodi Sundowns (2)	Kaizer Chiefs (7)	–	–
1999	Mamelodi Sundowns (5)	SuperSport United (1)	Mamelodi Sundowns (2)	–	–
2000	Mamelodi Sundowns (6)	Kaizer Chiefs (11)	Ajax Cape Town (1)	Orlando Pirates (7)	–
			Coca-Cola Cup		
2001	Orlando Pirates (6)	Santos (1)	Kaizer Chiefs (8)	Kaizer Chiefs (12)	CWC: Kaizer Chiefs (1)
2002	Santos (1)	–	Jomo Cosmos (1)	Santos (1)	–
		ABSA Cup		SAA Super 8	
2003	Orlando Pirates (7)	Santos (2)	Kaizer Chiefs (9)	Jomo Cosmos (1)	–
2004	Kaizer Chiefs (9)	Moroka Swallows (4)	Kaizer Chiefs (10)	SuperSport United (1)	–
2005	Kaizer Chiefs (10)	SuperSport United (2)	Jomo Cosmos (2)	Bloemfontein Celtic (1)	–
			Telkom Knockout Cup		
2006	Mamelodi Sundowns (7)	Kaizer Chiefs (12)	Silver Stars (1)	Kaizer Chiefs (13)	–
2007	Mamelodi Sundowns (8)	Ajax Cape Town (2)	Kaizer Chiefs (11)	Mamelodi Sundowns (3)	–
		Nedbank Cup		MTN 8	
2008	SuperSport United (1)	Mamelodi Sundowns (3)	Ajax Cape Town (2)	Kaizer Chiefs (14)	–
2009	SuperSport United (2)	Moroka Swallows (5)	Kaizer Chiefs (12)	Golden Arrows (1)	–
2010	SuperSport United (3)	Bidvest Wits (2)	Kaizer Chiefs (13)	Orlando Pirates (8)	–
2011	Orlando Pirates (8)	Orlando Pirates (7)	Orlando Pirates (1)	Orlando Pirates (9)	–
2012	Orlando Pirates (9)	SuperSport United (3)	Bloemfontein Celtic (1)	Moroka Swallows (3)	–
2013	Kaizer Chiefs (11)	Kaizer Chiefs (13)	Platinum Stars (2)	Platinum Stars (1)	–
2014	Mamelodi Sundowns (9)	Orlando Pirates (8)	SuperSport United (1)	Kaizer Chiefs (15)	–
2015	Kaizer Chiefs (12)	Mamelodi Sundowns (4)	Mamelodi Sundowns (3)	Ajax Cape Town (1)	–
2016	Mamelodi Sundowns (10)	SuperSport United (4)	Cape Town City (1)	Bidvest Wits(3)	CL: Mamelodi Sundowns (1)
2017	Bidvest Wits (1)	SuperSport United (5)	Bidvest Wits (3)	SuperSport United (2)	SC: Mamelodi Sundowns (1)
2018	Mamelodi Sundowns (11)	Free State Stars (1)	Baroka (1)	Cape Town City (1)	–
2019	Mamelodi Sundowns (12)	TS Galaxy (1)	Mamelodi Sundowns (4)	SuperSport United (3)	–
2020	Mamelodi Sundowns (13)	Mamelodi Sundowns (5)	–	Orlando Pirates(10)	–
2021	Mamelodi Sundowns (14)	Tshakhuma (1)	–	Mamelodi Sundowns (4)	–
2022	Mamelodi Sundowns (15)	Mamelodi Sundowns (6)	–	Orlando Pirates (11)	–
			Carling Knockout Cup		
2023	Mamelodi Sundowns (16)	Orlando Pirates (9)	Stellenbosch (1)	Orlando Pirates (12)	AFL: Mamelodi Sundowns (1)
2024	Mamelodi Sundowns (17)	Orlando Pirates (10)	Magesi (1)	Orlando Pirates (13)	–
2025	Mamelodi Sundowns (18)	Kaizer Chiefs (14)	Orlando Pirates (2)	Orlando Pirates (14)	–
2026	Orlando Pirates (10)	Durban City (2024) (1)			CL: Mamelodi Sundowns (2)

=== Overall totals ===
As of May 24, 2026

Defunct teams: †.

Team	League	Cup	League Cup	Top 8	Champions League	African Football League	Cup Winners' Cup	Super Cup	Total	Last
Kaizer Chiefs	12	14	13	15	–	–	1	–	55	2025 C
Orlando Pirates	10	10	2	14	1	–	–	1	38	2026 L
Mamelodi Sundowns	18	6	4	4	2	1	–	1	36	2026 CL
SuperSport United †	3	5	1	3	–	–	–	–	12	2019 OC
Bidvest Wits †	1	2	3	3	–	–	–	–	9	2017 LC
Moroka Swallows	–	5	–	3	–	–	–	–	8	2012 OC
Cape Town Spurs	1	2	2	1	–	–	–	–	6	2015 OC
Jomo Cosmos	1	1	2	1	–	–	–	–	5	2005 LC
Santos	1	2	–	1	–	–	–	–	4	2003 C
Bloemfontein Celtic	–	1	1	1	–	–	–	–	3	2012 LC
Platinum Stars †	–	–	2	1	–	–	–	–	3	2013 LC
Durban City (1959) †	2	–	–	–	–	–	–	–	2	1983 L
AmaZulu	1	–	1	–	–	–	–	–	2	1992 LC
Durban Bush Bucks †	1	–	1	–	–	–	–	–	2	1987 LC
Free State Stars †	–	1	1	–	–	–	–	–	2	2018 C
Mpumalanga Black Aces †	–	1	–	1	–	–	–	–	2	1993 C
Bush Bucks	–	–	2	–	–	–	–	–	2	1996 LC
Cape Town City	–	–	1	1	–	–	–	–	2	2018 OC
Arcadia Shepherds	–	–	1	1	–	–	–	–	2	1986 OC
Manning Rangers †	1	–	–	–	–	–	–	–	1	1997 L
Rangers †	1	–	–	–	–	–	–	–	1	1986 L
Highlands Park †	1	–	–	–	–	–	–	–	1	1980 L
Lusitano	1	–	–	–	–	–	–	–	1	1978 L
Durban City (2024)	–	1	–	–	–	–	–	–	1	2026 C
Tshakhuma Tsha Madzivhandila	–	1	–	–	–	–	–	–	1	2021 C
TS Galaxy	–	1	–	–	–	–	–	–	1	2019 C
Vaal Professionals †	–	1	–	–	–	–	–	–	1	1994 C
Magesi	–	–	1	–	–	–	–	–	1	2024 LC
Stellenbosch	–	–	1	–	–	–	–	–	1	2023 LC
Baroka	–	–	1	–	–	–	–	–	1	2018 LC
Dynamos †	–	–	1	–	–	–	–	–	1	1991 LC
Lamontville Golden Arrows	–	–	–	1	–	–	–	–	1	2009 OC

== Top goalscorers ==
=== All-time top goalscorers ===
- 130 goals: Peter Shalulile
- 129 goals: Siyabonga Nomvete
- 124 goals: Bradley Grobler
- 110 goals: Daniel Mudau
- 104 goals: Manuel Bucuane
- 104 goals: Mabhuti Khenyeza
- 101 goals: Siphiwe Tshabalala
- 101 goals: Collins Mbesuma

NB: list includes all players who have scored at least 100 goals in the PSL era. Also includes cup competitions.

== Founding members ==
Bold entries are participating in the current season.

- AmaZulu
- Bloemfontein Celtic
- Cape Town Spurs
- Hellenic
- Jomo Cosmos
- Kaizer Chiefs
- Manning Rangers
- Michau Warriors
- Moroka Swallows
- Orlando Pirates
- QwaQwa Stars
- Real Rovers
- Mamelodi Sundowns
- SuperSport United
- Bush Bucks
- Vaal Professionals
- Witbank Aces
- Wits University

== See also ==
- Association football records in South Africa
- List of South African association football families
- List of association footballers who died while playing
- List of foreign football players in South Africa
- List of one-club men in association football
- Vodacom League
- Soccer records and statistics in South Africa
