= 1981 NPSL First Division =

National Professional Soccer League
- Season: 1981
- Champions: Kaizer Chiefs
- Relegated: Lusitano, Pilkington United Bros, Stilfontein Big XI

The 1981 National Professional Soccer League was the fourth season of the multi-racial South African National Professional Soccer League (NPSL). The league was a merger of the previous NPSL, which due to the country's apartheid policies were for black teams only, and the National Football League, for white teams only.

The other professional league, the non-racial Federation Professional League, continued to function independently.

It was won by Kaizer Chiefs, who finished a point ahead of defending champions Highlands Park. Chiefs also won the Mainstay Cup, the BP Top 8 and the Sales House Champion of Champions. The 1981 Chiefs side is regarded as one of the best in the country's history.

Pos	Team	Pld	W	D	L	GF	GA	GD	Pts
1	Kaizer Chiefs	34	23	8	3	64	22	+42	54
2	Highlands Park	34	21	11	2	63	16	+47	53
3	Arcadia Shepherds	34	20	9	5	76	40	+36	49
4	Hellenic	34	19	8	7	73	34	+39	46
5	Wits University	34	16	12	6	56	34	+22	44
6	Witbank Black Aces	34	14	10	10	53	34	+19	38
7	Orlando Pirates	34	13	12	9	45	39	+6	38
8	Moroka Swallows	34	13	12	9	59	51	+8	38
9	Durban City	34	12	9	13	60	60	0	33
10	Benoni United	34	11	9	14	48	48	0	31
11	Dynamos	34	9	12	13	48	45	+3	30
12	Mamelodi United	34	10	10	14	32	37	−5	30
13	African Wanderers	34	8	11	15	34	53	−19	27
14	Leicester City	34	7	11	16	39	55	−16	25
15	AmaZulu	34	8	7	19	29	43	−14	23
16	Lusitano (R)	34	5	10	19	39	82	−43	20
17	Pilkington United Bros (R)	34	5	10	19	33	71	−38	20
18	Stilfontein Big XI (R)	34	2	8	24	34	106	−72	12

Source: https://www.rsssf.org/tablesz/zaf81.html
(R) Relegated
