= 1984 NPSL First Division =

National Professional Soccer League
- Season: 1984
- Champions: Kaizer Chiefs
- Relegated: Stallions/Dynamos, Western Tigers

The 1984 National Professional Soccer League was the seventh and final season of the multi-racial South African National Professional Soccer League (NPSL) before most of its top clubs formed the National Soccer League (NSL), with a small rump continuing under the NPSL brand. The NPSL had been a merger of the previous NPSL, which due to the country's apartheid policies were for black teams only, and the National Football League, for white teams only.

The other professional league, the non-racial Federation Professional League, continued to function independently.

It was won by Kaizer Chiefs on goal difference. Chiefs, Moroka Swallows and 1983 champions Durban City all finished on 43 points, with Arcadia and Hellenic both a single point behind.

== Changes ==
Frasiers Celtic (previously Bloemfontein Celtic), AmaZulu and Western Tigers were all promoted, with African Wanderers, Mamelodi United, Welkom Real Hearts and Ireland United all relegated. Jomo Sono's, Dion Cosmos were renamed Jomo Cosmos.

With three clubs promoted, and four relegated, the size of the league was reduced back to 18 teams.

== League table ==
| Pos | Team | Pld | W | D | L | GF | GA | GD | Pts |
|---|---|---|---|---|---|---|---|---|---|
| 1 | Kaizer Chiefs | 34 | 17 | 9 | 8 | 58 | 33 | +25 | 43 |
| 2 | Moroka Swallows | 34 | 15 | 13 | 6 | 51 | 32 | +19 | 43 |
| 3 | Durban City | 34 | 15 | 13 | 6 | 56 | 38 | +18 | 43 |
| 4 | Arcadia Shepherds | 34 | 19 | 4 | 11 | 54 | 35 | +19 | 42 |
| 5 | Hellenic | 34 | 18 | 6 | 10 | 46 | 41 | +5 | 42 |
| 6 | Wits University | 34 | 15 | 10 | 9 | 56 | 33 | +23 | 40 |
| 7 | Ukhamba Black Aces | 34 | 14 | 12 | 8 | 48 | 32 | +16 | 40 |
| 8 | Frasiers Celtic | 34 | 16 | 6 | 12 | 51 | 46 | +5 | 38 |
| 9 | Jomo Cosmos | 34 | 15 | 8 | 11 | 52 | 47 | +5 | 38 |
| 10 | Durban Bush Bucks | 34 | 14 | 6 | 14 | 65 | 60 | +5 | 34 |
| 11 | Rangers | 34 | 11 | 11 | 12 | 49 | 48 | +1 | 33 |
| 12 | Cape Town Spurs | 34 | 12 | 8 | 14 | 38 | 56 | −18 | 32 |
| 13 | Orlando Pirates | 34 | 13 | 5 | 16 | 44 | 43 | +1 | 31 |
| 14 | Mamelodi Sundowns | 34 | 10 | 8 | 16 | 31 | 39 | −8 | 28 |
| 15 | AmaZulu | 34 | 9 | 9 | 16 | 30 | 48 | −18 | 27 |
| 16 | Kwikot Benoni | 34 | 8 | 5 | 21 | 24 | 49 | −25 | 21 |
| 17 | Western Tigers (R) | 34 | 6 | 8 | 20 | 36 | 64 | −28 | 20 |
| 18 | Stallions/Dynamos (R) | 34 | 5 | 7 | 22 | 37 | 81 | −44 | 17 |

Source: https://www.rsssf.org/tablesz/zaf84.html
(R) Relegated
