= 1976 NPSL First Division =

National Professional Soccer League
- Season: 1976
- Champions: Orlando Pirates

The 1976 National Professional Soccer League was the sixth season of the National Professional Soccer League, a South African soccer league. It was won by Orlando Pirates.

At the time, due to the country's apartheid policies, the competition was only open to black South African teams, and it ran in parallel with the FPL and the NFL.

Pos	Team	Pld	W	D	L	GF	GA	GD	Pts
1	Orlando Pirates (C)	30	21	5	4	79	21	+58	47
2	Kaizer Chiefs	30	19	6	5	75	24	+51	44
3	Moroka Swallows Ltd	30	19	5	6	71	24	+47	43
4	Vaal Professionals	30	14	12	4	62	42	+20	40
5	AmaZulu	30	14	8	8	49	28	+21	36
6	Welkom Real Hearts	30	13	9	8	49	46	+3	35
7	African Wanderers	30	12	9	9	47	43	+4	33
8	Pretoria Callies	30	13	6	11	63	55	+8	32
9	Benoni United	30	10	11	9	62	46	+16	31
10	Witbank Black Aces	30	9	10	11	60	55	+5	28
11	Leeds United	30	8	6	16	40	54	−14	28
12	Lamontville Golden Arrows	30	11	4	15	40	54	−14	26
13	Moroka Swallows	30	7	10	13	43	70	−27	24
14	Bloemfontein Celtic	30	7	5	18	36	66	−30	19
15	Welkom Hungry Lions	30	6	1	23	39	88	−49	13
16	Umlazi Citizens Ltd	30	3	3	24	44	128	−84	9

Source: https://www.rsssf.org/tablesz/zaf76.html
(C) Champions
