= 1979 NPSL First Division =

National Professional Soccer League
- Season: 1979
- Champions: Kaizer Chiefs

The 1979 National Professional Soccer League was the second season of the multi-racial South African National Professional Soccer League (NPSL). The league was a merger of the previous NPSL, which due to the country's apartheid policies were for black teams only, and the National Football League, for white teams only. It was won by Kaizer Chiefs.

The year saw Keith Broad joining Orlando Pirates to become the first white player to play for a black team.

The third professional league, the non-racial Federation Professional League, continued to function independently.

Pos	Team	Pld	W	D	L	GF	GA	GD	Pts
1	Kaizer Chiefs	34	23	8	3	58	21	+37	54
2	Arcadia Shepherds	34	23	6	5	72	29	+43	52
3	Highlands Park	34	21	9	4	64	26	+38	51
4	Hellenic	34	20	9	5	53	20	+33	49
5	Dynamos	34	19	8	7	62	33	+29	46
6	Durban City	34	20	5	9	58	40	+18	45
7	Cape Town City	34	17	7	10	58	38	+20	41
8	Witbank Black Aces	34	14	8	12	59	48	+11	36
9	Orlando Pirates	34	14	6	14	48	42	+6	34
10	Moroka Swallows	34	12	5	17	49	43	+6	29
11	Pretoria Callies	34	10	9	15	36	49	−13	29
12	AmaZulu	34	11	7	16	43	51	−8	29
13	Wits University	34	10	8	16	36	40	−4	28
14	Lusitano	34	9	7	18	36	55	−19	25
15	Benoni United	34	6	9	19	33	60	−27	21
16	Welkom Real Hearts	34	6	7	21	30	60	−30	19
17	Vaal Professionals (R)	34	5	5	24	21	70	−49	15
18	African Wanderers (R)	34	2	2	30	13	97	−84	6

Source: https://www.rsssf.org/tablesz/zaf79.html
(R) Relegated
