= 1983 NPSL First Division =

National Professional Soccer League
- Season: 1983
- Champions: Durban City
- Relegated: African Wanderers, Mamelodi United, Welkom Real Hearts, Ireland United

The 1983 National Professional Soccer League was the sixth season of the multi-racial South African National Professional Soccer League (NPSL). The league was a merger of the previous NPSL, which due to the country's apartheid policies were for black teams only, and the National Football League, for white teams only.

The other professional league, the non-racial Federation Professional League, continued to function independently.

It was won by Durban City, managed by Clive Barker, who defended their title won in 1982.

== Changes ==
Jomo Sono, after ending his playing career in the United States, purchased Highlands Park, naming the new club Dion Cosmos.

Cape Town Spurs, Mamelodi Sundowns, Welkom Real Hearts and Ireland United were promoted.

AmaZulu, Bloemfontein Celtic, Leicester City were relegated from the 1982 NPSL First Division.

With four clubs promoted, and three relegated, the size of the league expanded to 19 teams.

== League table ==
Pos	Team	Pld	W	D	L	GF	GA	GD	Pts
1	Durban City	34	23	4	7	70	35	+35	50
2	Arcadia Shepherds	35	19	7	9	68	43	+25	45
3	Kaizer Chiefs	33	18	7	8	43	25	+18	43
4	Wits University	36	16	10	10	46	38	+8	42
5	Moroka Swallows	34	15	10	9	44	32	+12	40
6	Hellenic	33	16	7	10	40	27	+13	39
7	Cape Town Spurs	34	12	14	8	48	38	+10	38
8	Orlando Pirates	33	16	5	12	47	39	+8	37
9	Dion Cosmos	35	13	11	11	54	46	+8	37
10	Witbank Black Aces	35	11	14	10	43	43	0	36
11	Rangers	35	13	7	15	41	40	+1	33
12	Durban Bush Bucks	34	13	7	14	48	53	−5	33
13	Benoni United	35	11	9	15	34	43	−9	31
14	Dynamos	45	12	16	17	40	49	−9	40
15	Mamelodi Sundowns	35	9	10	16	35	47	−12	28
16	African Wanderers (R)	34	10	6	18	42	61	−19	26
17	Mamelodi United (R)	36	6	13	17	27	52	−25	25
18	Welkom Real Hearts (R)	35	7	10	18	38	56	−18	24
19	Ireland United (R)	35	4	11	20	22	63	−41	19

Source: https://www.rsssf.org/tablesz/zaf83.html
(R) Relegated
