= 1980 NPSL First Division =

National Professional Soccer League
- Season: 1980
- Champions: Highlands Park
- Relegated: Pretoria Callies, Welkom Real Hearts, Bloemfontein Celtic

The 1980 National Professional Soccer League was the third season of the multi-racial South African National Professional Soccer League (NPSL). The league was a merger of the previous NPSL, which due to the country's apartheid policies were for black teams only, and the National Football League, for white teams only. It was won by Highlands Park.

The third professional league, the non-racial Federation Professional League, continued to function independently.

| Pos | Team | Pld | W | D | L | GF | GA | GD | Pts |
|---|---|---|---|---|---|---|---|---|---|
| 1 | Highlands Park | 34 | 23 | 8 | 3 | 46 | 17 | +29 | 54 |
| 2 | Kaizer Chiefs | 34 | 20 | 9 | 5 | 52 | 30 | +22 | 49 |
| 3 | Wits University | 34 | 19 | 10 | 5 | 67 | 31 | +36 | 48 |
| 4 | Orlando Pirates | 34 | 19 | 8 | 7 | 56 | 33 | +23 | 46 |
| 5 | Arcadia Shepherds | 34 | 16 | 9 | 9 | 69 | 40 | +29 | 41 |
| 6 | Dynamos | 34 | 16 | 6 | 12 | 57 | 44 | +13 | 38 |
| 7 | Hellenic | 34 | 14 | 10 | 10 | 49 | 40 | +9 | 38 |
| 8 | Moroka Swallows | 34 | 12 | 10 | 12 | 48 | 50 | −2 | 34 |
| 9 | Witbank Black Aces | 34 | 13 | 7 | 14 | 61 | 60 | +1 | 33 |
| 10 | Durban City | 34 | 12 | 8 | 14 | 52 | 48 | +4 | 32 |
| 11 | Lusitano | 34 | 11 | 9 | 14 | 42 | 53 | −11 | 31 |
| 12 | AmaZulu | 34 | 9 | 12 | 13 | 29 | 43 | −14 | 30 |
| 13 | Benoni United | 34 | 10 | 8 | 16 | 37 | 46 | −9 | 28 |
| 14 | Leicester City | 34 | 9 | 9 | 16 | 40 | 44 | −4 | 27 |
| 15 | Pilkington United Bros | 34 | 10 | 5 | 19 | 41 | 63 | −22 | 25 |
| 16 | Pretoria Callies (R) | 34 | 8 | 8 | 18 | 23 | 44 | −21 | 24 |
| 17 | Welkom Real Hearts (R) | 34 | 5 | 10 | 19 | 24 | 54 | −30 | 20 |
| 18 | Bloemfontein Celtic (R) | 34 | 4 | 6 | 24 | 33 | 91 | −58 | 14 |

Source: https://www.rsssf.org/tablesz/zaf80.html
(R) Relegated
