= 1999–2000 South African Premiership =

Premiership
- Season: 1999–2000
- Champions: Mamelodi Sundowns; 3rd PSL title 6th South African title
- Relegated: Mother City; AmaZulu
- CAF Champions League: Mamelodi Sundowns
- African Cup Winners' Cup: Kaizer Chiefs
- CAF Cup: Ajax Cape Town
- Matches: 306
- Goals: 823 (2.69 per match)
- Top goalscorer: Daniel Mudau; Mamelodi Sundowns (15 goals)
- Biggest home win: Hellenic 6–0 Tembisa Classic (14 August 1999); Orlando Pirates 6–0 Free State Stars (12 April 2000); Bloemfontein Celtic 6–0 Mother City (10 May 2000)
- Biggest away win: Santos 0–5 Hellenic (8 December 1999); AmaZulu 2–7 SuperSport United (9 April 2000)
- Highest scoring: Tembisa Classic 5–4 Hellenic (18 December 1999); AmaZulu 2–7 SuperSport United (9 April 2000) (9 goals)

The 1999–2000 South African Premiership, known as the 1999–2000 Castle Premiership for sponsorship purposes, and also commonly referred to as the PSL after the governing body, was the fourth season of the Premiership since its establishment in 1996. The season began on 30 July 1999 and ended on 4 June 2000. Mamelodi Sundowns once again managed to secure their crown, sealing their third successive PSL title. Along with their success in the PSL's predecessor - winning three National Soccer League titles in 1988, 1990 and 1993 - this gave Mamelodi Sundowns their 6th South African championship. Sundowns tallied 75 points for the season, equalling the points record they jointly set with Kaizer Chiefs last season, but unlike the previous season in which the title was decided by goal difference, there was no close title race this season as Sundowns finished comfortably ahead of second placed Orlando Pirates with an 11-point margin.

As before, the league was contested by 18 teams, sixteen returning from the 1997–98 season and two newly promoted clubs; the returning African Wanderers and Tembisa Classic. The league continued to run parallel to the European football calendar (August–May) and not run concurrently with the African football calendar (January–December).

== Club mergers and name changes ==
At the conclusion of the 1998-99 PSL season Cape Town clubs Cape Town Spurs and Seven Stars merged, and in conjunction with Dutch giants Ajax Amsterdam, named the new club Ajax Cape Town F.C. The merger came about after Seven Stars' Chairman and owner Rob Moore had travelled to the Netherlands to conclude the transfer of star striker Benni McCarthy. At the transfer meeting the Ajax Amsterdam board mentioned to Moore that they would like to set up a Football Development Academy in South Africa. With this in mind, Moore developed a blueprint for the creation of a new football club that would best be able to harness the talents of young South African footballers and operate as a feeder club to Ajax Amsterdam. Moore submitted his proposal to the Ajax Amsterdam board and they accepted it, entrusting Moore with the task of returning to South Africa and implementing his idea. Once back home Moore contacted Cape Town Spurs' Chairman John Comitis and invited him to join this new venture. The two Chairman agreed and so, in October 1998, Ajax Cape Town was created from the merger of the two clubs and with the technical input of Ajax Amsterdam. The new club adopted the famous kit and badge - with a slight modification, replacing the word Amsterdam with Cape Town - of their European parent club.

The merger between Ajax Cape Town and Free State Stars left the PSL with 17 teams, one short of the 18 it required. In order to fill the vacant spot a second team was created out of the Cape Town Spurs-Seven Stars merger; Mother City F.C. However, unlike the planning and resources that went into establishing Ajax Cape Town, Mother City came into existence in a far more rushed manner with nowhere near the resources or technical input of Ajax Cape Town. The result was a club that set as yet unbroken records for fewest wins, most goals conceded and fewest points in a league season. The club was relegated with ease and would cease to exist a mere 3 years after its establishment.

Free State club Qwa Qwa Stars changed their name to Free State Stars F.C. in order to broaden their appeal.

== Season summary ==
Mamelodi Sundowns clinched a record third successive Premiership title when they romped home in first place at the end of the 1999–2000 season. After a nail-biting finish to the 1998-99 season that saw Sundowns and Kaizer Chiefs finish level on points, Sundowns had a much easier time securing the title this time around, finishing comfortably ahead of second placed Orlando Pirates. Chiefs, who had finished runners-up for the past three seasons, fell back to third place as they found themselves unable to replicate their performance from the 1998–99 season.

The newly created Ajax Cape Town had a strong season, finishing in fourth place on 53 points, with inaugural PSL champions Manning Rangers just behind them in fifth. Wits University, Jomo Cosmos and Hellenic rounded out the top eight. Newly promoted Tembisa Classic had a strong debut season, finishing in a respectable 9th place.

Popular KwaZulu Natal club AmaZulu and the newly formed Mother City found themselves at the wrong end of the table. After years of just avoiding the drop by finishing 14th, 15th & 14th over the course of the past three seasons, AmaZulu's luck finally ran out as they were relegated. Heading into the final day of the season AmaZulu found themselves level on points with African Wanderers - who had only just returned to the PSL following their relegation at the end of the 1997-98 season - with only goal difference separating them; AmaZulu's goal difference of -11 keeping them above African Wanderers who had a goal difference of -13. All AmaZulu had to do was equal or better African Wanderers' result on the final day of the season. For their final fixtures neither team had it easy as AmaZulu had to travel to face Ajax Cape Town while Wanderers had to host runners-up Orlando Pirates. In a thrilling result African Wanderers managed to put four goals past Pirates in a magnificent 4–3 win while AmaZulu suffered an agonising 2–1 defeat, putting both teams level on goal difference but moving Wanderers onto 39 points, three ahead of AmaZulu and into safety.

Mother City however never looked like they would survive. By season's end they had set PSL records for the fewest wins (2), most defeats (28), most goals conceded (85), worst goal difference (-63) and fewest points (10). Mother City conceded 4-goals or more on 6 occasions and twice conceded 6. Following their relegation the club would not return to the PSL and would only last for two more seasons in the National First Division before shutting down.

The 1999–2000 season was characterised by prolific goalscoring, with an average of 2.69 goals per match. Of particular interest were the games between Classic and Hellenic which featured a startling 15 goals. Classic had suffered a 6-0 drubbing at the hands of Hellenic on 14 August 1999 but returned home and defeated Hellenic in a thrilling 9-goal affair, running out 5-4 winners. Other high scoring games included SuperSport United's 7–2 rout of AmaZulu in Mthatha and the pulsating 4–4 draw in Bloemfontein between Bloemfontein Celtic and Manning Rangers.

== Final table ==
Pos	Team	Pld	W	D	L	GF	GA	GD	Pts	Qualification or relegation
1	Mamelodi Sundowns (C)	34	23	6	5	68	34	+34	75	2001 CAF Champions League First Round (Note: Due to the PSL following a different football calendar to the rest of Africa, which runs over a single calendar year and not the international August–May calendar followed by the PSL, Mamelodi Sundowns, Kaizer Chiefs & Ajax Cape Town were only eligible to enter the 2001 editions of the respective CAF competitions they qualified for.)
2	Orlando Pirates	34	18	10	6	72	36	+36	64	Withdrew from participating in the 2001 CAF Cup (Note: Orlando Pirates, who had qualified for the 2001 CAF Cup, withdrew from the competition. As the cup was intended for league runners-up their place in the tournament was then extended to Kaizer Chiefs who had finished third, but they declined as they had already qualified for the more prestigious 2001 African Cup Winners' Cup. Pirates' place in the tournament was then extended to and taken by Ajax Cape Town.)
3	Kaizer Chiefs	34	16	12	6	40	22	+18	60	2001 African Cup Winners' Cup First Round
4	Ajax Cape Town	34	15	8	11	43	39	+4	53	2001 CAF Cup First Round
5	Manning Rangers	34	14	10	10	54	49	+5	52	
6	Wits University	34	12	15	7	36	29	+7	51	
7	Jomo Cosmos	34	12	14	8	49	32	+17	50	
8	Hellenic	34	13	8	13	62	45	+17	47	
9	Tembisa Classic	34	13	5	16	48	57	−9	44	
10	SuperSport United	34	11	10	13	51	48	+3	43	
11	Santos	34	9	16	9	44	64	−20	43	
12	Moroka Swallows	34	11	9	14	39	52	−13	42	
13	Bush Bucks	34	10	11	13	48	48	0	41	
14	Bloemfontein Celtic	34	10	10	14	46	56	−10	40	
15	Free State Stars	34	9	13	12	29	38	−9	40	
16	African Wanderers	34	11	6	17	38	50	−12	39	
17	AmaZulu (R)	34	9	9	16	32	44	−12	36	Relegated to the National First Division
18	Mother City F.C. (R)	34	2	4	28	22	85	−63	10	Relegated to the National First Division

(C) Champions; (R) Relegated
