= 1987 NPSL First Division =

National Premier Soccer League
- Season: 1987
- Champions: Vaal Professionals

The 1987 National Professional Soccer League was the 1987 season of the National Professional Soccer League. It was won by Vaal Professionals.

Pos	Team	Pld	W	D	L	GF	GA	GD	Pts
1	Vaal Professionals (Sharpeville) (C)	34	31	2	1	139	19	+120	64
2	Orlando Pirates (Soweto)	34	29	3	2	133	38	+95	61
3	Continentals (Witbank)	34	22	5	7	73	49	+24	49
4	Adriatica (Johannesburg)	34	20	5	9	77	56	+21	45
5	Bloemfontein Young Tigers (Bloemfontein)	34	20	5	9	58	41	+17	45
6	AmaZulu (Durban)	34	19	5	10	63	27	+36	43
7	Ace Mates (Soweto)	34	13	9	12	43	57	−14	35
8	Midway Toyota (Thokoza)	34	14	4	16	64	76	−12	32
9	Waleng Big XV (Thokoza)	34	14	3	17	57	66	−9	31
10	Zamdela United (Sasolburg)	34	12	7	15	55	85	−30	31
11	Lincoln City (Soweto)	34	12	3	19	46	72	−26	27
12	Pretoria Home Celtics (Mamelodi).	34	11	7	16	49	78	−29	29
13	Delmas Young Stars (Delmas)	34	12	4	18	58	77	−19	28
14	Mighty Birds (Soweto)	34	8	8	18	45	78	−33	24
15	Juventus (Daveyton) (Note: Juventus were removed from the league for failing to fulfil fixtures.)	34	11	1	22	52	57	−5	23
16	Newcastle United (Newcastle)	34	7	7	20	34	48	−14	21
17	Mondlo United Brothers (Emondio) (Note: Mondlo United Brothers were removed from the league for failing to fulfil fixtures.)	34	9	3	22	50	70	−20	21
18	Pimville United Brothers (Soweto)	34	4	1	29	34	80	−46	9

(C) Champions
