= 1982 NPSL First Division =

National Professional Soccer League
- Season: 1982
- Champions: Durban City
- Relegated: AmaZulu, Bloemfontein Celtic, Leicester City

The 1982 National Professional Soccer League was the fifth season of the multi-racial South African National Professional Soccer League (NPSL). The league was a merger of the previous NPSL, which due to the country's apartheid policies were for black teams only, and the National Football League, for white teams only.

The other professional league, the non-racial Federation Professional League, continued to function independently.

It was won by Durban City, managed by Clive Barker, earning City their first ever title.

Pos	Team	Pld	W	D	L	GF	GA	GD	Pts
1	Durban City	34	20	9	5	58	25	+33	49
2	Wits University	34	19	10	5	57	25	+32	48
3	Kaizer Chiefs	34	18	7	9	52	32	+20	43
4	Highlands Park	34	15	12	7	49	27	+22	42
5	Orlando Pirates	34	17	8	9	46	36	+10	42
6	Hellenic	34	14	12	8	50	31	+19	40
7	Arcadia Shepherds	34	15	9	10	51	33	+18	39
8	Dynamos	34	16	7	11	51	43	+8	39
9	Moroka Swallows	34	13	13	8	59	51	+8	39
10	Witbank Black Aces	34	13	10	11	46	45	+1	36
11	African Wanderers	34	10	10	14	36	50	−14	30
12	Mamelodi United	34	10	10	14	38	61	−23	30
13	Benoni United	34	9	11	14	35	49	−14	29
14	Rangers	34	10	7	17	38	45	−7	27
15	Durban Bush Bucks	34	9	8	17	43	59	−16	26
16	AmaZulu (R)	34	11	4	19	35	51	−16	26
17	Bloemfontein Celtic (R)	34	4	7	23	25	62	−37	15
18	Leicester City (R)	34	4	4	26	27	73	−46	12

Source: https://www.rsssf.org/tablesz/zaf82.html
(R) Relegated
