= 1999–2000 National First Division =

South African soccer season

National First Division
- Season: 1999–2000
- Champions: Ria Stars (Inland); Golden Arrows (Coastal)
- Promoted: Ria Stars, Golden Arrows

The 1999–2000 National First Division was the 4th season of the second tier of South African soccer since the reorganisation in 1996.

It consisted of two streams, an Inland stream of 16 teams, and a Coastal stream of 14 teams.

The Coastal stream was won by Golden Arrows, the third consecutive team from Durban to do so, and the Inland stream by Ria Stars, with both earning promotion to the 2000–01 Premier Soccer League.

Two high-profile clubs were relegated, with Durban Bush Bucks, winners of the inaugural 1985 NSL First Division, finishing bottom of the Coastal Stream, and Vaal Professionals, members of the inaugural 1971 Castle League, finishing bottom of the Inland Stream.

== Coastal stream ==
=== League table ===
Pos	Team	Pld	W	D	L	GF	GA	GD	Pts	Promotion, qualification or relegation
1	Golden Arrows (C, P)	26	19	4	3	56	14	+42	61	Promoted to 2000–01 Premier Soccer League
2	Avendale Athletico	26	18	4	4	39	15	+24	58	
3	FC Fortune	26	13	6	7	48	36	+12	45	
4	Park United	26	11	5	10	33	30	+3	38	
5	Cape Town City	26	11	4	11	37	33	+4	37	
6	Saxon Rovers	26	11	3	12	46	46	0	36	
7	Premier United	26	10	6	10	41	47	−6	36	
8	Phoenix City	26	10	4	12	35	33	+2	34	
9	Newtons	26	10	4	12	24	29	−5	34	
10	Durban United	26	8	10	8	31	37	−6	34	
11	Royal Tigers	26	8	8	10	37	40	−3	32	
12	Trinitarians (R)	26	9	5	12	32	36	−4	32	Relegation to 2000–01 SAFA Second Division
13	Blackburn Rovers (R)	26	6	4	16	30	52	−22	22	Relegation to 2000–01 SAFA Second Division
14	Durban Bush Bucks (R)	26	2	5	19	18	59	−41	11	Relegation to 2000–01 SAFA Second Division

(C) Champions; (P) Promoted; (R) Relegated

== Inland stream ==
=== League table ===
Pos	Team	Pld	W	D	L	GF	GA	GD	Pts	Promotion, qualification or relegation
1	Ria Stars (C, P)	30	22	4	4	52	25	+27	70	Promoted to 2000–01 Premier Soccer League
2	Dynamos	30	20	6	4	64	25	+39	66	
3	Young Masters	30	18	3	9	50	30	+20	57	
4	Young Tigers	30	15	9	6	50	32	+18	54	
5	City Sharks	30	14	10	6	45	34	+11	52	
6	Black Leopards	30	14	7	9	43	29	+14	49	
7	All Nations	30	11	12	7	44	28	+16	45	
8	Arcadia Shepherds	30	10	9	11	31	37	−6	39	
9	Silver Stars	30	8	11	11	45	50	−5	35	
10	Unisaints	30	8	10	12	37	42	−5	34	
11	Sporting	30	7	12	11	39	47	−8	33	
12	Witbank Aces	30	8	9	13	42	51	−9	33	
13	Spartak	30	6	10	14	24	40	−16	28	
14	Giant Aces	30	6	9	15	40	51	−11	27	
15	Real Rovers	30	4	8	18	25	64	−39	20	
16	Vaal Professionals (R)	30	4	1	25	18	64	−46	13	Relegation to 2000–01 SAFA Second Division

(C) Champions; (P) Promoted; (R) Relegated
