= 1974 NPSL First Division =

National Premier Soccer League
- Season: 1974
- Champions: Kaizer Chiefs
- Matches played: 240
- Goals scored: 863 (3.6 per match)

The 1974 National Professional Soccer League season was the fourth season of the National Professional Soccer League, a South African soccer league. It was won by Kaizer Chiefs.

At the time, due to the country's apartheid policies, the competition was only open to black South African teams, and it ran in parallel with the FPL and the NFL

== Table ==
Pos	Team	Pld	W	D	L	GF	GA	GD	Pts
1	Kaizer Chiefs (C)	30	23	4	3	106	27	+79	50
2	Moroka Swallows Ltd.	30	19	3	8	74	43	+31	41
3	Zulu Royals	30	16	9	5	61	38	+23	41
4	Pretoria Bantu Callies	30	15	9	6	66	45	+21	39
5	Orlando Pirates	30	15	7	8	55	41	+14	37
6	Witbank Black Aces	30	15	6	9	58	43	+15	36
7	Pimville United Brothers	30	12	11	7	67	51	+16	35
8	Welkom Real Hearts	30	12	7	11	66	48	+18	31
9	Vaal Professional	30	10	9	11	53	55	−2	29
10	Benoni United	30	10	8	12	70	63	+7	28
11	Lamontville Golden Arrows	30	9	8	13	45	65	−20	26
12	Mangaung United	30	6	10	14	58	78	−20	22
13	African Wanderers	30	7	6	17	58	77	−19	20
14	Moroka Swallows	30	9	1	20	38	77	−39	19
15	Real Katlehong City	30	4	9	17	27	59	−32	17
16	Durban City All Blacks (Note: Five players were killed and seven seriously injured in a traffic collision while returning from a game in Benoni on 11 April 1974. The club disbanded following the season.)	30	3	4	23	24	94	−70	10

(C) Champions
