= NPSL =

NPSL may refer to:

- National Premier Soccer League, an American semi-professional soccer league established in 2003
- National Professional Soccer League (1967), an American outdoor soccer league active in 1967
- National Professional Soccer League (1984–2001), an American indoor soccer league active from 1984 to 2001
- National Professional Soccer League (South Africa), a South African soccer league active from 1971 to 1995
