= Simon Lehoko =

South African soccer player (1951–2025)

Personal information
- Date of birth: 1951
- Place of birth: Vereeniging, South Africa
- Date of death: 17 April 2025 (aged 74)
- Position: Defender

Youth career
- 1967–1971: Real X20

Senior career*
Years	Team	Apps	(Gls)
1971–1978	Vaal Professionals	214	(11)
1978–1985	Kaizer Chiefs	238	(25)
Total		454	(36)

International career
1977	South Africa		
- * Club domestic league appearances and goals

Simon Lehoko (1951 – 17 April 2025) was a South African soccer player who played as a defender for Kaizer Chiefs and Vaal Professionals.

== Early life and education ==
As a teenager growing up in Sedibeng Lehoko played for his father Shadrack Lehoko's team Real X20 which was based in Sharpeville. By the age of 16 he established himself as one of the best defenders in the Vaal. He was regularly selected in the Sharpeville Invitational XI which played against Moroka Swallows, Orlando Pirates and Kaizer Chiefs on numerous occasions. His brother, Joseph Lehoko nicknamed him "Bull" for his defensive style, which stuck with him.

Lehoko attended Lekoa Shandu and enrolled at the Wilberforce Training College to get a teacher's diploma. At the training college he met former Kaizer Chiefs midfielder Ariel Kgongoane. After qualifying to be a teacher he moved from Sharpeville to Meadowlands Zone 5 and taught in Dobsonville.

== Career ==
Lehoko represented South Africa in 1977 versus Rhodesia.

After his performances at Vaal Professionals Lehoko signed for Kaizer Chiefs in 1978. He was captained by Ryder Mofokeng until his retirement in 1985. He was part of the team that won the quadruple in 1981.

He retired at the age of 34 after a nagging knee injury.

== Later life and death ==
Lehoko coached his former club to 1994 Bob Save Superbowl victory. He ran the Simon Bull Lehoko Foundation with his son, Mojekisane Lehoko.

Lehoko died on 17 April 2025, at the age of 74.
