= National Professional Soccer League =

National Professional Soccer League may refer to either of two defunct professional soccer leagues:

- National Professional Soccer League (1967), merged with the United Soccer Association to form the North American Soccer League
- National Professional Soccer League (South Africa), a South African soccer league from 1971 to 1995
- National Professional Soccer League (1984–2001), originally the American Indoor Soccer Association
