= 1978 NPSL First Division =

National Professional Soccer League
- Season: 1978
- Champions: Lusitano
- Top goalscorer: Thomas ‘Junior’ Ngobe, 40 goals (Witbank Aces)

The 1978 National Professional Soccer League was the first season of the newly-formed multi-racial South African National Professional Soccer League (NPSL). The league was a merger of the previous NPSL, which due to the country's apartheid policies were for black teams only, and the National Football League, for white teams only. It was won by Lusitano.

The third professional league, the non-racial Federation Professional League, continued to function independently.

Lusitano's 13-0 victory over Mangaung United is the largest margin of victory in a top-flight league game in South Africa.

The top scorer was Witbank Ace's Thomas ‘Junior’ Ngobe, with 40 goals.

Pos	Team	Pld	W	D	L	GF	GA	GD	Pts
1	Lusitano	34	29	1	4	119	26	+93	59
2	Wits University	34	26	2	6	80	21	+59	54
3	Arcadia Shepherds	34	22	9	3	89	22	+67	53
4	Kaizer Chiefs	34	21	10	3	63	18	+45	52
5	Highlands Park	34	24	4	6	87	29	+58	52
6	Witbank Black Aces	34	23	6	5	88	41	+47	52
7	Pretoria Callies	34	19	11	4	49	27	+22	49
8	Benoni United	34	23	3	8	72	41	+31	49
9	Moroka Swallows	34	17	8	9	65	44	+21	42
10	Orlando Pirates	34	13	13	8	42	28	+14	39
11	Imperial Callies (R)	34	13	10	11	48	43	+5	36
12	Vaal Professionals	34	9	12	13	46	53	−7	30
13	Colchester United (R)	34	11	8	15	49	61	−12	30
14	Leicester City (R)	34	10	8	16	37	52	−15	28
15	Bloemfontein Celtic (R)	34	10	8	16	53	80	−27	28
16	AmaZulu	34	11	5	18	42	51	−9	27
17	Welkom Real Hearts (R)	34	8	8	18	34	43	−9	24
18	Pilkington United Bros	34	8	7	19	40	63	−23	23
19	Moroka Lions (R)	34	9	3	22	50	79	−29	21
20	African Wanderers	34	6	8	20	31	73	−42	20
21	Sobantu Manchester United (R)	34	5	9	20	31	69	−38	19
22	Lamontville Golden Arrows (R)	34	5	5	24	25	75	−50	15
23	Durban Bush Bucks (R)	34	4	6	24	26	83	−57	14
24	Mangaung United (R)	34	2	5	27	17	124	−107	9

Source: https://www.rsssf.org/tablesz/zaf78.html
(R) Relegated

Relegation criteria are unclear. The league was divided into two zones of 12 clubs, playing each team in their zone twice, and teams in the other zone once.
