= 1998 Bob Save Superbowl =

South African football tournament season

1998 Bob Save Super Bowl
Tournament details
- Country: South Africa

Final positions
- Champions: Mamelodi Sundowns
- Runners-up: Orlando Pirates

The 1998 Bob Save Superbowl was the 1998 season of the South African club football (soccer) knockout tournament, then known as the Bob Save Superbowl for sponsorship reasons.

Mamelodi Sundowns and Orlando Pirates qualified for the final, played on 17 May 1998. The game ended 1–1. However, a replay could not be scheduled in time due to preparations for the 1998 FIFA World Cup, and was only held two months later, on July 25. The game again ended 1–1, with Sundowns triumphing 6–5 on penalties earning a league and cup double after Sundowns won the 1997–98 Premiership.

== Results ==
=== Final ===
17 May 1998

Mamelodi Sundowns	1–1	Orlando Pirates

=== Final (replay) ===
25 July 1998

Mamelodi Sundowns	1–1	Orlando Pirates
Penalties
	6–5
