= Pimville United Brothers F.C. =

South African association football club

Pimville United Brothers
- Nickname(s): PUBS, Skom Boys
- Ground: Jabavu Stadium

Pimville United Brothers was a South African professional soccer club based in Pimville, Soweto.

== History ==
The club rose to prominence in the 1960s, and in 1971 took part in the four-team Champion of Champions tournament that preceded the formation of the National Professional Soccer League, of which they were founding members.

The club became known for its never-say-die attitude, stemming in particular from a famous comeback in the 1970 Life Cup final, where PUBS trailed Kaizer Chiefs 4-0 at halftime before eventually winning 6-5.

A similar comeback was against African Wanderers, where PUBS also came back from 4-0 down, this time with less than 30 minutes to play, eventually winning 6-4.

The club folded in 1974 due to financial difficulties, administrative conflict and community interference. with many of its players signing for Orlando Pirates, Kaizer Chiefs, and Pretoria Callies.

The club was noted for not using muti (due to its Catholic background), a common practice in South African soccer of the era.

== Club honours ==
=== Cups ===
Life Cup

- Winners: 1970

Rogue Cup

- Runners-up: 1970

== League record ==
=== NPSL ===
- 1971 – 5th
- 1974 – 7th
