= 1986 NPSL First Division =

National Premier Soccer League
- Season: 1986

The 1986 National Professional Soccer League of South Africa was divided into divisions known as streams.

== Streams ==
=== "A" Stream ===
Pos	Team	Pld	W	D	L	GF	GA	GD	Pts
1	Vaal Professionals (Sharpeville)	18	14	3	1	44	11	+33	31
2	Orlando Pirates (Soweto)	18	14	2	2	56	23	+33	30
3	Pretoria Home Celtics (Mamelodi).	18	12	3	3	63	22	+41	27
4	Midway Toyota (Thokoza)	18	7	4	7	34	32	+2	18
5	Benoni United	18	3	9	6	25	31	−6	15
6	Inter Lincoln	18	4	5	9	22	36	−14	13
7	Continentals (Witbank)	18	4	3	11	30	43	−13	11
8	Adriatica (Johannesburg)	18	4	2	12	25	46	−21	10

=== "B" Stream ===
Pos	Team	Pld	W	D	L	GF	GA	GD	Pts
1	Bloemfontein Young Tigers (Bloemfontein)	22	16	4	2	55	23	+32	36
2	Secunda Aces	22	15	5	2	46	14	+32	35
3	Peace Makers	22	12	5	5	50	37	+13	29
4	Birds	22	9	5	8	53	33	+20	23
5	North Stars	23	8	4	11	32	36	−4	20
6	Chipako	22	7	5	10	32	40	−8	19
7	Maholosiane FC	22	8	2	12	33	35	−2	18
8	Newcastle United (Newcastle)	22	5	7	10	24	26	−2	17
9	Mamelodi United	22	5	6	11	29	38	−9	16
10	Ace Mates (Soweto)	22	5	3	14	25	39	−14	13
11	Boksburg United	22	3	1	18	22	69	−47	7
