= 1998–99 South African Premiership =

Premiership
- Season: 1998–99
- Champions: Mamelodi Sundowns; 2nd Premiership title 5th South African title
- Relegated: Vaal Professionals; Dynamos
- CAF Champions League: Mamelodi Sundowns
- African Cup Winners' Cup: SuperSport United
- CAF Cup: Kaizer Chiefs
- Matches: 306
- Goals: 782 (2.56 per match)
- Top goalscorer: Pollen Ndlanya; Kaizer Chiefs (21 goals)
- Biggest home win: Mamelodi Sundowns 7–1 Santos; Mamelodi Sundowns 7–1 Vaal Professionals (3 February 1999)
- Biggest away win: Mamelodi Sundowns 0–4 SuperSport United; Dynamos 0–4 Qwa Qwa Stars; Hellenic 0–4 Cape Town Spurs; Moroka Swallows 0–4 SuperSport United
- Highest scoring: Manning Rangers 5–4 Vaal Professionals; Cape Town Spurs 4–5 Kaizer Chiefs (9 goals)

The 1998–99 Premiership, known as the 1998–99 Castle Premiership for sponsorship purposes, and also commonly referred to as the PSL after the governing body, was the third season of the Premiership since its establishment in 1996. The season began on 31 July 1998 and ended on 9 June 1999. Mamelodi Sundowns became the first team in Premiership history to defend their title as they won their second straight Premiership title and their fifth South African title after previously winning the Premiership's predecessor - the National Soccer League - on three occasions (1988, 1990 and 1993). In a hotly contested title race between Sundowns and Kaizer Chiefs it came down to goal difference to separate the two as both finished on a joint record 75 points. A margin of +5 in goal difference was all that separated the two teams as Sundowns won their second in what would be a hat-trick of Premiership titles.

As before, the league was contested by 18 teams, sixteen returning from the 1997–98 season and two newly promoted clubs; Dynamos and Seven Stars. The league would also continue to run parallel to the European football calendar (August–May) and not run concurrently with the African football calendar (January–December).

Sundowns 15 : 2 Chiefs

== Season summary ==
The Mamelodi Sundowns and Kaizer Chiefs - finishing as runners-up for the third successive season - finished 15 points ahead of third place and in the process scored 10 more league goals than the next best team.

Both clubs ended the season with a record 75 points but the Brazilians lifted the trophy thanks to a superior goal difference (+44 versus Chiefs’ +39) after a gripping finale to the season that saw them at a level pegging for the last four rounds of league games.

A 5-1 win on the last day of the season over Dynamos wasn’t enough for the Amakhosi, as Sundowns’ 2-0 win over Cape Town Spurs put them top of the pile and handed them a second successive title.

Orlando Pirates again finished third, 15 points off the pace of the top two. Manning Rangers came in fourth, level on points with the Buccaneers for the second season in a row, while newly promoted Seven Stars had a fairlytale run into fifth place. Qwa Qwa Stars came in sixth with Bloemfontein Celtic and SuperSport United rounding out the top-eight in seventh and eighth places respectively.

Soweto giants Moroka Swallows continued to disappoint as they endured a terrible season, ending 15th on the log, while Santos finished just above the relegation zone once again, albeit a lot more comfortably than they did a year ago.

The two teams that were relegated this season were Dynamos and Vaal Professionals. Dynamos finished six points away from Santos, while Vaal Professionals finished 8 points behind Dynamos. Dynamos bagged a record low 20 goals this season, and the Vaal Professionals conceded a record high 74 goals. Vaal Professionals would not return to the Premiership and would cease to exist entirely by the end of the decade.

== Final table ==
Pos	Team	Pld	W	D	L	GF	GA	GD	Pts	Qualification or relegation
1	Mamelodi Sundowns (C)	34	23	6	5	70	26	+44	75	2000 CAF Champions League first round (Note: Due to the Premiership following a different football calendar to the rest of Africa, which runs over a single calendar year and not the international August–May calendar followed by the Premiership, Mamelodi Sundowns, Kaizer Chiefs & SuperSport United were only eligible to enter the 2000 editions of the respective CAF competitions they qualified for.)
2	Kaizer Chiefs	34	23	6	5	73	34	+39	75	2000 CAF Cup first round
3	Orlando Pirates	34	17	9	8	55	28	+27	60	
4	Manning Rangers	34	17	9	8	60	38	+22	60	
5	Seven Stars	34	15	7	12	40	41	−1	52	
6	Qwa Qwa Stars	34	13	11	10	43	39	+4	50	
7	Bloemfontein Celtic	34	13	8	13	33	34	−1	47	
8	SuperSport United	34	11	13	10	45	38	+7	46	2000 African Cup Winners' Cup first round
9	Bush Bucks	34	13	5	16	48	57	−9	44	
10	Jomo Cosmos	34	11	10	13	37	39	−2	43	
11	Wits University	34	9	13	12	31	39	−8	40	
12	Hellenic	34	8	16	10	32	43	−11	40	
13	Cape Town Spurs	34	9	12	13	52	50	+2	39	
14	AmaZulu	34	10	9	15	40	53	−13	39	
15	Moroka Swallows	34	9	10	15	29	44	−15	37	
16	Santos	34	7	14	13	36	54	−18	35	
17	Dynamos (R)	34	7	8	19	20	51	−31	29	Relegated to the National First Division
18	Vaal Professionals (R)	34	5	6	23	38	74	−36	21	Relegated to the National First Division

Source: rsssf.com
(C) Champions; (R) Relegated
