= 2000–01 South African Premiership =

Premiership
- Season: 2000–01
- Champions: Orlando Pirates
- Relegated: African Wanderers, Bloemfontein Celtic

The 2000–01 South African Premiership, known as the 2000–01 Castle Premiership for sponsorship purposes, and also commonly referred to as the PSL after the governing body, was the fifth season of the Premiership since its establishment in 1996. It was won by Orlando Pirates.

Bloemfontein Celtic were fined R75,000 and deducted three points for fielding an ineligible player, and were relegated along with African Wanderers. Both teams appealed their relegation, but were unsuccessful.

== Final table ==
Pos	Team	Pld	W	D	L	GF	GA	GD	Pts	Qualification or relegation
1	Orlando Pirates	34	16	13	5	60	34	+26	61	Champions
2	Kaizer Chiefs	34	16	12	6	41	25	+16	60	
3	Mamelodi Sundowns	34	17	8	9	58	32	+26	59	
4	Jomo Cosmos	34	15	11	8	47	27	+20	56	
5	Santos	34	15	11	8	40	32	+8	56	
6	Free State Stars	34	15	10	9	40	30	+10	55	
7	Ria Stars	34	13	12	9	43	40	+3	51	
8	Supersport United	34	12	11	11	42	35	+7	47	
9	Lamontville Golden Arrows	34	11	12	11	38	39	−1	45	
10	Umtata Bush Bucks	34	12	8	14	38	45	−7	44	
11	Ajax Cape Town	34	10	10	14	37	46	−9	40	
12	Tembisa Classic	34	9	12	13	26	40	−14	39	
13	Wits University	34	8	14	12	33	43	−10	38	
14	Hellenic FC	34	7	15	12	32	40	−8	36	
15	Moroka Swallows	34	7	14	13	35	45	−10	35	
16	Manning Rangers	34	9	7	18	49	60	−11	34	
17	Bloemfontein Celtic	34	9	10	15	35	46	−11	34 (Note: Bloemfontein Celtic deducted three points for fielding ineligible player.)	Relegated
18	African Wanderers	34	6	8	20	31	66	−35	26	Relegated

Source: rsssf.com
