= Clive Barker (soccer) =

South African football coach (1944–2023)

Personal information
- Full name: Clive William Barker
- Date of birth: 19 June 1944
- Place of birth: Durban, Natal, South Africa
- Date of death: 10 June 2023 (aged 78)
- Place of death: Durban, KwaZulu-Natal, South Africa

Senior career*
Years	Team	Apps	(Gls)
1962	Durban City		
1963–1969	Durban United		

Managerial career
- 1973: Fynnlands
- 1974–76: AmaZulu
- 1976: Pinetown Celtic
- 1978–1981: Juventus Durban
- 1981–1983: Durban City
- 1984–1985: Durban Bush Bucks
- 1986–1987: AmaZulu
- 1988–1989: Yellowwood Park
- 1991–1993: AmaZulu
- 1994–1997: South Africa
- 1997–1999: AmaZulu
- 2000–2001: Santos Cape Town
- 2001–2003: Manning Rangers
- 2003: Maritzburg United
- 2004: Zulu Royals
- 2005: Manning Rangers
- 2005: Santos Cape Town
- 2006: Bush Bucks
- 2006: AmaZulu
- 2007–2009: AmaZulu
- 2013: Bidvest Wits
- 2013–2015: Mpumalanga Black Aces
- 2015–2016: Maritzburg United
Medal record
Men's football
Representing South Africa (as manager)
Africa Cup of Nations
Winner	1996
- * Club domestic league appearances and goals

Clive William Barker (23 June 1944 – 10 June 2023) was a South African football coach. He guided the South Africa national team to their only Africa Cup of Nations title in 1996. He was uncle of Steve Barker.

== Playing career ==
Barker was born in Durban, KwaZulu-Natal. He became a professional footballer in the 1960s, playing for Durban City and Durban United having made his debut at the age of 17. He had a trial with Leicester City, but a serious knee injury quickly ended his career.

== Managerial career ==
"The Dog", as he is nicknamed, became a manager in the 1970s, coaching numerous clubs in South Africa, including Durban City, Manning Rangers, AmaZulu (Zulu Royals) and Santos Cape Town.

During his club career he won two league championships and two league cups. He was one of the first white managers of a black team in the South African league.

Barker took over as manager of the South Africa national team in 1994 after the team was reinstated after a ban due to apartheid. He took the South Africa national team to their only Africa Cup of Nations title in 1996, with a 2–0 victory in the final against Tunisia. Under his guidance South Africa qualified for the 1998 FIFA World Cup, their first World Cup. He quit in December 1997, before the team could compete in the World Cup finals, after a poor showing at the 1997 FIFA Confederations Cup.

Barker was a local television commentator during the 2010 FIFA World Cup.

Barker was appointed manager of Bidvest Wits in January 2013.

== Personal life and death ==
Barker's son, John Barker, is a South African filmmaker. Barker's nephew Steve Barker followed in Clive's footsteps as a soccer manager.

Barker was diagnosed with Lewy body dementia in 2023. He died in Durban on 10 June 2023, at the age of 78.
