= July Mahlangu =

South African soccer player

Personal information
- Full name: July Mahlangu
- Date of birth: 5 July 1980 (age 46)
- Place of birth: Kwaggafontein, South Africa
- Height: 1.77 m (5 ft 10 in)
- Position: Midfielder

Team information
- Current team: Thanda Royal Zulu

Senior career*
Years	Team	Apps	(Gls)
–2007	Benoni Premier United	?	(?)
2007–	Thanda Royal Zulu	?	(?)
- * Club domestic league appearances and goals as of 31 August 2007 ‡ National team caps and goals as of 31 August 2007

July Mahlangu (born 5 July 1980) is a South African soccer player who plays as a midfielder for Thanda Royal Zulu.

Mahlangu previously played in South Africa for Benoni Premier United F.C.
