= 1994 Bob Save Superbowl =

South African football tournament season

1994 Bob Save Super Bowl
Tournament details
- Country: South Africa

Final positions
- Champions: Vaal Professionals
- Runners-up: Qwa Qwa Stars

The 1994 Bob Save Superbowl was the 1994 season of the South African club football (soccer) knockout tournament, then known as the Bob Save Superbowl for sponsorship reasons.

It was won by Vaal Professionals, coached by Simon Lehoko, with the winning goal scored by Robinson Seakamela.

== Results ==
=== Final ===
Vaal Professionals	1–0	Qwa Qwa Stars
