= Ria Stars F.C. =

South African football club

- Nickname(s): Manyora (Petty Thieves)
- Founded: 1989
- Dissolved: 2002
- Ground: Pietersburg, Limpopo
- Chairman: Ria Ledwaba

Ria Stars was a South African football club from Pietersburg. The club was owned by businesswoman Ria Ledwaba and nicknamed Manyora (Petty Thieves).

They were formed in 1989 and in 2000 they were promoted to the Premiership after winning the Inland Stream of the 1999–2000 National First Division. In 2002 Ria Stars were bought out by the league for 8 million rand (roughly US$800,000) in order to reduce fixture congestion.
