= 1997–98 South African Premiership =

Premiership
- Season: 1997–98
- Champions: Mamelodi Sundowns; 1st Premiership title 4th South African title
- Relegated: Real Rovers; African Wanderers
- CAF Champions League: Mamelodi Sundowns
- African Cup Winners' Cup: Orlando Pirates
- Matches: 306
- Goals: 736 (2.41 per match)
- Top goalscorer: George Koumantarakis; Manning Rangers (14 goals)
- Biggest home win: Hellenic 5–0 Santos (9 August 1997); Mamelodi Sundowns 5–0 Santos (9 November 1997)
- Biggest away win: AmaZulu 0–6 African Wanderers (22 February 1998)
- Highest scoring: SuperSport United 4-4 Manning Rangers (8 goals) (28 November 1997)

The 1997–98 Premiership, known as the 1997–98 Castle Premiership for sponsorship purposes, and also commonly referred to as the PSL after the governing body, was the second season of the Premiership, the top tier football league in South Africa, since its establishment in 1996. The season began on 1 August 1997 and ended on 13 May 1998. Mamelodi Sundowns won their first Premiership title and their fourth South African title after previously winning the Premiership's predecessor - the National Soccer League - on three occasions (1988, 1990 and 1993). This victory would be the first in a hat-trick of Premiership titles for Sundowns, as the team from Pretoria would go on to dominate the league for the next two seasons. Sundowns also won a league and cup double after winning the 1998 Bob Save Superbowl later that year.

As in the inaugural season, the league was contested by 18 teams, sixteen returning from the 1996-97 season and two newly promoted clubs; African Wanderers and Santos. The league would also continue to run parallel to the European football calendar (August–May) and not run concurrently with the African football calendar (January–December).

== Club name changes ==
Eastern Cape club Umtata Bush Bucks decided to drop Umtata from their name from the 1997-98 season, and were instead simply referred to as Bush Bucks.

== Season summary ==
Manning Rangers found themselves unable to retain their title as they slipped to fifth place in the final standings, some 11 points behind eventual champions Mamelodi Sundowns, who won the first of what would be three successive Premiership titles.

Kaizer Chiefs finished in the runners-up spot for the second successive season after finishing five points behind the brilliant Brazilians. The Pretoria giants based their success on a rock-solid defence – just 25 goals conceded in 34 matches – and they were immensely difficult to beat, suffering just four defeats the whole season. The Brazilians racked up 68 points, five more than Chiefs could manage.

While it was déjà vu for the Amakhosi in finishing second, the same could be said for Orlando Pirates in third. The Buccaneers picked up 57 points in the season, the same as Cape Town Spurs and reigning champions Manning Rangers, but their superior goal difference at least saw them end in the top three.

Bush Bucks, Jomo Cosmos and Wits University rounded off the top eight teams.

Moroka Swallows and Bloemfontein Celtic again finished in mid-table, while a fierce relegation battle almost saw the likes of SuperSport United, AmaZulu and Santos suffer the drop.

In a tense relegation battle that raged into the final day of the season, it was newly promoted African Wanderers and Real Rovers - who had managed to avoid the drop by a single point last season - that suffered the ignominy of relegation from the Premiership. They each finished on 31 points, just two adrift of Santos and AmaZulu in 16th and 15th place respectively. Heading into the penultimate round of matches Santos had found themselves rooted to the bottom of the table on 27 points, 3 points adrift of Real Rovers and safety. Santos managed to string together two straight wins to end the season with a 1-0 away win against Wits University and crucially, a 2-1 home victory over fellow relegation strugglers African Wanderers on the final day. Before losing to Santos on the final day, African Wanderers had managed to hold Soweto giants Orlando Pirates to a goalless draw, leaving them confident of securing the result required against Santos to ensure their status as a Premiership club. In the meantime, Real Rovers, who had found themselves safe with two games to go, suffered two straight defeats, which coupled with Santos' two victories confirmed their relegation. Relegation would prove to have a disastrous effect on Real Rovers as they would not return and ultimately the club would cease operations at the conclusion of the 2000-01 season.

== Final table ==
Pos	Team	Pld	W	D	L	GF	GA	GD	Pts	Qualification or relegation
1	Mamelodi Sundowns (C)	34	19	11	4	48	25	+23	68	1999 CAF Champions League First Round (Note: Due to the Premiership following a different football calendar to the rest of Africa, which runs over a single calendar year and not the international August–May calendar followed by the Premiership, Mamelodi Sundowns & Orlando Pirates were only eligible to enter the 1999 editions of the respective CAF competitions they qualified for.)
2	Kaizer Chiefs	34	17	12	5	52	35	+17	63	
3	Orlando Pirates	34	15	12	7	52	33	+19	57	1999 African Cup Winners' Cup first round
4	Cape Town Spurs	34	15	12	7	51	35	+16	57	
5	Manning Rangers	34	16	9	9	58	47	+11	57	
6	Bush Bucks	34	14	12	8	42	38	+4	54	
7	Jomo Cosmos	34	13	12	9	31	31	0	51	
8	Wits University	34	13	9	12	39	34	+5	48	
9	Qwa Qwa Stars	34	12	10	12	33	34	−1	46	
10	Hellenic	34	12	8	14	45	42	+3	44	
11	Moroka Swallows	34	12	6	16	30	42	−12	42	
12	Bloemfontein Celtic	34	12	5	17	38	46	−8	41	
13	Vaal Professionals	34	8	14	12	36	44	−8	38	
14	SuperSport United	34	7	15	12	34	37	−3	36	
15	AmaZulu	34	8	9	17	36	46	−10	33	
16	Santos	34	10	3	21	34	61	−27	33	
17	African Wanderers (R)	34	7	10	17	43	56	−13	31	Relegated to the National First Division
18	Real Rovers (R)	34	8	7	19	34	50	−16	31	Relegated to the National First Division

Source: rsssf.com
(C) Champions; (R) Relegated
