= 1971 NPSL First Division =

- Champions: Orlando Pirates (1st title)
- Relegated: none
- Matches played: 156
- Goals scored: 851 (5.46 per match)

The 1971 National Professional Soccer League season was the first season of the National Professional Soccer League. Orlando Pirates won the inaugural title.

At the time, due to the country's apartheid policies, the competition was only open to black South African teams, and it ran in parallel with the FPL and the NFL.

== Table ==
Pos	Team	Pld	W	D	L	GF	GA	GD	Pts
1	Orlando Pirates (C)	24	17	4	3	81	33	+48	38
2	Kaizer Chiefs	24	18	1	5	83	41	+42	37
3	Moroka Swallows Big XV	24	15	5	4	75	49	+26	35
4	Witbank Black Aces	24	17	0	7	85	43	+42	34
5	Pimville United Bros	24	13	3	8	79	53	+26	29
6	Zulu Royals	24	10	3	11	80	88	−8	23
7	Bantu Callies	24	10	1	13	64	68	−4	21
8	Mamelodi XI (Note: Mamelodi XI disbanded after one season)	24	8	4	12	50	99	−49	20
9	Vaal Professionals	24	7	5	12	57	68	−11	19
10	Lamontville Golden Arrows	24	9	1	14	50	61	−11	19
11	Real Katlehong City	24	7	1	16	57	76	−19	15
12	Bloemfontein Celtic	24	5	4	15	42	69	−27	14
13	Kimberly Dalton Bros	24	2	4	18	48	110	−62	8

(C) Champions
