= Benoni United F.C. =

Benoni United FC
- Nicknames: "The Rabbits", "Up The Rabbits", "Amadlebe", "Pride of the East Rand"
- Founded: 1972
- Dissolved: 1986 and 2008
- Stadium: Sinaba Stadium
- Capacity: 25,000
- Owner: Leza Private Equity
- Chairman: Nkateko "Soshangane" Khoza
- Website: www.uptherabbits.com

Benoni United Football Club (known as The Rabbits) is a South African football club based in Daveyton, Benoni, east of Johannesburg in the City of Ekurhuleni, formerly known as the East Rand. The club is nicknamed "The Rabbits", a reference to the City of Benoni's association with rabbits and its Bunny Park sanctuary.

Originally founded in 1915, the club has undergone several dissolutions and revivals. Its most prominent period came in the 1970s during its second iteration, competing in the NPSL. The club currently plays in the SAFA Regional League Ekurhuleni and holds its home games at Sinaba Stadium.

== History ==
=== Original Benoni United ===
In 1915 Benoni United was founded as a collection of amateur players. The National Football League (NFL), the first professional association football league in South Africa, was established in 1959 amid protest from SAFA, which governed amateur football in the country. Clubs were formally registered, and Benoni United used this year as its formal founding date. The NFL only admitted white players; as a result, the black players active up to that point were expelled. Willie Havenga (Benoni United) scored the first ever professional goal in South Africa. Rocco Smith (Benoni United) won the first ever Player of the Year Award.

In 1963 Benoni United merges with Brakpan United and Springs United to form East Rand United the merger is short lived and Benoni United exits the merger when ERU is relegated in 1966 and resurfaces in the NFL first Division as Benoni United.

=== Second Iteration ===
In 1969 the black former players of Benoni United formed a breakaway group and began making plans to create a new Benoni United (The Rabbits), which would seek membership in the NPSL ahead of its 1971 launch. However, due to administrative issues, Benoni United failed to become one of the founding members of the NPSL. Later in the same year, after the NPSL's launch, Mickey Bookholoane was informed that Nigel United Buccaneers, which campaigned in the NPSL, was experiencing financial difficulties. He arranged to meet with the owner, Matt Mphahane, to acquire the status of the club. To succeed, Mickey invited local doctors and businessmen to join forces and fund the club. The group elected Dr Harrison Motlana as the founding chairman and Mickey as the secretary. The deal was sanctioned by the NPSL and Benoni United prepared to rejoin the Professional Ranks, the club used 1972 date as the club founding date for the second iteration of Benoni United. In the 1980s the team was sponsored by Kwitkot and sold the naming rights and became known as Kwikot Benoni.

=== Third Iteration* ===
Premier United owner Dumisani Ndlovu purchased the status of Hellenic F.C., moving the club from Cape Town to Benoni. The club was renamed Benoni Premier United and regained top-flight status the following season. While it was seen as a new club, Benoni Premier United used the club emblem, slogan, and founding date of Benoni United and was considered a continuation of Benoni United. The club finished 15th in the 18-team PSL in its first campaign. Its premiership status was then sold in the middle of the second season, and the club was renamed Thanda Royal Zulu, which later sold its PSL status to AmaZulu.

=== Fourth Iteration (Current) ===
In 2011 the name rights and intellectual property of Benoni United, The Rabbits, Up The Rabbits were acquired by a private company. In 2023 the Shepherds Sporting Group announced plans to relaunch Benoni United in 2024. The club has been revived and is currently in the SAFA Regional League Ekurhuleni. There are plans in place to return the club to the top flight in the coming seasons.

== NFL records ==
YEAR	LEAGUE POSITION	FOOTBALL ASSOCIATION CUP	CASTLE CUP
1959	6th		Semi-Final
1960	4th		Semi-Final
1961	4th		Quarter Final
1962	12th		Quarter Final
1963	Merged to create ERU		
1964	17th Relegated as ERU		

== NPSL records ==
Yeay	league Position	Football Association Cup	Top 8
1973	12th	Last 16	DNQ
1974	10th	Quarter Final	DNQ
1975	6th	Quarter Final	DNQ
1976	9th	Semi Final	Semi Final
1977	2nd	Quarter Final	2nd
1978	7th	Quarter Final	Semi Final
1979	15th	Last 16	Quarter Final
1980	13th	Last 16	DNQ
1981	10th	Quarter Final	DNQ
1982	13th	Last 32	DNQ
1983	12th	Last 16	DNQ
1984	16th	Last 16	DNQ
1985	17th Relegated	Last 32	DNQ
1986	First Division		
1987	Relegated from FD		
1988	Ceases Operations		

== Records (PSL era) ==
Year	League Position	Football Association Cup	Top 8
2005–06	4th (promoted from NFD)		
2006–07	14th		
2007–08	Status sold to Thanda Royal Zulu		

=== Crest and colours ===
The Club uses sky blue, blue, gold, dark gold, and black colors as its home colours and has a rabbit with a ball depicted inside a circle, it uses Orange and black as away colours this was introduced during the sponsorship from Kwikot.

=== Kit manufacturers and sponsors ===
Period	Kit Manufacturer	Shirt Sponsor
1959-1963		
1972-1983	Adidas	Benoni United
1984-1987	Adidas	Kwikot
2005	Diadora	Mvelaphanda
2006	Adidas	Vodacom
2025	RXBXT	ANZAR

== Notable people ==
=== Coaches and managers ===
Jingles Pereira popularly known as "Baba ka Sibongile" Played and Coached the Team from 1983–85

=== Players ===
- Roger De Sa played for Kwikot Benoni 1984-1985 after being recruited by Jingles Pereira
- Kenneth Mogojoa "The Horse" scored 88 goals in a single season, club top scorer.
- Sam "Happy Cow" Nkomo
- Andries Maseko - Club broke the transfer record to sign Maseko.
- Tsepo Masilela - 2004 - 2008
- Bernard Parker - 2004 -2008
- July Mahlangu - 2003 -2008
