= Soccer in South Africa =

- Country: South Africa
- Governing body: SAFA
- National team: South Africa
- Nickname: Bafana Bafana (National team)
- First played: late-19th century
- Registered players: 1,469,410 (registered); 4,540,410 (total)
- Clubs: 900

National competitions
- FIFA World Cup; Africa Cup of Nations

Club competitions
- List: League South African Premiership National First Division SAFA Second Division SAFA Regional League; Cups Carling Knockout Cup MTN 8 Nedbank Cup

International competitions
- FIFA Club World Cup; CAF Champions League; CAF Confederation Cup; CAF Super Cup

Football, or as its more commonly referred to in South Africa, soccer, is the nation's most popular sport followed by rugby union and cricket. The governing body is the South African Football Association (SAFA), while the Premier Soccer League is the organisation responsible for running the country's two professional divisions, namely the South African Premiership and the National First Division. The main cup competitions are the Nedbank Cup and the MTN 8 Cup.

== History ==
Soccer first arrived in South Africa through colonialism in the late nineteenth century, as the game was popular among British soldiers. From the earliest days of the sport in South Africa until the end of apartheid, organised soccer was affected by the country's system of racial segregation. The all-white Football Association of South Africa (FASA), was formed in 1892, while the South African Indian Football Association (SAIFA), the South African Bantu Football Association (SABFA) and the South African Coloured Football Association (SACFA) were founded in 1903, 1933 and 1936 respectively.

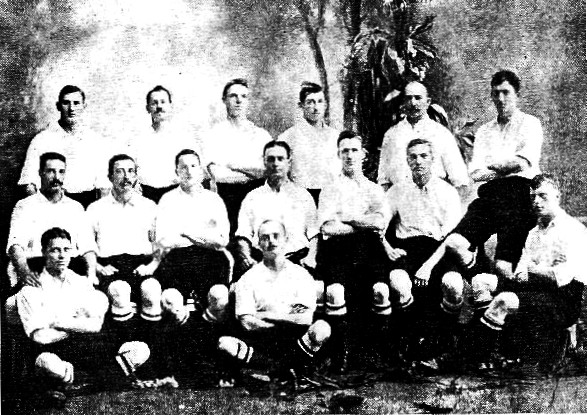
The South African team that toured South America in 1906. They played 11 matches with only one defeat

In 1903 the SAFA re-affiliated with the English The Football Association after the Second Boer War between the British Empire and the Boer states. There was a plan to play a tournament held in Argentina, with South Africa and Fulham as guest teams, but it was not carried out. Nevertheless, South Africa traveled to South America in 1906 to play a series of friendly matches there.

South Africa played a total of 12 matches in South America, winning 11 with 60 goals scored and only 7 conceded. Some of the rivals were Belgrano A.C., Argentina national team, a Liga Rosarina combined, Estudiantes (BA) and Quilmes. The only team that could beat South Africa was Argentine Alumni by 1–0 at Sociedad Sportiva stadium of Buenos Aires, on 24 June, although the South African would take revenge on 22 July, defeating Alumni by 2–0.

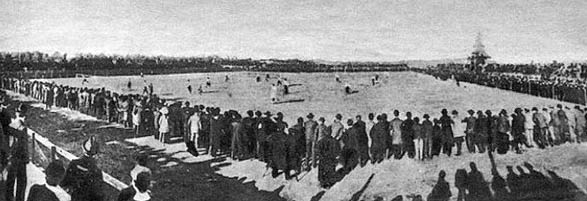
South Africa playing Alumni in Buenos Aires, 1906

The players were exclusively white, civil servants, government employees, bankers and civil engineers. Seven of the 15 players were born in South Africa and 8 originated from England and Scotland.

South Africa was one of four African nations to attend FIFA's 1953 congress, at which the four demanded, and won, representation on the FIFA executive committee. Thus the four nations (South Africa, Ethiopia, Egypt and Sudan) founded the Confederation of African Football in 1956, and the South African representative, Fred Fell, sat at the first meeting as a founding member. It soon became clear however that South Africa's constitution prohibited racially mixed teams from competitive sport and so they could only send either an all-black side or an all-white side to the planned 1957 African Cup of Nations. This was unacceptable to the other members of the Confederation and South Africa were disqualified from the competition, however some sources say that they withdrew voluntarily.

At the second CAF conference in 1958 South Africa were formally expelled from CAF. The all-white (FASA) were admitted to FIFA in the same year, but in August 1960 it was given an ultimatum of one year to fall in line with the non-discriminatory regulations of FIFA. On 26 September 1961 at the annual FIFA conference, the South African association was formally suspended from FIFA. Sir Stanley Rous, president of The Football Association of England and a champion of South Africa's FIFA membership, was elected FIFA President a few days later. Rous was adamant that sport, and FIFA in particular, should not embroil itself in political matters and against fierce opposition he continued to resist attempts to expel South Africa from FIFA. The suspension was lifted in January 1963 after a visit to South Africa by Rous in order to investigate the state of soccer in the country.

Rous declared that if the suspension were not lifted, soccer there would be discontinued, possibly to the point of no recovery. The next annual conference of FIFA in October 1964 took place in Tokyo and was attended by a larger contingent of representatives from African and Asian associations and here the suspension of South Africa's membership was re-imposed. In 1976, after the Soweto uprising, they were formally expelled from FIFA. South Africa was suspended by FIFA from 1961 to 1992 because of the country's apartheid policies, banning the country from international competition (including the FIFA World Cup), and severely stunting the growth of the domestic game.

In 1991, when the apartheid system was beginning to be demolished, a new non-racial South African Football Association was formed, and admitted to FIFA. On 7 July 1992, the South African national team played their first game in two decades, beating Cameroon 1–0. Since the integration of the country, it has developed the most sophisticated professional soccer structure in Africa, the Premier Soccer League. South Africa qualified for the 1998 and 2002 World Cups, but failed to progress past the group stage both times. They hosted (and won) the 1996 African Cup of Nations and hosted the 2010 World Cup, the first African nation to do so.

== Football association ==
The first non-racial, singular football association in South Africa was formed in 1991, and named the South African Football Association (SAFA). Previously, there had been a number of different, racially divided football bodies. These bodies, the Football Association of South Africa, the South African Soccer Association, the South African Soccer Federation and the South African National Football Association came together to form SAFA on 8 December 1991. SAFA was given observer status at the Confederation of African Football in January 1992. The association was accepted into FIFA in June 1992, allowing its teams to play international matches.

SAFA currently control all national soccer teams, and most soccer leagues in South Africa. The notable exceptions are the Premiership and the National First Division, the top two leagues in the country. The leagues are controlled by the Premier Soccer League, which also controls most major cup competitions.

== League system ==
South Africa has a number of different soccer leagues, controlled by different organisations. The top two leagues are professional or semi-professional, and run by the PSL. The lower leagues are mostly amateur, and run by SAFA.

1	Premiership	Betway Premiership (16 teams)								
2	National First Division	Motsepe Foundation Championship (16 teams)								
3	SAFA Second Division	Eastern Cape (16 teams)	KwaZulu-Natal (16 teams)	Northern Cape (16 teams)	Western Cape (16 teams)	Free State (16 teams)	Gauteng (16 teams)	Limpopo (16 teams)	Mpumalanga (16 teams)	North West (16 teams)
4	SAFA Regional League	Alfred Nzo; Amathole; Cacadu; Chris Hani; Nelson Mandela Bay; OR Tambo; Ukhahlamba	Amajuba; Ethekwini; iLembe; Sisonke; Ugu; Umgungundlovu; Umkhanyakude; Umzinyathi; Uthukela; Uthungulu; Zululand	Frances Baard; Kgalagadi; Namakwa; Pixley-Ka-Seme; Siyanda	Boland; Cape Town; Central Karoo; Eden; Overberg; West Coast	Fezile Dabi; Lejweleputswa; Motheo; Thabo Mofutsanyana; Xhariep	Ekurhuleni; Johannesburg; Metsweding; Sedibeng; Tshwane; West Rand	Capricorn; Mopani; Sekhukhune; Vhembe; Waterberg	Ehlanzeni; Gert Sibande; Nkangala	Bojanala; Bophirima; Central; Southern
5	Local Football Association Leagues	Nelson Mandela Bay: KUYGA (Greenbushes area); LAROFA (Langa and Rosedale); MOFA (Motherwell area); NAFA (Northern areas); NEBFA (Newbrighton area); NODEFA (Nobuhle, Khayelitsha and Despatch); PEEFA (Port Elizabeth East area); PEFA (Western suburbs); PENFA (Port Elizabeth North area); WAFA (Walmer area); ZAFA (Zakhele area); ZWIFA (Zwidearea); Chris Hani: Emalahleni; Engcobo; Inkwanca; Intsika Yethu; Inxuba Yethemba; Lukanji; Sakhisizwe; Tsolwana; Cacadu/Sarah Baartman: Baviaans; Blue Crane Route; Camdeboo; Ikwezi; Kouga; Kou-kamma; Makana; Ndlambe; Sunday's River Valle; Amahlathi: Great kei; Mbashe; Mnguma; Ngqushwa; Nkonkobe; Nxuba; Joe Gqabi: Elundi; Gariep; Maletswai; Senqu; Alfred Nzo: Matatiele; Mbizana; Ntabankulu; Umzimvubu; O.R. Tambo: King Sabata Dalindyebo; Mhlontlo; Nqguza Hill; Nyandeni; Port St Johns; Buffalo City: Bunkers West; East London Central; East London North; East London West; King Central; King East; Mdantsane; Royal Rharhabe	Ugu: Hibiscus; Umdoni; uMuziwabantu; Umzumbe; Vulamehlo; Zingoleni; SAFA Umgungundlovu: Impendle; Mkhambathini; Mpofana; Richmond; The Msunduzi; uMngeni; uMshwathi; Uthukela: Emnambithi / Ladysmith; Imbabazane; Indaka; Okhahlamba; Umtshezi; SAFA Umzinyathi: Emdumeni; Msinga; Nquthu; Umvoti; Amajuba: Dannhauser; Emandlangeni; New Castle; Zululand: eDumbe; Nongoma; Ulundi; UPhongolo; Umkhanyakude: Jozini; Mtubatuba; The Big 5 False Bay; Umhlabuyalingana; Uthungulu: Mfolozi; Mtambanana; Mthonjaneni; Nkandla; uMhlathuze; uMlalazi; Ilembe: KwaDukuza; Mandeni; Maphumulo; Ndwedwe; Sisonke/Harry Gwala: Ebuhlebezwe; Greater Kokstad; Ingwe; Kwa Sani; Umzimkhulu; Ethekwini: Chatsworth; Clermont; Durban Central; Durban South; Greater Durban; Greater Cato Ridge; Greater Hillcrest; Hammersdale; Inanda; Kwa Mashu; Ntuzuma; Phoenix; Pinetown; Pinetown South; Reunion; Tongaat; Umlazi; Verulam; Amanzimtoti; Umbumbulu; Umkhomazi	Cape Town: Atlantis; Athlone-Heideveld; Tygerberg; Crossroads; Delft-Mfuleni; Good Hope; Guguletu; Helderberg; Khayelitsha; Mandela Park; Metropolitan; Mitchells Plain; Langa Ndabeni; Northern Suburbs; Nyanga; Two Ocean; Oostenberg; Greater Philippi; Manenberg; Rygate; Cape District; Lingelethu; Masakhane; Dunoon; Makhaza; Mfuleni; South Peninsula		Johannesburg: Alex North; Deep South; Eldorado; Greater Mayfair; Jowest; Midrand; Orange Farm; Rand Central; Roodepoort; Soweto				

=== South African Premiership ===
The Premier Soccer League, the league's governing body, was founded in 1996, as a merger between the National Premier Soccer League and the National Soccer League. The Premiership is the current top league in South Africa, with the winner being crowned as the national champion. The league is made up of 16 teams, all of which are professional. At the end of each season one team is automatically relegated to the National First Division, a second team may also be relegated through a play-off. The relegated teams are replaced by one or two teams from the National First Division.

=== National First Division ===
The National First Division is the current second tier in South African soccer. The league is made up of 16 teams, which are either professional or semi-professional. The league is governed and controlled by the Premier Soccer League. The league winner is automatically promoted to the Premiership at the end of the season. Another highly placed team may also be promoted through a play-off. At the end of the season the bottom two clubs are relegated, and replaced by two play-off winners from the SAFA Second Division.

=== SAFA Second Division ===
The SAFA Second Division is the third tier of South African soccer, and the highest tier directly controlled by the South African Football Association. The league is played on a provincial basis, with nine separate provincial competitions (some having parallel streams), and is made up mostly of semi-professional sides. At the end of the season the nine league winners enter into a series of play-offs to earn the two promotion places in the National First Division. The bottom two teams in each league are relegated to the SAFA Regional League.

=== SAFA Regional League ===
The SAFA Regional League is the fourth tier of South African soccer, and the second highest tier controlled by the South African Football Association. The league is made up of 832 clubs, divided into 52 leagues. Each of the 52 leagues is associated with one of the nine provincial leagues in the SAFA Second Division, and are usually amateur teams. The regional league winners enter into a series of play-offs in their province, to gain two places in each provincial league in the SAFA Second Division.

=== LFA Soccer Leagues ===
Leagues below the SAFA Regional League are controlled by SAFA's Local Football Associations. The number of teams and leagues at this level can vary greatly depending on the area and the population. Teams in these leagues are almost always amateur.

=== Youth Soccer Leagues ===
There are several different youth soccer leagues, organised along geographic lines. The main youth competition is the U19 National League, run along local football association lines.

This league's main focus is to develop young talent at the different group ages in Gauteng province.

=== Tertiary Soccer ===
Most universities in South Africa include soccer programs for both men and women. Most clubs play in the amateur leagues, competing against non-university sides. The exception is in the Gauteng province, where clubs play in the Gauteng Football League.

The two largest university soccer tournaments are the USSA Football tournament and Varsity Sports Football Challenge. The USSA tournament is open to all universities, and allows separate teams for different campuses. The Varsity Sports tournament is only open to universities aligned to the University Sports Company, and only allows one club per university.

The University of the Witwatersrand formerly ran a club, Bidvest Wits, who competed in the South African Premier Division, and University of Pretoria runs a professional club, Tuks F.C., which play on their campuses and campaign in the National First Division. Maluti FET College F.C. competes in the SAFA Second Division.

=== Schools Soccer ===
There are also several leagues for high school and junior school soccer teams, however many private and former model C schools have chosen not to include soccer programs. One of the largest national schools soccer tournament is the Kay Motsepe Schools Cup.

=== Cup competitions ===
The Nedbank Cup is South Africa's main soccer cup, and is modeled on England's FA Cup. The cup is open to teams from the Premiership down to the SAB Regional Leagues.

The Telkom Knockout is the country's League Cup, and open only to Premiership teams.

The MTN 8 is a Super Cup and played between the top eight finishers from the previous season's Premiership.

The Baymed Cup is a defunct cup competition, which was open to National First Division teams.

== Main South African soccer clubs ==
South African soccer is dominated by the 'big three', Kaizer Chiefs, Mamelodi Sundowns and Orlando Pirates.

In 1995, Orlando Pirates became the first African soccer champions from South Africa after winning the 1995 African Cup of Champions Clubs. They lost the final of the continental tournament in 2013.

In 2001, Mamelodi Sundowns became the second South African soccer club in an African championship final. They won the 2016 CAF Champions League. As of 2025, Sundowns have won 15 league titles, including eight consecutive years since 2017–18.

Kaizer Chiefs reached the final of the 2020–21 CAF Champions League, making them the third South African soccer club in a continental championship final.

=== Club purchases and name changes ===
South African soccer has been heavily criticised for permitting consortiums or individuals to buy their way into the league. A number of iconic clubs have been sold, renamed, and relocated. This includes league winners Manning Rangers, Wits, Moroka Swallows, Bloemfontein Celtic and SuperSport United.

== National teams ==
=== Senior teams ===
The South Africa national team or Bafana Bafana (a Zulu term of endearment which means the boys, the boys) is the national team of South Africa and is controlled by the South African Football Association (SAFA). They returned to the world stage in 1992, after years of being banned by FIFA due to the apartheid system. The team has played at seven Africa Cup of Nations tournaments, winning once. The team has also played at three FIFA World Cups including, 1998 in France and 2002 in South Korea and Japan. South Africa became the first African nation to host the FIFA World Cup when it hosted the 19th FIFA World Cup in June 2010. The team's Siphiwe Tshabalala was also the first person to score in this World Cup during the opening game against Mexico. Despite defeating France 2–1 in their final game of the group stage, they failed to progress from the first round of the tournament, becoming the first host nation to do so. South Africa had participated in the FIFA Confederations Cup of 1997 and hosted in 2009. The team's highest achievement was winning the Africa Cup of Nations at home in 1996.

The men's development team is made up mainly of players from South Africa's lower leagues. The team plays matches in the COSAFA Cup and African Nations Championship.

The women's team has played at nine African Women's Championships and had a best finish of second place, which it accomplished four times, most recently in 2012. The team played at home during the 2010 African Women's Championship, and finished in third place, the third time South Africa has hosted the competition. South Africa made the FIFA Women's World Cup for the first time ever in 2019, ironically also in France, where the men's team made its debut 21 years ago.

=== Junior teams ===
There are three men's youth teams:

- Amaglug-glug (under 23)
- Amajita (under 20)
- Amajimbos (under 17)

and two women's youth teams:

- Basetsana (under 20)
- Bantwana (under 17)

== International tournaments ==
South Africa has hosted a number of large scale football tournaments. These include:

- 1994 COSAFA U-17 Cup
- 1996 African Cup of Nations
- 1999 All-Africa Games Football tournament
- 1999 COSAFA U-20 Cup
- 1999 UEFA–CAF Meridian Cup
- 2000 African Women's Championship
- 2000 COSAFA U-20 Cup
- 2001 COSAFA U-17 Cup
- 2001 COSAFA U-20 Cup
- 2002 COSAFA U-17 Cup
- 2002 COSAFA U-20 Cup
- 2003 COSAFA U-20 Cup
- 2004 African Women's Championship
- 2004 COSAFA U-20 Cup
- 2005 COSAFA U-20 Cup
- 2005 COSAFA Cup (co-host)
- 2006 COSAFA U-20 Cup
- 2007 COSAFA U-20 Cup
- 2007 COSAFA Cup (co-host)
- 2008 COSAFA U-20 Cup
- 2008 COSAFA Cup
- 2009 FIFA Confederations Cup
- 2009 COSAFA U-20 Cup
- 2010 FIFA World Cup
- 2010 African Women's Championship
- 2011 African Youth Championship
- 2013 Africa Cup of Nations
- 2014 African Nations Championship

== Support ==
Twitter research from 2015 found that the most popular English Premier League club in South Africa was Manchester United, with 23% of South African Premier League fans following the club, closely followed by Arsenal (21%) and Chelsea (18%).

== Attendances ==
The average attendance per top-flight football league season and the club with the highest average attendance:

Season	League average	Best club	Best club average
2018–19	7,299	Orlando Pirates	16,067
2017–18	6,689	Kaizer Chiefs	18,777
2016–17	5,078	Kaizer Chiefs	13,686
2015–16	6,634	Mamelodi Sundowns	12,834
2014–15	7,261	Kaizer Chiefs	15,312
2013–14	6,590	Kaizer Chiefs	18,470
2012–13	6,671	Kaizer Chiefs	17,821
2011–12	7,125	Orlando Pirates	16,482
