= AmaZulu F.C. =

South African association football club

AmaZulu
- Full name: AmaZulu Football Club
- Nicknames: Usuthu; Amaqhawe (Heroes)
- Founded: 1932; 94 years ago (as Zulu Royals)
- Ground: Moses Mabhida Stadium
- Capacity: 55,000
- Chairman: Sandile Zungu
- Coach: Arthur Zwane
- League: South African Premiership
- 2025–26: 4th of 16
- Website: www.amazulufc.net
Home colours	Away colours

Club crest of AmaZulu used until 2009

AmaZulu Football Club is a South African professional soccer club based in the city of Durban in the KwaZulu Natal province, that plays in the Premiership, the first tier of the South African football league system. The club's nickname, Usuthu, is the royal house of King Cetshwayo ka Mpande.

== History ==
=== Early history (1932–1973) ===
One of the oldest clubs in South Africa, AmaZulu was formed by Zulu migrant workers in 1932 and originally named Zulu Royal Conquerors. The club was then introduced to Zulu king Solomon, who changed the team's name to Zulu Royals and their colours to royal blue and white, and also added the shield to their logo.

Initially, Prince Bayisikili was placed as the team guardian at eMsizini and later replaced by Prince Sithela and the team's headquarter was at the eMbelebeleni Royal Kraal by then the team colours had changed to bottle green and white. On the day of King Bhekizulu's funeral in the year 1968, the team went to play a Cup game against SAPPI Homestars at eMandeni, which they lost 4–2. On the day of the funeral the club was supposed to escort the King's coffin but Mr. Shezi, Mr. Nsele, Mr. Magwaza ended up escorting the King wearing the team's uniform.

After that game an argument had broken up between the supporters of the club because some of them including Prince Sithela criticized the fact that, how could the team play a game on the day of the funeral of the Zulu King, when the team was supposed to mourn the King's death. The continuation of the argument led to Mr Gideon Sibiya and Mr. Ntuli who accompanied the club to eMandeni decided to take the club away from eMbelebeleni to eWema and then it was no longer recognized at the eMbelebeleni Royal Kraal.

At the end of 1970 the remaining committee members consisting of Mr Mkhize and Mr Ralph Mabaso decided to rebuild the team from scratch, recruited players, acquired a kit and appointed Mr Bethuel Masondo as the team manager. The committee went on to register the club as Zulu Royals United and Mr. Bethuel Masondo was the sole director. They decided to take the team back to eMbelebeleni Royal Kraal as its headquarters.

In 1971 a team called African Wanderers which was located in Kwa-Zulu Natal were experiencing problems while playing in the National Professional League (NPSL) which led the NPSL to take a decision that the Kwa-Zulu Natal Football Association must suspend African Wanderers from the NPSL and then recommend another team from Kwa-Zulu Natal to replace them. The Kwa-Zulu Natal Football Association then recommended the following teams: Union Jacks, Durban City All Black, Zulu Royals United or Young Dribblers.

The National Professional Soccer League (NPSL) at that time chairman, Mr RD Sishi, decided that Zulu Royal's United must replace African Wanderers in the NPSL because Zulu Royals was a team which represented the Zulu Nation from the Royal Kraal and that it has a support base more than the clubs that were recommended.

In 1971 Zulu Royals replaced African Wanderers and went on to finish 6th on the log and were voted club of the year. The following year in 1972 the club won the N.P.S.L league title securing 44 points from 26 matches and only losing 2 games.

In 1973 Zulu Royal suffered a huge set back when the then manager Mr. Bethwell Masondo left the club and took with him several prominent players which split the club. After this unfortunate incident the club went into a mid-season slump that would see them not being able to successful defend their league title. In 1974, the running of the club was taken over by the supporters and in the same year, the team changed to AmaZulu Football Club, a term which simple means "Zulu people." Some supporters led by Mr. Francis Dlamini who managed the reserve team decided to part ways with the reserve team to Bhekizulu hall and renamed back Zulu Royals United and its nickname were esikotshi". Other Directors that followed were Mr, Manana and Mr. Nxumalo who bought the team for R 4000.00, Mr. Merikan Madlala from Lamontville, then followed a committee made of Mr. Ngongoma, Mr. Duma, Mr. Mathe, Mr. Dlamini, Mr. Biyela and Nhleko.

=== The formation of the NSL and name changes (1985–2002) ===
In 1985 the National Soccer League was formed and AmaZulu entered a new phase of their history under the leadership of Mr. David Dlamini. In 1987, Clive Barker coached AmaZulu FC to finals of mainstay Cup and Iwisa Charity Cup, where they were narrowly defeated twice by Kaizer Chiefs. In 1990 the club reached the Bob Save Super Bowl final which they lost with a last minute goal against Jomo Cosmos, in 1992 the club won the inauguration Coca-Cola Cup and finished 3rd on the log in 1993.

After Mr. Dlamini then followed Spar Natal, Mr. Ncanana, Mr. Dan Naidoo, Mr. Mike Segal, Mr. Dave King after him was Mr Sisa Bikisha in 2002, who then changed the name AmaZulu F.C. to Zulu Royal. Amazulu were a British reggae/ska/pop band from the 1980s comprising five women and one man. They achieved success in the UK charts with four top-20 hits, the biggest being "Too Good to Be Forgotten" in 1986.

=== Sokhela ownership (2005–2020) ===
Logo from 2009 to 2025

In 2005, Dr Patrick Sokhela bought the team from Mr Sisa Bikisha, decided to revive the once mighty outfit of the Zulus by renaming the team back to AmaZulu Football Club. He and immediately bought the Premiership status of Dynamos to return the club to the top flight. To commemorate the club's 80th anniversary in 2012 AmaZulu played a friendly against English giants Manchester United on 18 July 2012 losing by a solitary goal scored by Federico Macheda.

AmaZulu was relegated in the 2014–15 season. After a failure to be promoted in the 2016–17 season they rejoined the Premiership by purchasing Thanda Royal Zulu's Premiership Status.

After purchasing their Premiership status, the team finished 7th in the 2017–18 season, however they were stripped of the Top 8 finish when Ajax Cape Town fielded Tendai Ndoro in matches against Platinum Stars, Polokwane City & Supersport United. This resulted in Ajax Cape Town losing all three matches 3–0 & fined R50 000 on each offence, and AmaZulu dropping to 9th position in the 2017–18 season.

On 28 September 2018 it was announced by the PSL that AmaZulu would be docked 6 points for failure to comply with a ruling made by the Court of Arbitration for Sport in September 2017. The matter surrounded the illegal termination of the contract of a former player, Phinheas Nambandi, in 2014 Nambandi took the club to FIFA to contest the termination of his contract, with FIFA ruling that the termination was illegal and that the club were to pay an amount of R1‚086,000.00. AmaZulu appealed the decision at the Court of Arbitration for Sport, however, the decision was upheld. A year later the club had still failed to pay the outstanding figure to Phinheas Nambandi, this resulted in FIFA's Disciplinary Committee ruling that should the club not settle the debt with the player by 16 September 2018, 6 points would be deducted.

The club had a turbulent 2019–20 season, with two coaches being fired and the club's Premiership status secured by the coaching combination of Ayanda Dlamini and Moeneeb Josephs. AmaZulu started the season poorly under Cavin Johnson and his assistant Alan Clark, with the team sitting on 2 points after 5 games. The decision was made by club management to fire the coaching duo, with Jozef Vukusic coming in as the club's new head coach. The team seemed to have turned a corner under Vukusic's mentorship, however, they started the second half of the season poorly and it was decided that change was needed in order to save the club from relegation. Vukusic was suspended, with assistant coach Ayanda Dlamini being given the role as interim head coach, and Moeneeb Josephs being installed as his assistant. Dlamini managed to save the club from relegation, with the team finishing 13th, and going undefeated in his 5 home games in charge. What made this achievement even more impressive is that the AmaZulu ownership had implemented salary cuts on all their staff, which they cited as being associated with the COVID-19 pandemic – this despite the fact that the club continued to receive its full monthly grant from the PSL. The club received backlash for the manner in which the salary cuts were handled from the SA Football Players' Union.

=== The Zungu era (2020–present) ===
On 2 October 2020, it was announced that businessman Sandile Zungu had purchased AmaZulu from Patrick Sokhela. From the outset, the new ownership laid out a 12-year plan that would see the club climb in stock and standing within South African football. As part of achieving this plan, Zungu brought in Benni McCarthy as Head Coach, with Siyabonga Nomvethe and McCarthy's former assistant from Cape Town City, Vasili Manousakis joining the club as assistant coaches – this saw the redeployment of Ayanda Dlamini to the club youth structures and the mutual termination of Allan Freese's contract. Further to this, Moeneeb Josephs was brought in as the new first team goalkeeper coach, replacing long term employee Davies Phiri; and, Justin Hamburger was brought in to join the Performance Analysis department alongside Pilela Maposa.

In his maiden season as the owner of AmaZulu, Sandile Zungu saw his team finish 2nd behind Mamelodi Sundowns and subsequently qualify for the 1st preliminary round of the CAF Champions League. The team beat Nyasa Big Bullets in the preliminary round with a 3-2 aggregate. AmaZulu progressed to the 2nd preliminary round facing African giants, TP Mazembe, with AmaZulu qualifying for the group stages of the competition after a 1-1 aggregate, going through on away goals. AmaZulu are the seventh team from South Africa to progress beyond the preliminary stages of Africa's showpiece club competition.

The club introduced a new logo in October 2025.

== Facilities ==
The club currently train and have their administrative offices at Moses Mabhida Stadium. The technical team have their offices based inside Prime Human Performance Institute. The club also utilizes the performance facilities at Prime.

The club plays their home games out of Moses Mabhida Stadium, which is based in Durban.

== Tertiary Institution Cooperation ==
The High-Performance Manager of AmaZulu, Joshua Smith, played a key role in the formation of an externship program with the University of KwaZulu-Natal Biokinetics, Sports and Leisure Science department in 2019. The link sees biokinetics and exercise science honours students from the university assist with AmaZulu youth training sessions and physical testing. The link between the two organisations enters its 4th year in 2022.

Further to their link with UKZN, it was announced on 15 December 2020 by AmaZulu's High-Performance Manager, Joshua Smith, that a formal link between Usuthu and the International Soccer Science and Performance Federation (ISSPF) had been finalized, with the ISSPF becoming the official educational partner of the team.

== Current squad ==
As of 17 November 2025

Note: Flags indicate national team as defined under FIFA eligibility rules; some limited exceptions apply. Players may hold more than one non-FIFA nationality.

No.	Pos.	Nation	Player
1	GK	RSA	Olwethu Mzimela
2	MF	RSA	Athini Maqokola
3	DF	RSA	Omega Mdaka
4	DF	NAM	Riaan Hanamub
5	DF	RSA	Keegan Allan
6	MF	RSA	Siyanda Hlangabeza
8	MF	RSA	Ben Motshwari
9	FW	RSA	Ryan Moon
11	FW	RSA	Andiswa Sithole
12	DF	RSA	Taariq Fielies
14	DF	RSA	Nkosikhona Radebe
15	DF	RSA	Mondli Mbanjwa
16	GK	RSA	Darren Johnson
17	MF	RSA	Liam Bern
18	MF	RSA	Rocco Rocha
19	MF	RSA	Siphamandla Zikhali
20	MF	RSA	Tebogo Mashigo

No.	Pos.	Nation	Player
21	FW	RSA	Thapelo Matlhoko
22	MF	RSA	Bayanda Thabede
23	FW	ZIM	Thandolwenkosi Ngwenya
24	GK	CIV	Wilfried Kouassi
25	DF	RSA	Wandile Dube
27	MF	RSA	Hendrick Ekstein
30	DF	RSA	Onke Ncama
33	DF	RSA	Keenan Phillips
35	DF	RSA	Asanda Mzobe
36	DF	RSA	Minenhle Ngcobo
37	FW	RSA	Thandanani Mhlongo
38	MF	RSA	Gape Moralo
42	DF	RSA	Sandile Mthethwa
45	FW	KEN	Moses Shumah
—	MF	RSA	Sphesihle Maduna
—	MF	RSA	Khomotjo Lekoloane

=== Players on loan ===
Note: Flags indicate national team as defined under FIFA eligibility rules; some limited exceptions apply. Players may hold more than one non-FIFA nationality.

No.	Pos.	Nation	Player

== Personnel ==
=== Head coach history ===
As of 17 Dec 2023

Name	Date Appointed	Date Dismissed	Time in office	Matches	Points per match
Pablo Franco Martin (Spain)	20 June 2023	1 October 2024	-	-	-
Ayanda Dlamini (South Africa) (Interim)	04 Apr 2023	1 June 2023	58 Days	6	0,83
Romain Folz (France)	09 Oct 2022	04 Apr 2023	177 Days	19	1,11
Brandon Truter (South Africa)	28 Mar 2022	06 Oct 2022	193 Days	18	1,56
Benni McCarthy (South Africa)	14 Dec 2020	25 March 2022	466 Days	60	1,52
Allan Freese (Interim) (South Africa)	7 Dec 2020	17 Dec 2020	11 Days	1	0
Ayanda Dlamini (South Africa)	4 Mar 2020	7 Dec 2020	275 Days	13	1,23
Jozef Vukušič (Slovakia)	17 Sept 2019	3 Mar 2020	168 Days	20	0,90
Cavin Johnson (South Africa)	8 Aug 2017	16 Sept 2019	769 Days	71	1,17
Joey Antipas (Zimbabwe)	1 Jul 2016	8 Aug 2017	403 Days	–	–
Delron Buckley (South Africa) (Interim)	18 Apr 2016	30 Jun 2016	73 Days	–	–
Steve Barker (South Africa)	23 Nov 2014	18 Apr 2016	512 Days	–	–
Wilfred Mugeyi (Zimbabwe) (Interim)	15 Oct 2014	22 Nov 2014	38 Days	5	0,20
Craig Rosslee (South Africa)	29 Nov 2012	15 Oct 2014	685 Days	57	1,25
Roger Palmgren (Sweden)	19 Sep 2011	26 Nov 2012	434 Days	41	1,24
Manqoba Mngqithi (South Africa)	1 Jul 2010	19 Sep 2011	445 Days	36	0,89
Neil Tovey (South Africa)	1 Jul 2009	28 Jun 2010	362 Days	33	1,27
Clive Barker (South Africa)	1 Jul 2007	30 Jun 2009	730 Days	59	1,27
Júlio César Leal (Brazil)	31 Jan 2007	30 Jun 2007	150 Days	–	–
Reggie Shelembe (South Africa) (Interim)	30 Nov 2006	30 Jan 2007	61 Days	7	1,00
Clive Barker (South Africa)	1 Jul 2006	29 Nov 2006	151 Days	10	0,6
Thabo Dladla (South Africa)	2005	–	–	–	–
Keagan Mumba (Zambia)	2004	2004	–	–	–
Walter Rautmann (Austria)	2003	–	–	–	–
Zipho Dlangalala (South Africa) & Thabo Dladla (South Africa) (Interim)	2003	2003	–	–	–
Joseph Mukeba (Democratic Republic of the Congo)	2003	2003	–	–	–
Ramadhan Nsanzurwimo (Burundi)	2003	2003	–	–	–
Neil Tovey (South Africa)	2001	2002	–	–	–
Eddie Lewis (England)	1999	2000	–	–	–
Gavin Lane (South Africa) (Interim)	1999	1999	–	–	–
Clive Barker (South Africa)	1997	1999	–	–	–
Eoin Hand (Republic of Ireland)	1993	1993	–	–	–
Clive Barker (South Africa)	1991	1993	–	–	–
Clive Barker (South Africa)	1986	1987	–	–	–
Clive Barker (South Africa)	1974	1976	–	–	–

== Club honours ==
=== League ===
National Professional Soccer League (first tier)

- Champions: 1972

First Division Coastal Stream (second tier)

- Winners: 2000–01, 2002–03

=== Cups ===
MTN 8

- Runners-up: 2022

Telkom Knockout

- Winners: 1992

Nedbank Cup

- Runners-up: 1972, 1973, 1974, 1987, 1990, 2009–10

=== Minor cups ===
- KwaZulu-Natal Premier's Cup:
  - Winners: 2018
- The Msunduzi Cup
  - Winners: 2019

== Club records ==
- Most starts: (South Africa) Julius Chirwa 244
- Most goals: (South Africa) Owen Nzimande 55
- Most capped player: (Zimbabwe) Francis Shonhai 13
- Most starts in a season: (South Africa) Archie Radebe 41 (1987)
- Most goals in a season: (South Africa) George Dearnaley 23 (1992)
- Record defeat: 1–8 vs (South Africa) SuperSport United (6/6/04, Premiership)
- Most points in a league season: 54 (2020/2021)
- Most consecutive wins: 6 (2026/2027)
- Longest undefeated run: 16 (2020/2021)

== League record ==
=== NPSL ===
- 1971 – 6th
- 1974 – 3rd
- 1978 – 16th
- 1979 – 12th
- 1980 – 12th
- 1981 – 15th
- 1982 – 16th (relegated)
- 1984 – 15th

=== NSL ===
- 1985 – 13th
- 1986 – 3rd
- 1987 – 5th
- 1988 – 15th
- 1989 – 11th
- 1990 – 14th
- 1991 – 18th
- 1992 – 15th
- 1993 – 3rd
- 1994 – 13th
- 1995 – 16th

=== Premiership ===
- 1996–97 – 14th
- 1997–98 – 15th
- 1998–99 – 14th)
- 1999–2000 – 17th (relegated)

=== National First Division ===
- 2000–01 – 1st (promoted)

=== Premiership ===
- 2001–02 – 17th (relegated)

=== National First Division ===
- 2002–03 – 1st (promoted)

=== Premiership ===
- 2003–04 – 16th (relegated)

=== National First Division ===
- 2004–05 – 6th
- 2005–06 – 8th (purchased Premiership status)

=== Premiership ===
- 2006–07 – 15th
- 2007–08 – 13th
- 2008–09 – 10th
- 2009–10 – 9th
- 2010–11 – 14th
- 2011–12 – 7th
- 2012–13 – 12th
- 2013–14 – 9th
- 2014–15 – 16th (relegated)

=== National First Division ===
- 2015–16 – 9th
- 2016–17 – 5th (purchased Premiership status)

=== Premiership ===
- 2017–18 – 9th
- 2018–19 – 11th
- 2019–20 – 13th
- 2020–21 – 2nd
- 2021–22 – 7th
- 2022–23 – 12th
- 2023–24 – 11th
- 2024–25 – 6th
- 2025–26 – 4th

=== CAF Champions League ===
- 2021/2022 - Qualified for group stages.

=== Cup record ===
==== MTN 8 ====
Season	Round	Opposition	Score
2022/2023	Final	Orlando Pirates F.C.	0:1
2021/2022	Quarter-Finals	Cape Town City F.C.	1:2
2012/2013	Quarter-Finals	Moroka Swallows F.C.	0:2
2009/2010	Semi-Finals	Lamontville Golden Arrows F.C.	1:4 (over two legs)

==== Carling Knockout Cup ====
Season	Round	Opposition	Score
2023/2024	Semi-Finals	TS Galaxy F.C.	2:3

==== Carling Black Label Cup ====
Season	Round	Opposition	Score
2022/2023	Semi-Finals	Mamelodi Sundowns F.C.	0:3

==== Telkom Knockout ====
Season	Round	Opposition	Score
2019/2020	First round	Mamelodi Sundowns F.C.	0:5
2018/2019	Quarter-Finals	Orlando Pirates F.C.	1:3 (AET)
2017/2018	First round	Kaizer Chiefs F.C.	0:3
2014/2015	Quarter-Finals	Mamelodi Sundowns F.C.	1:2 (AET)
2013/2014	First round	Free State Stars F.C.	0:2
2012/2013	Quarter-Finals	Mamelodi Sundowns F.C.	0:2
2011/2012	First round	Bidvest Wits F.C.	0:1
2010/2011	First round	Kaizer Chiefs F.C.	0:2
2009/2010	Semi-Finals	Ajax Cape Town F.C.	0:2
2008/2009	First round	SuperSport United F.C.	0:1
2008/2009	Quarter-Finals	Bloemfontein Celtic F.C.	0:1

==== Nedbank Cup ====
Season	Round	Opposition	Score
2023/2024	Quarter-Final	Orlando Pirates F.C.	2:4
2022/2023	Round of 16	Dondol Stars	4:5 (Penalty shootout)
2021/2022	Round of 32	Orlando Pirates F.C.	0:1
2020/2021	Round of 16	Black Leopards F.C.	0:1
2019/2020	Round of 32	Bloemfontein Celtic F.C.	1:4
2018/2019	Round of 32	Highlands Park F.C.	1:3 (Penalty shootout)
2017/2018	Round of 16	Ubuntu	2:3
2016/2017	Round of 32	Platinum Stars F.C.	2:3
2015/2016	Round of 32	Jomo Cosmos F.C.	3:4 (Penalty shootout)
2014/2015	Round of 32	Lamontville Golden Arrows F.C.	1:2
2013/2014	Round of 16	Bidvest Wits F.C.	1:4
2012/2013	Round of 32	Tembu Royals F.C.	1:2
2011/2012	Semi-Finals	SuperSport United F.C.	0:3
2010/2011	Quarter-Finals	Mpumalanga Black Aces F.C.	2:3
2009/2010	Final	Bidvest Wits F.C.	0:3
2008/2009	Round of 32	Black Leopards F.C.	0:1
2007/2008	Semi-Finals	Mamelodi Sundowns F.C.	0:1

== Shirt sponsor and kit manufacturer ==
- Shirt sponsor: Amandla Mobile
- Sleeve sponsor: Amstel Larger
- Kit manufacturer: Primo
