= Lusitano F.C. (South Africa) =

Lusitano
- Full name: Lusitano Football Club
- Founded: 1966
- Ground: Southern Surbs Sports Club, Johannesburg
- Capacity: N/A
Home colours	Away colours

Lusitano FC is a South African football (soccer) club based in Johannesburg that plays in the Vodacom League. They won the Castle Cup in 1977 as well as the 1978 NPSL First Division, the first season of the multi-racial top flight league, the National Professional Soccer League.

Their Lusitano's 13-0 victory over Mangaung United in their title-winning season is the largest margin of victory in a top-flight league game in South Africa.

== Former notable coaches ==
- (England) Eddie Lewis
- (Chile) Mario Tuani
- (Scotland) Joe Frickleton
- (England) Budgie Byrne
- (England) Frank Lord
- (Portugal) Fernando Mendes
- (Brazil) Walter Da Silva
- (Argentina) Oscar Gonzalez

== Honours ==
- 1969 NFL Third Division Champions
- 1972 NFL Second Division league Champions
- 1977 NFL First Division Runners Up
- 1977 Castle Cup winners
- 1978 NPSL First Division league Champions
- 1982 NFL First Division Runners Up
- 2006 Southern Gauteng Second Division league Champions
- 2009 Gauteng Vodacom league Champions

== See also ==
- National Football League (South Africa)
