= National Professional Soccer League (South Africa) =

Former South African association football league 1971 to 1995

NPSL First Division
- Founded: 1971
- Folded: 1995
- Country: South Africa
- Most championships: Kaizer Chiefs (5 times)

The National Professional Soccer League (NPSL) was a South African association football league that existed between 1971 and 1995. During those years, the league, however, had three completely different organisations.

== History ==
With sport racially segregated during the apartheid era, there had been attempts since 1969 to get a league for black teams underway, similar to the National Football League for white teams.

By January 1971, at the South African Bantu Football Association AGM, Orlando Pirates, Pimville United Brothers, Bantu Callies, Kimberley Dalton Brothers, Real Katlehong City, Witbank Black Aces, Moroka Swallows Big XV and a Mamelodi XI were committed to the new league.

With sponsorship secured, other clubs lined up to join, and there was talk of a second division. The league kicked off in April 1971 with a double-header at Orlando Stadium, and the success of the launch saw South African Breweries join as official sponsors.

=== 1971–1977 ===
Year	Winner	Runner-up	Third-place
NPSL Castle League (for blacks)
1971	Orlando Pirates	Kaizer Chiefs	Moroka Swallows Big XV
1972	AmaZulu		
1973	Orlando Pirates		
1974	Kaizer Chiefs	Moroka Swallows Ltd.	Zulu Royals
1975	Orlando Pirates		
1976	Orlando Pirates	Kaizer Chiefs	Moroka Swallows Ltd.
1977	Kaizer Chiefs		

=== 1978–1984 ===
In 1978, the NPSL merged with the National Football League (NFL), which previously had been organised only for White South African players in 1959–1977. The two leagues together formed a new topflight multi-racial football league in 1978–1984 (also named NPSL), where teams were still designated as white or black, but the white teams were allowed to field a maximum of three black players.

Year	Winner	Runner-up	Third-place
NPSL Castle League
1978	Lusitano	Wits University	Arcadia
1979	Kaizer Chiefs	Arcadia	Highlands Park
1980	Highlands Park	Kaizer Chiefs	Wits University
1981	Kaizer Chiefs	Highlands Park	Arcadia
1982	Durban City	Wits University	Kaizer Chiefs
1983	Durban City	Arcadia	Kaizer Chiefs
1984	Kaizer Chiefs	Moroka Swallows	Durban City

In January 1985, Kaizer Chiefs owner Kaizer Motaung lodged a complaint that it was unfair that 10% of revenue from a testimonial match for Ace Ntsoelengoe and Jomo Sono was expected to go to various administrative bodies including SANFA. Several clubs question the conflicts of interest for George Thabe to be the president of the NPLS and SANFA at the same time. Fifteen of the sixteen clubs petitioned for Thabe to resign as NPSL chairman and a proposal for constitution changes that remove SANFA’s veto rights over NPSL. On 29 January, Thabe told those clubs who wanted to him resign should leave the NPSL.

In February 1985, it was announced that the clubs wanting to break away had arranged sponsorship with South African Breweries, the existing sponsor of NPSL, and a newly created National Soccer League (NSL) would begin on 23 February in accordance with anti-apartheid principles.

=== 1985–1995 ===
The remaining part of the NPSL continued to co-exist as an independent league, meaning South Africa had three top division leagues; the NSL, the NPSL and the Federation Professional League (FPL). When the NPSL folded, the remaining teams played the following 1996–97 season in the NSL 2nd Division, renamed as the National First Division.

Year	Winner	Runner-up	Third-place
NPSL
1985	Umtata Bush Bucks		
1986	Vaal Professionals		
1987	Vaal Professionals		
1988	Vaal Professionals		
1989	Real Sweepers		
1990	De Beers		
1991	Oriental Spurs		
1992	Arcadia Shepherds		
1993	unknown		
1994	unknown		
1995	Witbank All Stars		

=== Most titles ===
Team	Titles	Years
Kaizer Chiefs	5	1974, 1977, 1979, 1981, 1984
Orlando Pirates	4	1971, 1973, 1975, 1976
Vaal Professionals	3	1986, 1987, 1988
Durban City	2	1982, 1983
AmaZulu	1	1972
Lusitano	1	1978
Highlands Park	1	1980
Bush Bucks	1	1985
De Beers	1	1990
Oriental Spurs	1	1991
Arcadia Shepherds	1	1992
Witbank All Stars	1	1995
