= Durban City F.C. =

South African association football club

Durban City Football Club
- Nicknames: Banana Boys, Golden Boys
- Founded: May 1959; 66 years ago
- Dissolved: 29 July 1988; 37 years ago
- Ground: New Kingsmead, Durban
- Owner: Norman Elliott
Home colours	Away colours	Third colours

Durban City was a South African association football club based in the city of Durban. Formed in 1959 by Norman Elliott, the club was dissolved in 1988.

== History ==
Durban City FC played in the newly formed whites only National Football League from 1959 to 1977, the team then moved over to the Federation Professional League for the 1978 season. The team moved again to the National Premier Soccer League, which later changed its name to the National Soccer League from 1979 to 1988.

The club was sold on 27 July 1988 midway through the season to a group of local businessmen from the KwaZulu-Natal area. The new owners kept the famous blue and white hoops but immediately changed the name to Natal United. The team got relegated at the end of that season and disbanded.

In the 1986–1987 season the club courted controversy by becoming the first South African football club to have a mascot. 'Barry' was a kudu with enlarged eyes and glasses and was sponsored by a local opticians.

== Notable coaches ==
- (England) Colin Addison
- (South Africa) Clive Barker
- (Scotland) Alf Boyd
- (England) Budgie Byrne
- (England) Joe Kirkup
- (England) Dave Sexton (guest)
- (England) Bill Williams
- (South Africa) Butch Webster
- (South Africa) Willie Lewis

== Honours ==
- FPL champions: 1978
- NPSL champions: 1982, 1983
