= African Wanderers F.C. =

South African football club

African Wanderers
- Full name: African Wanderers Football Club
- Nickname: Abaqulusi
- Founded: 1906
- Ground: SJ Smith Stadium, Chatsworth, Durban, KwaZulu-Natal, South Africa
- Capacity: N/A
- League: Vodacom League, Mpumalanga Province
- 2010-11 season: 13

African Wanderers is a South African professional football club, based in the Chatsworth township, a suburb of Durban in South Africa.

== History ==
Wanderers participated in the inaugural National Professional Soccer League in 1971. However, they were expelled after two months following an incident where two Wanderers teams arrived to play their fixture against Kimberley Dalton Brothers. One wearing red kit, the other white, police had to intervene to stop fighting between the two camps. Eventually five players from each squad (still wearing their respective red and white kits) were chosen to play (the origin of the eleventh player is not recorded), with the team winning 6-3. Further internal wrangling saw the team miss two fixtures before being expelled and replaced by Zulu Royals.

Wanderers continued as a club, winning the second tier and playing in the top tier NSL in 1995, being relegated in their first season. They bounced back to play in the 1997–98 Premiership, where they were again relegated immediately. Returning straight away after winning the 1998–99 Coastal Stream, they finished one position above the relegation zone in the 1999–2000 Premiership season before again being relegated, finishing bottom of the 2000–01 Premiership. They made a final appearance in the top tier in the 2002–03 Premiership before suffering a second consecutive relegation from the 2003–04 National First Division. They have since played in the amateur ranks.
