= Vaal Professionals F.C. =

Vaal Professionals
- Full name: Vaal Professionals
- Nicknames: Setla, Vaal Monsters
- Founded: 1930 Toplocation
- Ground: Vereeniging

Vaal Professionals was a South African soccer club. Based in Vereeniging, they were a founder member of the Premier Soccer League in 1996. They were nicknamed Setla or Vaal Monsters.

The club was relegated from the 1998–99 Premiership and then from the 1999–2000 National First Division the following season, before disbanding.

A team with the same name played in the Gauteng Stream of the SAFA Second Division, from 2016–17 to 2019–20, as well as 2021–22.

== Honours ==
- NPSL Champions: 3

1986, 1987, 1988

- Bob Save Super Bowl: 1

1994
