= Wenzhou people =

Han Chinese ethnic division

Wenzhou people 溫州人 uen tseu nyin
Total population
- ~8,000,000

Regions with significant populations
- China, Wenzhou (urban + rural areas): ~6,000,000 (natives)
- China: 1,700,000 (rest of country)
- Italy: 288,715 (90% of Chinese population)
- United States: 250,000 (2016)
- Spain: ~116,000 <70% (+ Qingtian)
- France: 60,000–100,000
- Taiwan: as part of the Waishengren population
- Australia: part of Chinese Australian population
- Netherlands: part of Chinese people in the Netherlands

Languages
- Wenzhounese, Zhenan Min, Standard Chinese, etc.

Religion
- Mahayana Buddhism, Taoism, Confucianism, Irreligion, Chinese folk religion and Christianity

Related ethnic groups
- Wu-speaking people, Min-speaking people, other Han Chinese

The Wenzhou people or Wenzhounese people are an ethnographic group native to Wenzhou, Zhejiang province, China, who mostly speak Wenzhounese, a variety of Wu Chinese.

Wenzhounese people are known for their business and money-making skills, and have also made notable contributions to mathematics and technology. There are Wenzhounese diaspora communities in Europe and the United States, with a reputation for being enterprising natives who start restaurants, retail and wholesale businesses in their adopted countries. About two-thirds of the overseas community is in Europe.

== History ==
Wenzhou was the home territory of the Dong'ou Kingdom, which had been conquered by the Minyue Kingdom and later by the Han dynasty.

The majority of people in Wenzhou are descendants of immigrants and about 80% came from Fujian province. From the Tang, Song to Ming and Qing dynasties, a great number of families in Fujian province immigrated to Wenzhou with all their family members.

== Culture ==
=== Language ===
Wenzhou natives speak a unique form of Wu Chinese called Wenzhou dialect. However, geographic isolation and an admixture of Southern Min Chinese speakers from nearby Fujian Province, have caused Wenzhou's spoken language to evolve into a dialect that is notable for its highly divergent phonology. As a result, even people from other regions of Zhejiang and Fujian both have trouble understanding Wenzhounese. The Taizhou dialect, located directly to the north, has little to no mutual intelligibility with Wenzhou. Many Wenzhou natives also speak a Southern Min dialect called Zhenan Min.

The Wenzhou dialect preserves a large amount of vocabulary of classical Chinese lost in most other Chinese dialects, earning itself the nickname "the living fossil", and has distinct grammatical differences from Mandarin.

Due to its high degree of eccentricity and difficulty for non-locals to understand, the language is reputed to have been used during the Second Sino-Japanese War during wartime communication as code talkers and in Sino-Vietnamese War for programming military code.

=== Opera ===
Nanxi is a form of Chinese opera developed in Wenzhou, which is the earliest form of traditional Chinese Opera in the history of China.

=== Philosophy ===
Wenzhou was home to the Yongjia School of thought, which emphasized pragmatism and commerce. This philosophy is thought to have been a forerunner to modern capitalism in the region.

=== People of Excellence and Land of Wisdom ===
There is a popular saying in China that reflects the status of the city of Wenzhou related to the Fengshui of Wenzhou which is "People of Excellence and Land of Wisdom"(人傑地靈), as the local Wenzhounese people are usually described in China as the people of excellence and the city of Wenzhou is usually praised as the city of wisdom.

=== Birthplace of China's private economy ===
In the early days of economic reforms, local Wenzhounese took the lead in China in developing a commodity economy, household industries and specialized markets. Many thousands of people and families were engaged in household manufacturing to develop individual and private economy (private enterprise). Up till now, Wenzhou has a total of 240,000 individually owned commercial and industrial units and 130,000 private enterprises of which 180 are group companies, 4 among China's top 500 enterprises and 36 among national 500 top private enterprises. There are 27 national production bases such as "China’s Shoes Capital" and "China’s Capital of Electrical Equipment", China's 40 famous trademarks and China's famous-brand products and 67 national inspection-exempt products in the city. The development of private economy in Wenzhou has created the "Wenzhou Economic Model", which inspires the modernization drive in China.

=== Education ===
As of 2010, 650,300 people in Wenzhou hold a college degree; 1,150,400 people hold a high school degree; 3,344,400 people hold a middle school degree; 2,679,900 people hold an elementary school degree. In every 100,000 people in Wenzhou, 7128 people hold a college degree; 12611 people hold a high school degree; 36663 people hold a middle school degree and 29379 people hold an elementary school degree. The population of illiterate people in Wenzhou is 645,100, which is 7.07% of its whole population.

== Regions ==
=== Wenzhou ===
At the time of the 2010 Chinese census, 3,039,500 people lived in Wenzhou's city proper; the area under its jurisdiction (which includes two satellite cities and six counties) held a population of 9,122,100 of which 31.16% are non-local residents from outside of Wenzhou.

=== Rest of mainland China ===
There are around 1.7 million Wenzhounese people living in other parts of the country. In major cities such as Beijing or Shanghai there are "Zhejiang villages", enclaves where people from Wenzhou reside and do business.

=== Italy ===
In 2010, an analysis conducted by the CESNUR and the University of Turin on the 4,000-strong Chinese community of Turin showed that at that time, 48% of this community was women and 30%, minors. Most of the Chinese in Italy—and virtually all of the Turin community—hail from the southeastern Chinese province of Zhejiang, primarily the city of Wenzhou. The community in Turin is younger than other Chinese settlements in Italy, and for this reason it depends as a branch of the community of Milan. Approximately 70% of the Chinese in Turin work in restaurant activity, and more than 20% work in commercial activity.

Prato, Tuscany has the largest concentration of Chinese people in Italy, and all of Europe. It has the second largest population of Chinese people overall in Italy, after Milan.

=== The Netherlands ===
The Netherlands currently has the third largest population of Wenzhounese in Europe.

=== Spain ===
About 70% of the Chinese people in Spain are from Wenzhou or Qingtian.

=== United States ===
Wenzhou people in the United States are mostly concentrated on the East Coast, particularly around the New York City metropolitan area. Many Wenzhou people are owners of Chinese restaurants. They are the second largest group of Chinese undocumented immigrants in the United States, after Fuzhounese people. The total Wenzhou population in the US was estimated to be around 250,000 in 2016.

=== Japan ===
Japan was the destination for many Wenzhounese migrants in the beginning of the 20th century, however many of them returned following the rise of anti-foreign sentiment and ultimately the outbreak of the second Sino-Japanese War.

== Notable Wenzhounese people ==
=== Mathematicians ===
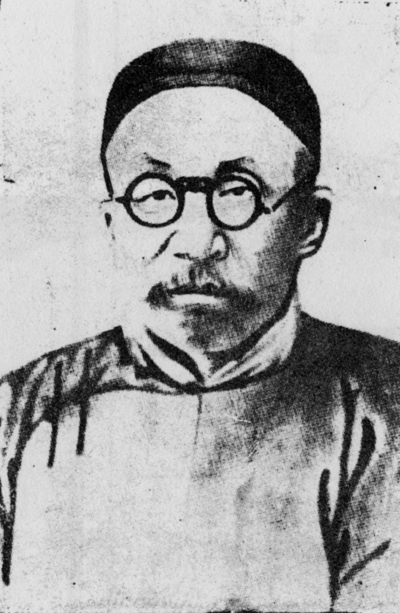
Sun Yirang, famous mathematician and oracle bones translator.

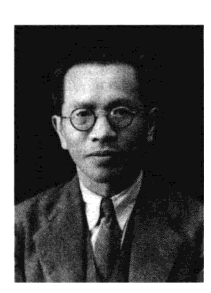
Jiang Lifu, father of mathematics in modern China.
- Sun Yirang (1848–1908), pioneer of decipherment of oracle bone script, founder of the first mathematical academy in the history of China, mentor of Huang Qingcheng
- Huang Qingcheng (黄庆澄; 1863–1904), uncle of Jiang Lifu, founder of the first periodical of mathematics in the history of China, student of Sun Yirang
- Jiang Lifu (1890–1978), father of mathematics in modern China, first president of Academia Sinica of Mathematics, mentor of Su Buqing, Shiing-Shen Chern, Hua Luogeng, father of Jiang Boju, nephew and student of Huang Qingcheng
- Su Buqing (1902–2003), mathematician, president and honorary president of Fudan University, honorary chairman of the Chinese Mathematical Society, first geometer in the Orient, renowned as "King of Math" in China, student of Jiang Lifu
- Shu Shien-Siu (1912—2002), former prime minister of Ministry of Science and Technology of Republic of China, president of National Tsing Hua University, father of Hsinchu Science and Industrial Park, renowned as the father of high-tech industry in Taiwan
- Chung Tao Yang (1923–2005), chair of the Department of Mathematics at University of Pennsylvania from 1978 to 1983, student of Su Buqing
- Gu Chaohao (1926–2012), vice president of Fudan University, president of University of Science and Technology of China, student of Su Buqing, Bai Zhengguo
- Wu-Chung Hsiang (1935–), chair of the Department of Mathematics at Princeton University from 1982 to 1985, son of Xiang Changquan
- Jiang Boju (1937–), first president of School of Mathematical Sciences at Peking University, former chairman of Beijing Mathematical Society, son of Jiang Lifu
- T. Tony Cai (1967–), 2008 COPSS Presidents' Award winner, Dorothy Silberberg professor at Wharton School of the University of Pennsylvania

=== Champions of board games ===
- Ye Rongguang (1963–), first ever grandmaster of chess in the history of China
- Zhu Chen (诸宸; 1976–), chess grandmaster and women's world champion
- Ding Liren (1992–), chess grandmaster, ranked first in China and third in the world (as of April 2019). Current World Chess Champion (as of January 2024).

=== Academicians ===
- Wang Xizhi (303–361), sage of Chinese calligraphy
- Xie Lingyun (Duke of Kangle) (385–433), poet, founder of landscape poetry in China
- Ye Shi (1150–1223), philosopher, most important figure of the neo-Confucianism Yongjia School
- Cheng Man-ch'ing (1902–1975), tai chi master, calligrapher, painter, poet, doctor of Chinese medicine, called the "Master of Five Excellences"
- Xia Nai (1910–1985), archaeologist, pioneer of archaeology in modern China, one of the most honored scholars in archaeology
- Chen Cheng-siang (1922–2003), first prominent geographer in the history of China, one of the most prominent geographers in the world, renowned as the Alexander von Humboldt of the Orient
- Frank Shu (1943–2023), chair of astronomy department of University of California, Berkeley from 1984 to 1988, former president of American Astronomical Society, president of National Tsing Hua University, son of Shu Shien-Siu
- Shen Zhixun (1962–), one of the pioneers in materials physics, winner of E.O. Lawrence Award, Advisor for Science and Technology of SLAC National Accelerator Laboratory
- Wu Zhaohui (1966–), educator, president of Zhejiang University

=== Politicians ===
- Liu Ji 刘基 (1311–1375), founding father of Ming dynasty alongside founding emperor Zhu Yuanzhang, renowned as the Divine Chinese Nostradamus, author of Shaobing Song
- Ni Wenya 倪文亚(1902–2006), former president of the Legislative Yuan of the Republic of China
- Jean Ping 让平 (1942–), former Chairperson of the Commission of the African Union, former President of the United Nations General Assembly, son of Wenzhounese businessman Cheng Zhiping
- Wu Qidi 吴启迪 (1947–), educator, former vice prime minister of Ministry of Education of the People's Republic of China, former president of Tongji University, first collegiate president appointed through election in the history of China
- Li Qiang 李强 (1959–), Premier of the State Council of the People's Republic of China, former Secretary of Shanghai Municipal Committee of the Chinese Communist Party, and former Governor of the Zhejiang Provincial People's Government

=== Economy ===
- Nina Wang 龚如心 (1937–2007), billionaire, businesswoman, former Asia and Hong Kong's richest woman, founder of Nina Tower, wife of Teddy Wang
- Kung Yan-sum 龚仁心 (1942–), billionaire, brother of Nina Wang, chairman of Chinachem Group, one of the biggest property developers in Hong Kong
- Jason Chang 张虔生 (1944–), billionaire, founder and president of ASE Group, the world's largest provider of independent semiconductor manufacturing services
- Lin Jianhai 林建海(1955–), economist, secretary-general of International Monetary Fund
- Nita Ing (Yin Qi) 殷琪 (1955–), business magnate, billionaire, first lady of construction business in Taiwan, president of Continental Engineering Corporation
- James Chu 朱家良 (1957–), founder and president of Viewsonic, world's first-ever manufacturer of Smart Display
- Wu Xiaohui 吴小晖 (1966–), owner of Waldorf Astoria New York, founder and CEO of China's second biggest insurance group, Anbang Insurance Group

=== Others ===
- Yongjia Xuanjue 永嘉玄觉 (655–713), Chán master, Tiantai Buddhist monk, author of the Song of Enlightenment
- Zeng Liansong 曾联松 (1917–1999), creator of Flag of the People's Republic of China
- Nan Huai-Chin 南怀瑾 (1918–2012), spiritual teacher of contemporary China, most important figure of Chinese Buddhism in modern China
- Feng Zhenghu 冯正虎 (1954–), economist, activist, reputed as the "prominent human rights defender" in China
- Zhou Yun (1978–) 周韵, main actress in Let the Bullets Fly and The Assassin
- Tang Wei 汤唯 (1982–), actress, main actress in Lust, Caution
- Ho-Pin Tung 董荷斌 (1982–), first Formula 1 racer in the history of China
- Zhu Qinan 朱启南 (1984–), Games of the XXVIII Olympiad Gold Medalist in sport shooting
- Sui He (1989–) 何穗, supermodel, first Asian face of Shiseido, first Asian model to open a Ralph Lauren runway show, Victoria's Secret fashion model
- Dong Sicheng (1997–) 董思成, member of Korean idol group NCT
- Estelle Chen (Chen Yu) (1998–) 陈瑜, only Asian model in Dior Haute Couture 2015/2016
- Huang Minghao (Justin Huang) (2002–) 黄明昊, singer, main piece in Produce 101
- Pan Zhanle (2004-) 潘展乐, Olympic champion, and current world record holder of the 100 metre freestyle event
