= Kung Yan-sum =

- Born: 1943 (age 82–83); Shanghai, Republic of China
- Occupation: Chairman of Chinachem Group
- Predecessor: Nina Wang
- Relatives: Nina Wang (sister); Teddy Wang (brother-in-law)

Kung Yan-sum
- Traditional Chinese: 龔仁心
- Simplified Chinese: 龚仁心
Transcriptions
Standard Mandarin
- Hanyu Pinyin: Gōng Rénxīn
- Wade–Giles: Kung Jen-hsin
Yue: Cantonese
- Jyutping: Kung1 Yan4 Sum1

Dr. Kung Yan-sum (Chinese: 龔仁心; born in 1943 in Shanghai) is the younger brother of the late Nina Wang, who used to be Asia's richest woman and the chairman of Chinachem Group, one of the biggest privately held property developers in Hong Kong. He is a doctor with a private clinic in Hong Kong Garden, Tsing Lung Tau, Tsuen Wan.

Since his sister's death in 2007, he has been temporarily in charge of managing Chinachem Group and as the chairman of the Chinachem Charitable Foundation. He is representing Chinachem Group in a legal battle against Tony Chan Chun Chuen, a Feng shui master who claimed he was the sole beneficiary of Nina's fortune.
