= List of Shanghainese and Lower Yangtze people in Hong Kong =

== Politics ==
- Tanya Chan (born 1971 in Hong Kong), politician
- Audrey Eu (born 1953 in Hong Kong), politician
- Tung Chee-hwa, Chief Secretary for Administration
- Anson Chan, Hong Kong Chief Secretary, her father Fang Shin-hau was a banker and textile businessman who moved his family to the British colony of Hong Kong in 1948
- Yang Ti-liang, former Chief Justice
- Rita Fan, politician, daughter of Hsu Ta Tung
- Carrie Lam (born 1957 in Hong Kong), HKSAR Chief Executive, ancestry in Zhoushan
- Richard Lai, (1946 in Shanghai – 2008), politician, former member of the Legislative Council of Hong Kong, born to a family doing jewellery and property business before he moved to Hong Kong in 1950
- Denny Huang (born in Shanghai, 1920), politician
- Ann Tse-kai (born in Shanghai 1912 - 2000) a Hong Kong industrialist, legislator and sinologist.
- Cheng Kai-nam

== Literature ==
- Claire Chao (born 1962 in Hong Kong), author
- Liu Yichang (born 1918 in Shanghai – 2018), or Lau Yee Cheung in Cantonese, writer, editor and publisher. He is considered the founder of Hong Kong's modern literature, ancestry in Zhenhai, Ningbo
- Ni Kuang (born in Ningbo), novelist
- Jin Yong (Louis Cha Leung-yung, born in Haining, Zhejiang), novelist
- Yi Shu (Isabel Nee Yeh-Su, born in Shanghai), novelist, sister of Ni Kuang

== Entertainment ==
- Edison Chen (born 1980 in Canada), actor and singer
- Kelly Chen (born 1973 in Hong Kong), actor and singer
- Joyce Cheng (born 1987 in Canada), actor, the daughter of Lydia Shum
- Jacky Cheung (born 1961 in Hong Kong), singer, one of the "Four Heavenly Kings" of Cantopop"
- Maggie Cheung (born 1964 in Hong Kong)
- Deacon Chiu (born 1924 in Shanghai – 2015)
- Niki Chow (born 1979 in Hong Kong), actress
- David Chu (born 1944 in Hong Kong)
- Judy Dan (born 1930 in Shanghai), actress
- Betty Loh Ti, born as Hsi Chung-i on 24 July 1937 into a prominent family from Pudong, the owner of the Xi Fu Ji (奚福記) Factory in Shanghai.
- Jan Lamb, (born 1967) DJ, singer, and actor his father was a Shanghainese suit maker. brother of Jerry Lamb
- Li Ching (actress) (1948 in Shanghai – 2018) as Li Guoying (Chinese: 李國瑛),
- Kelly Lai Chen (born Hsi Chungchien in Shanghai 1933 – 2018) was actor who appeared in more than 40 films in the 1950s and 1960s, and was best known for his portrayals of sensitive young men
- Teresa Carpio, Filipino father and Shanghainese mother
- Jackson Wang (born 1994 in Hong Kong), singer and rapper based in South Korea
- Tracy Ip (born 1981 in Hong Kong), actor and beauty pageant contestant
- Lydia Shum (born 1945 in Shanghai – 2008), actress and comedian ancestry in Ningbo

== Business ==
- Hsu Ta Tung, business magnate, father of Rita Fan
- Morris Chang (born 1931 in Ningbo), founder of Taiwan Semiconductor Manufacturing Company (TSMC), lived in Hong Kong intermittently during his childhood
- Vincent Fang, (born 1943 in Shanghai), the leader of the Liberal Party of Hong Kong. He is a Hong Kong entrepreneur in the garment industry
- Kenneth Fang (1938 in Shanghai - 2022), billionaire businessman and philanthropist, nicknamed the “King of Textiles”
- Z.Y. Fu (1919 in Shanghai - 2011), Chinese-American businessman
- Tao Ho (1936 in Shanghai – 2019) architect, he was the designer of the Bauhinia emblem, ancestry in Guangdong
- Norman Hsu, (1951 in Hong Kong – 2019) American businessman who is a convicted pyramid investment promoter
- Kung Yan-sum, (born 1943 in Shanghai), is the younger brother of Nina Wang Kung Yu-sum, the former Asia's richest woman and the late chairman of Chinachem Group, one of the biggest privately held property developer in Hong Kong.
- Nina Wang, born Kung Yu Sum (Chinese: 龔如心; pinyin: Gōng Rúxīn) 1936 – 2007) was Asia's richest woman, with an estimated net worth of US$4.2 billion at the time of her death.
- Teddy Wang, (born 1933 Shanghai -?) Chinese businessman and founder of the Chinachem Group who was kidnapped for ransom in 1990, and later declared legally dead. Ancestry in to Wenzhou.
- Henry Fan (born 1948 in Shanghai), executive at Cathay Pacific, Ningbo ancestry
- David Shou-Yeh Wong (born c. 1941 Ningbo), billionaire banker and philanthropist, founder Dah Sing Bank Limited.
- Kwok family of the Wing On Group
- Yue-Kong Pao (born 1918 in Ningbo – 1991), shipping magnate
- Frank Tsao (born 1925 in Shanghai), shipping magnate (International Maritime Carriers [IMC Group]) and financier who later settled in Singapore. Tsao lived in Hong Kong for a few years after leaving mainland
- Tang Ping Yuan (born 1898 in Wuxi – 1971) a Hong Kong textile entrepreneur and politician.
- Y.L. Yang (Yang Yuanlong born in Shanghai), eminent textile industry figure, Wu County descent
- Peter Woo Kwong-ching (born in Shanghai), Former chairman of Wheelock and Company Limited and The Wharf Holdings Limited, Ningbo descent
- Douglas Woo, son of Peter Woo
- Chao Kuang Piu, Shanghai-born textile and later airline magnate, ancestry in Yin County, Ningbo
  - Silas Chou, fashion businessman, early investor in Michael Kors
  - Susana Chou, is a Macau politician who served as the President of the Legislative Assembly of Macau
    - Veronica Chou

== Other ==
- Joseph Zen (born in Shanghai)
- Francis Hsu (1920, Shanghai – 1973), first Chinese bishop of the Roman Catholic Dioceses of Hong Kong
- Andrew Gih (1901 in Shanghai–February 13, 1985) was a Chinese Protestant evangelist who cofounded the Bethel Worldwide Evangelistic Band in 1931 and founded the Evangelize China Fellowship in 1947,
- Du Yuesheng (born 1888 in Shanghai – 1951), triad leader
- Victor Dzau (born 1945 in Shanghai), scientist
- Charles K. Kao (1933 in Shanghai – 2018) Nobel Laureate electrical engineer and physicist who pioneered the development and use of fibre optics in telecommunications, ancestry in Jinshan
- Michele Reis (born 1970 in Hong Kong), Eurasian of Shanghainese descent through her mother.
- Yuan Gongyi (born 1949 in Shanghai), businessman and pro-democracy activist.
