= Yongjia =

Yongjia or Yung-chia may refer to:

- The former name for Wenzhou, a city in Zhejiang, China. Earliest usage of Wenzhou name began in about 760 AD; Yongjia name usage has continued.
- Yongjia County, in Zhejiang, China
- Yongjia School, Chinese school of thought during the Song dynasty
- Yongjia Xuanjue, a Zen monk during the Tang dynasty
- Yongjia (brachiopod), a brachiopod genus.
- Disaster of Yongjia (Chinese: 永嘉之乱) referred to events that occurred in 311 CE, when Wu Hu forces captured and sacked Luoyang, the Jin capital
