= Chen Fuliang =

Chen Fuliang (陳傅良) (1137–1203) was a Chinese historian, academician, and philosopher. He was known by the courtesy name Junju (君舉) and had a style name of Zhizhai Xiansheng (止齋先生). He was part of the Yongjia School of the early Southern Song dynasty (1127–1279).

As a direct disciple of Xue Jixuan and mentor to Ye Shi, he was influential in spreading the Yongjia learning. He focused on the restoration of North China and believed that institutional reform was essential to regain national power and recover lands taken by the Jurchen Jin. In his teachings, he emphasized history as a way to address current social issues rather than just for ethical development.

He also conducted extensive research on history and institutional evolution, through which he offered unique ideas on military systems, tax reduction, land reforms, and government operations. His focus on institutional changes solidified his status in the Yongjia School and was his main contribution to the school of thought.

== Biography ==
Chen Fuliang came from Wenzhou (modern Rui'an, Zhejiang) from a deprived family. By age nine, he was orphaned and mostly raised by his grandmother. Pressured by his poverty, Chen earned a living by teaching. He entered a state university and made acquaintance with the scholar Zhang Shi and writer and philosopher Lu Zuqian (1137–1181).

He earned his jinshi degree in 1172 and held various important government positions, starting at Taixue serving as a gentleman for attendance. He then became the controller-general of Fuzhou, however due to conflict with the wealthy families in the area, resigned and spent his living as a teacher for the next seven years. From 1184 onwards, Chen served in different posts such as becoming military prefect of Guiyang, judicial commissioner in the Circuit of Zhexi, examining editor at the True Records Institute, Vice Director of the Palace Library, as well as serving as houseman and expositor-in-waiting in the Palace Secretariat. He was also an auxiliary Hanlin academician and an edict attendant (daizhi) in the Hall for Treasuring the Heritage (寶謨閣).

Despite his philosophical differences with Zhu Xi, Chen had wrote to Emperor Ningzong urging him to reverse the decision of Zhu's dismissal from government office in 1194. As a result, he also lost his office. He then returned home in Ruian and died in 1203.

== Philosophy ==
Chen was a student of Xue Jixuan (1134–1173) and mentor and follower of Ye Shi (1150–1223).

=== Education ===
During the Southern Song period, the structure of the civil examination system stayed mostly the same after its expansion to recruit officials during the reign of Emperor Taizong. During this period, there were disagreements among scholars and intellectuals about the content that should be included in the examinations. Chen, along with Ye Shi, advocated using history and classical learning to guide writing on government policies and issues. However, they faced opposition from the Chinese Confucian philosopher Zhu Xi and his followers, who argued that moral character is more valuable and should come from deep reading of the Four Books and engaging in deep inner reflection for self-cultivation.

=== Governance ===
Chen had used the Confucian Classics and history to develop his own practical political philosophy for his role as an administrator in the Southern Song dynasty. He was influenced by the ideas of the "human way" (ren dao) and "human affairs" (ren shi), which he believed should guide honest officials. He thought it was the government's duty to regain control of the Yellow River plain, an important area lost to the Jurchen Jin. To reclaim the north, the government needed to unite the "people's hearts" and ease their burdens, including reducing taxes.

The rulers for whom it is easy to achieve world peace are also more inclined to conform to popular support, and the rulers for whom it is difficult to see world peace are bound to be difficult to cope with the people's hearts well. So the wise monarch is not afraid of the powerful enemy of expansion, but deeply afraid of being unaware of the estrangement from popular support.

— Chen Fuliang, "The Memorial to the Throne" from the Collection of Mr. Zhizhai's Works

He believed that practical changes were necessary in administration to achieve success. He reinterpreted the Classics to argue that good governance relies on strong checks and balances between different institutions, such as public and private realms as well as military and economic resources. His own developed constitutional theory had contributed to shift the understanding of a good government focused on "wealth and power" (fuqiang) to one that is centered on "governance and stability" (zhi’an). Chen supported the practical ideas of Chen Liang in a debate with Zhu Xi about the moral responsibilities of rulers.

=== Fiscal decentralization ===
The principle of laissez faire advocates for wealth distribution beyond government control, opposing fiscal centralization. Both Ye Shi and Chen upheld this view. Chen stressed that fiscal management should be free from court demands and outside authority interventions, warning against concentrated power in one entity. He believed that to fairly distribute economic resources, the central government must prevent absolute authority and clearly define the roles in fiscal management. Specifically, he stated that it is the bureaucratic army's responsibility to manage wealth, with the Grand Minister overseeing savings. For Chen, the bureaucratic system should also be designed to prevent any one official, including the Grand Minister, from overstepping their authority and infringing on the rights of others. Chen referenced the Qin and Han dynasty as negative examples, noting that since the Qin dynasty, state income was effectively private wealth for the emperor, undermining broader economic access.

Since the Qin exhaustively extracted the wealth and tributes of all-under-heaven to assign them to the emperor, all products of mountains, marshes, hills and ponds came to be privately stored for the Son of Heaven. In the institutions of the Han, they belong to the Chamberlain for the Palace Revenues in the service of the Son of Heaven...

— Chen Fuliang, Zhouli dingyi

== Historiography ==
Chen Fuliang built on Lu Zuqian's research methods for interpreting the Zuo Zhuan and developed a guideline called the "Penetration of Worldly Changes" (通世變) from the Yongjia School. In his work Chunqiu Houzhuan (Later Commentary on Spring and Autumn Annals), he used these guidelines to narrate and interpret events from the Spring and Autumn Period, focusing on clarifying textual differences in the Chunqiu and studying the praises and criticisms made with regards to this chronicle. Using this approach, he continued the tradition of interpreting the Classics from the Han Dynasty while reflecting the unique academic style of the Yongjia School. He was noted to be dissatisfied with Neo-Confucian scholars who emphasized metaphysical concepts such as the idea of "heavenly principles vs. human desires". Instead, he focused on understanding the Chunqiu through practical changes in the world.

By addressing the problematic interpretations of the Cheng Sect, his ideas became widely accepted and helped improve his reputation in academia.

== Works ==
- Chunqiu houzhuan (春秋後傳), 12 volumes
- Lunzu (論祖), 4 volumes
- Aolun (奥論), 5 volumes
- Zhizhai wenji (止齋文集) collected writings which still exists in 52 volumes
- Military System of Past Dynasties, 8 volumes – Also known as Lidai bingzhi (歷代兵制), this military treatise details the military systems from the Han dynasty period through the Northern Song dynasty period.
- Mr. Yongjia's Eight Faces, 13 volumes

Chen also wrote articles for the imperial examinations.
