= Tony Chan =

Tony Chan may refer to:

- Tony Chan (businessman) (born 1959), Hong Kong businessman and geomancer
- Tony F. Chan, mathematician and the president of King Abdullah University of Science and Technology (KAUST)
- Antonio Canale, Italian comic writer and artist, also known under the pen name Tony Chan
