= Hong Kong Garden =

Hong Kong Garden may refer to:

- Hong Kong Garden (Hong Kong), private housing estate in Hong Kong
- Hong Kong Garden (song), 1978 song by Siouxsie and the Banshees
