= Tsing Lung Tau =

Coastal residential area in Hong Kong

Coordinates: 22°21′45″N 114°02′46″E

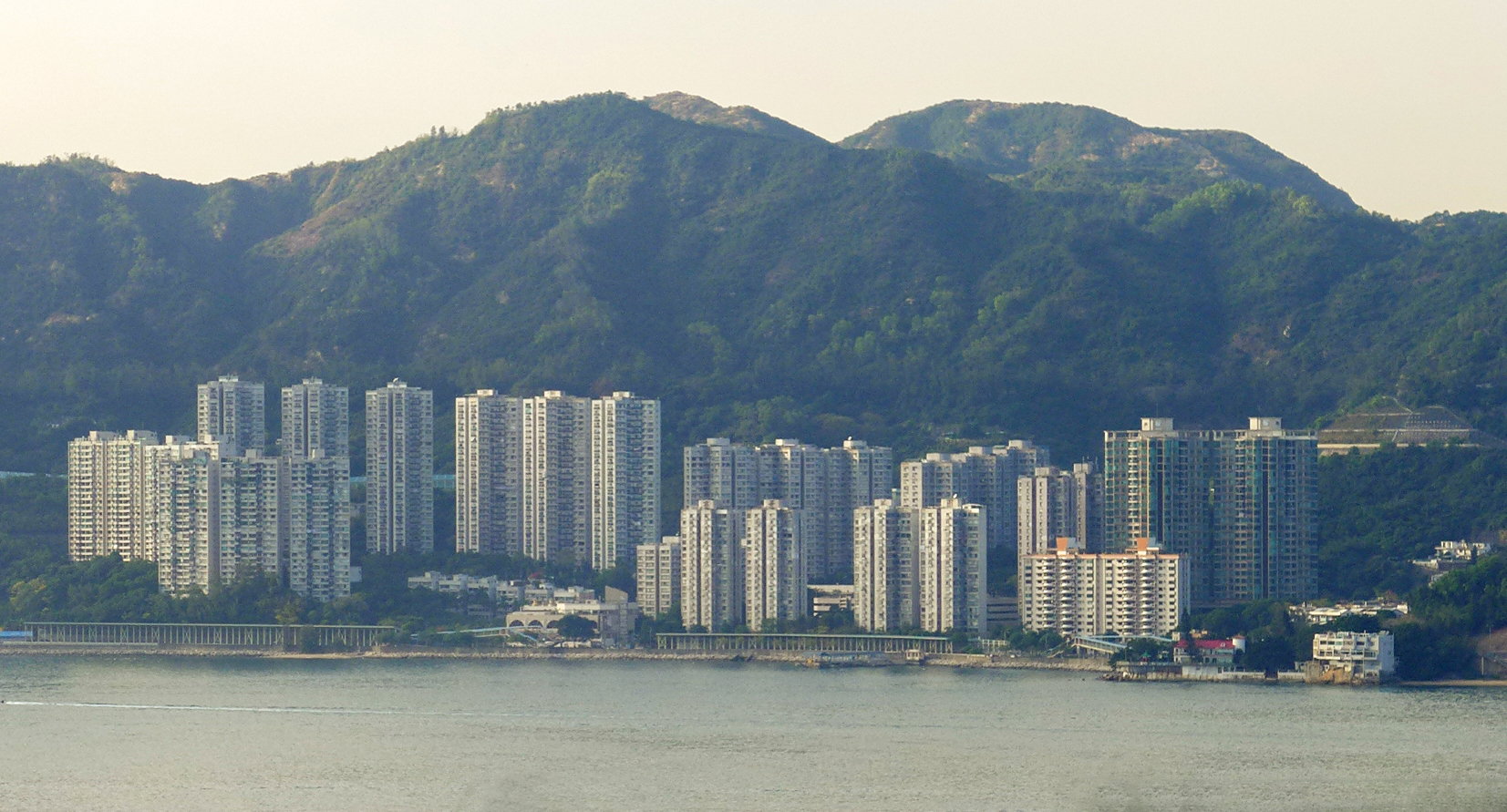
Skyline of Tsing Lung Tau.

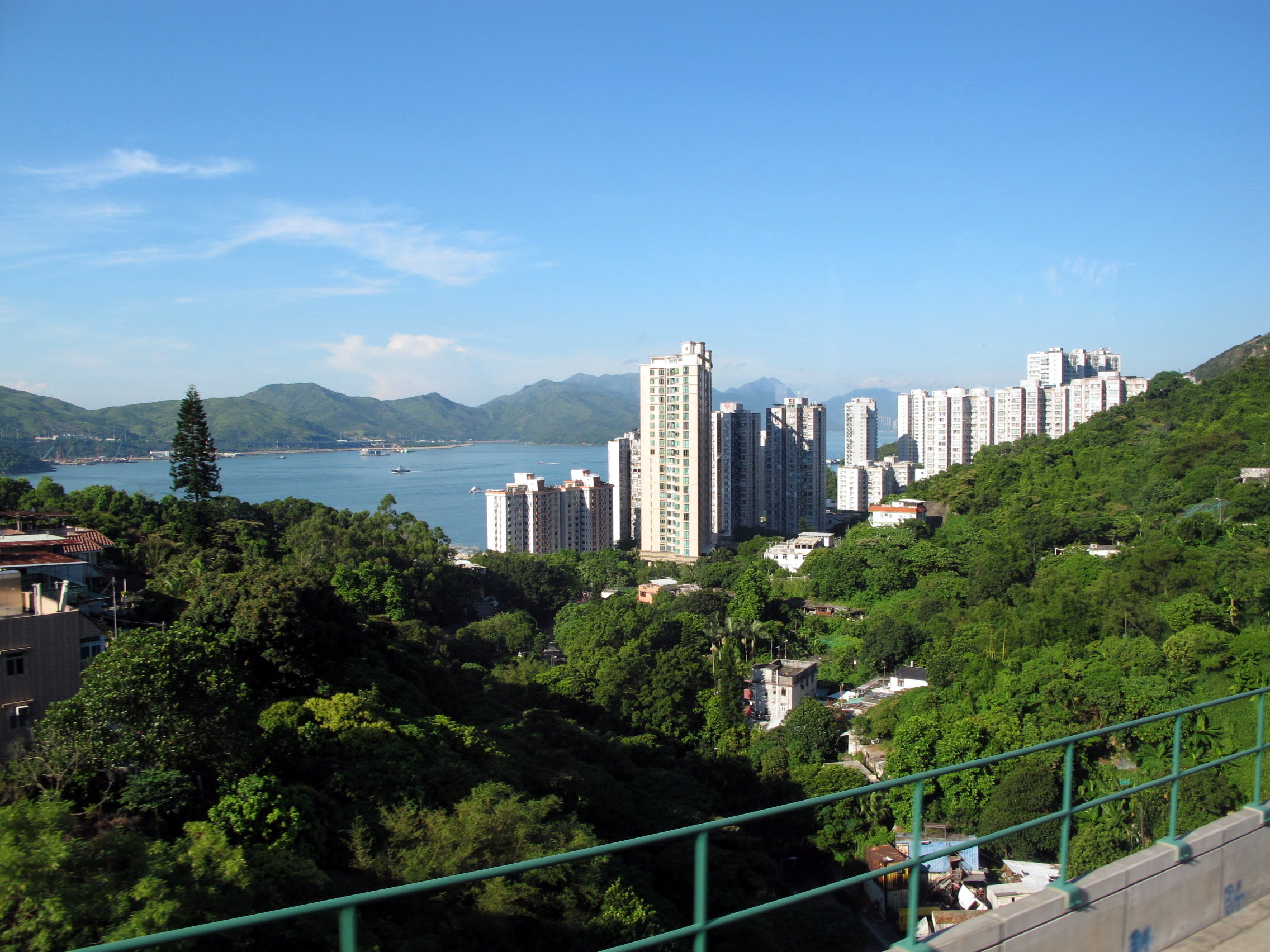
View of Tsing Lung Tau from Tuen Mun Road.

Tsing Lung Tau (Chinese: 青龍頭; lit. 'Head of the green dragon') is a coastal residential area in the southwest coast of the New Territories in Hong Kong.

== Geography ==
Tsing Lung Tau is located on the southwest coast of the New Territories in Hong Kong, between Sham Tseng and Tai Lam; west from Tsuen Wan and east of Tuen Mun. Tsing Lung Tau is west of the adjoining area of Sham Tseng, which is slightly larger. The coast of Tsing Lung Tau once was a stretch of long beaches with one named Dragon Beach (青龍灣) and some small farmlands, however, it was reclaimed by the HKSAR Government for the widening of the Castle Peak Road in 2006.

== Housing ==
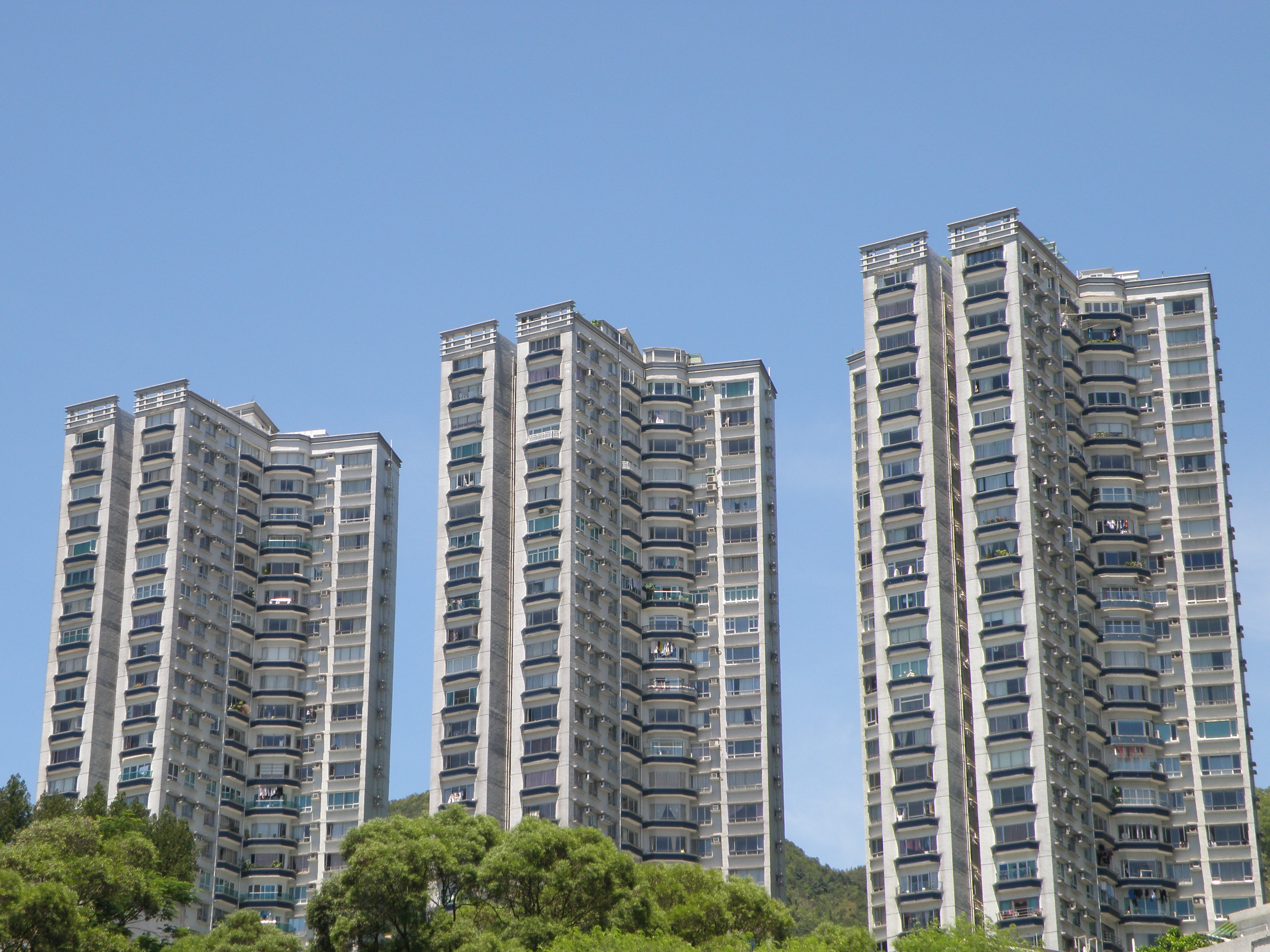
The three blocks of "The Top", part of Hong Kong Garden, were completed in 2002.

There are three villages in Tsing Lung Tau: Tsing Lung Tau Tsuen (青龍頭村), Tsing Lung Tau San Tsuen (青龍頭新村) and Yuen Tun Tsuen (圓墩村), with many villa-style developments.

The main private housing estates of the area are:

- Hong Kong Garden. 28 blocks, completed between 1986 and 2010.
- Sea Crest Villa Phase 5
- Lung Tang Court (龍騰閣). Located at 88-90 Castle Peak Road, it was completed in 1982.

Tsing Lung Tau is a recognized village under the New Territories Small House Policy.

== Built heritage ==
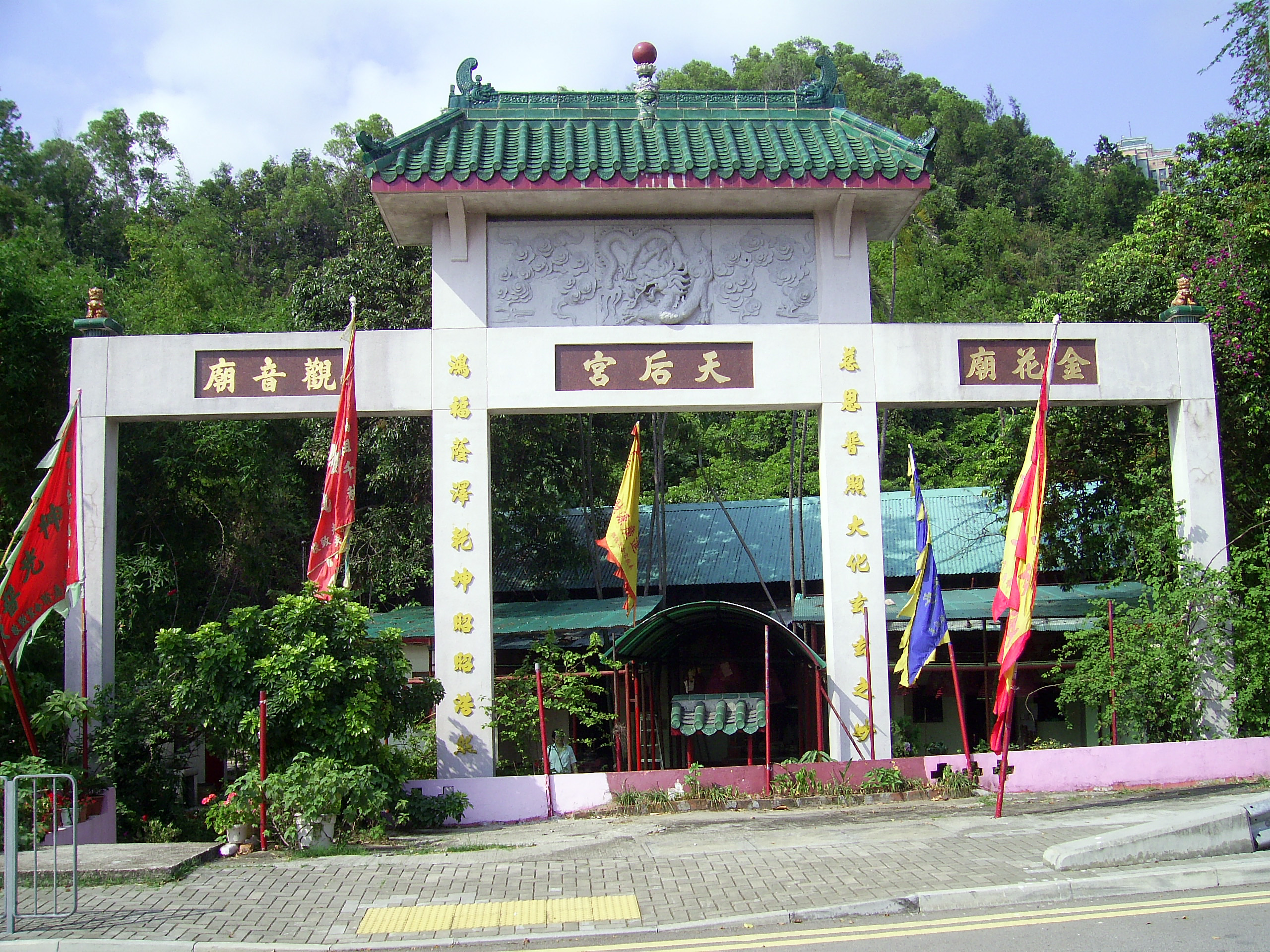
Tin Hau Temple along Castle Peak Road.

- Hong Kong Dragon Garden
- A Tin Hau Temple, located at Nos. 56-58 Castle Peak Road, was built before 1889.

== Transportation ==
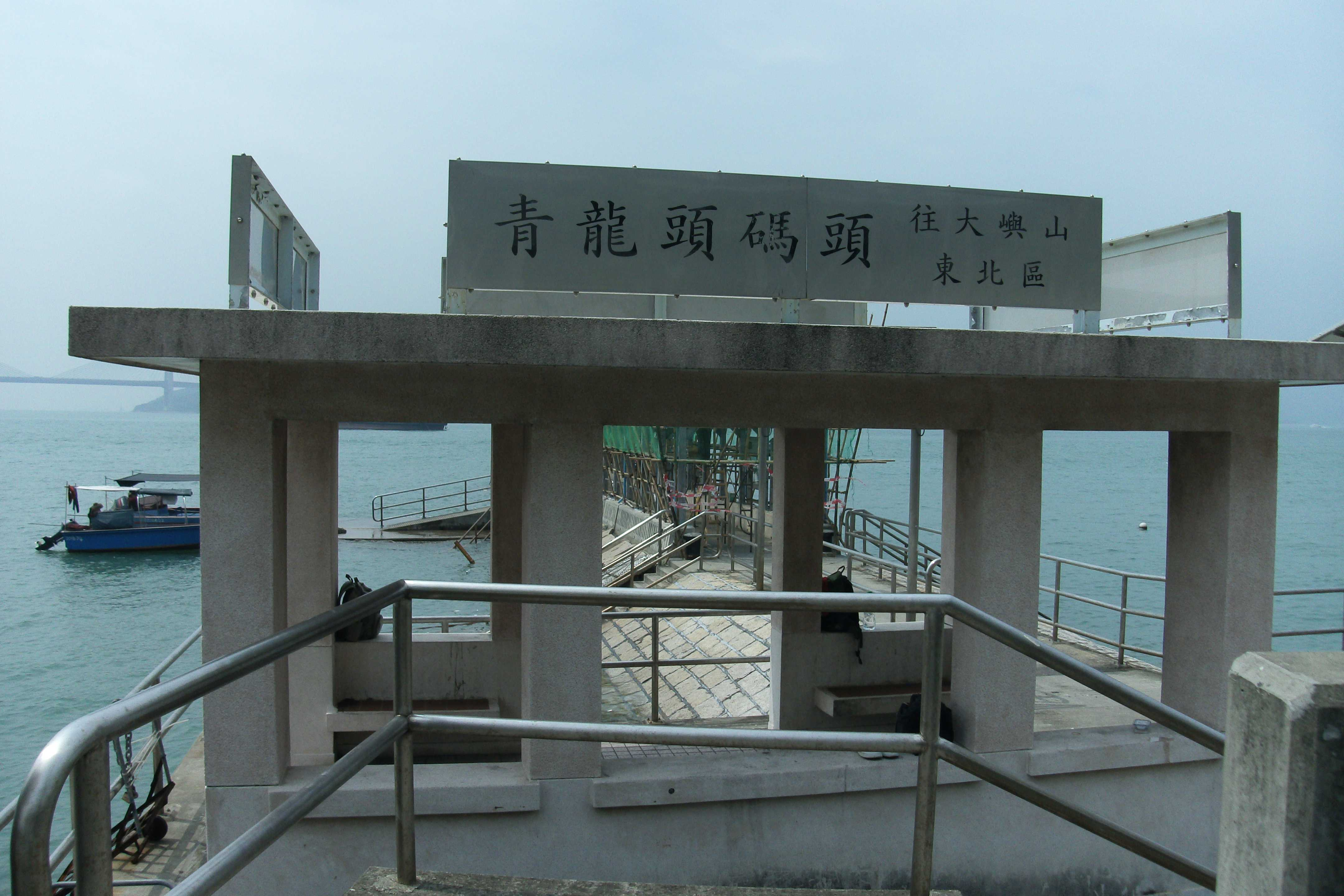
Tsing Lung Tau Ferry Pier

Castle Peak Road, the only major artery to Tsing Lung Tau, provides access to Tuen Mun (to the west) and Tsuen Wan (to the east).

Tsing Lung Tau Ferry Pier (青龍頭碼頭) is located near the junction of Lung Yue Road and Castle Peak Road. A former ferry service linking Tsing Lung Tau to Yam O has been suspended.

Bus service from Kowloon Motor Bus:

- 52X Tuen Mun Central - Mong Kok (Park Avenue)
- 53 Yuen Long (Yoho Mall) - Tsuen Wan (Nina Tower)

Bus service from Citybus:

- 952 Causeway Bay (Moreton Terrace) - Tuen Mun (Chi Lok Fa Yuen)

Bus service from Long Win Bus:

- A38 Tsuen Wan (Allway Gardens) - Airport (Ground Transportation Centre)

Minibus service:

- 96M Tsuen Wan station - Tsing Lung Tau
- 96 Tsuen Wan Market - Tsing Lung Tau
- 302 Kwai Fong station - Tsing Lung Tau Hong Kong Garden
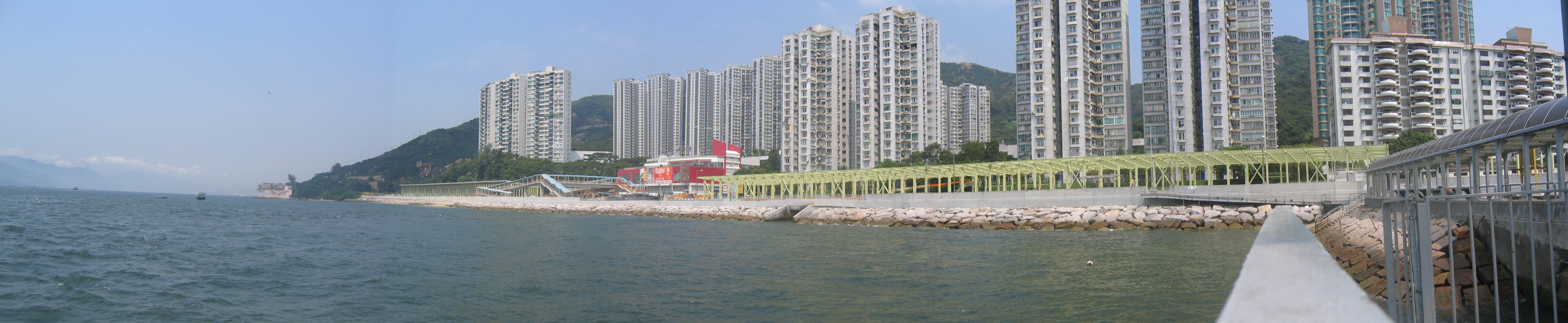
Tsing Lung Tau Pier
