= Peter Chan (disambiguation) =

Peter Chan is a film director and producer.

Peter Chan may also refer to:

- Peter Chan Chi-kwan (1936–2017), barrister-in-law for Hong Kong
- Peter Chan (businessman) (born 1959), Hong Kong businessman and former Feng shui geomancer
- Peter Chan (actor) (born 1982), Hong Kong actor
- Peter Chan (artist), video game and film concept artist
