= Lü Zuqian =

Chinese writer, historian and philosopher (1137–1181)

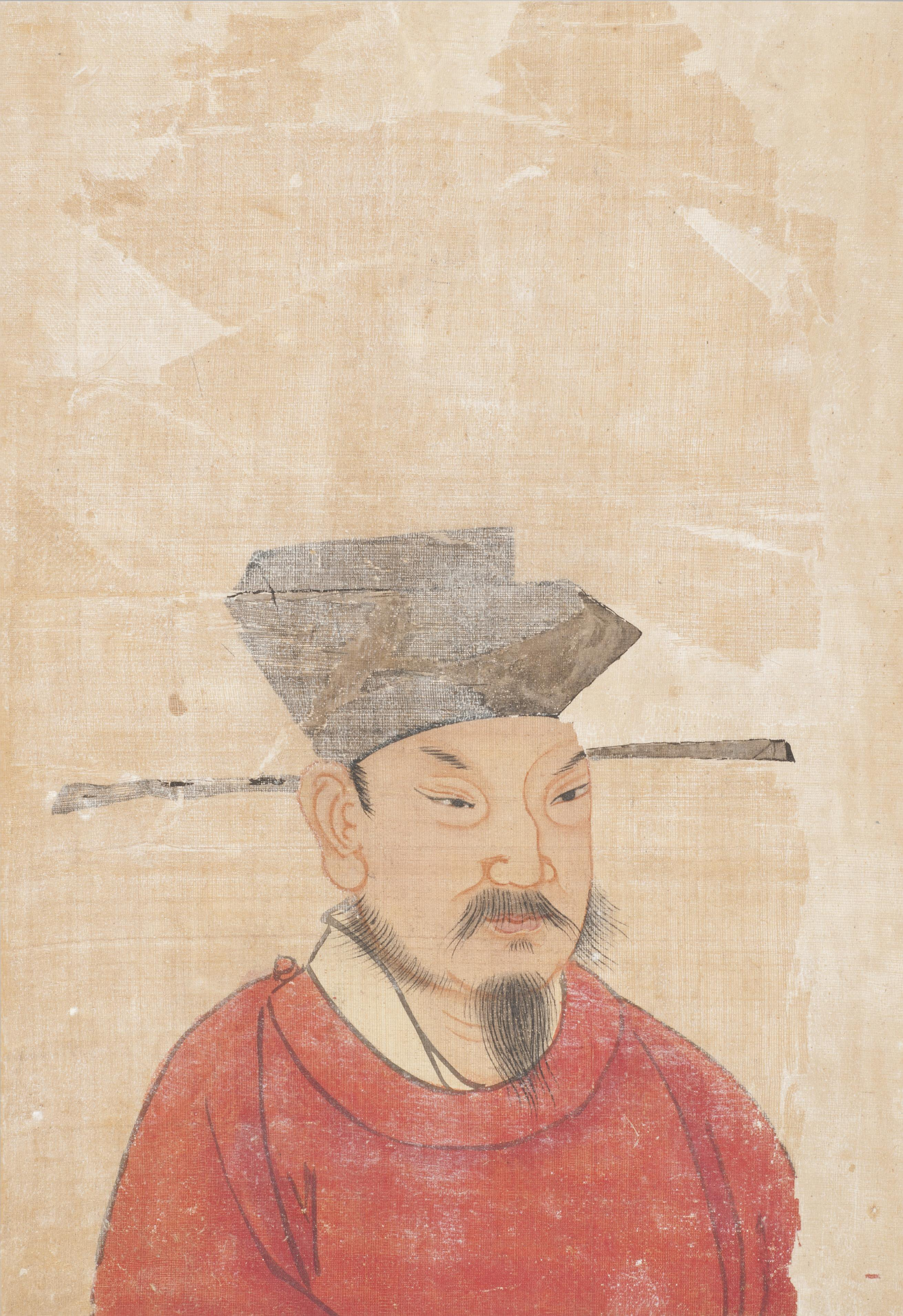
Portrait of Lü Zuqian in ink and color on silk, c. 19th - early 20th century

Lü Zuqian (呂祖謙) (1137-1181), also known by his courtesy name Bogong (伯恭), was a writer, historian, and philosopher during the Southern Song dynasty in China. Lü Zuqian's philosophical teachings are known as the "School of Lü," "School of Wuzhou," or "Donglai School.".

== Early life ==
His family originally came from modern Shanxi and moved several times. After the Song court relocated to Hangzhou and established the Southern Song dynasty since Jinkang incident, Lü Zuqian's grandfather settled in Wuzhou, which is now part of modern-day Jinhua, Zhejiang. Many members of his family held high positions in the Song government, and several are noted in historical records from that time.

== Academic life ==
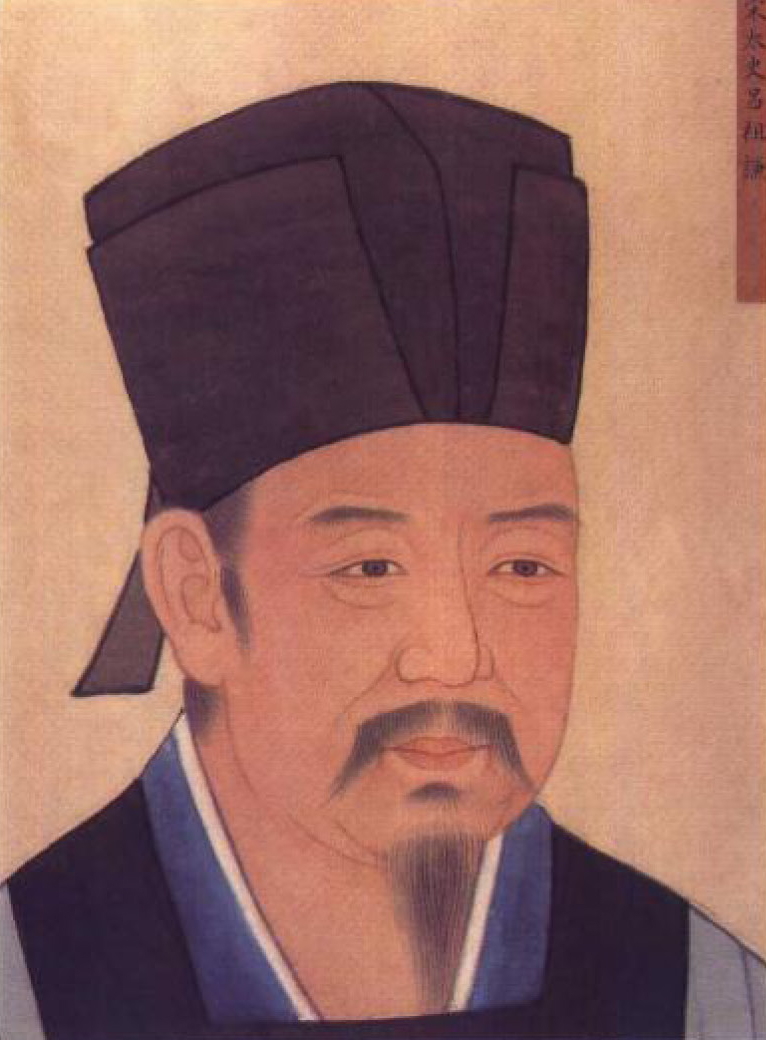
Lü Zuqian, Qing Dynasty painting, from the Palace Museum Collections, Beijing

Lü Zuqian earned his jinshi degree in 1163 and later became a junior compiler at the Historiography Academy (國史院編修官). He benefited from his family's political power and strong education, which allowed him to connect with famous Neo-Confucian scholars like Zhu Xi and Zhang Shi. Together, they were known as the "Three Worthies of the Southeast." Lü Zuqian had friendships with several other scholars such as Chen Fuliang and Chen Liang. He initiated the Swan Lake conference, where Zhu Xi and his rival Lu Jiuyuan discussed their philosophical ideas.

He was also appointed one of the chief examiners during the 1172 imperial examinations.

== Philosophy ==
Lü Zuqian was greatly influenced by Zhou Dunyi, the Cheng brothers, and Zhang Zai in his thinking, especially regarding moral understanding and terms like "rite" (li), "Supreme Ultimate" (taiji), and "nature" (xing). However, Lü's exact views on these concepts are not well-documented, as he has not received much attention from scholars. Some modern scholars believe that Lü aimed to combine the Cheng brothers' different ideas: Cheng Hao's focus on the "heart/mind" (a more personal approach) and Cheng Yi's focus on "pattern" (a more analytical approach).

== Historiography ==
Lü Zuqian believed that a great philosopher should merge Confucian teachings with practical uses. He wrote many books exploring how Confucianism could be applied in real life. These included titles like Donglai boyi and Gu Zhouyi. He wrote on the imperial court's history and compiled and edited prose writings from the year 960 to 1126. Lü felt studying history was vital to learn from past successes and failures. He thought the Confucian Classics could provide practical guidance, though this view was criticized by Zhu Xi, who rejected his interpretation of the Classics as historical texts. Due to Zhu Xi's criticism of Lü's literary works after his death, Lü's works has not been thoroughly studied by scholars.
