= Tianzhang Pavilion =

Song palace building in Kaifeng, Henan, China

Tianzhang Pavilion or Tianzhangge, also translated as Hall of Heavenly Manifestations, was one of the palace buildings during the Song dynasty to house the Hanlin Academy. It was built in 1020 in the Song capital of Kaifeng. Bao Zheng and Sima Guang have both been edict attendants at Tianzhang Pavilion.
