= Chanzong Yongjia ji =

Tang dynasty Chan/Zen literature prominently printed in Korea

The Chanzong Yongjia ji (Chinese: 禪宗永嘉集, Pinyin: Chánzōng yǒngjiā jí, Korean: 선종영가집 or Sseonjong yeonggajip), meaning "Collection of Yongjia of the Chan School", is an 8th century Tang dynasty Chan Buddhist (Zen) text authored by Yongjia Xuanjue, a student of Huineng, and author of the Song of Enlightenment, the only other extant work of his that survives.

== Description ==
The Yongjia ji, as it is known, was composed in the 8th century, and delineates the fundamental principles of meditation and proper etiquette for practice. Yongjia sought to interpret the fundamentals of Chan/Zen doctrine in a simplified manner so that people could easily understand it.

The content is split into ten parts

1. “intent and formalities in appreciating the way"
2. "haughtiness in keeping moral precepts" (Śīla)
3. "the pure cultivation of three modes of action"
4. Samatha
5. Vipaśyanā
6. Upekṣā
7. "gradual cultivation of the three vehicles"
8. "principle and phenomena are nondual"
9. "letters of encouragement from a friend"
10. "vows"

== Korean Manuscripts ==
From the Goryeo to the Joseon dynasty, the Chanzong Yongjia ji saw publication and printings as part of Seon Buddhist teachings. Under the Cultural Heritage Administration, six manuscripts of the work received the designation as Treasures.

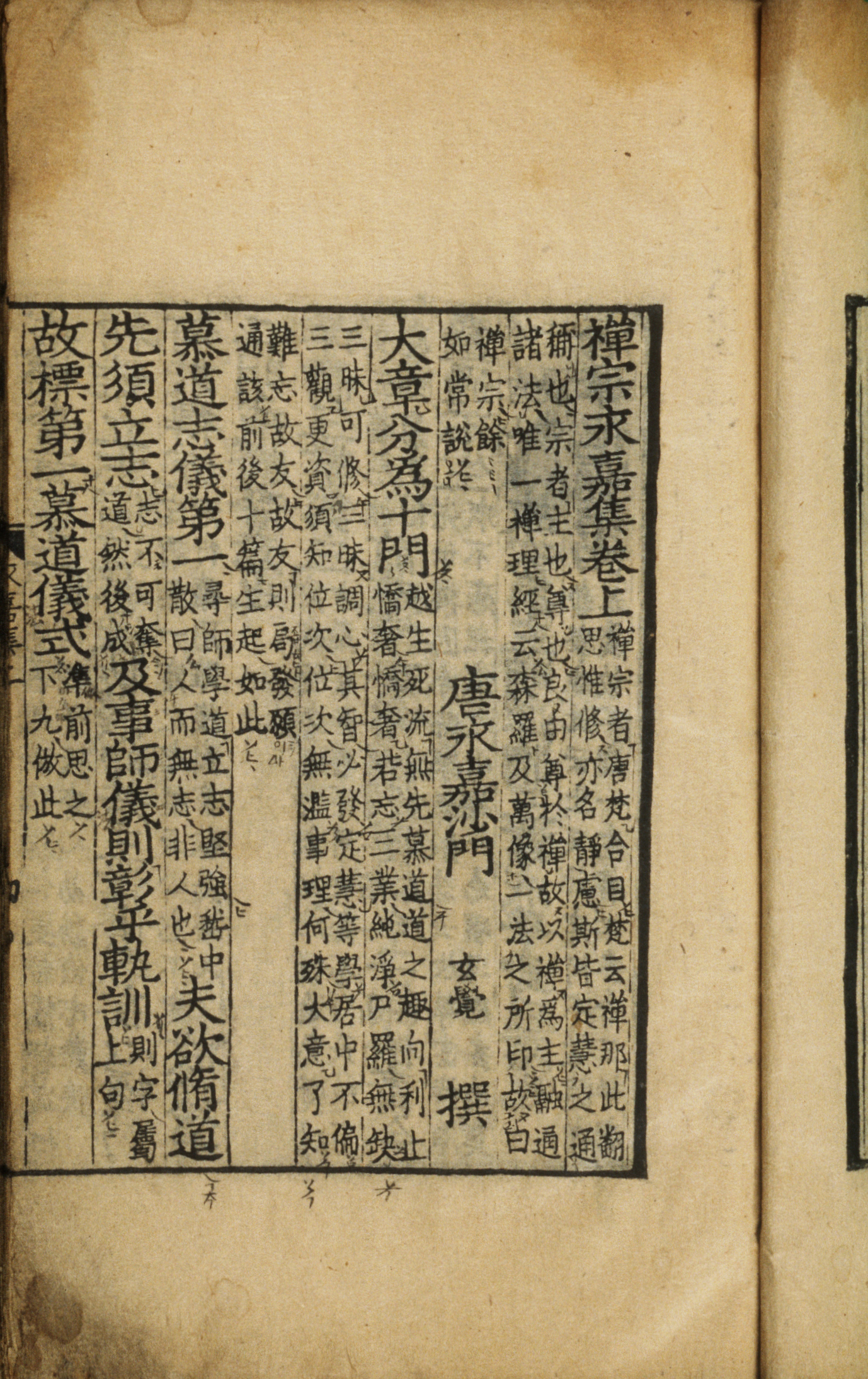
Treasure No. 641

=== Treasure No. 641 ===
A woodblock printed book, it is a one volume piece printed on mulberry paper measuring 26.9 cm x 19.6 cm. It was published by Yi Inrin, Gangnul, and Damyeo, printed in Cheongyongsa Temple in 4th to 7th year of U of Goryeo's reign (1378-1381). It was designated Treasure on 7 December 1978 and is held by the Adan Library, Seoul.

=== Treasure No. 774 ===
The copy was made in the Joseon period, consisting of two volumes. They were produced in Gangyeongdogam, the primarily printing institute for Buddhist scripture during the reign of Sejo of Joseon (10th year - 1464). The first volume measures 33.1 x 20.3. The second volume measures 32.6 x 21.2, during the reign of Yeonsangun of Joseon, made under order by Dowager Queen Jeonghyeon to pray for Seongjong of Joseon (1495). The latter print was made at Wongaksa. Designated Treasure on 30 May 1984, and is held by Dongguk University.

=== Treasure No. 1163 ===
Another copy identical to Treasure No. 774, but only Volume 2, measuring 32.8 cm x 21 cm on mulberry paper. Designated Treasure on 15 June 1993, it is currently held by the National Palace Museum of Korea.

=== Treasure No. 1297 ===
Published in 1472 during the reign of Seongjong of Joseon, Queen Dowager Insu had the texts commissioned to pray for the deceased King Sejo, Yejong of Joseon, Crown Prince Uigyeong, as well for the longevity of Queen Jeonghui and the long life of the current monarch at the time. Designated Treasure on 15 December 1999, and held by the Seoul Museum of History.

=== Geoboesa Temple ===
Missing covers, and portions of the second volume, the book consist of a mix of mulberry and oat paper. The text was supervised by King Sejo along with the Joseon monk Sinmi; its preface was written by Hwang Su-sin (1407-1467), and supervised by twenty officials. The text is Bilingual, with Chinese text and Korean translations and is considered a transitional piece with hangul being featured, and as such is considered more valuable than Treasure 774 and 1163.

=== Daegu Nam-gu ===
Two volumes, also facilitated by Sinmi in Hangul and Hanja. The first volume contains the seal "Proofread", and the last four chapters of Volume II are missing, yet it is considered the best preserved copy among the Korean manuscripts. Designated Treasure on 31 August 2017.
