= Song of Enlightenment =

The Song of Enlightenment (traditional Chinese: 證道歌; simplified Chinese: 证道歌; pinyin: Zhèngdào gē; Wade–Giles: Cheng-dao ke; Japanese: Shōdōka; Korean: 증도가; Vietnamese: Chứng đạo ca; lit. 'prove Way song'), also translated as Song of Awakening, Song of Freedom and Song of Actualizing the Way, is a Chan discourse written some time in the first half of the 8th century C.E. and usually attributed to Yongjia Xuanjue. The true authorship of the work is a matter of debate, with a number of elements in the writing suggesting either the text has been substantially changed over time or Yongjia was an unlikely author. According to Jinhua Jia, the Zhengdao ge likely originated within the Hongzhou School. The first commentaries appeared in the 11th century during the Song Dynasty. The first English commentary on the work was written by Charles Luk. The Song deals with the methods of and attitudes towards daily Chan/Zen practice. A central theme is the contrast between dharma-nature, or reality as it is, versus buddha-nature, or self-nature. It also emphasizes practice over sutra-study. It has been considered a central Chan/Zen text from the Song Dynasty to the present day. It was apparently so highly esteemed that Dahui Zonggao reported that it was translated from Chinese to Sanskrit so it could be studied elsewhere. Today it is often memorized by Chan/Zen practitioners in East Asian countries.

== See also ==
- Chanzong Yongjia ji - the only other extant surviving work by Yongjia Xuanjue
