= Dragon Beach =

Beach in Antarctica

Location of Varna Peninsula in the South Shetland Islands.

Dragon Beach (62°28′S 60°8′W) is a broad gravel and bounder strewn area flanking Dragon Cove, and extending up to about 10 metres (33 ft) above sea level on Varna Peninsula, Livingston Island in Antarctica. To the north it ascends to the Williams Point platform, to the south it is bounded by an ice ramp, and rises to the west onto the flank of Gargoyle Bastion. The feature is a major source of petrified wood, which is abundantly strewn over this area and has been exposed by weathering from an underlying, poorly exposed volcanic ignimbrite deposit. It was named by the UK Antarctic Place-Names Committee in 1998 in association with Dragon Cove.

Dragon Cove itself was named following air photography by the Falkland Islands and Dependencies Aerial Survey Expedition and ground survey by the Falkland Islands Dependencies Survey, 1956–58, after the brig Dragon (Captain A. McFarlane) of Liverpool, which visited the South Shetland Islands and north Graham Land, 1820–21.

== Maps ==
- L.L. Ivanov. Antarctica: Livingston Island and Greenwich, Robert, Snow and Smith Islands. Scale 1:120000 topographic map. Troyan: Manfred Wörner Foundation, 2009. ISBN 978-954-92032-6-4 (Updated second edition 2010. ISBN 978-954-92032-9-5)
