= Nina Tower =

Skyscrapers in Tsuen Wan, Hong Kong

- 如心廣場
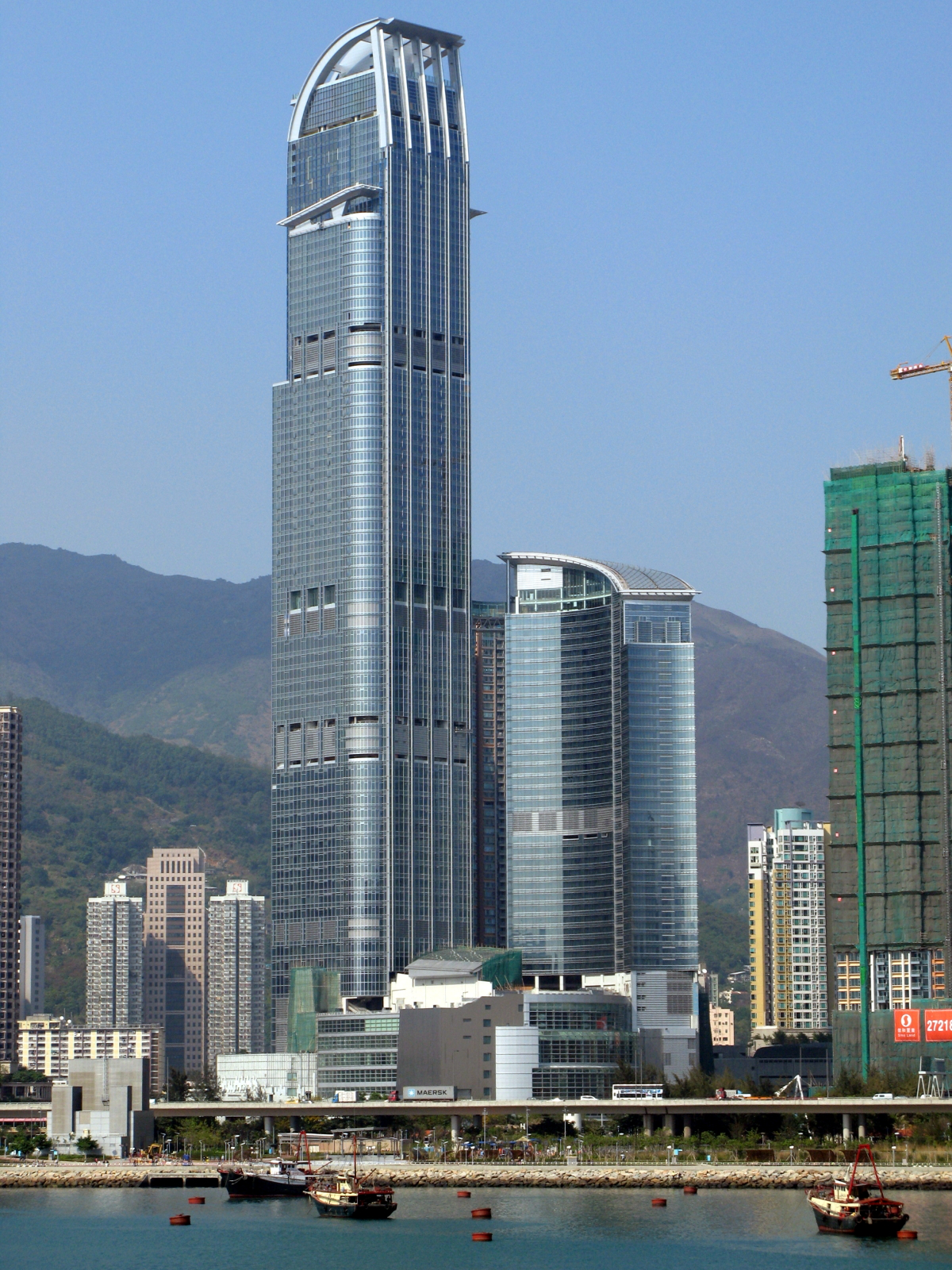

General information
- Type: Office, hotel and retail
- Location: 8 Yeung Uk Road, Tsuen Wan, Hong Kong
- Coordinates: 22°22′07″N 114°06′47″E
- Construction started: 2000; 26 years ago
- Completed: 2005; 21 years ago

Height
- Architectural: 320.4 m (1,051 ft)
- Roof: 319.8 m (1,049 ft)
- Top floor: 301.1 m (988 ft)
- Observatory: 151.7 m (498 ft)

Technical details
- Floor count: 80
- Lifts/elevators: 60

Design and construction
- Architects: Arthur CS Kwok; Casa Design International; Dennis Lau & Ng Chun Man Architects & Engineers (HK) Ltd. (DLN)
- Developer: Chinachem
- Structural engineer: Arup

Nina Tower
- Traditional Chinese: 如心廣場
- Simplified Chinese: 如心广场
Transcriptions
Standard Mandarin
- Hanyu Pinyin: Rúxīn Guǎngchǎng
Yue: Cantonese
- Jyutping: jyu4 sam1 gwong2 coeng4

Nina Tower are two 80-storey and 42-storey high-rise buildings in Tsuen Wan, New Territories, Hong Kong, near Tsuen Wan West station. The tower was designed to be the tallest tower in the world at 518 m (1,699 ft). However, due to its location near Chek Lap Kok Airport, the height was restricted to the current 319.8 m (1,049 ft).

The owner of Chinachem Group later changed her plan and broke it into two towers. The lower is known as Nina Tower, symbolising the late Nina Wang or Kung Yu Sum natively, the owner of Chinachem Group; the higher is Teddy Tower, symbolising her husband Teddy Wang, who was kidnapped and has since disappeared. Despite the different tower names, the whole development is called Nina Tower.

== Description ==
The complex is home to a 1608-room premium hotel, Nina Hotel Tsuen Wan West, office space, shopping mall and convention & event space. A sky lobby is located at the 41st floor which connects the 2 towers.

The office of Chinachem Group and Nina Hospitality Company Limited are located at the complex.

In March 2021, L’hotel Group has been renamed Nina Hospitality to unveil its brand transformation.

The complex contains the head office of Chinachem.

== Floor plan ==
Although the Nina Tower has 80 actual floors, any number that are labelled “4” in the last digit are omitted due to the sounding "four" and "death" have a similar pronunciation in Mandarin Chinese. Therefore, the topmost floor of the building is numbered 89.

Level	Tower level	Type
89	76	Mechanical
88	75	Hotel Suites
87	74	Hotel Suites
86	73	Mechanical
85	72	Nina Hotel (guest rooms)
83	71	Nina Hotel (guest rooms)
82	70	Nina Hotel (guest rooms)
81	69	Nina Hotel (guest rooms)
80	68	Nina Hotel (guest rooms)
79	67	Nina Hotel (guest rooms)
78	66	Nina Hotel (guest rooms)
77	65	Nina Hotel (guest rooms)
76	64	Nina Hotel (guest rooms)
75	63	Nina Hotel (guest rooms)
73	62	Nina Hotel (guest rooms)
72	61	Nina Hotel (guest rooms)
71	60	Nina Hotel (guest rooms)
70	59	Nina Hotel (guest rooms)
69	58	Nina Hotel (guest rooms)
68	57	Nina Hotel (guest rooms)
67	56	Nina Hotel (guest rooms)
66	55	Nina Hotel (guest rooms)
65	54	Mechanical
63	53	Mechanical
62	52	Refuge
61	51	Nina Hotel (guest rooms)
60	50	Nina Hotel (guest rooms)
59	49	Nina Hotel (guest rooms)
58	48	Nina Hotel (guest rooms)
57	47	Nina Hotel (guest rooms)
56	46	Nina Hotel (guest rooms)
55	45	Nina Hotel (guest rooms)
53	44	Nina Hotel (guest rooms)
52	43	Nina Hotel (guest rooms)
51	42	Nina Hotel (guest rooms)
50	41	Nina Hotel (guest rooms)
49	40	Nina Hotel (guest rooms)
48	39	Nina Hotel (guest rooms)
47	38	Nina Hotel (guest rooms)
46	37	Nina Hotel (guest rooms)
45	36	Nina Hotel (guest rooms)
43	35	Nina Hotel (guest rooms)
42	34	Nina Hotel (guest rooms)
41	33	Nina Tower Hotel Skylobby
39	32	Mechanical
38	31	Mechanical
37	30	Offices
36	29	Offices
35	28	Offices
33	27	Offices
32	26	Offices
31	25	Mechanical
29	24	Mechanical
28	23	Refuge
27	22	Offices
26	21	Offices
25	20	Offices
23	19	Offices
22	18	Offices
21	17	Offices
19	16	Offices
18	15	Offices
17	14	Offices
16	13	Offices
15	12	Offices
12	11	Offices
11	10	Conference Room
10	9	Hotel Executive Office
9	8	Cafe Circles, Fitness Centre, Pool
8	7	Hotel Management Office
7	6	Ballroom, Lounge, Restaurant
6	5	Exhibition Centre
5	4	Exhibition Centre
3	3	Retail
2	2	Retail
1	1	Retail
G	G	Office Lobby, Hotel Lobby
UB	UB	Loading Dock, Car Park, Mechanical
LB	LB	Loading Dock, Car Park, Mechanical

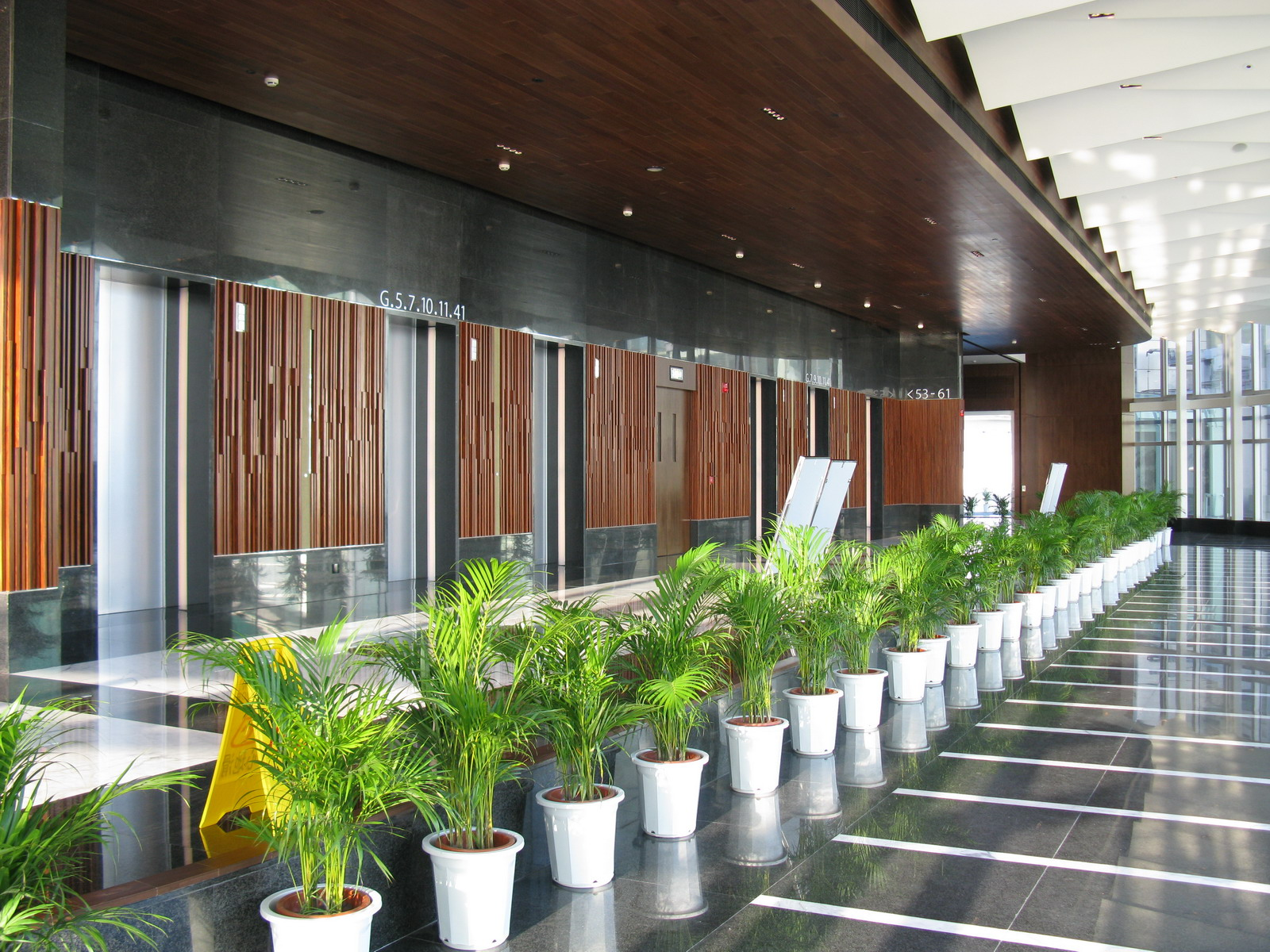
The sky lobby located on 41/F

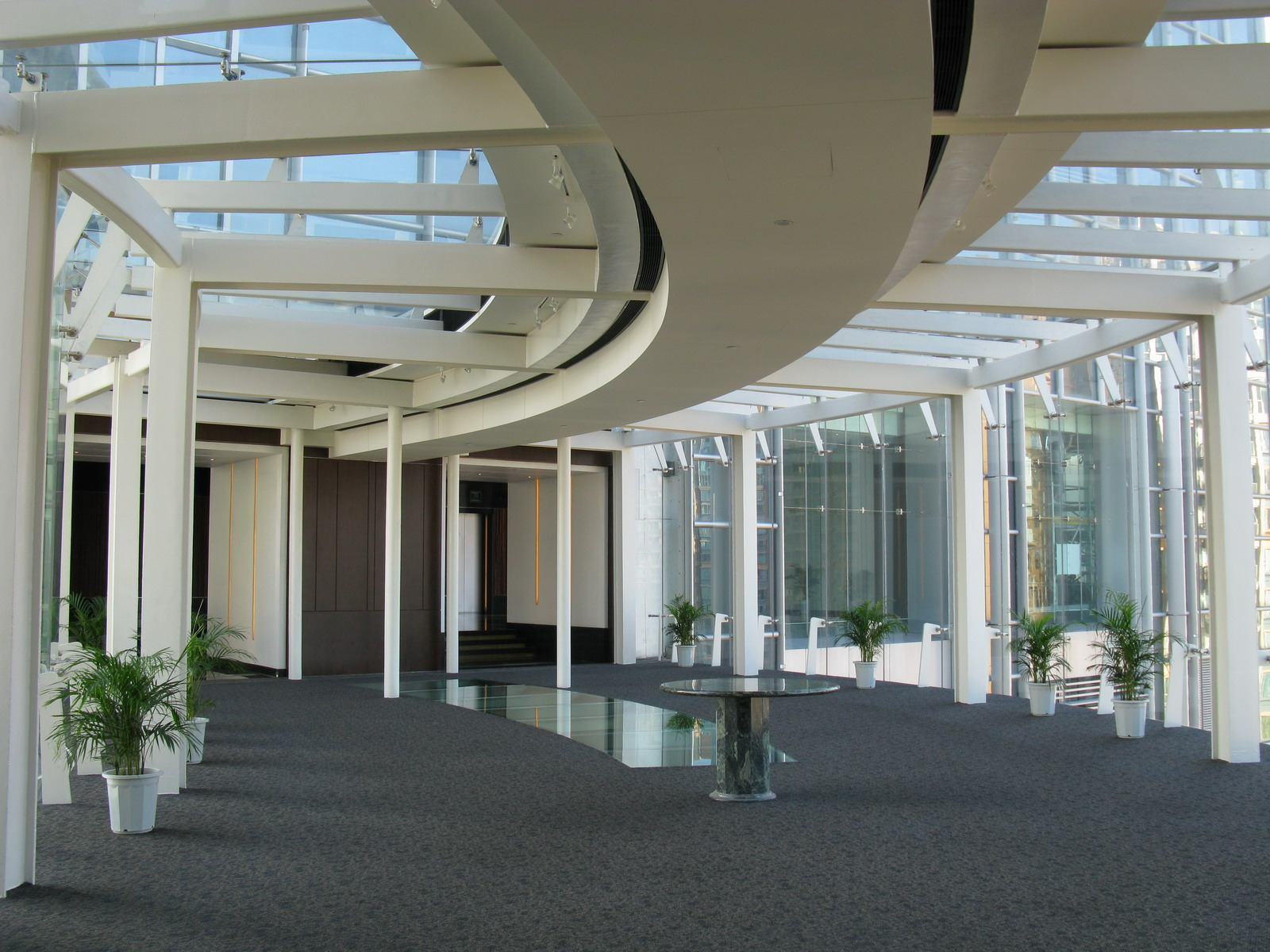
The sky bridge located on 41/F

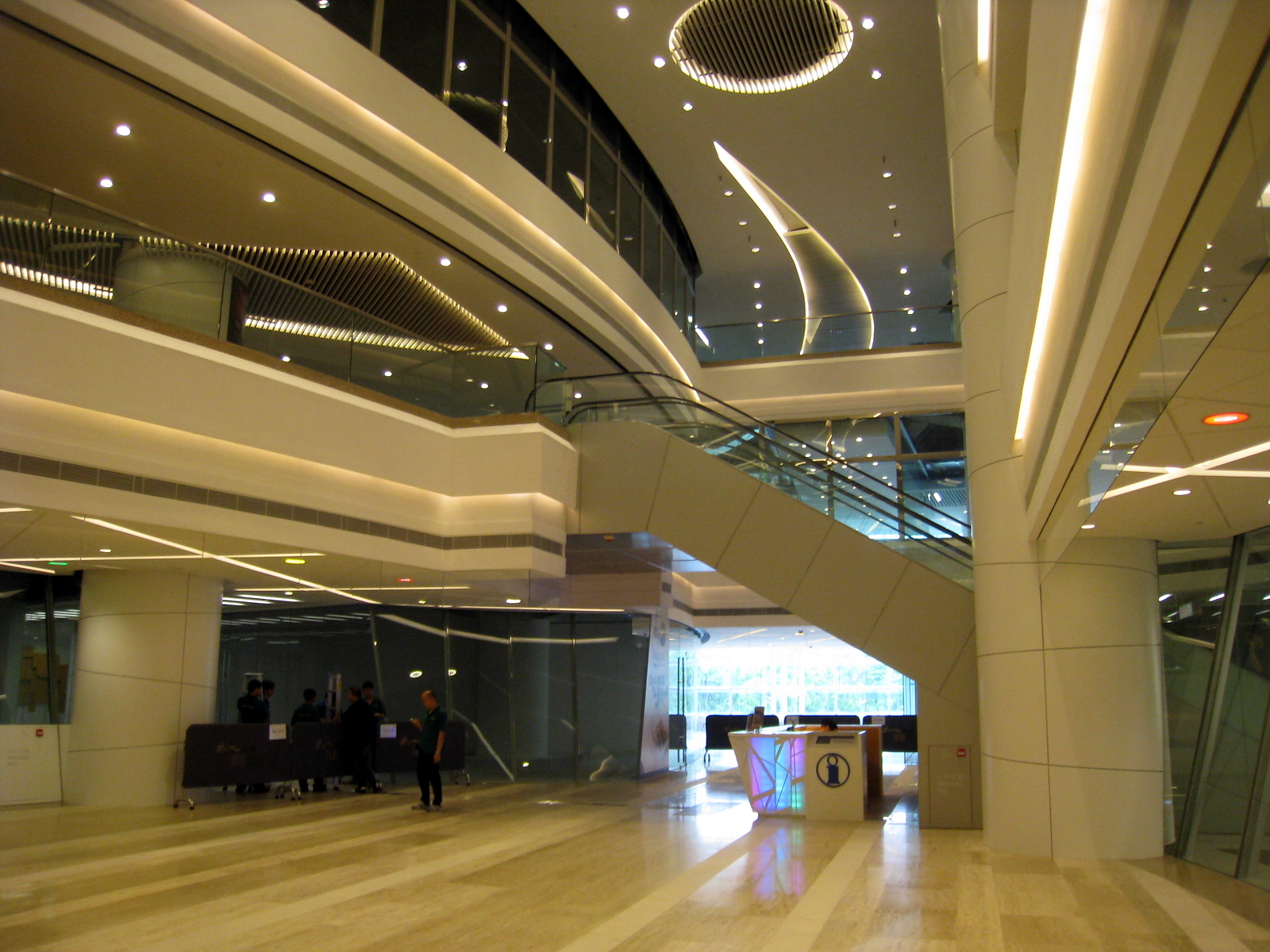
The Shopping Arcade of Nina Tower

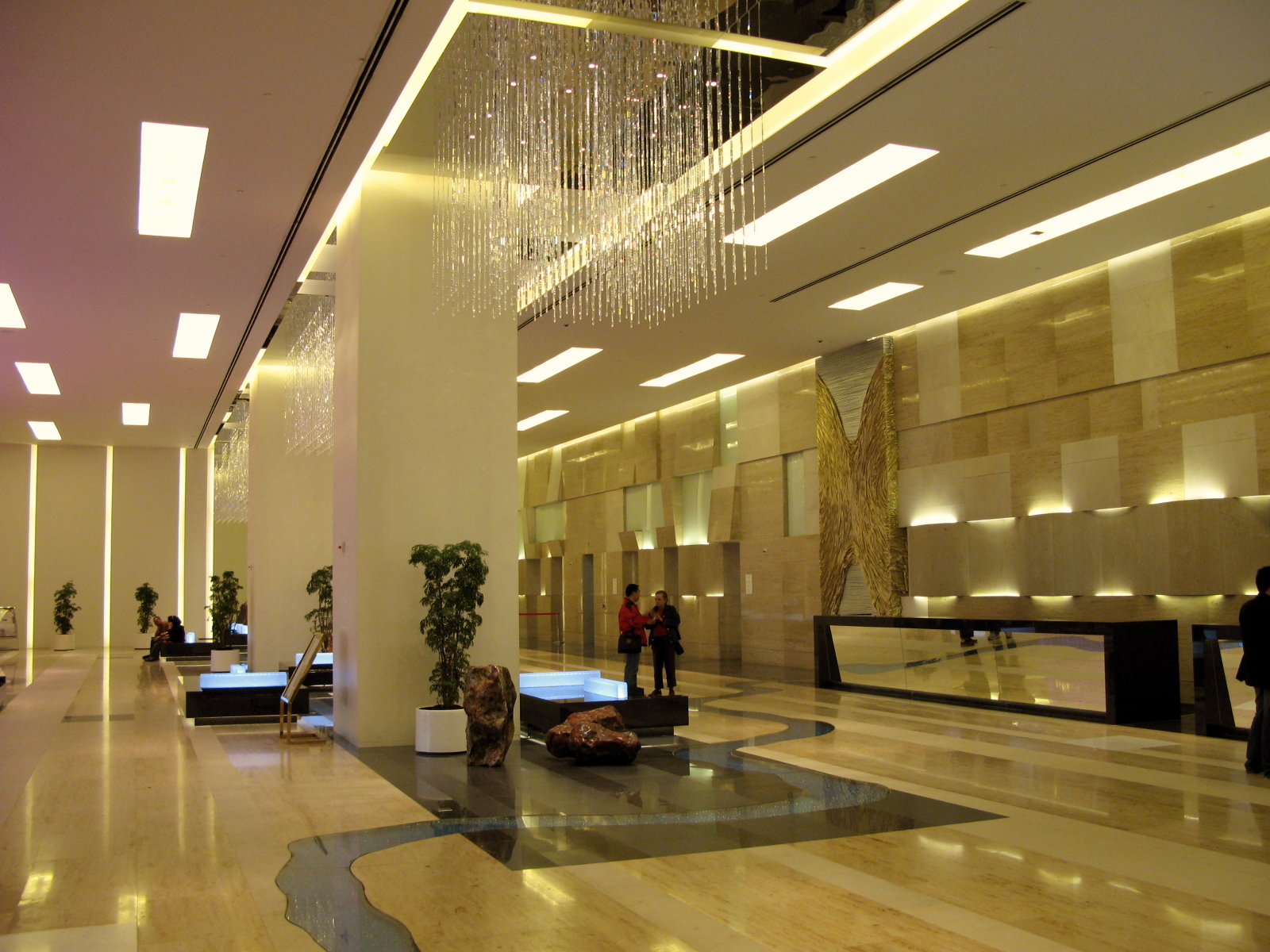
The hotel lobby of Nina Tower

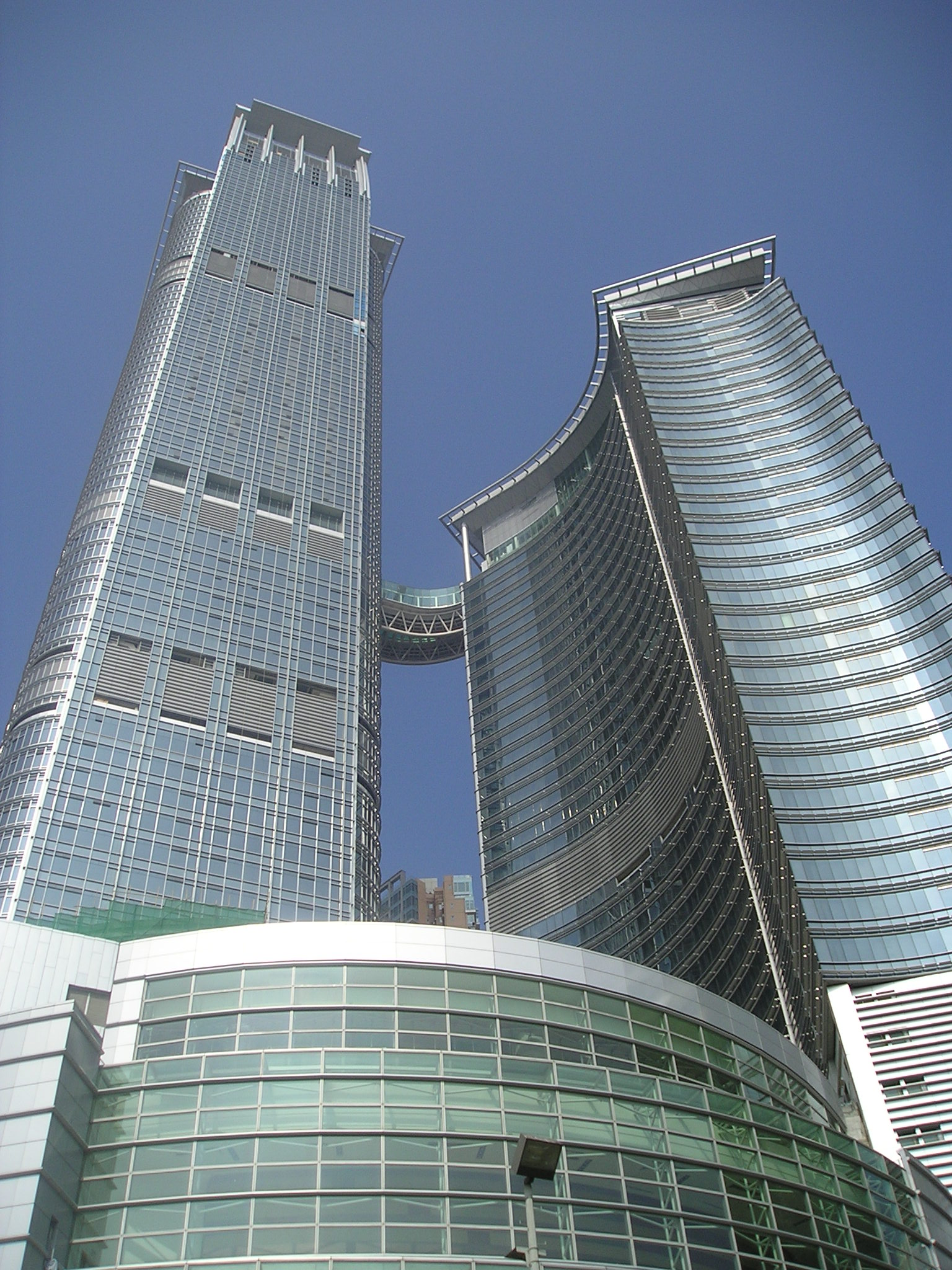
Nina Tower in Tsuen Wan, December 2007

== See also ==
- List of tallest buildings in Hong Kong
- Nina Park – urban fossil park located within the Nina Tower development
