= Hong Kong Garden (Hong Kong) =

Housing estate in Tsing Lung Tau, Hong Kong

Coordinates: 22.363°N 114.043°E

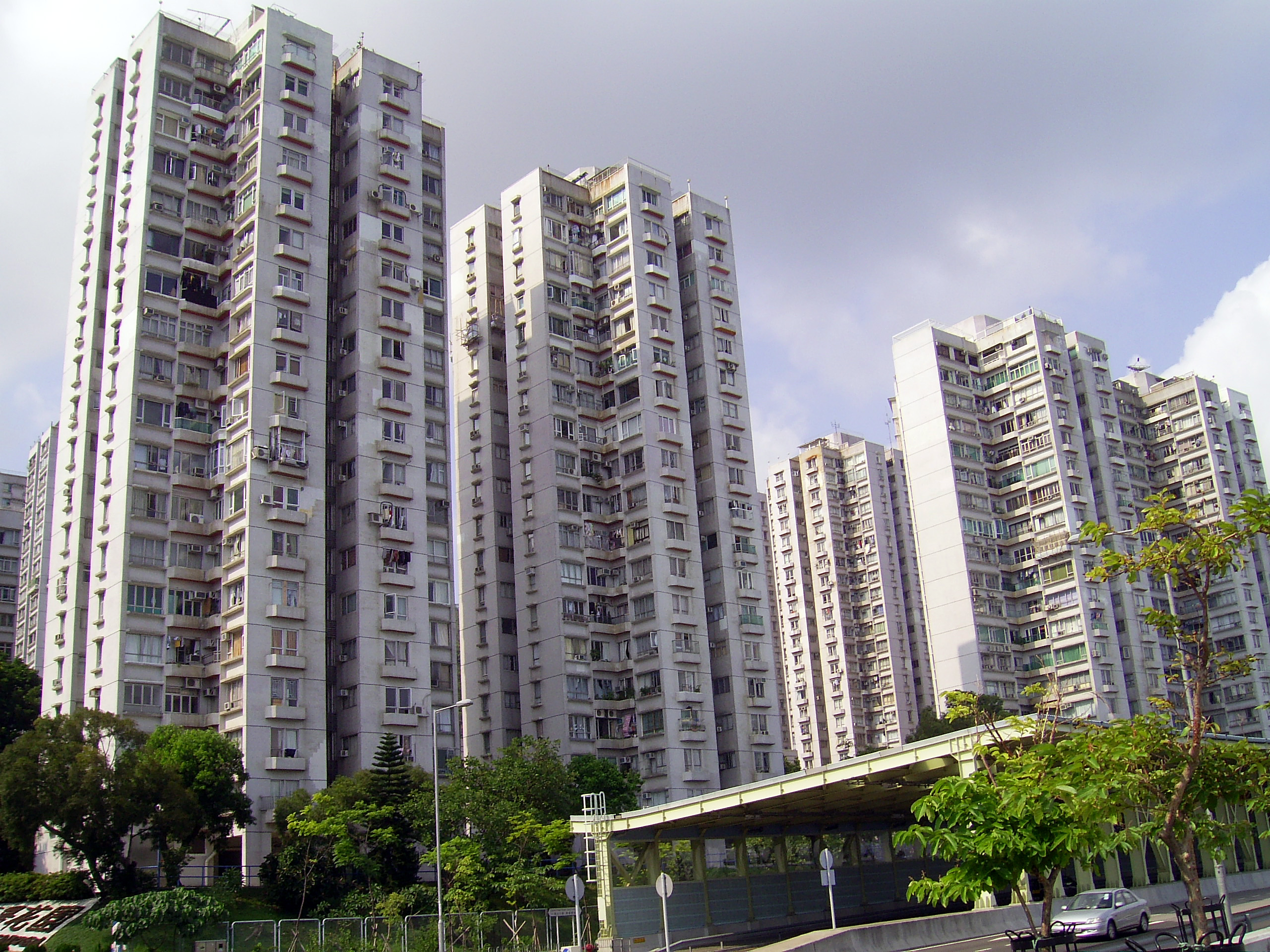
- Traditional Chinese: 豪景花園
- Simplified Chinese: 豪景花园
Transcriptions
Standard Mandarin
- Hanyu Pinyin: háojǐng huāyuán
Yue: Cantonese
- Jyutping: hou4 ging2 faa1 jyun2

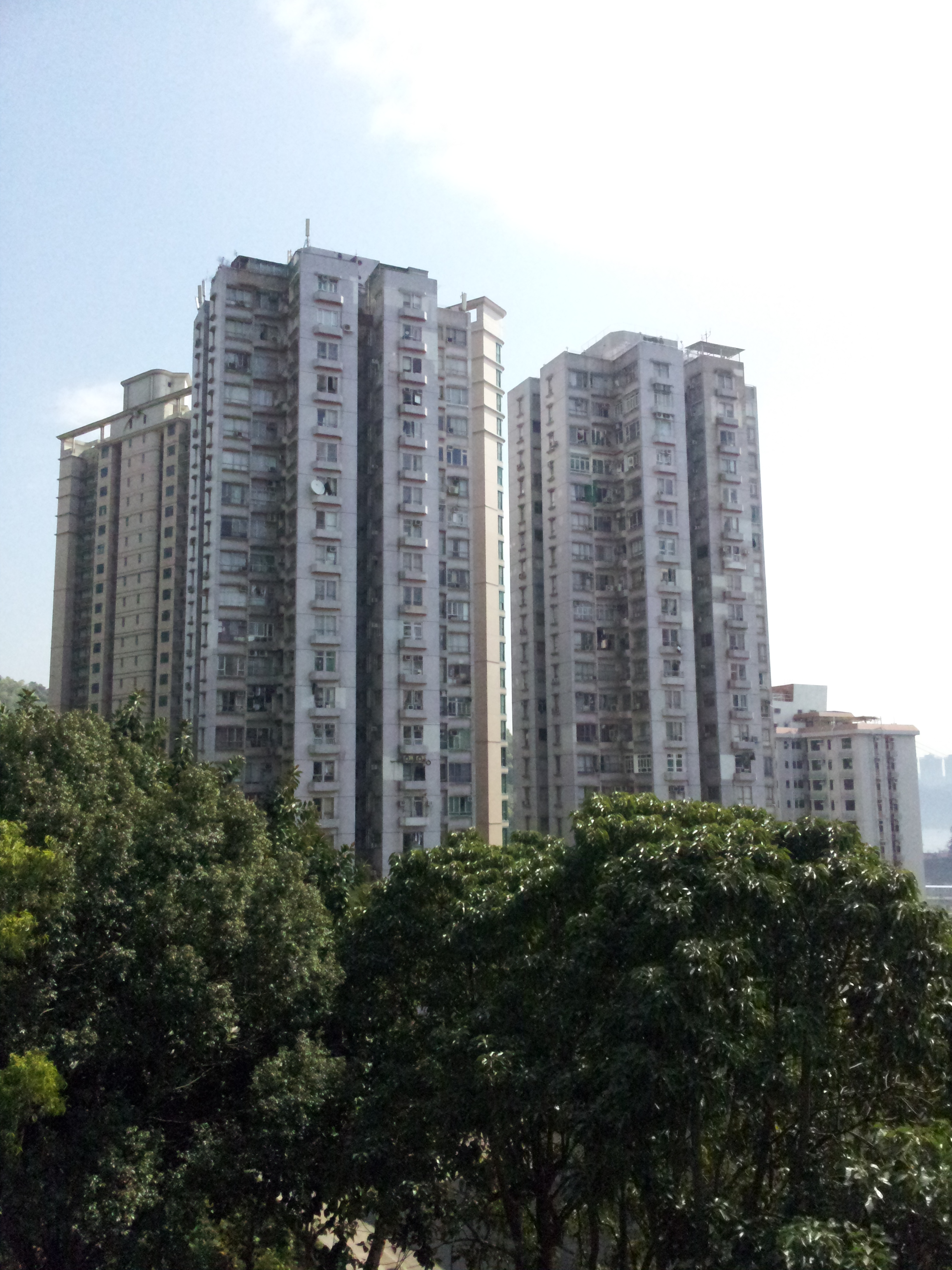
Block 5 and 6 of Hong Kong Garden

Hong Kong Garden is Tsing Lung Tau's largest private housing estate between Sham Tseng and Tai Lam in Hong Kong. Hong Kong Garden was developed by the property developer Chinachem Group in late 1980s and built in three phases. It has 28 blocks and 2830 flats from 300 sq ft to 1400 sq ft, including The Top and Perfetto.

It is located at 100 Castle Peak Road, Tsing Lung Tau in the New Territories.

Building name (phase 1)	Completion
Block 1	1986
Block 2	1986
Block 3	1986
Block 4	1986
Block 5 (Admiralty Heights)	1986
Block 6 (Beverley Heights)	1986

Building name (phase 2)	Completion
Block 7 (Carmel Heights)	1987
Block 8 (Dominion Heights)	1987
Block 9 (Estoril Heights)	1987
Block 10 (Fontana Heights)	1988
Block 11 (Grenville Heights)	1988
Block 12 (Hoover Heights)	1988

Building name (phase 3)	Completion
Block 13 (Imperial Heights)	1988
Block 14 (Jade Heights)	1988
Block 15 (Yale Villa)	1991
Block 16 (Kingston Heights)	1990
Block 17 (Lincoln Heights)	1990
Block 18 (Manhattan Heights)	1991
Block 19 (The Top-Courser) (Nelly Heights previously)	2002
Block 20 (The Top－Genial) (Orchid Heights previously)	2002
Block 21 (The Top－Palace) (Peony Heights previously)	2002
Block 22 (Queen's Heights)	1990
Block 23 (Regent Heights)	1990
Block 24 (Savoy Heights)	1990
Block 25 (Triumphant Heights)	1989
Block 26 (Unicorn Heights)	1989
Block 27 (Perfetto－Perfetto Posto) (Venus Heights previously)	2010
Block 28 (Perfetto －Perfetto Senso) (Woodland Heights previously)	2010

== Demographics ==
According to the 2016 by-census, Hong Kong Garden had a population of 7,942. The median age was 42.6 and the majority of residents (89.9 per cent) were of Chinese ethnicity. The average household size was 3 people. The median monthly household income of all households (i.e. including both economically active and inactive households) was HK$45,000.

== Politics ==
Hong Kong Garden is located in Tsuen Wan Rural constituency of the Tsuen Wan District Council. It was formerly represented by Ng Hin-lung, who was elected in the 2019 elections until July 2021.
