= Ye Shi =

Song dynasty neo-Confucian

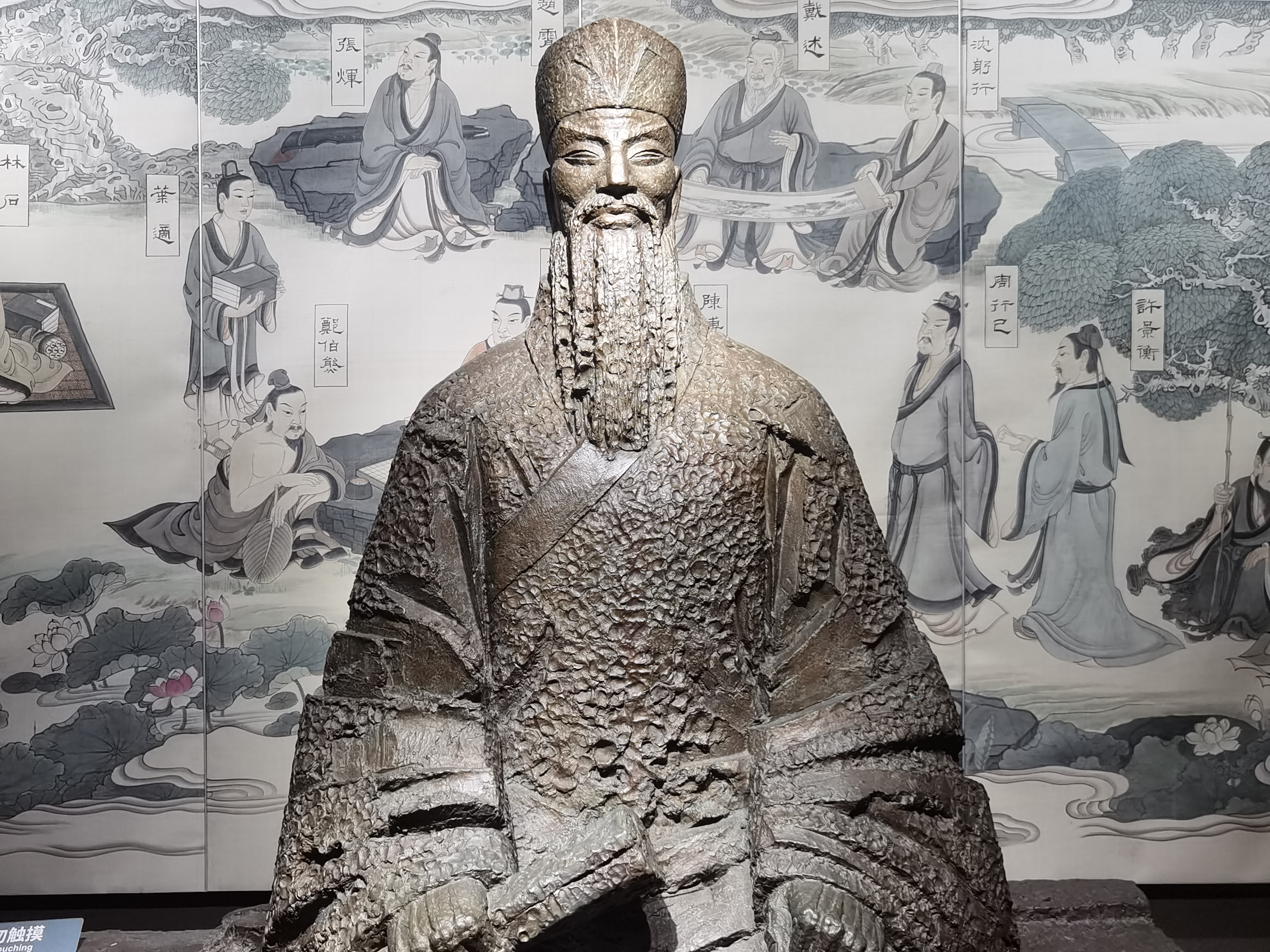
A statue of Ye Shi

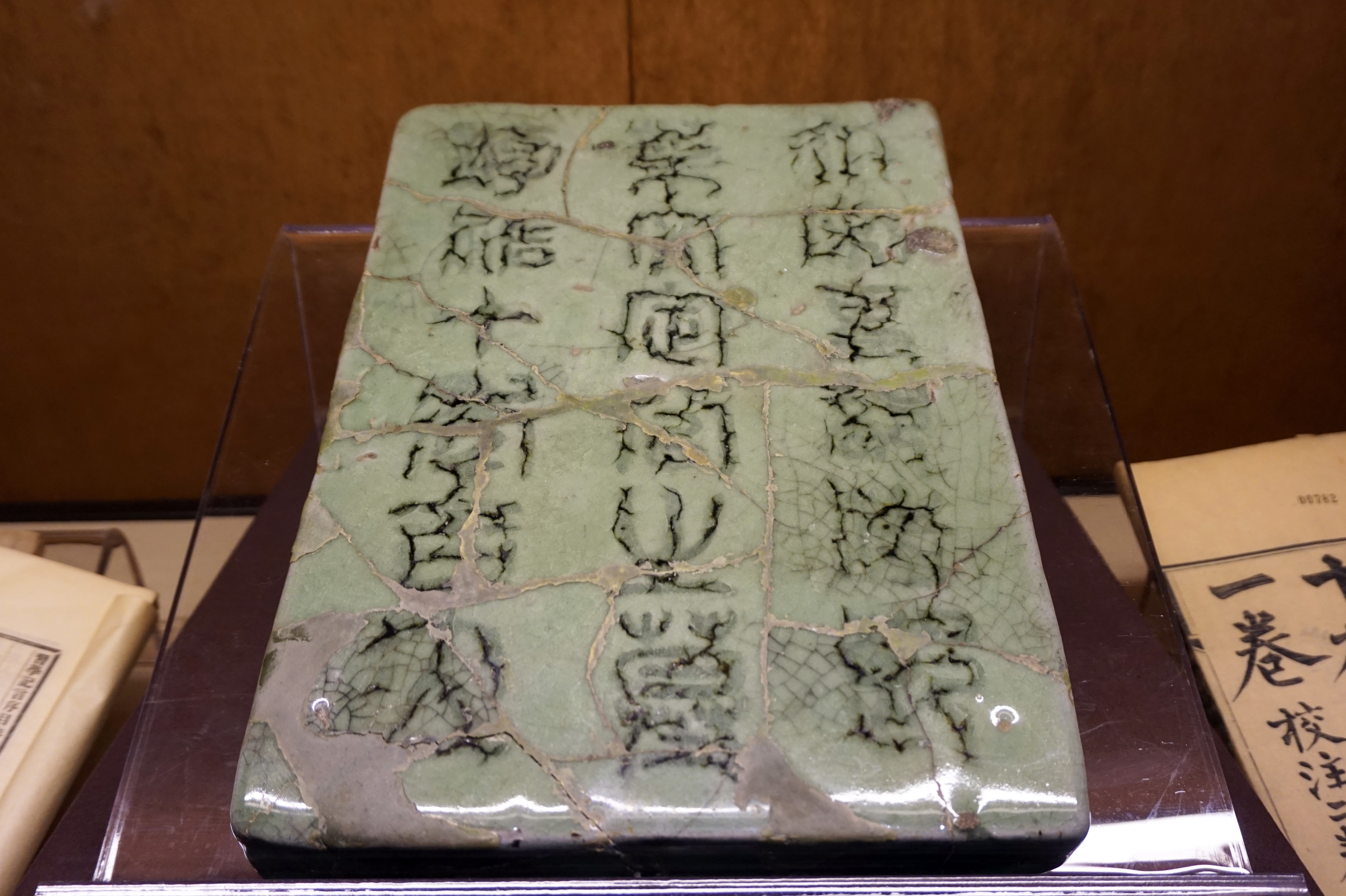
Longquan celadon epitaph of Ye Shi, dated to the tenth year of the Chunyou era (1250) of the Southern Song Dynasty

Ye Shi (simplified Chinese: 叶适; traditional Chinese: 葉適; pinyin: Yè Shì; Wade–Giles: Yeh Shih, 1150–1223), courtesy name Zhengze (正则), pseudonym Mr. Shuixin (水心先生), was a Chinese neo-Confucian of the Song dynasty.

A native of Wenzhou, Zhejiang, he was the most famous figure of the Yongjia School, a neo-Confucianism School composed mostly of philosophers from today Wenzhou Prefecture in Zhejiang province. In contrast to other scholars in the same period like Zhu Xi and Lu Jiuyuan, he stressed practical learning and applying Confucian doctrine to real world problems. This school had important influence on later thinkers from Zhejiang province, including Wang Shouren and Huang Zongxi, who were the most important philosophers in the Ming and Qing periods.

== Biography ==
Ye Shi was born in 1150 and, in 1178, earned his jinshi degree. At the age of 28, he was placed second place in the civil service examinations.

In Huaixi, Ye became a legal advisor and iron and salt supervisor. He also served as prefect of Qizhou, prefect of Jiankang (now Nanjing), and Director of Studies in the Directorate of Education during the reign of the Southern Song dynasty. Despite his philosophical differences with Zhu Xi, Ye wrote a letter to the imperial court in support of Zhu against accusations of political motives in 1188. By 1190s, the Yongjia School experienced difficulties following the abdication of Emperor Xiaozong. During the reign of Emperor Ningzong, Ye was labeled as a "factionalist" and part of the "heretic scholar faction". Due to this, he lost his office in government. His works were also banned by the government.

=== Jin–Song wars ===
As a politician, Ye pushed for a war to reclaim northern China taken by the Jurchen Jin. When Counsellor-in-chief Han Tuozhou launched a poorly planned attack against the Jurchens, Ye was put in charge of defending Jiankang. He successfully repelled the Jin forces attacking the city which helped the Song dynasty endure. Following the Song dynasty's defeat in the north expedition in 1207, he retired from politics. Han was labeled as a traitor and executed while Ye experienced political struggles and was under suspicion of being a collaborator. After retiring from politics, he then returned to his hometown and worked as a private teacher.

== Economic views ==
Throughout his philosophical career, Ye Shi was mostly described as a utilitarian. This reputation of his was cemented due to criticisms by Zhu Xi to the Yongjia School. As opposed to Western utilitarianism, which concerned itself in establishing as the universal moral calculus, Ye's focus on utility was mostly concern on his dissatisfaction to abstract morality. He once argued that "righteousness without utility is just useless, empty talk." In his political philosophy, he favored empirical effectiveness over metaphysical speculation. Ye wrote numerous articles and extensive discussions on topics such as finances, government organization, and the military. His approach towards tackling issues of the state caused puzzlement among Southern Song government officials.

Ye Shi criticized the expansion of fiscal apparatus by the Song dynasty and advocated for fiscal conservatism deeming the expansion as morally bankrupt "exploitation" and "money grubbing". However, many Confucian moralists were sanguine regarding to this topic. Similar to Chen Fuliang, Ye opposed fiscal centralization while emphasizing the conducive role of rich people in society. He believed that wealthy individuals were essential for the nation's finances and that usury helped support the population. In addition, he also criticized the Song government for infringing on the rights of business people through direct control of industries.

He also seemed to support Wang Anshi's stance between distinguishing "li cai" (the proper managing of government finances) and "yan li" (accumulating material gain) despite Ye's criticism that Wang's actual policies had crossed the line into "yan li".

=== Righteousness–profit debate ===
During the Song and Ming dynasties, the righteousness-profit debate (yili zhibian) was advanced by Neo-Confucian scholars to a metaphysical level, framing the relationship between moral principle and material interest as fundamentally oppositional. This orthodox position, most prominently represented by Zhu Xi, subordinated profit to righteousness and regarded commerce as morally inferior. Ye criticized the traditional opposition between righteousness and benefit, advocating their combination as complementary rather than contradictory principles. This view later influenced Chinese philosophers such as Yan Yuan.

=== Monetary theory ===
All of the world's food and beverage resources are from money, from two to one, and much more. All are made of money. From the use of the court, from the private transfer of Gong, the county party committee, merchant trade, all make use of money, so the future generations of money are a hundred times greater than the former...

— Ye Shi, Coins II (c. 12th century)

During a time of opposition against the adoption of paper money, Ye introduced a view of money which emphasized its role as a medium of exchange created by merchants for trade. Ye argued that during the age of sage-kings, people were self-sufficient, producing all necessary goods. As societies became more complex, a division of labor emerged, leading to a need for exchange and the use of money as a measure of value. This transition allowed various commodities to be quantified: cloth in feet and inches, grain in pecks and bushels. The establishment of the Qin and Han empires significantly expanded trade, with coinage becoming the preferred medium of exchange due to its convenience. By the end of the Former Han dynasty, precious materials like jade and gold were primarily ornamental. Ye believed that a stable currency system was not realized until the Tang dynasty began minting the Kaiyuan coin in 621. His review of monetary history differs with the cartalist view in the Guanzi.

In contrast with his contemporaries, Ye emphasized the importance of money being in circulation and overlooked its role as a means of storage. He stated that money and goods only show their value when they are used and questioned the usefulness of money that is stored away, as it cannot facilitate trade or exchanges. He also argued that the problems with paper currency in his time supported his belief in the value of metal money. Rich people and the state kept coins due to their intrinsic value. The increase of paper money led to less coins in circulation and caused inflation, which hurt incomes and production. Ye suggested ending paper currency to restore reliable coin use.

His financial expositions were to be found in his texts such as the "The Financial Planner" (1182) and "Coins II", which details his views on the dynamics between currency and commodities.

== Works ==
Some of his important surviving works of Ye Shi include:

=== Collections ===
- Shuixin wenji (水心文集)
- Shuixin bieji (水心別集)

=== Books ===
- Xuexi jiyan xumu (習學紀言序目)
