= Edict attendant =

- Chinese: 待制
Transcriptions
Standard Mandarin
- Hanyu Pinyin: dàizhì
- Wade–Giles: tai-chih

Edict attendants or Daizhi, also translated as Rescriptor-in-waiting or Academician-in-waiting, were literari in the Tang dynasty (618–907) and Song dynasty (960–1279), responsible for taking notes on imperial pronouncements during the emperor's meetings with officials.

In Tang dynasty they were members of the Academy of Scholarly Worthies. In Song dynasty they were members of the Hanlin Academy.

Bao Zheng (999–1062) had been an edict attendant (of the Shengtianzhang Pavilion), and in popular fiction is sometimes referred to as "Edict Attendant Bao" or "Bao Daizhi". Stephen H. West and Wilt L. Idema translated the title as "Rescriptor-in-waiting Bao".
