= Peter Chan (businessman) =

Hong Kong businessman

Peter Chan Chun-chuen 陳振聰
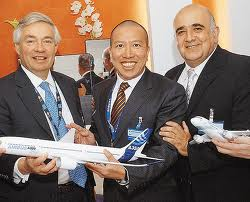
- Born: 23 December 1959 (age 66)
- Education: Colégio Mateus Ricci
- Spouse: Tam Miu-ching (譚妙清)
- Parent: Patrick Chan Yu-nam (陳汝楠)

Peter Chan Chun-chuen (formerly Tony Chan)
- Traditional Chinese: 陳振聰
- Simplified Chinese: 陈振聪
Transcriptions
Standard Mandarin
- Hanyu Pinyin: Chén Zhèncōng

Peter Chan Chun-chuen (born 23 December 1959), earlier known as Tony Chan, is a Hong Kong businessman and the former Feng shui geomancer to the late Nina Wang, who at the time of her death was chair of Chinachem Group and Asia's richest woman. He laid claim to Wang's HK$83 billion estate after she died from ovarian cancer in 2007, claiming to have been her lover.

== Personal life and business activities ==
Chan was born in Hong Kong with family roots in Xinhui, Guangdong. He is a partial owner, along with Wang's estate, of RCG Holdings Limited (LSE: RCG, SEHK: 802), a biometrics and RFID solution provider which was listed on the Hong Kong Stock Exchange in February 2009. He is married to Tam Miu-chung; their first child, Wealthee Chan, was born in 1993. In March 2013, Tony Chan was baptised as a Christian and took the name Peter Chan on the occasion of his conversion. He stated that he began considering conversion when his driver quit in 2012 and gave him a Bible as a parting gift. He also indicated that he would no longer practise feng shui after his conversion.

== Estate battle ==
After Nina Wang's death in 2007, Chan presented a 2006 document purporting to be her last will and testament, which left all of her assets to him. This would have been a complete reversal of Wang's earlier 2002 will, in which she stated that she wished to bequeath her fortune to Chinachem Charitable Foundation, a trust run by her family. On 2 February 2010, the Hong Kong High Court ruled that Wang's estate belonged to the Foundation and not to Chan.

Justice Johnson Lam said Chan was "untruthful, unreliable and lacking in credibility". He further stated: "I do not find him to be a credible witness and I find in many respects his evidence was tailored to suit his convenience. I do not believe what he testified regarding the provenance of the 2006 will. Apart from my general assessment of his credibility, I also find his evidence incredible."

The judge found Wang's signature on the 2006 will relied on by Tony Chan to be "a highly skilled simulation", on the basis of which the Hong Kong Police arrested Tony Chan the next day.

He was released on HK$5 million (US$640,000) bail. Hong Kong's Inland Revenue Department issued a demand for HK$300 million in back taxes on income he is alleged to have received from Wang for feng shui services, sums which Chan claims were gifts from his lover.

== Criminal case ==
On 4 July 2013, Chan was convicted of two criminal fraud charges in a jury trial. He was convicted of forging the will and of using a false document by majority verdicts. He was sentenced to 12 years in prison. He filed for leave to appeal against his conviction the following week.
