= Nina Wang =

Hong Kong entrepreneur (1937-2007)

- Born: Kung Yu Sum; 29 September 1936; Shanghai, Republic of China
- Died: 3 April 2007 (aged 70); Hong Kong, China
- Spouse: Teddy Wang (m.1955, missing in 1990, declared legally dead in 1999)

Nina Wang
- Traditional Chinese: 龔如心
- Simplified Chinese: 龚如心
Transcriptions
Standard Mandarin
- Hanyu Pinyin: Gōng Rúxīn
- Wade–Giles: Kung Ju-hsin
Yue: Cantonese
- Jyutping: gung1 jyu4 sam1

Nina Wang, born Kung Yu Sum (Chinese: 龔如心; pinyin: Gōng Rúxīn; 29 September 1936 – 3 April 2007), was Asia's richest woman, with an estimated net worth of US$4.2 billion at the time of her death. She was the widow of Hong Kong chemical magnate Teddy Wang, who was kidnapped and disappeared in 1990.

== Early life ==
Kung Yu Sum was born in Shanghai to parents from Wenzhou, and was a childhood playmate of Teddy Wang, whose father Wang Din-shin, a Wenzhounese businessman, established a paint and chemical business. The Wangs moved to Hong Kong, and the business became the Chinachem Group, eventually one of Hong Kong's largest and most powerful companies based on a lucrative pharmaceutical division. In 1948, when she was 11 and he 15, they renewed their friendship, and in 1955 they married.

Nicknamed "Little Sweetie" ("Siu Tim Tim" or "小甜甜" in Cantonese), she was noted for her two pigtails and her love of dressing in traditional Chinese dresses. At the time of her death, she was the richest woman in Asia and the world's 35th richest person, with a fortune of $4.2bn, according to Forbes magazine, a fortune which exceeded that of American talk show host Oprah Winfrey.

== Kidnappings ==
On 12 April 1983, the Wangs' Mercedes was hijacked. Teddy Wang was taken away and chained to a bed for eight days until Nina Wang paid a $33 million ransom. On 10 April 1990, Teddy Wang was kidnapped again and not recovered. After his disappearance, Nina took the helm of Chinachem under the title of "Chairlady" and built it into a major property developer.

== Contested wills ==
Teddy Wang's body was never found, and he was declared dead in 1999. At that point, the battle over his fortune began, with at least three different wills circulating in the court system. The earliest will, the authenticity of which is not contested, was dated 1960 and split the estate equally between Teddy's wife Nina, and his father, Wang Din-shin. A 1968 version produced by Din-shin (authenticity challenged) gave the entire estate to Din-shin. This will was made after Teddy discovered that his wife was having an affair.

A 1990 will (dated a month before Teddy's abduction) ceded the entire estate to Nina and included the phrase "one life, one love", in English, with the rest of the will in Chinese, stating that the Wang family was disappointing. This will had a signature indicating it was witnessed by the family butler. On 21 November 2002, after a 171-day courtroom battle featuring some of Hong Kong's most prominent lawyers and Wang Din-shin accusing Nina of adultery, High Court Justice David Yam declared the 1990 will a forgery and awarded all of Teddy Wang's estimated $128 million estate to Wang Din-shin. Nina appealed the ruling but lost in a 2–1 decision on 28 June 2004. The money was handed over to Wang Din-shin.

On 28 January 2005, Nina Wang was formally charged with the forgery and freed on bail. On 16 September 2005, the Court of Final Appeal overturned the previous High Court ruling, giving control of the multibillion-dollar Chinachem firm back to Mrs. Wang. On 2 December 2005, prosecutors in the fraud case officially dropped all charges, effectively exonerating Wang.

== Death ==
On 4 April 2007, Chinachem announced that Wang died at the Hong Kong Sanatorium and Hospital the previous day. Although the cause of death has not been disclosed, there have been reports suggesting that she might have been suffering from ovarian cancer.

On 13 April 2007, Chinachem confirmed in various Hong Kong local newspapers that Wang was first diagnosed with an undisclosed illness back in February 2004. She immediately flew to the United States to receive further treatment at Brigham and Women's Hospital, which is affiliated with Harvard University. She received treatment for more than three years before her death.

== Controversy over cause of death ==
In an interview with Apple Daily, published on 8 April 2007, Hong Kong shipping tycoon Cecil Chao criticized gambling magnate Stanley Ho, who claimed that Wang's death was a consequence of her being parsimonious. Chao, who had known Wang for 40 years, revealed that the High Court ruling that went against Wang, and the subsequent forgery accusation, had taken a severe toll on Wang's health. Chao paid tribute to Wang, who recalled "In Little Sweetie (Wang's nickname), you just could not feel at all the arrogance of a billionaire, she did not like to be overly in the spotlight, she was a very humble person, very low key and also very astute".

On 8 April 2007, the Kung family announced they had drawn up a list of 45 people who would be members of the 'funeral arrangement committee'. In what some regard as an obvious snub, Mr. Ho was not invited to be a member of that committee.

== Estate concern and development ==
On 8 April 2007, Hong Kong newspaper Sunday Morning Post reported that Wang named one individual as the sole beneficiary in her will, according to her lawyer Jonathan Midgley. Contrary to previous reports, Midgley also dismissed claims that her will dictated that her fortune was to go to charity.

On 9 April 2007, Hong Kong newspaper Apple Daily reported that the Kung family insisted that Nina Wang wished to use the largest portion of her multi-billion dollar estate to set up a charity fund for medical and education developments in mainland China. According to the report, the Kung family members held an 'emergency meeting' after learning of Midgley's statement. Apple Daily also describes Midgley's client as a 'mysterious person'. Midgley refused to comment whether he had any involvement in processing Wang's will.

The day after her funeral, two wills she allegedly wrote in 2002 and 2006 were published separately in Next Magazine and its sister publication, Apple Daily. The 2002 document gave Wang's fortune to her charitable trust. But the later version named her personal feng shui consultant, Tony Chan Chun-chuen, as the beneficiary.

Following a lengthy court battle over Wang's estate, the court ruled on 2 February 2010 that, while the court accepted Tony Chan's claim that he and Wang had been secret lovers, the alleged 2006 will presented by Chan bore a forged signature. The court upheld the 2002 will awarding Wang's entire estate to the ChinaChem Charitable Foundation. Chan declared his intent to appeal, but the following day his home was searched by the police and he was arrested for questioning on suspicion of forgery.

== See also ==
- Nina Tower – The tower Nina Wang planned and developed for her and her husband Teddy.
