= Yongjia School =

Chinese school of thought during the Song Dynasty

Yongjia School of Confucianism (simplified Chinese: 永嘉学派; traditional Chinese: 永嘉學派; pinyin: Yǒngjiā Xuépài) was a Chinese school of thought that advocated for privatization, market economy, pragmatism, free trade, tax cut, and challenged other schools of Confucianism. It became one of the three dominant schools of thought during the Song Dynasty along with "Li School of Thought" led by Zhu Xi and "Universal Mind School of Thought" led by Lu Jiuyuan. Particularly, it was a leading force that gave rise to the economic prosperity of Song Dynasty in China and has close ties to the prosperity of market economy and private economy during the period.

The Yongjia School of Thought emerged in response to the social and political crises in southern Song, specifically the attempt on the part of Zhu Xi and Lu Jiuyuan to establish their authority over Confucian Classics and was aggravated by the military threat from the northern Jin and the corruption in the government. The school itself was named after Yongjia, now called Wenzhou, and composed mainly of scholars from Wenzhou (then Yongjia). It began with the need to contend with the changing intellectual climate and was initiated by the Yongjia scholars such as Zhou Xingji and Xue Jixuan. It was further promoted by the materialist thinkers Ye Shi (1150–1223) and Chen Liang (1143–1194), who elevated the social status of those people who engaged in commercial and merchant activities. Ye Shi is noted for amending the mainstream Confucian ideology by focusing more on business, rejecting the ideas such as the giving of high priority to justice and low priority to profit. The school finally evolved into a unique school of thought in Chinese history, advocating for the importance of commerce, privatization, market economy, free trade, currency market while China by tradition values agriculture, concepts, and thoughts that were distinctly different.

== See also ==
Neo-Confucianism
