= Chinachem =

Hong Kong real estate developer

Chinachem Group

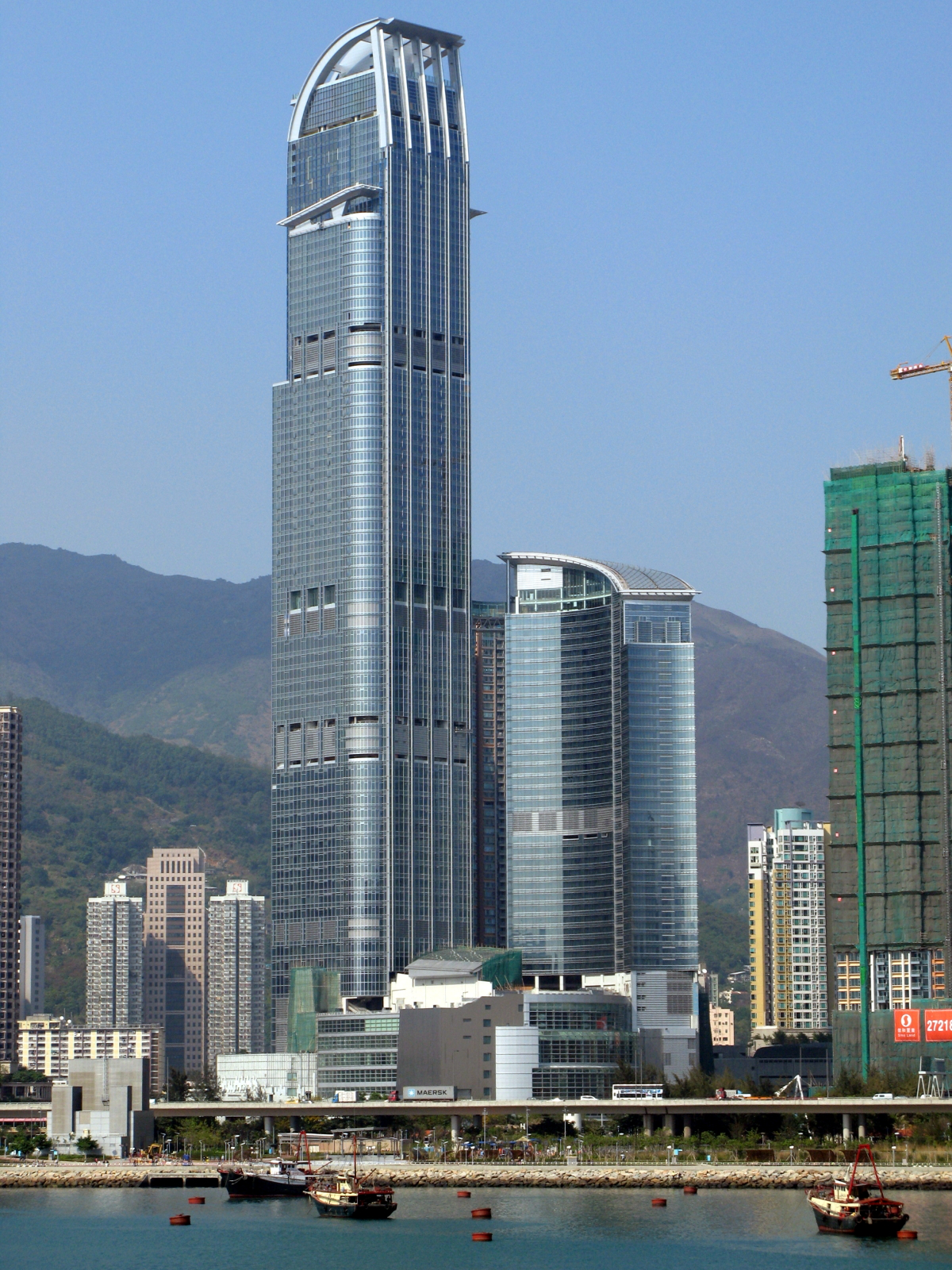
- Headquarters at the Nina Tower
- Native name: 華懋集團
- Type: Private
- Industry: Conglomerate
- Founded: Before 1960s
- Headquarters: 35-38/F, Nina Tower 2, No.8 Yeung Uk Road, Tsuen Wan, Hong Kong
- Key people: Wang Din Sin (王廷歆), Teddy Wang, Nina Wang, Kung Yan-sum
- Products: Real estate, Entertainment, Hotel and Investment
- Website: www.chinachemgroup.com

Chinachem
- Traditional Chinese: 華懋集團
- Simplified Chinese: 华懋集团
Transcriptions
Standard Mandarin
- Hanyu Pinyin: Huàmào Jítuán
Yue: Cantonese
- Jyutping: waa^{4} mau^{6} zaap^{6} tyun^{4}

Chinachem Group (Chinese: 華懋集團) is a corporate group established in Hong Kong by Teddy Wang's father Wang Din Sin (王廷歆).

The early years of the group were dedicated to exploration of and investment in agricultural projects and chemicals. In the 1960s, the Group shifted its focus to the property development, and has been one of the largest property developers in Hong Kong since mid-1970s.

After Teddy Wang's kidnapping and disappearance in 1990, his wife Nina Wang took over the company as the "Chairlady" and built it into a major property developer, making her the richest woman in Asia.

After the death of Nina Wang, her brother Kung Yan-sum once served as the Acting Chairman of the Group.

Now, the Group is overseen by the Board of Directors of Chinachem Group Holdings Limited, which comprises the following: Chairman & Independent Non-Executive Director: Peter Brien; Executive Directors: Andy Cheung, Wong Hung Han, and Ricky Tsang; Non-Executive Directors: Alvin Wong, Victor Jong and Ted Osborn. The Board committees include Audit and Risk Committee, Strategic Investment Committee and Remuneration Committee.

In June 2024, Chinachem Group was among ten companies to receive the (Building and Construction Information) BCI Asia Top 10 Developers Award.

== Property and hotels ==
The Chinachem Group has built over 300 tower blocks in Hong Kong, the most famous of which is Nina Tower, in Tsuen Wan, where the head office is.

The following are some of Chinachem Group's completed developments:

- Residential: Villa Cove, Sol City, Serenity Point, Parc City, Parc Inverness, The Papillons, Serenity Peak, Jade Grove, Eden Gate, The Golden Gate, The Lily, Residence 228, Billionnaire Avant, Billionnaire Royale, South Crest, University Heights, Victoria Coast, ECHO HOUSE, etc
- Shopping Malls: NINA MALL, D•PARK, Lucky Plaza, Papillons Square, Fanling Town Centre, Hilton Plaza, Ho Shun Fook Shopping Centre, etc
- Office: Nina Tower, Chinachem Tower, Chinachem Hollywood Tower, etc
- Hotel: Nina Hotel Tsuen Wan West, Nina Hotel Island South, Nina Hotel Causeway Bay, Nina Hotel Kowloon East, Lodgewood by Nina Hospitality, etc

== Listing ==
The Chinachem Group is privately owned. The Group has been seeking a listing since 1988 but is currently not listed in any stock markets. It was also rumoured that Group might inject assets into its listed affiliates like Enm Holdings Limited and Dan Form Holdings Company Limited in recent years.
