= Teddy Wang =

Hong Kong businessman (1933-disappeared 1990)

- Born: Wang Teh-huei; 9 September 1934; Shanghai, Republic of China
- Disappeared: 10 April 1990 (aged 55); British Hong Kong
- Status: Missing for 36 years, 5 months and 7 days, declared dead in absentia in 1999
- Occupation: Founder of Chinachem Group
- Spouse: Nina Wang (m. 1955)
- Parents: Wang Din-shin (father); Yam Yuk-chen (mother)

Teddy Wang Teh-huei
- Traditional Chinese: 王德輝
- Simplified Chinese: 王德辉
Transcriptions
Standard Mandarin
- Hanyu Pinyin: Wáng Déhuī
- Wade–Giles: Wang Te-hui
Yue: Cantonese
- Jyutping: wong4 dak1 fai1

Teddy Wang Teh-huei (Chinese: 王德輝; 9 September 1933 – missing since 10 April 1990) was a Hong Kong businessman and founder of the Chinachem Group who was kidnapped for ransom in 1990, and later declared legally dead. His wife, Nina Wang, later launched a lengthy legal battle over her husband's will.

== Life and career ==
Teddy Wang was born in Shanghai, China to Wenzhounese parents, the son of paint and chemical business proprietor Wang Din-shin. He was a childhood playmate of Kung Yu Sam (Nina Wang). In 1948, when she was 11 and he was 15, they renewed their friendship, and they married in 1955. The Wangs moved to Hong Kong, and the business became the Chinachem Group, eventually becoming one of the territory's largest and most powerful companies due to its lucrative pharmaceutical division.

== Kidnapping and death in absentia ==
Wang was abducted on 12 April 1983, when his Mercedes-Benz was hijacked. He was taken away and chained to a bed for eight days until Nina Wang paid a ransom of HK$33 million.

Wang was kidnapped again on 10 April 1990 as he left the Jockey Club in Hong Kong. His abductors demanded HK$60 million. His wife Nina paid an installment of $34 million, but Wang was not returned. Several of the alleged kidnappers were caught and said that the 56-year-old Wang had been thrown into the sea from a sampan on 13 April. His body was never found and he was declared legally dead in 1999. Wang's will was disputed by Nina, the eventual chief beneficiary. According to Nina's personal assistant, she had received phone calls from Teddy up to the year 2000.

== See also ==
- Crime Story, based on his final kidnapping
- List of people who disappeared mysteriously (2000–present)
