= Bidvest Wits F.C. =

Bidvest Wits
- Full name: Bidvest Wits Football Club
- Nicknames: The Clever Boys, The Students
- Founded: 1921
- Dissolved: 2020
- Ground: Bidvest Stadium
- Capacity: 5,000
- Coach: Gavin Hunt (last coach)
- League: Premiership
- 2019–20: 4th
Home colours	Away colours

Bidvest Wits Football Club (simply often known as Wits University F.C. or Wits) was a South African professional football club from Johannesburg which played in the Premiership the first-tier of South African league football system. It was nicknamed "The Clever Boys" or "The Students" because of the close affiliation with the University of the Witwatersrand.

The club was sold at the conclusion of the 2019–20 Premiership season. This after Bidvest confirmed that it had reached an agreement for the sale of the club's top-flight status to Tshakhuma Tsha Madzivhandila (TTM).

== History ==
The club has its roots at Wits University in Johannesburg, where it was formed in 1921 by the university's Students Representatives Council. The club competed in a variety of tournaments and leagues before eventually winning promotion to the National Football League in 1975 – then South Africa's top domestic league.

During the 1970s the club produced some of South Africa's finest players – amongst them goalkeeper Gary Bailey, who went on to play for Manchester United and England and defender Richard Gough, who later played for Dundee United, Rangers, Everton and Scotland.

The club won their first major title in 1978 – winning the Mainstay Cup after beating Kaizer Chiefs in the final of the competition. Six years later they picked up the BP Top 8, and a year later in 1985 they again beat Chiefs, this time in the final of the JPS Knockout Cup. The club finished 6th in the inaugural NSL season in 1985 while Scottish striker Frank McGrellis was crowned the league's top scorer with a total of 29 league and cup goals.

The 1990s saw mixed fortunes for the team. They won two trophies, the BP Top 8 and the Coca-Cola Cup in 1995 under coach John Lathan. But a year later they dropped dangerously close to being relegated from the newly formed Premiership – only surviving thanks to a spirited win on the final day of the season against Jomo Cosmos.

Mid-table finishes followed in 1997 and 1998 before the club finished sixth in 1999–00 – helped largely by the inspirational form of centre back Peter Gordon, who played over 400 times for the club and won caps for Bafana Bafana (the South African National Team), and Sam Magalefa who finished as the club's top goalscorer.

In 2000–01 the club finished a disappointing 13th under new Scottish coach Jim Bone. A year later former Bafana Bafana goalkeeper Roger De Sa was appointed head coach, and he immediately restored order with the club finishing 7th in the PSL in 2002, thanks to a 3–1 victory on the final day of the season over Orlando Pirates.

Under De Sa's reign things appeared to be looking up for Wits, with the club securing third-placed finishes in the PSL in 2003 and again in 2004. But in 2005 things took a turn for the worse, as De Sa's ultra-defensive tactics, coupled with a mass player exodus at the start of the season, saw the side score just 24 goals in 30 league matches to finish bottom of the league.

At the start of the 2005–06 season, former Santos Cape Town and Maritzburg United coach Boebie Solomons was appointed as head coach, and Solomons' first season in charge brought a return to the PSL for the Clever Boys, with the club comfortably winning the Mvela Golden League (the second tier of South African football) after starting the season with six successive victories.

In June 2007 Roger De Sa rejoined the club after a two-year absence. He replaced caretaker Eric Tinkler who succeeded Boebie Solomons during the 2006–07 season.

In 2010 Wits managed to win the Nedbank Cup defeating AmaZulu in the final.

=== 2014–2017 ===
2014–2017 were the most successful years in Wit's history. They finished in the top 3 in the Premiership for four consecutive years, and the 2016–17 season saw Wits win their first Premiership title. Wits finished the season with 18 wins, 6 draws and 6 losses, and won the league by three points in a tightly contested season. They also won the 2016 MTN 8 (beating 2016 CAF Champions League winners Mamelodi Sundowns) and the 2017 Telkom Knockout.

== Honours ==
=== Domestic competitions ===
- Premiership
  - Winners: 2016–17
- Nedbank Cup
  - Winners (2): 1978, 2010
- Telkom Knockout
  - Winners (3): 1985, 1995, 2017
- MTN 8
  - Winners (3): 1984, 1995, 2016
- National First Division
  - Winners (1): 2005–06

== Notable former coaches ==
- (England) Mike Kenning
- (South Africa) Julie Kaplan
- (England) Eddie Lewis (1974–79)
- (Scotland) Joe Frickleton (1986)
- (England) Terry Paine (1987–88)
- (England) John Lathan
- (Scotland) Jim Bone (2000–01)
- (South Africa) Roger De Sa (2001–05)
- (South Africa) Boebie Solomons (1 July 2005 – 10 March 2007)
- (South Africa) Roger De Sa (1 July 2007 – 9 July 2012)
- (Spain) Antonio López Habas (12 July 2012 – 4 Jan 2013)
- (South Africa) Clive Barker (7 Jan 2013 – 28 May 2013)
- (South Africa) Gavin Hunt (28 May 2013 – 5 September 2020)

== Club records ==
- Most starts: (South Africa) Peter Gordon 415
- Most goals: (South Africa) Peter Gordon 55
- Most capped player: (Zimbabwe) Charles Yohane 268 (1997–2006)
- Most starts in a season: (Scotland) Andy Geddes 46 (1986)
- Most goals in a season: (Scotland) Frank McGrellis 29 (1985)
- Record victory: 14–0 v Cardiff City (16 September 1986, Mainstay Cup)
- Record defeat: 1–6 vs Kaizer Chiefs (14 October 1990, NSL)

=== League record ===
==== National Soccer League ====
- 1985 – 6th
- 1986 – 8th
- 1987 – 9th
- 1988 – 7th
- 1989 – 7th
- 1990 – 9th
- 1991 – 11th
- 1992 – 3rd
- 1993 – 16th
- 1994 – 7th
- 1995 – 11th

==== Premiership ====
- 1996–97 – 12th
- 1997–98 – 8th
- 1998–99 – 11th
- 1999–2000 – 6th
- 2000–01 – 13th
- 2001–02 – 7th
- 2002–03 – 3rd
- 2003–04 – 4th
- 2004–05 – 16th (relegated)

==== National First Division ====
- 2005–06 – 16th (promoted)

==== Premiership ====
- 2006–07 – 13th
- 2007–08 – 12th
- 2008–09 – 6th
- 2009–10 – 10th
- 2010–11 – 6th
- 2011–12 – 12th
- 2012–13 – 4th
- 2013–14 – 3rd
- 2014–15 – 3rd
- 2015–16 – 2nd
- 2016–17 – 1st
- 2017–18 – 13th
- 2018–19 - 3rd
- 2019–20 - 4th
