= NSL Second Division =

- Founded: 1985
- Folded: 1995
- Country: South Africa
- Level on pyramid: Level 2
- Promotion to: NSL Castle League
- Most championships: African Wanderers (2 titles); Cape Town Spurs (2 titles)

The NSL Second Division (also referred to as the OK League for sponsorship reasons), was a South African association football league. It was the second tier on the South African football league system, and teams who won the division, were promoted to the NSL Castle League.

== History ==
Already in 1978, there was a merger of the topflight NFL and NPSL, to form the first non-racial division for the First Level of South African football. The new common topflight league, was named NPSL Castle League in 1978–84, and renamed to NSL Castle League in 1985–95. In the early years from 1978 to 1986, relegation/promotion to and from the topflight non-racial football league, according to official records actually did happen, but apparently it still happened from a Second Level league structure, divided into whites/blacks/coloureds.

The NSL Second Division began in 1985 as a feeder to the then top tier National Soccer League. In March 1987, the naming rights of the division were sold to South African Breweries who also sponsored the NSL's top-tier league with their Castle Lager brand (the top tier was known as the Castle League), the competition was titled the OK League after the brewery's bazaar chain "OK Bazaars".

It is claimed by the Premier Soccer League that the division was the first non-racial Second Level of South African football. Teams were promoted to the NSL Castle League from the Second Division, and those relegated from the Castle League would compete in the Second Division the following season.

The competition was originally an individual league table (referred to as a "log" in South Africa) but in 1990, it was felt that the league was becoming too expensive to run and it was decided that the competition should be split into regions. As a result, the number of teams increased from 17 in a single league to 40 divided into two divisions (known as "streams"). These divisions were named "O" and "K" as part of the title sponsor's marketing campaign.

In 1995 the league was diluted further and developed into four geographical streams (Northern, Southern, Eastern Cape/Natal and Western Cape), each comprising 19 clubs. In the space of six years the number of participating teams had risen from 17 to 76.

When the National Soccer League competition was rebranded in 1996, the organizers also replaced the NSL Second Division. It became the new National First Division. Apart from a new name and a better sponsor deal, the most significant change -both at the First and Second Level- was to change the fixture schedule from yearly seasons, into the more commonly used International standard of September–May seasons.

== History ==
Season	Winner (promoted to NSL)	Also promoted to NSL
NSL Second Division
1985	QwaQwa Stars	Klerksdorp City
1986	Leeds United	PE Blackpool
OK League
1987	Cape Town Spurs	Umtata Bush Bucks, Natal United
1988	Mighty Blackpool	Vaal Reef Stars
1989	Umtata Bush Bucks	Halls Dynamos, Pretoria City
1990	African Wanderers	Highlands Park FC (Note: As a result of the NSL merger with FPL, the six highest ranked FPL teams: Real Taj, Tongaat Crusaders United, Bosmont Chelsea, Santos, Manning Rangers and Dangerous Darkies were also promoted to the NSL Castle League for the 1991 season.)
1991	Cape Town Spurs	Ratanang Mahlosians
1992	Vaal Professionals	D'Alberton Callies
1993	Real Rovers	Royal Tigers
1994	African Wanderers	Jomo Cosmos and Rabali Blackpool
NSL Second Division
Year	Winners	Region
1995	Camps Bay	Western Cape
1995	Pretoria City (Promoted)	Northern Transvaal
1995	Crystal Brains (Promoted)	Kwazulu-Natal
1995	Stocks Birds United	Northwest Region
1996	Continued as the National First Division	
