= Walter Rautmann =

Austrian footballer (born 1945)

Personal information
- Date of birth: 30 August 1945 (age 81)
- Place of birth: Paul-Hahn-Straße, Linz, Austria
- Position: Midfielder

Senior career*
Years	Team	Apps	(Gls)
- LASK
1965	Montreal Italica		
1968	Powerlines FC		
1971	Berea Park		
- Highlands Park F.C.
1972–1973	Hertha BSC		
1973	LBV Phönix		
1973	Germiston Callies		
- Moroka Swallows
1975	Dallas Tornado	9	(0)
1976	SK Windhoek		

Managerial career
- AmaZulu
- Rabali Blackpool
- Moroka Swallows
- 2000–2001: African Wanderers
- 2001–2002: Tembisa Classic
- 2003: Black Leopards
- 2003–20xx: Thanda Royal Zulu
- 2006: PJ Stars
- 2006–20xx: Garankuwa United
- 2008–2009: Values Rockets
- 2009–2010: Mbabane Swallows
- 2016: Klerksdorp City FC
- * Club domestic league appearances and goals

Walter Rautmann (born 30 August 1945) is an Austrian retired football coach and player. He has coached Mpumalanga Black Aces, Dangerous Darkies, Real Rovers, Moroka Swallows, Rabali Blackpool, AmaZulu, African Wanderers, Tembisa Classic, Black Leopards, Zulu Royals, PJ Stars, Garankuwa United, Values Rockets, Mbabane Swallows, and amateur Klerksdorp City.

== Career ==
=== In South Africa ===
Before playing in South Africa he played in the Eastern Canada Professional Soccer League in 1965 with Montreal Italica. Unable to secure a contract in the United States, the retired midfielder came to the whites-only South African league with some other Austrians in the 1960s, before completing a switch to Moroka Swallows as player-coach which was the first black team he was in. Since then, he coached only black teams and was dubbed 'Mr Fitness', 'Mr Fixit', the 'Lion of the North' for his preternatural ability to save clubs from relegation. Also, Rautmann helped some South African footballers earn transfers to Austria, the first at the time.

While in charge of Rabali Blackpool, the former footballer was kicked by Gora Ebrahim after he was chosen to be substituted and has not spoken to Ebrahim since.

In 2015, Rautmann was moribund when his heart stopped beating for 20 seconds and had to be revived.

On South African football, he has stated that it is very corrupt.

=== In Swaziland ===
Summoned to take the helm of Mbabane Swallows of the Swazi Premier League near the end of 2009 on a short-term agreement to assist Malian Alou Badara ahead of their CAF Champions League clash encountering SuperSport United, Rautmann arrived in the country by January 2010. However, he complained about the state of Swallows' training pitch upon arrival, blaming the state of the pitch for his team's cup loss to Amagaagasi as well. A month succeeding his appointment, he severed ties with the club, citing a poor relationship with Alou Badara as the reason for his resignation.

== Personal life ==
Marrying his wife Lynn in 1968, the Austrian mentor is fluent in English, Dutch, and Afrikaans. He has a son, Michael, who was born in 1976.
