= David Nyathi =

South African soccer player and coach

Personal information
- Full name: David Sibusiso Nyathi
- Date of birth: 22 March 1969 (age 57)
- Place of birth: Bushbuckridge, South Africa
- Height: 1.73 m (5 ft 8 in)
- Position: Defender

Senior career*
| Years | Team | Apps | (Gls) |
| 1991 | Dangerous Darkies | 45 | (6) |
| 1992–1993 | Orlando Pirates | 31 | (3) |
| 1994–1995 | Cape Town Spurs | 64 | (7) |
| 1996 | Kaizer Chiefs | 15 | (0) |
| 1996–1997 | CD Tenerife | 1 | (0) |
| 1997–1998 | FC St. Gallen | 26 | (1) |
| 1998–2000 | Cagliari Calcio | 6 | (0) |
| 2000 | Ankaragücü | | |

International career
| 1992–1999 | South Africa | 45 | (1) |

Managerial career
- Ajax Cape Town(Assistant)
- * Club domestic league appearances and goals

David Sibusiso Nyathi (born 22 March 1969) is a retired South African soccer player, who is currently the assistant coach at Ajax Cape Town, and previously coached their under-19 team.

== Club career ==
Nyathi started playing professional football as a defender for Dangerous Darkies who were promoted to the National Soccer League for the first time in the 1991 season. They were relegated into obscurity after finishing bottom of the 1992 NSL First Division and Nyathi joined Orlando Pirates, where he was given the nickname "Going Up". He became part of the first Bafana Bafana squad upon the country's return to international football in 1992. He moved on to Cape Town Spurs where he won the league and cup double in 1995. He later moved to Europe where he played for a few teams, including FC St. Gallen (Switzerland), Ankaragücü (Turkey), CD Tenerife (Spain) and Cagliari Calcio (Italy).

== International career ==
Nyathi played for South Africa national soccer team and was part of the squad that travelled to France for the 1998 FIFA World Cup. He was also part of the squad that won the 1996 African Cup of Nations.

== Coaching career ==
Following his retirement, he coached at Cape Town Spurs in a number of roles, including assistant coach, and head coach for the Under 12, Under 15, and Under 19 youth teams. As of 2022, he was coaching the Under 16 team.

== Career statistics ==
=== International ===
Scores and results list South Africa's goal tally first, score column indicates score after each Nyathi goal.

List of international goals scored by David Nyathi
| No. | Date | Venue | Opponent | Score | Result | Competition |
|---|---|---|---|---|---|---|
| 1 | 15 May 2001 | Stade Municipal, Ouagadougou, Burkina Faso | Morocco | 2–1 | 2–1 | 1998 Africa Cup of Nations |
