= 1995 BP Top 8 =

Tournament details
- Teams: 8

Final positions
- Champions: Wits University (2nd title)
- Runners-up: Kaizer Chiefs

The BP Top 8 1995 was the 24th edition of the competition, then known as the BP Top 8 for sponsorship reasons, featuring the top 8-placed teams at the conclusion of the National Soccer League season.

It was won for the second time by Wits University, who defeated Kaizer Chiefs in the final. Wits won a second trophy by defeating Orlando Pirates in the Coca-Cola Cup later that season.

== Teams ==
The following 8 teams are listed according to their final position on the league table in the 1994 NSL.

1. Orlando Pirates
2. Cape Town Spurs
3. Umtata Bucks
4. Mamelodi Sundowns
5. Kaizer Chiefs
6. Hellenic
7. Wits University
8. Qwa Qwa Stars

== Final ==
Wits University	2–0	Kaizer Chiefs
Carnell; Carnell
