= Mpangi Merikani =

Congolese footballer (born 1967)

Personal information
- Date of birth: 4 April 1967 (age 59)
- Place of birth: Kinshasa, DR Congo
- Height: 1.80 m (5 ft 11 in)
- Position: Goalkeeper

Senior career*
Years	Team	Apps	(Gls)
1981–1984	CS Imana		
1985–1993	DC Motema Pembe		
1993–1994	Jomo Cosmos		
1994	Rabali Blackpool		
1995–1997	Real Rovers		
1997–1998	Santos		

International career
1984–1996	Zaire		
- * Club domestic league appearances and goals

Mpangi Merikani (born 4 April 1967) is a Congolese former professional footballer who played as a goalkeeper. He notably played abroad in South Africa. He represented the Zaire national team at international level.

== Club career ==
Born in Kinshasa, Merikani began his career with Cercle Sportif Imana and Daring Club Motema Pembe, where he would win consecutive Congolese national championships from 1983 to 1985. He moved to play in South Africa at the age of 25, signing with Jomo Cosmos. He would spend the rest of his playing career in the South African Premier Soccer League, representing Rabali Blackpool, Real Rovers and Santos.

== International career ==
Merikani played for Zaire at the 1988, 1992 and 1996 Africa Cup of Nations finals.

== Coaching career ==
After he ended his playing career, Merikani became a goalkeeping coach for Jomo Cosmos in 1999.

== Personal life ==
Merikani is the father of Jonathan Bolingi, who is also a professional footballer.
