= Alex Forbes =

Scottish footballer and manager

Personal information
- Full name: Alexander Rooney Forbes
- Date of birth: 21 January 1925
- Place of birth: Dundee, Scotland
- Date of death: 28 July 2014 (aged 89)
- Place of death: Johannesburg, South Africa
- Position: Wing half

Youth career
- Dundee North End

Senior career*
Years	Team	Apps	(Gls)
1944–1948	Sheffield United	61	(6)
1948–1956	Arsenal	240	(20)
1956–1957	Leyton Orient	8	(0)
1957–1958	Fulham	4	(0)

International career
1947–1952	Scotland	14	(0)
- * Club domestic league appearances and goals

Alexander Rooney Forbes (21 January 1925 – 28 July 2014) was a Scottish football player and manager.

== Playing career ==
Forbes was born in Dundee. As a teenager he worked in the dockyards and played junior football for Dundee North End. He signed for English professional club Sheffield United in 1944 and became a first team regular when competitive football resumed after the end of the Second World War. Forbes suffered an injury during the 1947–48 season and lost his place in the Sheffield United first team, which prompted Forbes to ask for a transfer.

Arsenal signed Forbes in March 1948 for a fee of £15,000. The move was encouraged by Forbes' Scotland teammate Archie Macaulay, who subsequently lost his place in the Arsenal team to Forbes. Arsenal won the English league championship in 1947–48 and the FA Cup in 1950. Forbes played an important role in the latter victory, as Arsenal defeated Liverpool 2–0 in the final. Arsenal reached another FA Cup final in 1952, but they lost 1–0 to Newcastle. The club then won another league championship in 1952–53, finishing ahead of Preston on goal average.

Forbes suffered from recurring knee injuries during the 1955–56 season. Arsenal signed Dave Bowen to replace Forbes, who they allowed to leave at the end of the season. Forbes played for Leyton Orient, Fulham and non-league club Gravesend and Northfleet before retiring as a player.

Forbes played 14 times for Scotland from 1947 to 1952. He also represented Scotland at ice hockey.

== Coaching career ==
Forbes returned to Arsenal as a youth team coach. While taking an Arsenal team on a tour of South Africa in 1964, he was offered the opportunity to coach the Wanderers side. Forbes decided to accept and emigrated soon afterwards. Although Wanderers were an all-white club at the time, Forbes also coached black players in township and gold mine teams. He became manager of Orlando Pirates in 1975. His life in South Africa was not dull and saw him coach a few more teams after Pirates. The likes of Rangers, Highlands Park, Western Tigers and Swaraj all in his later years. He also coached football at Yeshiva College for many years. Forbes briefly became coach of the Israeli club Maccabi Haifa and he also worked in Kuwait. He only fully retired from football when he was aged 83, when he had already been diagnosed as suffering from prostate cancer.

== Personal life ==
He loved to play snooker, joining the Wanderers Club in 1964 when he came to South Africa. He won more trophies at the Wanderers tournaments than in his football years, but it just shows that his determination to win was not left behind in England.

He enjoyed greyhound racing and bought and owned the 1953 McAlinden Cup champion Rose of Meath.

He was a teacher at Yeshiva College for 35 years and passed on his knowledge and expertise in football and life skills to many children. In the days after his death, 4,000 former pupils posted messages of condolence on a Facebook memorial page created by Yeshiva College.

He died in his bed in the early hours of 28 July 2014. He was survived by his wife Peggy, who he met at Walthamstow dog track while on an Arsenal players' night out. Forbes was also survived by two children (Bobby and Jan) and three grandchildren - Jason and Andrew (Bobby) and Alex (f)(Jan).

Forbes was the last surviving member from either Arsenal or Liverpool who played in the 1950 FA Cup Final.

== Honours ==
=== Player ===
Sheffield United

- Football League North: 1945–46

Arsenal

- Football League First Division: 1947–48, 1952–53
- FA Cup: 1949–50; runner-up: 1951–52
- FA Charity Shield: 1953

=== Manager ===
Swaraj United

- Soccer Federation Cup: 1977

Rangers Johannesburg

- NSL First Division: 1986
