= Bevan Fransman =

South African footballer (born 1983)

Personal information
- Full name: Bevan Fransman
- Date of birth: 31 October 1983 (age 43)
- Place of birth: Cape Town, South Africa
- Height: 1.87 m (6 ft 2 in)
- Position: Centre back

Team information
- Current team: TS Galaxy

Youth career
- Battswood
- Cape Town Spurs
- FC Fortune

Senior career*
Years	Team	Apps	(Gls)
2000–2001	Mother City	1	(0)
2001–2002	FC Fortune	20	(2)
2002–2003	Mouscron	13	(0)
2003–2006	Kaizer Chiefs	16	(0)
2006–2008	Moroka Swallows	53	(3)
2008–2010	Maccabi Netanya	63	(5)
2010–2012	Hapoel Tel Aviv	43	(1)
2012–2014	SuperSport United	37	(1)
2014–2016	Bloemfontein Celtic	45	(1)
2016–2018	Maritzburg United	54	(2)
2018–2020	Highlands Park	36	(2)
2020–2021	TS Galaxy	21	(2)
2021–2022	Cape Town Spurs	16	(0)

International career
2005–2012	South Africa	19	(0)
- * Club domestic league appearances and goals as of 21 May 2016

Bevan Fransman (born 31 October 1983) is a South African soccer player, currently playing as a centre back for TS Galaxy.

He was in the South Africa squad for the 2008 African Nations Cup.

== Early life ==
Fransman was born in Cape Town, and grew up in the Fairways neighbourhood. His father Paul was also a footballer, having played for St Athens and Battswood.

== Club career ==
Fransman played junior football for Battswood, Cape Town Spurs and FC Fortune. He made one South African Premier Division appearance for Mother City. After playing for FC Fortune in the 2001–02 season, Fransman signed for Belgian First Division club Mouscron alongside fellow FC Fortune players Giovanne Rector and Asanda Sishuba in summer 2002, and made his debut away to Standard Liège on 8 August 2002.

On 28 July 2008 it was announced that Fransman had signed for Maccabi Netanya on a four-year deal.

=== Hapoel Tel Aviv ===
In June 2010, Fransman signed for Israeli side Hapoel Tel Aviv on a three-year contract.

=== SuperSport United ===
He was made captain ahead of the 2013–14 season.

=== Bloemfontein Celtic ===
In June 2014 it was confirmed that Fransman had transferred to Bloemfontein Celtic.

=== Highlands Park ===
In June 2018, Fransman rejected a new Maritzburg United contract and signed for newly promoted Highlands Park. He signed a two-year contract with the club, with Fransman saying that he "got a solid two-year deal" and that "at my age, if you turn that down, you'd be a fool" during his unveiling at the club.

He signed a new short-term deal with Highlands Park in July 2020 until the end of the 2019–20 season, which was prolonged due to the COVID-19 pandemic.

Following the end of the 2019–20 season, Highlands Park's top flight status was sold to TS Galaxy with Fransman's contract initially not renewed, leading to Fransman contemplating retirement in October 2020.

=== Cape Town Spurs ===
In August 2021, Fransman signed for Cape Town Spurs.

== International career ==
In November 2007, Fransman was named in the South Africa squad for the 2008 Africa Cup of Nations.

Fransman was recalled to the national team squad in September 2009 for friendlies against Germany and the Republic of Ireland.

He was added to South Africa's preliminary squad for the 2010 FIFA World Cup in May 2010.

== Honours ==
Hapoel Tel Aviv

- Israel State Cup: 2010–11, 2011–12
