= 1990 NSL First Division =

NSL First Division
- Season: 1990
- Champions: Mamelodi Sundowns
- Relegated: Pilkington United Brothers; Durban Bush Bucks
- Matches: 306
- Goals: 778 (2.54 per match)

The 1990 National Soccer League First Division was the sixth edition of the National Soccer League First Division in South Africa. It was won by Mamelodi Sundowns.

The other professional league, the Federation Professional League, continued to function independently.

== Table ==
Pos	Team	Pld	W	D	L	GF	GA	GD	Pts	Relegation
1	Mamelodi Sundowns (C)	34	23	9	2	63	32	+31	55	
2	Kaizer Chiefs	34	23	7	4	58	22	+36	53	
3	Orlando Pirates	34	19	10	5	65	27	+38	48	
4	Moroka Swallows	34	16	13	5	41	24	+17	45	
5	Jomo Cosmos	34	16	10	8	58	33	+25	42	
6	Qwa Qwa Stars	34	15	10	9	36	28	+8	40	
7	Umtata Bucks	34	14	9	11	41	42	−1	37	
8	Hellenic	34	13	10	11	42	38	+4	36	
9	Wits University	34	14	8	12	50	55	−5	36	
10	Giant Blackpool	34	12	9	13	42	45	−3	33	
11	Witbank Aces	34	11	7	16	42	57	−15	29	
12	Dynamos	34	9	10	15	43	49	−6	28	
13	Vaal Reefs Stars	34	8	10	16	38	51	−13	26	
14	AmaZulu	34	9	8	17	27	46	−19	26	
15	Bloemfontein Celtic	34	7	11	16	31	39	−8	25	
16	Pretoria City	34	8	6	20	37	57	−20	22	
17	Pilkington United Brothers ("PUBs") (R)	34	7	6	21	31	55	−24	20	Relegation to NSL Second Division
18	Durban Bush Bucks (R)	34	4	3	27	33	77	−44	11	Relegation to NSL Second Division

(C) Champions; (R) Relegated
