= 1992 Bob Save Superbowl =

South African football tournament season

1992 Bob Save Super Bowl
Tournament details
- Country: South Africa

Final positions
- Champions: Kaizer Chiefs
- Runners-up: Jomo Cosmos

The 1992 Bob Save Superbowl was the 1992 season of the South African club soccer knockout tournament, then known as the Bob Save Superbowl for sponsorship reasons.

It was won by Kaizer Chiefs, managed by Jeff Butler, and who earned the treble after winning the BP Top 8 and 1992 NSL First Division.

Jomo Cosmos, winners in 1990, qualified for the final for the third consecutive year.

== Results ==
=== Final ===
5 December 1992

Kaizer Chiefs	2–1	Jomo Cosmos

Vodacom Park Stadium, Bloemfontein
