= 1990 Federation Professional League season =

Federation Professional League
- Season: 1990
- Champions: Lightbody's Santos

The 1990 edition of the Federation Professional League was the final competition to take place. Five teams from the FPL joined the National Soccer League structure following the competition.

| Pos | Team | Pld | W | D | L | GF | GA | GD | Pts |
|---|---|---|---|---|---|---|---|---|---|
| 1 | Lightbody Santos (Cape Town) | 26 | 19 | 6 | 1 | 78 | 24 | +54 | 44 |
| 2 | Battswood F.C. (Cape Town) | 26 | 17 | 3 | 6 | 49 | 22 | +27 | 37 |
| 3 | PE Blackpool | 26 | 12 | 8 | 6 | 35 | 25 | +10 | 32 |
| 4 | Hotspur F.C.(Port Elizabeth) | 26 | 12 | 7 | 7 | 37 | 30 | +7 | 31 |
| 5 | Crusaders United (Stanger) | 26 | 13 | 5 | 8 | 34 | 30 | +4 | 31 |
| 6 | Bosmont Chelsea | 26 | 12 | 4 | 10 | 36 | 32 | +4 | 28 |
| 7 | Maritzburg United F.C. (Pietermaritzburg) | 26 | 10 | 6 | 10 | 41 | 33 | +8 | 26 |
| 8 | Birds F.C. (Pretoria) | 24 | 9 | 7 | 8 | 43 | 45 | −2 | 25 |
| 9 | Manning Rangers F.C. (Durban) | 24 | 7 | 8 | 9 | 39 | 39 | 0 | 22 |
| 10 | Bluebells United | 25 | 6 | 10 | 9 | 26 | 31 | −5 | 22 |
| 11 | Berea F.C. (Durban) | 26 | 4 | 10 | 12 | 28 | 55 | −27 | 18 |
| 12 | Manchester United (Estcourt) | 25 | 2 | 11 | 12 | 16 | 31 | −15 | 15 |
| 13 | Manchester City (Actonville) | 26 | 5 | 4 | 17 | 30 | 66 | −36 | 14 |
| 14 | Real Taj (Pietermaritzburg) | 26 | 3 | 7 | 16 | 31 | 60 | −29 | 13 |

Source: https://www.rsssf.org/tablesz/zaf90.html

The teams highlighted in green moved to the National Soccer League structure for the 1991 season alongside three clubs from the NSL's feeder; the OK League:

- African Wanderers
- Dangerous Darkies
- Highlands Park F.C.
