= List of Perth Glory FC head coaches =

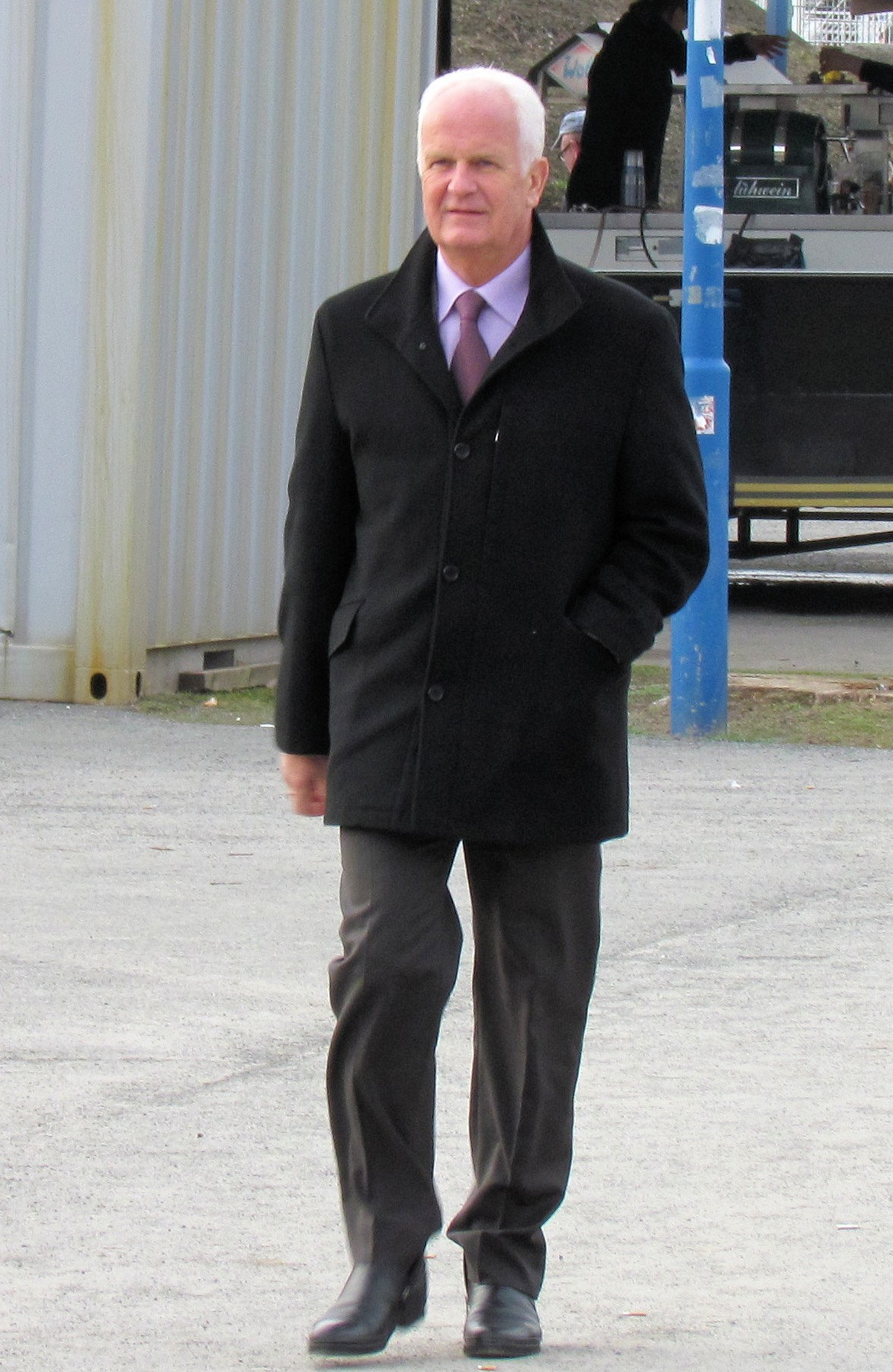
Bernd Stange was Perth's first manager to win a major piece of silverware, the 1999–2000 premiership

Perth Glory Football Club is an Australian professional soccer club based in Perth, Western Australia. The club played its first competitive match in October 1996, in the first round of the 1996–97 National Soccer League. They have played at their current home ground, Perth Oval, since their foundation in 1995. Perth is one of the three A-League clubs to survive the demise of the National Soccer League, the previous top division in Australian soccer. The club was implemented into the inaugural A-League season in 2005, and has since participated in every A-League Men season.

Since the inception of the club in 1995, Perth have had 16 different managers (including two caretaker managers). The current manager is Adam Griffiths, who took over from David Zdrilic on 28 October 2025. Glory's most successful manager is Mich d'Avray, who won two premierships and two championships during his three-season tenure.

== Managers ==
- Manager dates and nationalities are sourced from WorldFootball.net. Statistics are sourced from OzFootball and A-League Stats. Names of caretaker managers are supplied where known, and periods of caretaker management are highlighted in italics and marked caretaker or caretaker, then permanent appointment, depending on the scenario. Win percentage is rounded to two decimal places.
- Only first-team competitive matches are counted. Wins, losses and draws are results at the final whistle; the results of penalty shoot-outs are not counted.
- Statistics are complete up to and including the match played on 28 June 2024.

Key

- M = matches played; W = matches won; D = matches drawn; L = matches lost; GF = Goals for; GA = Goals against; Win % = percentage of total matches won
- † Managers with this background and symbol in the "Name" column are italicised to denote caretaker appointments.
- ‡ Managers with this background and symbol in the "Name" column are italicised to denote caretaker appointments promoted to full-time manager.

List of Perth Glory FC managers
Image	Name	Nationality	From	To	M	W	D	L	GF	GA	Win %	Honours	Notes
	Gary Marocchi	Australia	1 July 1996	30 June 1998	52	21	11	20	83	81	40.38		
	Bernd Stange	Germany	1 July 1998	30 June 2001	99	54	23	22	200	121	54.55	1 National Soccer League premiership	
	Mich d'Avray	England	1 July 2001	30 June 2004	89	61	12	16	195	84	68.54	2 National Soccer League premierships 2 National Soccer League championships	
	Steve McMahon	England	25 January 2005	7 December 2005	21	8	5	8	29	20	38.10		
	Alan Vest †	New Zealand	8 December 2005	25 July 2006	6	2	1	3	11	8	33.33		
	Ron Smith	Australia	26 July 2006	4 November 2007	43	9	14	20	44	44	20.93		
	Dave Mitchell	Australia	4 December 2007	12 October 2010	71	24	16	31	102	91	33.80		
	Ian Ferguson	Scotland	12 October 2010	13 January 2013	72	23	14	35	82	87	31.94		
	Alistair Edwards	Australia	11 February 2013	17 December 2013	18	7	4	7	22	20	38.89		
	Kenny Lowe ‡	England	20 December 2013	20 April 2018	141	61	27	53	226	185	43.26		
	Tony Popovic	Australia	11 May 2018	26 August 2020	60	30	13	17	104	57	50.00	1 A-League Men premiership	
	Richard Garcia	Australia	18 September 2020	20 March 2022	48	12	12	24	63	60	25.00		
	Ruben Zadkovich ‡	Australia	20 March 2022	2 June 2023	37	8	10	19	44	56	21.62		
	Kenny Lowe †	England	12 July 2023	3 August 2023	1	0	0	1	0	4	0.00		
	Alen Stajcic	Australia	3 August 2023	25 June 2024	27	5	7	15	46	69	18.52		
	David Zdrilic	Australia	28 June 2024	28 October 2025	32	6	6	20	42	80	18.75		
