= 1987 NSL First Division =

NSL First Division
- Season: 1987
- Champions: Jomo Cosmos
- Relegated: Durban City; African Wanderers; Giant Blackpool
- Matches played: 306
- Goals scored: 761 (2.49 per match)
- Longest winning run: 8
- Longest unbeaten run: 83
- Longest winless run: 7
- Longest losing run: 8

The 1987 National Soccer League First Division was the third edition of the NSL First Division in South Africa. It was won by Jomo Cosmos, who earned their first league title.

The other professional league, the Federation Professional League, continued to function independently.

== Table ==
Pos	Team	Pld	W	D	L	GF	GA	GD	Pts	Relegation
1	Jomo Cosmos (C)	34	16	14	4	46	30	+16	46	
2	Kaizer Chiefs	34	17	11	6	57	37	+20	45	
3	Mamelodi Sundowns	34	16	11	7	45	38	+7	43	
4	Arcadia	34	15	12	7	49	35	+14	42	
5	AmaZulu	34	14	10	10	47	40	+7	38	
6	Hellenic	34	14	9	11	55	44	+11	37	
7	Durban Bush Bucks	34	13	10	11	44	38	+6	36	
8	Bloemfontein Celtic	34	11	13	10	44	38	+6	35	
9	Wits University	34	12	11	11	42	41	+1	35	
10	Moroka Swallows	34	10	12	12	43	47	−4	32	
11	Orlando Pirates	34	11	10	13	40	45	−5	32	
12	Rangers	34	10	11	13	61	52	+9	31	
13	Fairways Stars	34	10	11	13	40	50	−10	31	
14	Witbank Aces	34	8	13	13	25	30	−5	29	
15	Leeds United	34	10	8	16	48	53	−5	28	
16	Durban City (Note: Rebranded as Natal United F.C. after the season.)	34	7	13	14	31	54	−23	27	
17	African Wanderers (R)	34	7	13	14	45	69	−24	27	Relegation to NSL Second Division
18	Giant Blackpool (R)	34	5	8	21	35	56	−21	18	Relegation to NSL Second Division

(C) Champions; (R) Relegated
