= Roger Links =

South African soccer player

Personal information
- Date of birth: 4 October 1963 (age 63)
- Place of birth: South Africa
- Position: Defender

Senior career*
Years	Team	Apps	(Gls)
1984–1990	Battswood FC		
1990–1993	Cape Town Spurs		

International career
1992–1993	South Africa	12	(0)
- * Club domestic league appearances and goals

Roger Links (born 4 October 1963) is a South African former soccer player who played as a defender for Battswood FC and Cape Town Spurs.
