= Mpumalanga Black Aces F.C. =

South African association football club

Black Aces
- Full name: Black Aces Football Club
- Nickname(s): Amazayoni
- Founded: 1937
- Dissolved: 2016
- Stadium: Lynnville stadium (SOE)
- League: Nkangala Men's Regional League
Home colours	Away colours

Black Aces was a South African football club that played in the Premier Soccer League. Aces usually played their home games in the Mpumalanga province but were based and trained in Johannesburg.

== History ==
The original club was founded in 1937 by dairy workers. The club folded after finishing 14th in the National First Division inland stream in 2002. The club had also been known as the Ukhumba Black Aces, Witbank Black Aces and Super Kurl Aces during its existence.

The club was in its second incarnation, and they entered the South African football league in 2007 when the Polokwane-based City Pillars league license was bought and the team was transferred to Witbank from Limpopo. The license was acquired in December 2006, and the team played under the name of Mpumalanga Black Aces in time for the 2007–08 season.

In 2004, two South African businessmen George Morfou and his brother Mario bought the club side Dangerous Darkies, a Vodacom League but the team failed to win promotion to the Mvela Golden League. The Vodacom League team was renamed Aces Academy in 2007 following the brothers' acquisition and in 2011, it was renamed AmaZayoni FC.

On 30 July 2014, it was announced that Aces had signed a new sponsorship deal with ISPS.

In 2016, John Comitis purchased the franchise rights, closing the club and creating Cape Town City F.C.

== Honours ==
- Bob Save Super Bowl
  - Winners (1): 1993
- BP Top Eight Cup
  - Winners (1): 1980
- PSL promotion/relegation play-off
  - Winners (2): 2008–09, 2012–13

== Club records ==
- Most starts: Percy Nxumalo 286
- Most goals: Percy Nxumalo 64
- Most starts in a season: Joseph Sibiya 41 (1992)
- Most goals in a season: Johannes Shili 19 (1992)
- Record Victory: 6–0 vs Royal Tigers (20/9/94, League)
- Record Defeat: 1–7 vs Hellenic (28/5/97, League)

== League record ==
=== National Soccer League ===
- 1985 – 10th
- 1986 – 11th
- 1987 – 14th
- 1988 – 8th
- 1989 – 14th
- 1990 – 11th
- 1991 – 15th
- 1992 – 7th
- 1993 – 14th
- 1994 – 11th
- 1995 – 14th

=== Premiership ===
- 1996–97 – 18th (relegated)

=== National First Division ===
- 1997–98 – 2nd (Inland Stream)
- 1998–99 – 10th (Inland Stream)
- 1999–00 – 12th (Inland Stream)
- 2000–01 – 13th (Inland Stream)
- 2001–02 – 14th (Inland Stream, folded)
- 2007–08 – 5th (Inland Stream, purchased licence from City Pillars)
- 2008–09 – 2nd (Inland Stream, promoted)

=== Premiership ===
- 2009–10 – 15th
- 2010–11 – 16th (relegated)

=== National First Division ===
- 2011–12 – 13th
- 2012–13 – 3rd (promoted)

=== Premiership ===
- 2013–14 – 7th
- 2014–15 – 10th
- 2015–16 – 4th (sold licence to Cape Town City)

== Managers ==
- (South Africa) Johnny Ferreira (1993–95)
- (South Africa) Steve Haupt (1997–99)
- (Northern Ireland) Sammy Troughton (20 November 2008 – 10 November 2009)
- (Cyprus) Aiki Agiomamitis (11 November 2009 – 21 September 2010)
- (South Africa) Neil Tovey (30 September 2010 – 23 December 2010)
- (France) Paul Dolezar (December, 2010 – February, 2011)
- (England) Mark Harrison (23 February 2011 – 27 June 2011)
- (South Africa) Craig Rosslee (July, 2011 – November, 2012)
- (Argentina) Rodolfo Zapata (November 2012 – May, 2012)
- (Zambia) Jacob Sakala (1 June 2012 – 30 June 2013)
- (South Africa) Clive Barker (4 March 2013 – 2015)
- (Zambia) Jacob Sakala (March, 2014 – 31 May 2015)
- (Turkey) Muhsin Ertuğrul (June, 2015 – 2016)
