= 1995 NSL First Division =

NSL First Division
- Season: 1995
- Champions: Cape Town Spurs
- Relegated: African Wanderers; Rabali Blackpool

The 1995 NSL First Division was the 11th edition of the National Soccer League First Division. The competition was won by Cape Town Spurs, coached by Mich d'Avray, who won the double by also winning the 1995 Bob Save Superbowl.

Pos	Team	Pld	W	D	L	GF	GA	GD	Pts	Relegation
1	Cape Town Spurs (Note: Following the completion of the season, Cape Town Spurs' licence was bought and the club were merged in to newly created Ajax Cape Town.) (C)	34	21	8	5	52	20	+32	71	
2	Mamelodi Sundowns	34	19	9	6	44	22	+22	66	
3	Orlando Pirates	34	16	12	6	42	22	+20	60	
4	Kaizer Chiefs	34	16	11	7	43	22	+21	59	
5	Hellenic F.C.	34	16	8	10	51	39	+12	56	
6	Bush Bucks	34	14	8	12	42	40	+2	50	
7	Vaal Professionals	34	12	12	10	41	37	+4	48	
8	Qwa Qwa Stars	34	12	12	10	39	39	0	48	
9	Real Rovers	34	11	10	13	46	52	−6	43	
10	Jomo Cosmos	34	10	12	12	33	37	−4	42	
11	Wits University	34	11	8	15	37	43	−6	41	
12	Manning Rangers	34	10	11	13	30	43	−13	41	
13	Bloemfontein Celtic	34	10	9	15	35	37	−2	39	
14	Witbank Aces	34	10	6	18	38	52	−14	36	
15	Moroka Swallows	34	7	13	14	35	47	−12	34	
16	AmaZulu	34	7	13	14	35	52	−17	34	
17	African Wanderers (R)	34	7	12	15	38	54	−16	33	Relegation to National First Division
18	Rabali Blackpool (R)	36	5	10	21	34	56	−22	25	Relegation to National First Division

(C) Champions; (R) Relegated
