= 1989 NSL First Division =

NSL First Division
- Season: 1989
- Champions: Kaizer Chiefs (1st NSL title) (6th South African title)
- Relegated: Leeds United; Cape Town Spurs
- Matches played: 306
- Goals scored: 749 (2.45 per match)

The 1989 National Soccer League First Division was the fifth edition of the National Soccer League First Division in South Africa. It was won by Kaizer Chiefs.

The other professional league, the Federation Professional League, continued to function independently.

== Table ==
Pos	Team	Pld	W	D	L	GF	GA	GD	Pts	Relegation
1	Kaizer Chiefs (C)	34	21	9	4	50	23	+27	51	
2	Orlando Pirates	34	22	6	6	61	31	+30	50	
3	Hellenic	34	20	7	7	64	28	+36	47	
4	Jomo Cosmos	34	19	4	11	66	36	+30	42	
5	Mamelodi Sundowns	34	15	12	7	48	28	+20	42	
6	Giant Blackpool	34	16	9	9	50	39	+11	41	
7	Wits University	34	12	12	10	43	36	+7	36	
8	Arcadia	34	9	18	7	42	35	+7	36	
9	Moroka Swallows	34	12	8	14	39	45	−6	32	
10	Fairways Stars	34	12	8	14	37	47	−10	32	
11	Amazulu	34	11	10	13	36	46	−10	32	
12	Bloemfontein Celtic	34	7	15	12	32	41	−9	29	
13	Vaal Reef Stars	34	7	14	13	42	52	−10	28	
14	Witbank Aces	34	7	12	15	30	39	−9	26	
15	Rangers	34	5	14	15	30	48	−18	24	
16	Durban Bush Bucks	34	6	11	17	30	53	−23	23	
17	Leeds United (R)	34	6	9	19	24	61	−37	21	Relegation to NSL Second Division
18	Cape Town Spurs (R)	34	4	10	20	25	56	−31	18	Relegation to NSL Second Division

(C) Champions; (R) Relegated
