= George Dearnaley =

South African soccer player

Personal information
- Date of birth: 23 February 1969 (age 57)
- Place of birth: Cape Town, South Africa
- Position: Striker

Youth career
- Hellenic FC
- 1986–1989: AmaZulu F.C.

Senior career*
Years	Team	Apps	(Gls)
1990–1994	AmaZulu	81	(38)
1997	Hellenic		
1997–1999	Seven Stars	15	(12)
Total		124	(61)

International career
1992–1993	South Africa	3	(0)
- * Club domestic league appearances and goals

George Dearnaley (born 23 February 1969) is a South African former soccer player who played as a striker for Hellenic FC, Seven Stars and most notably AmaZulu.

== International career ==
He represented Bafana Bafana in the 1994 World Cup qualifiers. He made his international debut in a Group D World Cup qualifying where South Africa beat Congo 1–0 on 24 October 1992. He played his last international match in a Group D World Cup qualifying where South Africa beat Congo 1–0 on 31 January 1993. George's nickname was "3 Caps".

== Early life ==
Dearnaley is of English descent. His ancestors were probably from Dearnley in Lancashire. Dearnaley attended the New Forest Boys High School in Durban. Growing up in Montclair he had very easy access to NSL matches and venues in the townships. He would watch matches mainly from the Glebe Stadium in Umlazi where he encountered the likes of Mlungisi Ngubane and Jomo Sono on numerous occasions. George took inspiration to be a footballer from his Uncle, Addy Dearnaley, who played as a striker for local amateur teams in Stalybridge.

== Amazulu ==
He got permission from Bizzah Dlamini to train with Usuthu in 1986 when Dearnaley was still in school. He left South Africa for a soccer scholarship in America after he saw minimal chances of playing professionally there, he returned after his father had a conversion with Clive Barker two weeks later. He attended first team pre season training with Amazulu in 1990 when he attended the Natal Technikon. He scored the second goal on debut in January 1990 against Fairway Stars at Kings Park Stadium in Durban winning 3–0. He went on to be the 1992 NSL Golden Boot winner with 20 league goals. He was nicknamed "Sgebengu" by Amazulu fans which means "criminal" in Zulu.

== Professional experience after retirement ==
- 1997 – Associate Publisher at Touchline Media
- 1997–2007 – Associate Publisher at Kick Off Magazine
- 2006–2010 – Football consultant and columnist at 24.com
- 2008–2010 – Soccer Business Manager at Media24

== Old Mutual FC ==
Dearnaley bought his own SAFA Second Division franchise, Old Mutual FC where he works with Gerald Stober and Mark Anderson as the goalkeeper coach.
