= 1987 Federation Professional League season =

Federation Professional League
- Season: 1986–87
- Champions: Lightbody's Santos

The 1987 Federation Professional League season started on 4 April and ended on 25 November 1987. It was won by Lightbody's Santos.

Pos	Team	Pld	W	D	L	GF	GA	GD	Pts
1	Lightbody's Santos	18	10	8	0	42	17	+25	28
2	Jakes Autolot United	18	11	6	1	34	18	+16	28
3	Mio Swaraj	18	8	7	3	32	19	+13	23
4	Bosmont Chelsea	18	7	6	5	32	21	+11	20
5	Manning Rangers	18	9	1	8	27	33	−6	19
6	Real Taj	18	6	6	6	29	29	0	18
7	Birds	18	5	5	8	34	35	−1	15
8	Berea	18	2	8	8	19	33	−14	12
9	Tongaat Crusaders	18	3	5	10	18	42	−24	11
10	Bluebells	18	1	4	13	14	34	−20	6
