= Sam Magalefa =

South African soccer player

Personal information
- Full name: Sammy Job Magalefa
- Date of birth: 26 April 1978 (age 48)
- Place of birth: Soweto, South Africa
- Position: Midfielder

Senior career*
| Years | Team | Apps | (Gls) |
| 1998–2000 | Wits University | | |
| 2000–2001 | Supersport United | | |
| 2001–2003 | Jomo Cosmos | | |
| 2003–2004 | Aris | 4 | (0) |
| 2004–2008 | Jomo Cosmos | | |

International career
| 2002 | South Africa | 2 | (1) |
- * Club domestic league appearances and goals

Sammy Job Magalefa (born 26 April 1978) is a South African former soccer player who played professionally as a midfielder in Greece and South Africa. He earned two caps and scored one goal for the South African national team, and was named to the squad for the 2002 COSAFA Cup.

== Career ==
Born in Soweto, Magalefa played for ten seasons in the Premier Soccer League, with Wits University, Supersport United and Jomo Cosmos.

In January 2004, he began a six-month stint in Greece, but he made just four league appearances for Aris before returning to South Africa.

In December 2007, Magalefa suffered a knee injury and didn't make another appearance for Jomo Cosmos for the remainder of the season. The club were relegated and his contract was cancelled in August 2008.
