= Mngadi =

Mngadi is a surname. Notable people with the surname include:

- Phakamani Mngadi (born 1994), South African footballer
- Pinky Mngadi (fl. from 2024), South African politician
