= SASF =

SASF may refer to:

- SASF Cup, South African Soccer Federation Cup, 1961 to 1985
- South African Special Forces
- Southampton Animal Shelter Foundation
- Southern Africa Social Forum, former conference
- South Australian Soccer Federation, former governing body of football in South Australia
- Spanish Air and Space Force
