= Bonginkosi Gumede =

South African soccer player

Personal information
- Date of birth: 19 July 1998 (age 28)
- Place of birth: Soweto, South Africa
- Height: 1.80 m (5 ft 11 in)
- Position: Midfielder

Team information
- Current team: Jomo Cosmos
- Number: 4

Senior career*
Years	Team	Apps	(Gls)
2019–	Jomo Cosmos	83	(0)
- * Club domestic league appearances and goals as of 14:30, 22 August 2020 (UTC)

Bonginkosi Gumede (born 19 July 1998) is a South African professional soccer player who plays as a midfielder for Jomo Cosmos.

== Career ==
Born in Soweto, Gumede joined National First Division team Jomo Cosmos in July 2019. He made his debut for Cosmos on 18 August 2019, coming on as a substitute for midfielder Tumi Ngwepe in the 73rd minute against TS Galaxy. The match ended in a 0–0 draw.

== Career statistics ==
As of end of 2019–20 season

Club	Season	League			National Cup		League Cup		Other		Total	
Club	Season	Division	Apps	Goals	Apps	Goals	Apps	Goals	Apps	Goals	Apps	Goals
Jomo Cosmos	2019–20	National First Division	10	0	0	0	0	0	0	0	10	0
Total			10	0	0	0	0	0	0	0	10	0
