= 1989 Federation Professional League season =

Federation Professional League
- Season: 1989–90
- Champions: Battswood
- Top goalscorer: Duncan Crowie (Lightbodys Santos) 19 goals

The 1989 Federation Professional League season was won by Battswood, who joined the league, winning the treble, in their first season after turning professional.

| Pos | Team | Pld | W | D | L | GF | GA | GD | Pts |
|---|---|---|---|---|---|---|---|---|---|
| 1 | Battswood (Cape Town) | 22 | 13 | 5 | 4 | 39 | 15 | +24 | 31 |
| 2 | Bosmont Chelsea | 22 | 13 | 5 | 4 | 41 | 27 | +14 | 31 |
| 3 | Lightbodys Santos (Cape Town) | 22 | 12 | 6 | 4 | 45 | 22 | +23 | 30 |
| 4 | Bluebells United | 21 | 10 | 4 | 7 | 25 | 16 | +9 | 24 |
| 5 | Real Taj (Pietermaritzburg) | 22 | 9 | 4 | 9 | 33 | 22 | +11 | 22 |
| 6 | Crusaders United (Stanger) | 21 | 8 | 3 | 10 | 25 | 25 | 0 | 19 |
| 7 | Manchester United (Estcourt) | 22 | 8 | 3 | 11 | 30 | 46 | −16 | 19 |
| 8 | Manning Rangers F.C. (Durban) | 18 | 8 | 2 | 8 | 25 | 26 | −1 | 18 |
| 9 | Pretoria Jasair Birds (Pretoria) | 22 | 6 | 4 | 12 | 36 | 43 | −7 | 16 |
| 10 | Maritzburg United F.C. (Pietermaritzburg) | 21 | 6 | 4 | 11 | 19 | 31 | −12 | 16 |
| 11 | Manchester City (Benoni) | 21 | 6 | 3 | 12 | 24 | 37 | −13 | 15 |
| 12 | Berea Durban (Durban) | 21 | 6 | 3 | 12 | 26 | 46 | −20 | 15 |

Updated to match(es) played on unknown. Source: http://www.todor66.com/football/Africa/South_Africa/1989_FPL.html
