= Giant Blackpool =

- Dissolved: 1991
- Ground: Mohlakeng, Gauteng

Giant Blackpool (often abbreviated as Blackpool) were a South African football club. The club were based in Mohlakeng, a township near Randfontein in Gauteng.

Former players include Fani Madida, John "Shoes" Moshoeu and Geelbooi Masango who together formed what was known as "the Triple-M combination". Moshoeu began his professional career with the club in 1987. Former Orlando Pirates defender Gavin Lane was also once a player at the club.

At one time, the former South African national women's football team Sandile Bali was a head coach of the club, as was former Manchester United player Eddie Lewis.

The club was owned by NSL executive chairman Coloured Passmore.

The club were first promoted to the top tier of South African football in 1986 alongside Leeds United. Their adventures in top flight would come to an end after just the one season as they were relegated.

They were promoted in their first season in the OK League.

Another club, Port Elizabeth Blackpool opted into the National Soccer League structure following their 1990 FPL campaign, they were relegated from the NSL in 1991.

In the 1991 edition of the JPS Knockout Cup, both Blackpool clubs were beaten by Dynamos F.C., Dynamos met PE Blackpool in the first round and Giant Blackpool in the final. John "Shoes" Moshoeu, Samuel Sikhakane and Jerry Sikhosana all scored over the duration of the two legged final which took place in August but it was not enough and Dynamos won on aggregate.

A week after Knock out Cup final, it was announced that the club had bought the rights to the Highlands Park name and merged with the newly formed phoenix club, Highlands Park were a successful club during the 1960s–80s era. It was hoped that the new name would bring in more white-skinned fans, as it had done in the past. The club soon changed its name from Giant Blackpool to Highlands Park. However, after a season, the franchise was sold, relocated to Welkom, renamed to Welkom Eagles and relegated in 1993.

In 1995, South African businessman Peter Rabali purchased a franchise licence for a club and renamed it to Rabali Blackpool. It is not considered to be the same club.

== Honours ==
- JSP Knockout Cup Runner-up: 1991

== League history ==
Year	League	Position	Club Name	Played	Won	Draws	Losses	Goals for	Goals against	Points	Notes
1987	NSL	18	Giant Blackpool	34	5	8	21	35	56	18	Relegated
1988	OK League (Promoted)										
1989	NSL	6	Giant Blackpool	34	16	9	9	50	39	41	
1990	NSL	10	Giant Blackpool	34	13	9	12	50	55	36	
