= Shane McGregor =

South African soccer player (born 1963)

Personal information
- Full name: Roy Shane McGregor
- Date of birth: 5 December 1963 (age 62)
- Place of birth: Johannesburg, South Africa
- Position: Striker

Youth career
- Robertsham Callies
- Air Force Team

Senior career*
Years	Team	Apps	(Gls)
1984–1987	Grinaker Rangers	73	(54)
1987–1994	Kaizer Chiefs	114	(64)
1994–1995	Pretoria City	34	(12)
1994–1997	Supersport United	102	(39)
Total		328	(169)

International career^{‡}
1992	South Africa	1	(0)
- * Club domestic league appearances and goals ‡ National team caps and goals as of 30 May 2012

Shane McGregor (born 5 December 1963) is a retired South African football player who played professionally for Grinaker Rangers, Kaizer Chiefs, Pretoria City F.C. and Supersport United. He scored over 20 goals four times in a season in 1986, 1987, 1991 and 1992.

== Grinaker Rangers ==
"Makentane" (Chains) turned professional at age 21 where he bought his first car, Ford Escort 1600 earning R250 a month. He helped the "Black and Whites" win the 1986 1986 National Soccer League by scoring 27 goals in 39 matches.

== Kaizer Chiefs ==
=== 1988 season ===
He was the NSL top goalscorer with 19 goals. He was voted 1989 Footballer of the Year and Players' Player of the Season.

=== 1990/1991 season ===
He scored 25 goals in 38 matches when they won the treble.

=== 1992 season ===
Fani Madida and Shane McGregor were both signed in 1987 and made their presence felt in 1992 where their deadly combination produced 54 goals. Madida with a record of 34 strikes in 42 and McGregor with 20 when they won the double.

== International career ==
At the age of 29 in an African Cup of Nations qualifier against Zimbabwe, McGregor played his one and only international match due to an argument with coach Stanley Tshabalala about his demands, and style of play, which led to a fallout with his international career.

== Pretoria City ==
Pretoria City (now Supersport United) was McGregor's last club where he retired at the age of 34.

== Style of play ==
Kickoff website described MacGregor as a player that did "good work off the ball, he could get into the area, find space and do damage".

== After retirement ==
=== Coaching career ===
He was made general manager at Supersport United after being a player-coach. He has worked as assistant coach at Mamelodi Sundowns, he was also caretaker coach for seven matches after the departure of Ted Dumitru. He lost the BP Top 8 final and was heavily criticised. He was fired by Anastasia Tsichlas who owned the club before Patrice Motsepe.

=== Television ===
Supersport United, which is owned by a group of television channels (Supersport), gave McGregor a job at TellyTrack giving betting tips in different sport codes.

== Honours ==
- NSL: 1989, 1991, 1992
- BP Top 8: 1987, 1989, 1991, 1992, 1994
- JPS Knockout Cup: 1988, 1989
- Mainstay Cup: 1987, 1992
- Iwisa Spectacular: 1986, 1987, 1988, 1989, 1990
- Ohlsson's Challenge: 1987, 1989
- Castle Challenge: 1990, 1991
- Panasonic Cup: 1986
