= Jimmy Joubert =

South African soccer player

Personal information
- Date of birth: 21 October 1952
- Place of birth: Gauteng, South Africa
- Height: 1.95 m (6 ft 5 in)
- Positions: Striker; defender

Youth career
- 1965–1969: Southern Suburbs

Senior career*
Years	Team	Apps	(Gls)
1970–1977	Swaraj United	168	(84)
1977–1981	Highlands Park	136	(76)
1981–1984	Kaizer Chiefs	102	(15)
Total		406	(175)
- * Club domestic league appearances and goals

Jimmy "Brixton Towers" Joubert (21 October 1952) was a South African soccer player who played in the FPL, NPSL and NSL as a defender and then a striker later in his career.

== Swaraj ==
Joubert was signed from Southern Suburbs in the 1970s. He helped Swaraj United win the FPL in 1977 winning the Golden Boot with 23 goals.

== Highlands Park ==
At Dion Highlands Park Joubert and his team won the NPSL in 1980, beating Kaizer Chiefs by five points.

== Kaizer Chiefs ==
In 1981, he joined the Chiefs under experienced coach Joe Frickleton, and they won the quadruple.

== Personal life ==
His son, Mark Joubert played for Hellenic.
