= SASF Cup =

- Founded: 1961
- Abolished: 1990
- Most championships: Lightbody Santos

The SASF Cup was an association football competition that took place in South Africa between 1961 and 1990. The participants were affiliated to the South African Soccer Federation and Federation Professional League.

| Year | Winner | Runner-up |
SASL Cup
| 1961 | Cape Ramblers | Transvaal United |
| 1962 | Avalon Athletic | |
| 1963 | Avalon Athletic | |
Mainstay Cup
| 1969 | Aces United | |
| 1970 | Verulam Suburbs | |
| 1971 | Maritzburg City | |
| 1972 | Glenville | |
| 1973 | Verulam Suburbs | |
Cola Cola Shield
| 1974 | Berea | Cape Town Spurs F.C. |
| 1975 | Cape Town Spurs F.C. | Bluebells |
| 1976 | Berea F.C. | Sundowns |
| 1977 | Manning Rangers | PG Bluebells |
| 1978 | Durban City | Suburbs United |
Seven Seas Cup
| 1979 | Glenville | |
| 1980 | Cape Town Spurs F.C. | |
| 1981 | Vereeniging Old Boys | |
| 1982 | Bosmont Chelsea | |
| 1983 | Maritzburg United | |
| 1984 | Tongaat Crusaders United | |
| 1985 | Lightbody's Santos | |
Golden City Homes Cup
| 1986 | Real Taj | |
| 1987 | Jakes Autolot United | |
| 1988 | Lightbody's Santos | |
| 1989 | Battswood F.C. | |
| 1990 | Lightbody's Santos | |
