= Luphumlo Sifumba =

South African soccer player

Personal information
- Full name: Lumphumlo Kaka Sifumba
- Date of birth: 12 July 2005 (age 21)
- Place of birth: Philippi, South Africa
- Position: Midfielder

Team information
- Current team: Durban City
- Number: 35

Youth career
- Flamingo FC
- Delft Spurs
- Cape Town City

Senior career*
Years	Team	Apps	(Gls)
2023–2025	Cape Town City	15	(0)
2023–	Durban City	4	(0)
- * Club domestic league appearances and goals as of 4 January 2026

Lumphumlo Kaka Sifumba (born 12 July 2005) is a South African soccer player currently playing as a midfielder for Durban City.

== Club career ==
=== Early career ===
Born in Philippi, Western Cape, Sifumba left local side Flamingo FC when still in primary school, travelling to Cape Town to play in the Youth City football academy. Due to issues with his registration, he was unable to sign an academy contract with any club, so he moved to Delft at the age of ten to play for Delft Spurs. He stayed at Delft Spurs for two years, before trialling with other sides.

=== Cape Town City ===
He went on trial with Cape Town City when he was fourteen, going on to sign with the club. He made history in May 2021, when he became the youngest player to feature in the Diski Rewired competition - the country's reserve league.

In January 2022, he represented Coastal United in the DStv Compact Cup, scoring a long-range goal against Dinaledi. In June of the same year, he became the first South African to sign with entertainment agency Roc Nation. In September of the same year, he was named by English newspaper The Guardian as one of the best players born in 2005 worldwide.

Sifumba made his professional debut for Cape Town City on 22 April 2023, coming on as a second-half substitute for Colombian Camilo Zapata in a 2–1 away loss to Orlando Pirates. He was singled out by manager Eric Tinkler as the only bright spark for Cape Town in the game, also saying that he should have brought him on as a substitute earlier.

== Career statistics ==
=== Club ===
As of 4 May 2023

Appearances and goals by club, season and competition
Club	Season	League			Cup		Other		Total	
Club	Season	Division	Apps	Goals	Apps	Goals	Apps	Goals	Apps	Goals
Cape Town City	2022–23	DStv Premiership	3	0	0	0	0	0	3	0
Career total			3	0	0	0	0	0	3	0
