= Mich d'Avray =

Footballer (born 1962)

Personal information
- Full name: Jean-Michel d'Avray
- Date of birth: 19 February 1962 (age 64)
- Place of birth: Johannesburg, South Africa
- Height: 6 ft 1 in (1.85 m)
- Position: Forward

Senior career*
Years	Team	Apps	(Gls)
1979–1990	Ipswich Town	211	(38)
1988	→ Leicester City (loan)	3	(0)
1991–1992	NEC Nijmegen	28	(2)
Total		242	(40)

International career
1984	England U21	2	(1)

Managerial career
- 1991–1992: Moroka Swallows
- 1992–1995: Cape Town Spurs
- 1993–1997: South Africa U23
- 2001–2006: Perth Glory
- 2008–2009: Bloemfontein Celtic
- * Club domestic league appearances and goals

Jean-Michel "Mich" d'Avray (born 19 February 1962) is a former football player and manager who most recently was technical director at Ajax Cape Town until 2018. A forward, he spent the majority of his playing career at Ipswich Town. Born in South Africa, he represented the England U21 national team at international level.

== Club career ==
D'Avray was born in Johannesburg, South Africa. His professional football career began when he made his debut for Ipswich Town against Southampton at Portman Road in November 1979. Over the next 11 seasons he made more than 200 appearances for the club, scoring nearly 40 goals. D'Avray contributed to Ipswich's victorious 1980–81 UEFA Cup campaign, making one appearance during the run. However he wasn't part of the squad for the final itself. He also had a brief spell on loan to Leicester City where he made three appearances during the 1986–87 season. He went on to play for Dutch club NEC Nijmegen 28 times between 1990 and 1992.

== International career ==
While playing for Ipswich, d'Avray won two caps for England at Under-21 level. He scored once, against Italy to help England into the final of the 1984 UEFA European Under-21 Football Championship.

== Managerial career ==
D'Avray started his managerial career in 1991 with the Moroka Swallows in Johannesburg where he remained for just one season before moving to the Cape Town Spurs. He was awarded the South African Coach of the Year award in 1993 before leading the Spurs to a league and cup double in the 1994–95 season. From 1993 to 1997 he coached the South Africa U23 national team, leading them out in 1994 for their inaugural game against Ghana. He coached the squad for a total of 28 games, his final match coming in December 1997 against Uganda.

In 1998, he moved to Australia to join A-League team Perth Glory as assistant manager before becoming manager in 2001. He led the team to the league title in 2003 and 2004. and succeeded Lawrie McKinna as National Soccer League (NSL) Coach of the Year, winning the accolade in the 2003–04 season, the final time the award was made.

D'Avray became technical director of the Glory in 2005 but held the position for just one season. He managed Perth Glory from 2001 to 2006.

He joined Bloemfontein Celtic at the start of the 2008–09 season. In January 2009 he was replaced as Coach by Owen da Gama after a poor run of performances that left Celtic close to relegation. D'Avray remained on the staff as a development coach.

== Personal life ==
D'Avray is married to his wife Angela and has two children. He holds a UEFA Pro Licence.

== Honours ==
=== Player ===
Ipswich Town

- UEFA Cup: 1981

=== Manager ===
Cape Town Spurs

- National Soccer League: 1995
- Bob Save Superbowl: 1995

Perth Glory

- National Soccer League: 2002-03, 2003-04
