= North End Stadium =

Stadium in Eastern Cape, South Africa

- Interactive map of North End Stadium
- Location: East London, Eastern Cape
- Coordinates: 33.005°S 27.895°E

North End Stadium is a multi-use stadium in East London, Eastern Cape, South Africa. It is currently used mostly for football matches and is the home ground of Bush Bucks and Birmingham City of South Africa.

In March 2019, Tornados F.C. owner Siphiwo "Mawawa" Nyobo was shot and killed outside the stadium.
