= 1996–97 South African Premiership =

Premiership
- Season: 1996–97
- Champions: Manning Rangers; Inaugural Premiership champions 1st South African title
- Relegated: Michau Warriors; Witbank Aces
- CAF Champions League: Manning Rangers
- African Cup Winners' Cup: Kaizer Chiefs (withdrew); Mamelodi Sundowns (replaced Kaizer Chiefs)
- Matches: 306
- Goals: 692 (2.26 per match)
- Top goalscorer: Wilfred Mugeyi; Umtata Bush Bucks (22 goals)
- Biggest home win: Kaizer Chiefs 7–2 Witbank Aces; Kaizer Chiefs 5-0 Real Rovers
- Biggest away win: Witbank Aces 1–7 Hellenic (28 May 1997)
- Highest scoring: Kaizer Chiefs 7–2 Witbank Aces (9 goals)

The 1996–97 South African Premiership, known as the 1996–97 Castle Premiership for sponsorship purposes, and also commonly referred to as the PSL after the governing body, was the first season of the newly established top-flight professional football league in South Africa. The league was an 18-team competition established in 1996 by Irvin Khoza, Kaizer Motaung, Raymond Hack and Jomo Sono in conjunction with the South African Football Association and it would run parallel to the European football calendar.

== Season summary ==
Manning Rangers comfortably finished top of the log to win the first Premiership title ahead of several more fancied opponents. Rangers, known as the Mighty Maulers, dominated to such an extent that they finished eight points clear of second-placed Kaizer Chiefs and a further two ahead of Orlando Pirates.

The Chiefs, known as the Amakhosi, had a more potent attack and a better defensive record than Rangers, and they lost fewer games, but their propensity to draw matches that they should have won cost them the trophy. It handed Gordon Igesund the first of four Premiership titles that he would win in the competition and got South Africa's new top-flight league off to a noteworthy start.

Umtata Bush Bucks and Hellenic completed the top five, with Mamelodi Sundowns in sixth, Jomo Cosmos in seventh and Cape Town Spurs in eighth.

Popular clubs Bloemfontein Celtic and Moroka Swallows came in 10th and 11th respectively, while KwaZulu-Natal giants AmaZulu finished 14th on the 18-team log.

The first two teams to be relegated to the second tier from the Premiership were Witbank Aces – who won just four games all season and finished with 19 points – and Michau Warriors. Real Rovers and Vaal Professionals (36 points each) finished a single point ahead of Warriors and avoided the demotion.

There was an abandoned game between Bloemfontein Celtic and Kaizer Chiefs on Sunday 16 February 1997. The game in Bloemfontein was called off in the 40th minute, with the home side trailing Chiefs 2-0, due to crowd trouble. Kaizer Chiefs were given the result along with 3 log points due to the trouble with the crowd being instigated by the Celtic fans. This was a rather surprising turn of events as the Celtic fans, while having a reputation for being extremely vocal and passionate, are not known to be unruly.

== Final league table ==
Pos	Team	Pld	W	D	L	GF	GA	GD	Pts	Qualification or relegation
1	Manning Rangers (C)	34	23	5	6	53	28	+25	74	1998 CAF Champions League First Round (Note: Due to the Premiership following a different football calendar to the rest of Africa, which runs over a single calendar year and not the international August–May calendar followed by the Premiership, Manning Rangers & Mamelodi Sundowns would only be eligible to enter the 1998 editions of the respective CAF competitions they qualified for.)
2	Kaizer Chiefs	34	18	12	4	56	23	+33	66	Withdrew from the 1998 African Cup Winners' Cup (Note: Kaizer Chiefs, who had qualified for the African Cup Winners' Cup, withdrew from the competition and were replaced by Mamelodi Sundowns.)
3	Orlando Pirates	34	18	10	6	43	27	+16	64	
4	Umtata Bush Bucks	34	16	9	9	45	29	+16	57	
5	Hellenic	34	15	8	11	46	31	+15	53	
6	Mamelodi Sundowns	34	13	11	10	35	30	+5	50	1998 African Cup Winners' Cup first round
7	Jomo Cosmos	34	11	16	7	32	27	+5	49	
8	Cape Town Spurs	34	14	6	14	40	45	−5	48	
9	SuperSport United	34	10	16	8	40	35	+5	46	
10	Bloemfontein Celtic	34	13	5	16	38	39	−1	44	
11	Moroka Swallows	34	11	10	13	33	35	−2	43	
12	Wits University	34	11	8	15	27	31	−4	41	
13	Qwa Qwa Stars	34	10	8	16	39	49	−10	38	
14	AmaZulu	34	9	10	15	34	46	−12	37	
15	Vaal Professionals	34	10	6	18	38	49	−11	36	
16	Real Rovers	34	8	12	14	35	46	−11	36	
17	Michau Warriors (R)	34	10	5	19	32	50	−18	35	Relegated to the National First Division
18	Witbank Aces (R)	34	4	7	23	26	72	−46	19	Relegated to the National First Division

Source: rsssf.com
(C) Champions; (R) Relegated

== See also ==
- Castle Lager
