= 2010 Telkom Charity Cup =

Tournament details
- Country: South Africa
- Teams: 4

Final positions
- Champions: Kaizer Chiefs

Tournament statistics
- Matches played: 3
- Goals scored: 4 (1.33 per match)
- Top goal scorer(s): 1 goal Isaac Chansa (Orlando Pirates)

The 2010 Telkom Charity Cup was a South African football (soccer) one-day tournament for Premier Soccer League clubs, which took place on 7 August. It was the 25th Charity Cup, and the 4th under the current name. The tournament was held at Soccer City for the first time since it was closed to be rebuilt, 3 years ago. The 4 clubs involved were chosen by a public vote. The participating teams were Kaizer Chiefs, Mamelodi Sundowns, Orlando Pirates and AmaZulu. The tournament was won by Kaizer Chiefs, on penalties, over Orlando Pirates.

== Vote totals ==
- Sundowns 191 384
- AmaZulu 124 372
- Orlando Pirates 113 989
- Kaizer Chiefs 113 086

== Fixtures ==
Semi-finals
7 August 2010 – Soccer City, Soweto
(South Africa) AmaZulu	0
(South Africa) Orlando Pirates	1
7 August 2010 – Soccer City, Soweto
(South Africa) Kaizer Chiefs	1
(South Africa) Mamelodi Sundowns	0

Final
7 August 2010 – Soccer City, Soweto
(South Africa) Orlando Pirates	1 (3)
(South Africa) Kaizer Chiefs	1 (4)

=== Semi-finals ===
Date	Time (UTC+2)	Team #1	Res.	Team #2
2010-08-07	10.00	AmaZulu	0-1	Orlando Pirates
2010-08-07	12.00	Kaizer Chiefs	1-0	Mamelodi Sundowns

=== Final ===
Date	Time (UTC+2)	Team #1	Res.	Team #2
2010-08-07	17.00	Orlando Pirates	1-1 (4-3 on pen)	Kaizer Chiefs
