= Mark Davies (South African soccer) =

South African soccer player

Personal information
- Place of birth: South Africa
- Position: Defender

Senior career*
Years	Team	Apps	(Gls)
-1991	Escombe FC		
1991-2002	Manning Rangers F.C.		
- * Club domestic league appearances and goals

Mark Davies (born in South Africa) is a South African retired footballer.

== Career ==
Davies was inspired to start playing football after watching South African Gary Bailey feature in the 1979 English FA Cup final.

After helping Manning Rangers, who he spent his entire professional career with, win their first league title in 1996/97, Davies helped the club go within three points of reaching the 1997/98 CAF Champions League final.
