= Port Elizabeth Blackpool F.C. =

Port Elizabeth Blackpool (often abbreviated as PE Blackpool) were a South African football club from Port Elizabeth, who played their last season in 1991.

The club originally played in the Federation Professional League before opting into the National Soccer League in 1990.

Pos	Pos	Team	Pld	W	D	L	GF	GA	Pts	Notes
1990 FPL	3	PE Blackpool	26	12	8	6	35	25	32	Opted into NSL.
1991 NSL	21	PE Blackpool	34	7	8	19	35	63	22	Relegated
