= 1995 Bob Save Superbowl =

South African football tournament season

1996 Bob Save Super Bowl
Tournament details
- Country: South Africa

Final positions
- Champions: Cape Town Spurs
- Runners-up: Pretoria City

The 1995 Bob Save Superbowl was the 1995 season of the South African club football (soccer) knockout tournament, then known as the Bob Save Superbowl for sponsorship reasons.

It was won by Cape Town Spurs, coached by Mich d'Avray, earning them the double after they had also won the league.

== Results ==
=== Semifinals ===
Pretoria City	1–0	QwaQwa Stars

Kaizer Chiefs	1–2	Cape Town Spurs

=== Final ===
Cape Town Spurs	3–2	Pretoria City
