= 1993 Bob Save Superbowl =

South African football tournament season

1993 Bob Save Super Bowl
Tournament details
- Country: South Africa

Final positions
- Champions: Witbank Black Aces
- Runners-up: Kaizer Chiefs

The 1993 Bob Save Superbowl was the 1993 season of the South African club football (soccer) knockout tournament, then known as the Bob Save Superbowl for sponsorship reasons.

It was won by Witbank Black Aces.

== Results ==
=== Final ===
Witbank Black Aces	1–0	Kaizer Chiefs
Peer 90+'

FNB Stadium, Johannesburg
