= Anthony Tokpah =

Footballer (born 1977

Personal information
- Full name: Anthony Tokpah
- Date of birth: July 26, 1977 (age 49)
- Place of birth: Liberia
- Height: 1.90 m (6 ft 3 in)
- Position: Goalkeeper

Senior career*
Years	Team	Apps	(Gls)
- Ratanang Maholosiane
–1994	Manning Rangers		
1995–2000	Hajduk Split	7	(0)
1996	→ HNK Trogir (loan)	6	(0)
2001–2002	Hershey Wildcats	17	(0)
2003–2006	Atlanta Silverbacks		
2006	Guayabo		

International career
1994–2001	Liberia	28	(0)
- * Club domestic league appearances and goals

Anthony Tokpah (born July 26, 1977) is a Liberian retired football goalkeeper. He was also a member of the Liberia national football team.

== Career ==
Anthony Tokpah, after playing with Ratanang Maholosiane and Manning Rangers in South Africa, came to Croatian First League club HNK Hajduk Split in 1995, along with another Liberian international, Mass Sarr, Jr. Beside the first season when he played 7 league matches, he did not get much chances to play while with Hajduk. In 2000, he moved to the United States where he played with Hershey Wildcats and Atlanta Silverbacks. In 2006, he moved to Guayabo, another soccer team in the United States.

== National team ==
Tokpah made his international debut for Liberia in a 1996 African Cup of Nations qualifying match against Senegal on July 30, 1995.
