= Phakamani Mngadi =

South African footballer (born 1994)

Personal information
- Full name: Ndumiso Phakamani Sihle Mngadi
- Date of birth: 10 October 1994 (age 32)
- Place of birth: Pietermaritzburg, South Africa
- Positions: Midfielder; winger

Youth career
- Aspire Academy

Senior career*
Years	Team	Apps	(Gls)
2013–2017	Eupen	31	(5)
2014–2015	→ Kaizer Chiefs (loan)	1	(0)
2019–2020	Jomo Cosmos	6	(0)
- * Club domestic league appearances and goals

Ndumiso Phakamani Mngadi (born 10 October 1994) is a South African professional soccer player who most recently played as a midfielder or winger for Jomo Cosmos.

== Career ==
As a youth player, Mngadi joined the Qatari Aspire Academy. He started his career with Belgian side Eupen. In 2014, Mngadi was sent on loan to Kaizer Chiefs in the South African top flight. In 2019, he signed for South African second-tier club Jomo Cosmos, where he made six league appearances. On 20 November 2019, Mngadi debuted for Jomo Cosmos during a 1–0 win over Royal Eagles.
