= 1985 NSL First Division =

NSL First Division
- Season: 1985
- Champions: Bush Bucks
- Relegated: Benoni United; Cape Town Spurs
- Matches: 306
- Goals: 699 (2.28 per match)

The 1985 National Soccer League First Division was the first edition of the NSL First Division in South Africa. It was won by Durban-based Bush Bucks.

The other professional league, the Federation Professional League, continued to function independently.

== Table ==
Pos	Team	Pld	W	D	L	GF	GA	GD	Pts	Relegation
1	Durban Bush Bucks (C)	34	21	11	2	74	34	+40	53	
2	Rangers	34	20	10	4	60	32	+28	50	
3	Bloemfontein Celtic	34	14	15	5	50	28	+22	43	
4	Jomo Cosmos	34	17	8	9	47	31	+16	42	
5	Arcadia	34	16	8	10	49	45	+4	40	
6	Wits University	34	14	9	11	59	46	+13	37	
7	Durban City	34	15	7	12	50	46	+4	37	
8	Kaizer Chiefs	34	13	10	11	45	33	+12	36	
9	Moroka Swallows	34	13	9	12	53	54	−1	35	
10	Witbank Aces	34	14	7	13	52	53	−1	35	
11	Mamelodi Sundowns	34	10	11	13	34	42	−8	31	
12	Hellenic	34	11	9	14	35	47	−12	31	
13	AmaZulu	34	7	11	16	31	47	−16	25	
14	Pretoria Callies	34	7	11	16	23	40	−17	25	
15	Orlando Pirates	34	5	14	15	30	49	−19	24	
16	African Wanderers	34	6	11	17	27	46	−19	23	
17	Benoni United (R)	34	5	13	16	26	49	−23	23	Relegation to NSL Second Division
18	Cape Town Spurs (R)	34	6	10	18	44	67	−23	22	Relegation to NSL Second Division

(C) Champions; (R) Relegated
