= 1988 NSL First Division =

NSL First Division
- Season: 1988
- Champions: Mamelodi Sundowns
- Relegated: Umtata Bucks; Natal United

The 1988 National Soccer League First Division was the fourth edition of the National Soccer League First Division in South Africa. It was won by Mamelodi Sundowns.

The other professional league, the Federation Professional League, continued to function independently.

== Table ==
Pos	Team	Pld	W	D	L	GF	GA	GD	Pts	Relegation
1	Mamelodi Sundowns (C)	34	18	8	8	46	29	+17	44	
2	Jomo Cosmos	34	19	5	10	54	34	+20	43	
3	Arcadia	34	15	13	6	35	25	+10	43	
4	Kaizer Chiefs	34	15	12	7	56	31	+25	42	
5	Bloemfontein Celtic	34	13	16	5	47	25	+22	42	
6	Orlando Pirates	34	14	12	8	33	26	+7	40	
7	Wits University	34	14	11	9	49	40	+9	39	
8	Witbank Aces	34	11	15	8	34	38	−4	37	
9	Hellenic	34	10	13	11	41	42	−1	33	
10	Fairways Stars	34	9	15	10	37	49	−12	33	
11	Cape Town Spurs	34	11	8	15	40	39	+1	30	
12	Moroka Swallows	34	9	12	13	25	34	−9	30	
13	Rangers	34	10	9	15	36	47	−11	29	
14	Leeds United	34	9	10	15	44	51	−7	28	
15	Amazulu	34	10	8	16	38	45	−7	28	
16	Durban Bush Bucks	34	8	11	15	29	35	−6	27	
17	Umtata Bucks (R)	34	8	10	16	27	48	−21	26	Relegation to NSL Second Division
18	Natal United (R)	34	4	10	20	20	52	−32	18	Relegation to NSL Second Division

(C) Champions; (R) Relegated
