= Peter Gordon (South African soccer) =

South African soccer player

Personal information
- Date of birth: 23 December 1963 (age 62)
- Place of birth: South Africa
- Position: Defender

Senior career*
Years	Team	Apps	(Gls)
1987–2000	Wits University		

International career
1992	South Africa	1	(0)
- * Club domestic league appearances and goals

Peter Gordon (born 13 December 1963) is a South African former soccer player who played as a defender. He played for Wits University during his entire 13-year professional career. He holds the record for most goals and matches for Wits.

== International career ==
He played his only international match in a 4–0 loss against Nigeria in a Group D World Cup qualifier after coming in for Lucas Radebe in the 75th minute.
