= Duncan Crowie =

South African soccer player

Personal information
- Date of birth: 26 May 1963 (age 63)
- Place of birth: Cape Town, South Africa
- Position: Striker

Team information
- Current team: South Africa (manager)

Senior career*
Years	Team	Apps	(Gls)
1982–1986	Glendene United		
1987–2000	Lightbody's Santos		

International career
1992	South Africa	1	(0)

Managerial career
- 2011–2012: Engen Santos (assistant coach)
- 2012: Engen Santos (Interim)
- 2023-: South Africa U-17
- * Club domestic league appearances and goals

Duncan Crowie (born 29 May 1963) is a South African former soccer player who played as a striker. He mostly played for Santos Cape Town and played once for the South African national football team.

He was the top scorer in the 1989 Federation Professional League season with 19 goals, with Santos finishing second in the league.

He coached the South African national U-17 side at the 2023 Under-17 Africa Cup of Nations, taking the team to the quarter-finals.
