= 1991 NSL First Division =

NSL First Division
- Season: 1991
- Champions: Kaizer Chiefs
- Relegated: PE Blackpool; African Wanderers; Bosmont Chelsea; Real Taj

== Table ==
The 1991 National Soccer League First Division was the seventh edition of the NSL First Division in South Africa. It was won by Kaizer Chiefs.

Six teams from the Federation Professional League, the parallel top division, which folded in 1990, joined the league this season, expanding the number of teams to 24. The six teams were Real Taj, Tongaat Crusaders United, Bosmont Chelsea, Santos, Manning Rangers, Dangerous Darkies.

Pos	Team	Pld	W	D	L	GF	GA	GD	Pts	Relegation
1	Kaizer Chiefs (C)	34	26	5	3	84	20	+64	57	
2	Mamelodi Sundowns	34	22	9	3	62	18	+44	53	
3	Fairway Stars	34	17	12	5	45	25	+20	46	
4	Umtata Bush Bucks	34	17	10	7	51	28	+23	44	
5	Orlando Pirates	34	18	8	8	48	31	+17	44	
6	Moroka Swallows	34	16	11	7	55	30	+25	43	
7	Jomo Cosmos	34	16	9	9	58	34	+24	41	
8	Hellenic	34	17	7	10	59	43	+16	41	
9	Highlands Park	34	14	11	9	50	40	+10	39	
10	Dynamos	34	12	13	9	51	27	+24	37	
11	Wits University	34	13	11	10	61	40	+21	37	
12	Lightbody's Santos	34	14	9	11	51	39	+12	37	
13	Vaal Reef Stars	34	11	11	12	31	42	−11	33	
14	Bloemfontein Celtic	34	10	12	12	49	42	+7	32	
15	Witbank Aces	34	12	7	15	37	40	−3	31	
16	Pretoria City	34	9	13	12	27	44	−17	31	
17	Crusaders United	34	8	10	16	36	64	−28	26	
18	AmaZulu	34	8	9	17	33	51	−18	25	
19	Dangerous Darkies	34	8	8	18	28	62	−34	24	
20	Manning Rangers	34	8	7	19	29	53	−24	23	
21	PE Blackpool (R)	34	7	8	19	35	63	−28	22	Relegation to NSL Second Division
22	African Wanderers (R)	34	4	12	18	27	65	−38	20	Relegation to NSL Second Division
23	Bosmont Chelsea (R)	34	7	6	21	26	71	−45	20	Relegation to NSL Second Division
24	Real Taj (R)	34	3	4	27	25	86	−61	10	Relegation to NSL Second Division

(C) Champions; (R) Relegated
