= Telkom Charity Cup =

- Founded: 1986
- Region: South Africa
- Teams: 4
- Current champions: Kaizer Chiefs 11th
- Most championships: Kaizer Chiefs 11 titles
- Broadcaster(s): SuperSport, SABC
- Motto: It's your call
- Website: www.charitycup.co.za
- 2010 Telkom Charity Cup

The Telkom Charity Cup was a South African association football annual, one-day tournament for Premier Soccer League clubs. It was usually held in early August, as the season opening event. It was traditionally played at South Africa's premier football venue, Soccer City.

The qualifying criteria were unique: The public would vote by telephone for their favourite football team to participate. The four clubs with the most votes qualified for the tournament. The aim of the tournament was to raise money for charity through the votes and gate fees.

The four clubs selected to participate are drawn into two semi-finals, played one after the other. The two winning clubs then play in a final, later that evening.

The most successful coach in the competition has been Ted Dumitru, who recorded four wins.

In April 2011, the PSL announced that the tournament would be removed from the football calendar. Irvin Khoza, the PSL Chairman said the competition had "outlived its usefulness".

== Winners ==
Former Telkom Charity Cup logo

Year	Host	Winner	Winning Coach
Iwisa Maize Meal Soccer Spectacular
1986	Ellis Park	Kaizer Chiefs	Ted Dumitru
1987	Ellis Park	Kaizer Chiefs(2)	Ted Dumitru
1988	Ellis Park	Kaizer Chiefs(3)	Ted Dumitru
1989	Ellis Park	Kaizer Chiefs(4)	Jeff Butler
1990	Soccer City	Kaizer Chiefs(5)	Augusto Palacios
1991	Soccer City	Mamelodi Sundowns	Stanley Tshabalala
1992	Soccer City	Moroka Swallows	Eddie Lewis
1993	Soccer City	Orlando Pirates	Geoff Hudson
1994	Soccer City	Kaizer Chiefs(6)	Philippe Troussier
1995	Soccer City	Orlando Pirates(2)	Mike Makaab
1996	Soccer City	Kaizer Chiefs(7)	Jeff Butler
1997	Soccer City	Orlando Pirates(3)	Ronald Mkhandawire
1998	Soccer City	Kaizer Chiefs(8)	Paul Dolezar
Charity Spectacular
1999	Soccer City	Orlando Pirates(4)	Viktor Bondarenko
2000	Soccer City	Mamelodi Sundowns(2)	Neil Tovey
2001	Soccer City	Orlando Pirates(5)	Augusto Palacios
2002	Soccer City	Kaizer Chiefs(9)	Muhsin Ertugral
2003	Soccer City	Kaizer Chiefs(10)	Ted Dumitru
2004	Soccer City	Mamelodi Sundowns(3)	Paul Dolezar
2005	Soccer City	Mamelodi Sundowns(4)	Ángel Cappa
2006	Soccer City	Mamelodi Sundowns(5)	Neil Tovey
Telkom Charity Cup
2007	Mmabatho Stadium	Bloemfontein Celtic	Khabo Zondo
2008	Mmabatho Stadium	Orlando Pirates(6)	Ruud Krol
2009	Royal Bafokeng Stadium	Orlando Pirates(7)	Ruud Krol
2010	Soccer City	Kaizer Chiefs(11)	Vladimir Vermezović
