= 1994 NSL First Division =

NSL First Division
- Season: 1994
- Champions: Orlando Pirates
- Relegated: Pretoria City; Royal Tigers

The 1994 National Soccer League was the tenth edition of the NSL First Division in South Africa. It was won by Orlando Pirates.

Pos	Team	Pld	W	D	L	GF	GA	GD	Pts	Relegation
1	Orlando Pirates (Note: Orlando Pirates awarded an additional point) (C)	34	18	13	3	45	14	+31	50	
2	Cape Town Spurs	34	17	15	2	59	21	+38	49	
3	Umtata Bucks	34	18	5	11	51	32	+19	41	
4	Mamelodi Sundowns	34	18	5	11	64	47	+17	41	
5	Kaizer Chiefs	34	16	8	10	37	29	+8	40	
6	Hellenic	34	17	5	12	53	49	+4	39	
7	Wits University	34	14	10	10	38	24	+14	38	
8	Qwa Qwa Stars	34	11	15	8	41	33	+8	37	
9	Vaal Professionals (Note: Vaal Professionals deducted a point for failing to produce proof of identity for their players.)	34	10	17	7	36	38	−2	36	
10	Moroka Swallows	34	11	11	12	38	42	−4	33	
11	Witbank Aces	34	11	10	13	50	46	+4	32	
12	Real Rovers	34	12	8	14	57	62	−5	32	
13	Amazulu	34	10	10	14	32	41	−9	30	
14	Manning Rangers	34	8	13	13	31	36	−5	29	
15	Bloemfontein Celtic	34	12	4	18	51	58	−7	28	
16	D'Alberton Callies (Note: D'Alberton Callies disbanded following the season, selling their licence to Peter Rabali who created Rabali Blackpool.)	34	6	13	15	32	49	−17	25	
17	Pretoria City (R)	34	9	7	18	35	54	−19	25	Relegation to NSL Second Division
18	Royal Tigers (R)	34	1	5	28	16	91	−75	7	Relegation to NSL Second Division

(C) Champions; (R) Relegated
