= 1993 NSL First Division =

NSL First Division
- Season: 1993
- Champions: Mamelodi Sundowns
- Relegated: Dynamos; Jomo Cosmos; Lightbody's Santos; Welkom Eagles

The 1993 National Soccer League First Division was the ninth edition of the NSL First Division in South Africa. It was won by Mamelodi Sundowns.

Pos	Team	Pld	W	D	L	GF	GA	GD	Pts	Qualification or relegation
1	Mamelodi Sundowns (C)	38	24	7	7	69	31	+38	55	African Cup of Champions Clubs
2	Moroka Swallows	38	21	10	7	44	24	+20	52	CAF Cup
3	AmaZulu	38	17	14	7	43	34	+9	48	
4	Orlando Pirates F.C.	38	15	13	10	52	42	+10	43	
5	Umtata Bucks	38	15	12	11	51	43	+8	42	
6	Kaizer Chiefs	38	15	12	11	42	35	+7	42	
7	Hellenic	38	14	13	11	58	50	+8	41	
8	Chatsworth Rangers	38	10	20	8	46	37	+9	40	
9	Albany City	38	11	17	10	39	40	−1	39	
10	Cape Town Spurs	38	13	11	14	43	37	+6	37	
11	Bloemfontein Celtic	38	13	11	14	36	45	−9	37	
12	Vaal Professionals	38	10	16	12	49	44	+5	36	
13	Score Stars	38	10	16	12	40	38	+2	36	
14	Total Aces	36	13	10	13	48	49	−1	36	African Cup Winners' Cup
15	D'Alberton Callies	38	14	8	16	44	48	−4	36	
16	Wits University	38	14	8	16	37	42	−5	36	
17	Dynamos (R)	38	8	17	13	41	41	0	33	Relegation to NSL Second Division
18	Jomo Midas Cosmos (R)	38	10	12	16	39	48	−9	32	Relegation to NSL Second Division
19	Lightbody's Santos (R)	38	7	15	16	29	45	−16	29	Relegation to NSL Second Division
20	Welkom Eagles (R)	38	1	6	31	23	97	−74	8	Relegation to NSL Second Division

(C) Champions; (R) Relegated
