= 1986 NSL First Division =

NSL First Division
- Season: 1986
- Champions: Rangers
- Relegated: Klerksdorp City; Pretoria Callies
- Matches played: 306
- Goals scored: 861 (2.81 per match)

The 1986 National Soccer League First Division was the second season of the NSL First Division in South Africa. It was won by Rangers.

The other professional league, the Federation Professional League, continued to function independently.

== Table ==
Pos	Team	Pld	W	D	L	GF	GA	GD	Pts	Relegation
1	Rangers (C)	34	21	9	4	63	31	+32	51	
2	Durban Bush Bucks	34	20	7	7	60	38	+22	47	
3	AmaZulu F.C.	34	19	7	8	63	37	+26	45	
4	Kaizer Chiefs	34	17	10	7	57	39	+18	44	
5	Moroka Swallows	34	16	9	9	70	41	+29	41	
6	Arcadia	34	16	9	9	65	43	+22	41	
7	Mamelodi Sundowns	34	16	7	11	44	40	+4	39	
8	Wits University	34	13	11	10	49	37	+12	37	
9	Hellenic	34	14	7	13	47	39	+8	35	
10	Bloemfontein Celtic	34	13	8	13	47	39	+8	34	
11	Witbank Aces	34	12	8	14	50	45	+5	32	
12	Jomo Cosmos	34	12	8	14	49	45	+4	32	
13	Orlando Pirates	34	9	10	15	43	60	−17	28	
14	Qwa Qwa Stars	34	9	9	16	40	54	−14	27	
15	Durban City	33	5	14	14	49	59	−10	24	
16	African Wanderers	34	9	5	20	33	60	−27	23	
17	Klerksdorp City (R)	34	6	6	22	35	81	−46	18	Relegation to NSL Second Division
18	Pretoria Callies (R)	34	3	7	24	33	94	−61	13	Relegation to NSL Second Division

(C) Champions; (R) Relegated
