= Gerald Stober =

South African soccer player

Personal information
- Date of birth: 27 June 1969 (age 57)
- Place of birth: Cape Town, South Africa
- Position: Striker

Senior career*
Years	Team	Apps	(Gls)
1989–1993	Santos Cape Town		
1994–1997	Hellenic FC		

International career
1995–1996	South Africa	4	(0)
- * Club domestic league appearances and goals

Gerald Stober (born 27 June 1969) is a South African former football (soccer) striker.

== International career ==
He made his international debut on 22 November 1995 against Zambia as a substitute for Donald Khuse in the 60th minute. He played his last international on 24 April 1996 in a 3-2 loss to Brazil after coming in for Shaun Bartlett.

== After retirement ==
He works as a Consultant at Alacrity, an Information Technology in the Century City area. He also works as a pundit for UEFA Champions League matchdays on E.tv.
