= Battswood F.C. =

South African soccer club

Battswood A.F.C.
- Full name: Battswood Association Football Club
- Nickname: Battswood
- Founded: 1929
- Ground: William Herbert Sports Ground, Wynberg, Cape Town
- League: Premier League, CDFA, Western Cape
- Website: https://www.facebook.com/pg/BattswoodAFC

Battswood AFC is a South African football (soccer) club based in Cape Town that as of 2026 plays in the Cape District Football Association Premier League.

== History ==
The teachers and students of the Battswood Training College formed the Battswood Football Club in 1929. Initially called the "Battswood Collegians", the club joined the newly established Cape District Football Association as one of its founder member clubs.

In 1959, the club gained eleven trophies, and in 1964 the club won the prestigious Maggot Trophy competition, the highest knockout competition in the Western Province. In 1965, the club lost in the self-same competition in the semi-finals, against the eventual winners, after three replays. In 1966 and 1968, the club lost in the final – in each match, the team was beaten by Woodside.

Due to political policy, the Cape District Football Union was suspended from the Western Province Football Board from 1978 until 1980.

=== Professional ranks ===
In 1989, the club turned professional, joining the South African Federation Professional League (FPL). In the first season, the club won the League, Knock-Out Cup (Osman’s Spice Trophy) and the NRB Cup, plus several individual awards. In 1990, the club again won the NRB Cup, and ended up as runners-up in the League, losing in the semi-finals of the Knock-Out Cup to the eventual winners, Santos.

In 1991, with huge political changes starting to take place in the country and with sports becoming unified, a major decision by the Federation Professional League meant that Battswood had to compete in the NSL 1st Division (Coastal League). The club just missed promotion, losing out to Cape Town Spurs.

=== Amateur ranks ===
Battswood have played for many years in the amateur ranks. In May 2026, the club received a kit sponsorship, and was able to fully kit out the club for the first time in 30 to 40 years. Fain Sports are the official Battswood kit supplier.

== Honours ==
- 1989 Federation Professional League champions
- 1989 SASF Cup champions
