= 1991 NSL Second Division =

NSL Second Division
- Season: 1991
- Champions: Cape Town Spurs
- Promoted: Cape Town Spurs; Ratanang
- Relegated: Bluebells United; De Beers; Fordsburg City; Jasair Birds; Kroonstad Rabbits; Leicester City; Neac All Stars; Rockridge; Tembu Royals F.C.; Zulu Royals; Bush Bucks; Real Aces; Umtata Liverpool; Berea; Maritzburg United; Coronation

The 1991 NSL Second Division (known as the OK League for sponsorship reasons) was the seventh edition of the second tier competition organised by the National Soccer League. It was divided into two divisions known as streams.

== Streams ==
=== O-Stream ===
Club	City	Home venue
Benoni Wanderers	Benoni	Northmead
Bluebells United	Lenasia	Lenasia
Boksburg	Boksburg	Prince George Park
De Beers	Johannesburg	George Goch
Fordsburg City	Johannesburg	Union
Health Centre Utd	Bushbuckridge	Pauliana
Jasair Birds	Pretoria	Laudium
Leicester City	Klerksdorp	Alabana
Kroonstad Rabbits	Kroonstad	Seisoville
Manchester City	Benoni	Wattville/Actonville
Neac All Stars	Dobsonville	Dobsonville
Pretoria Callies	Pretoria	Super
Ratanang	Phuthaditjhaba	Phuthaditjhaba
Ravens	Bloemfontein	Seisa Ramabodu
Real Rovers	Potgietersrus	Mahwelereng
Rockridge	Johannesburg	Orlando
Sparkling Monarchs	Wonderkop	Wonderkop
Swaraj United	Johannesburg	Lenasia
Vaal Professionals	Sharpville	George Thabe
Zola United Stars	Johannesburg	Orlando

Pos	Team	Pld	W	D	L	GF	GA	GD	Pts	Promotion, qualification or relegation
1	Ratanang (P)	38	26	8	4	82	34	+48	60	Qualification to Championship playoff Promotion to NFL First Division
2	Vaal Professionals	38	23	9	6	70	29	+41	55	
3	Ravens	38	22	8	8	73	42	+31	52	
4	Boksburg	38	21	9	8	63	33	+30	51	
5	Benoni Wanderers (Note: Also referred to as Benoni Northerners)	38	16	13	9	66	37	+29	45	
6	Pretoria Callies	38	18	8	12	66	61	+5	44	
7	Real Rovers	38	15	13	10	68	52	+16	43	
8	Swaraj United	38	15	12	11	60	42	+18	42	
9	Zola United Stars (Note: Also referred to as Zola Real Young Stars)	38	16	9	13	55	47	+8	41	
10	Sparkling Monarchs	38	13	15	10	52	47	+5	41	
11	Health Centre United	38	17	6	15	58	55	+3	40	
12	Manchester City	38	15	8	15	65	61	+4	38	
13	Bluebells United (R)	36	14	10	12	58	63	−5	38	Relegation to SASA Third Division
14	Kroonstad Rabbits (R)	38	11	7	20	56	76	−20	29	Relegation to SASA Third Division
15	Leicester City (R)	38	10	6	22	50	82	−32	26	Relegation to SASA Third Division
16	Neac All Stars (R)	38	6	13	19	44	80	−36	25	Relegation to SASA Third Division
17	Fordsburg City (R)	38	8	8	22	35	76	−41	24	Relegation to SASA Third Division
18	Jasair Birds (R)	38	9	7	22	49	83	−34	25	Relegation to SASA Third Division
19	Rockridge (R)	38	6	8	24	31	58	−27	20	Relegation to SASA Third Division
20	De Beers (R)	38	5	10	23	31	62	−31	20	Relegation to SASA Third Division

(P) Promoted; (R) Relegated

=== K-Stream ===
Club	City	Home venue
Battswood	Cape Town	Athlone
Berea	Durban	Chartsworth
Blackburn Rovers	Butterworth	Umsobomvu
Bush Bucks	Durban	Glebe
Cape Town Spurs	Cape Town	Parow
Coronation	Durban	Curries Fountain
Crystal Brains	Durban	Umlazi
D'Alberton Callies	Durban	Curries Fountain
Dynamos	Newcastle	KR Rumelin Stadium
E.L. Bluebells	East London	North End; Bisho
Hotspurs	Port Elizabeth	Adcock
Manchester United	Escourt	Forderville
Maritzburg United	Pietermaritzburg	Northdale
P.E. Callies	Port Elizabeth	Adcock
Real Aces	Vryheid	Hlobane
Royal Tigers	Durban	S J Smith
Stanger United	Stanger	Stanger
Tembu Royals F.C.	Umtata	Independence
Umtata Liverpool	Umtata	Matatiele; Independence
Zulu Royals	Durban	Kwa Mashu

Pos	Team	Pld	W	D	L	GF	GA	GD	Pts	Promotion, qualification or relegation
1	Cape Town Spurs (C, P)	38	28	5	5	115	23	+92	61	Qualification to Championship Playoff; Promotion to NFL First Division
2	Battswood	38	26	6	6	99	33	+66	58	
3	P.E Callies	38	21	12	5	67	32	+35	54	
4	Royal Tigers	38	19	12	7	68	41	+27	50	
5	Crystal Brains	38	20	7	11	57	47	+10	47	
6	Hotspurs	38	16	13	9	58	40	+18	45	
7	EL Bluebells	38	18	9	11	62	53	+9	45	
8	D'Alberton Callies	38	16	10	12	68	55	+13	42	
9	Dynamos (Note: Dynamos F.C. is referred to as both Chippa Dynamosand Iscor Dynamos in the PSL General Meeting minutes.)	38	13	11	14	61	68	−7	37	
10	Manchester United	38	12	10	16	36	44	−8	34	
11	Blackburn Rovers	38	12	10	16	46	57	−11	34	
12	Stanger United	37	11	12	14	50	59	−9	34	
13	Tembu Royals F.C. (Note: Tembu Royals F.C. was known as Grinaker Tembu Royals due to a sponsorship with construction group Grinaker.) (R)	38	12	9	17	39	46	−7	33	Relegation to SASA Third Division
14	Zulu Royals (R)	38	11	11	16	42	57	−15	33	Relegation to SASA Third Division
15	Bush Bucks (R)	38	9	14	15	34	46	−12	32	Relegation to SASA Third Division
16	Real Aces (R)	38	9	8	21	45	67	−22	26	Relegation to SASA Third Division
17	Umtata Liverpool (R)	37	9	8	20	42	70	−28	26	Relegation to SASA Third Division
18	Berea (R)	38	9	7	22	37	75	−38	25	Relegation to SASA Third Division
19	Maritzburg United (R)	38	8	8	22	48	107	−59	24	Relegation to SASA Third Division
20	Coronation (R)	38	3	12	23	28	83	−55	18	Relegation to SASA Third Division

(C) Champions; (P) Promoted; (R) Relegated

== Championship playoff ==
1 December 1991

Cape Town Spurs	4-1	Ratanang

Hartleyvale Stadium, Cape Town

7 December 1991

Ratanang	Unknown	Cape Town Spurs

FNB Stadium, Johannesburg

Cape Town Spurs won the Championship.

== The New Republic Bank Knockout Cup ==
A new cup for the NSL Second Divisions teams was introduced in 1991 sponsored by the New Republic Bank. Sixteen clubs in total entered the competition, 8 from each stream.

Final
24 August 1991

Cape Town Spurs	Unknown	Vaal Professionals

FNB Stadium, Johannesburg

Cape Town Spurs won the Knockout Cup.
