= Bush Bucks F.C. =

Bush Bucks
- Full name: Bush Bucks Football Club
- Nicknames: Imbabala (The Bucks)
- Founded: 1957
- Ground: North End Stadium
- Chairman: Sturu Pasiya
- League: SAFA Second Division
- 2023–24: 6th, Stream A

Bush Bucks is a South African soccer club. The club was founded in 1957 by Dr Dan Pasiya the one who brought it from the Owner who relocated from Durban to Mthatha and originally based in Mthatha in the Eastern Cape. In 2001, the team moved to East London because Mr Pasiya wanted to focus in other business that he owned so he gave the team to his son Sturu Pasiya. It was nicknamed Imbabala (The Bucks).

== History ==
The club was formed by a former official of the Bush Bucks club from Durban who had moved to the area. It was named Umtata Bush Bucks. They moved to East London (outside of the former homeland of Transkei) in 2001, until suffering relegation at the end of the 2002/03 season. They returned after only one season, but were relegated again at the end of 2005/06 season.

In 2007 Sturu Pasiya became the sole owner when he purchased a license to participate in the SAFA Second Division from Lion City FC. In 2019, Pasiya was sentenced to five years imprisonment for tax offences.

The club relocated to Mthatha prior to the start of the 2022–23 season.

The club plays in the SAFA Second Division Eastern Cape division.

=== League record ===
==== National Soccer League ====
- 1988;– 17th (relegated)
- 1990;– 7th
- 1991;– 4th
- 1992;– 17th
- 1993;– 5th
- 1994;– 3rd
- 1995;– 6th

==== Premiership ====
- 1996–97;– 4th
- 1997–98;– 6th
- 1998–99;– 9th
- 1999–2000;– 13th
- 2000–01 – 10th
- 2001–02 – 15th
- 2002–03 – 15th (relegated)

==== National First Division ====
- 2003–04 – 1st (promoted)

==== Premiership ====
- 2004–05 – 11th
- 2005–06 – 15th (relegated)

==== SAFA Second Division Eastern Cape Stream ====
- 2018–19 – 14th
- 2019–20 – 4th
- 2020–21 – 4th Stream A
- 2021–22 – 5th Stream A
- 2022–23 – 8th Stream A
- 2023–24 – 6th Stream A
- 2024–25 – 7th Inland Stream
