= Durban City F.C. (2024) =

South African association football club

Durban City
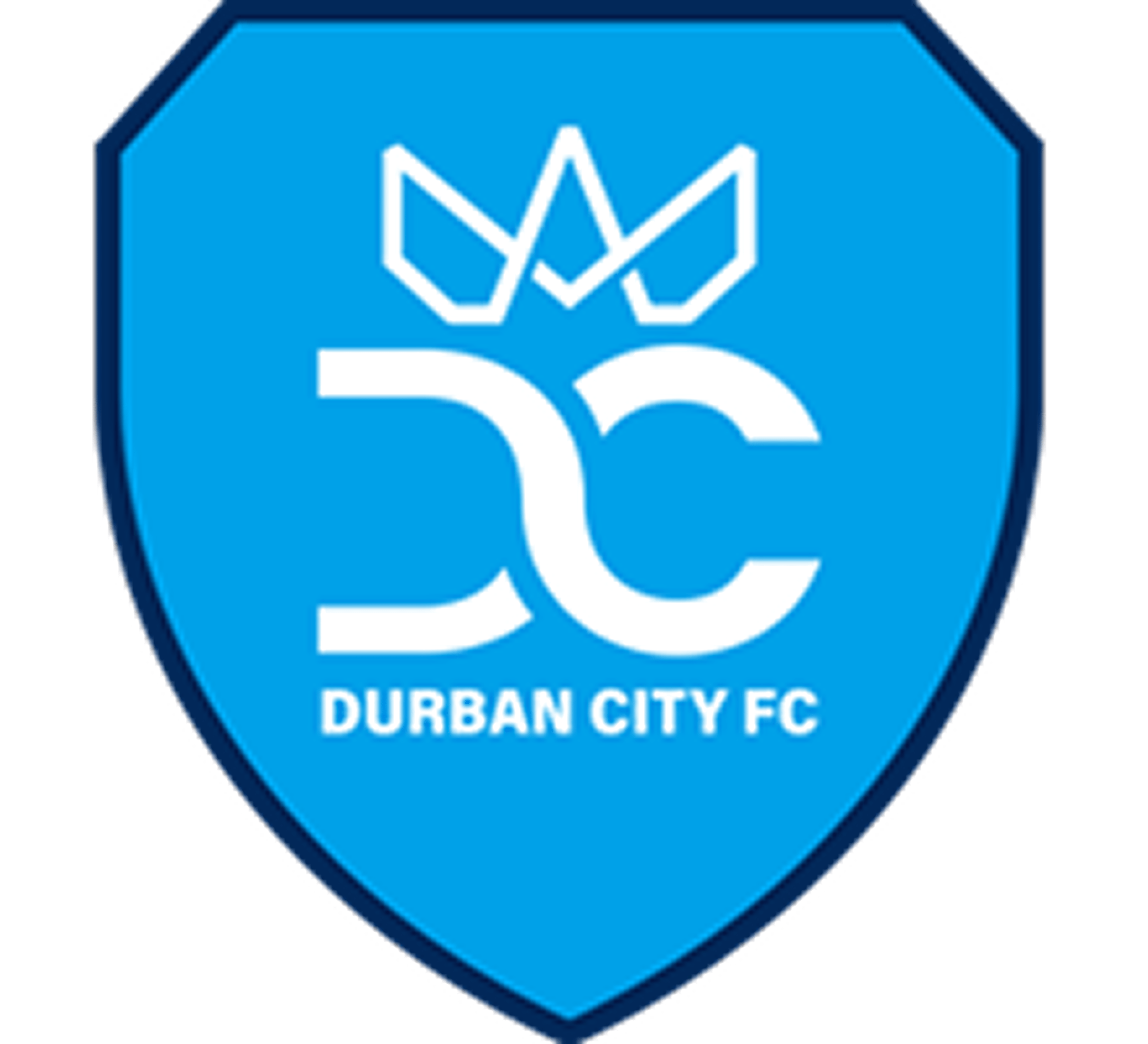
- Full name: Durban City Football Club
- Nickname: Citizens
- Founded: 1981; 45 years ago as Maritzburg United; 2024; 2 years ago as Durban City Football Club
- Ground: Chatsworth Stadium
- Capacity: 22,000
- Chairman: Farook Kadodia
- Manager: Eric Tinkler
- League: South African Premiership
- 2025–26: 8th of 16
- Website: durbancityfc.com

Durban City is a South African football club based in the city of Durban. Until August 2024, the club was called Maritzburg United, and was based in the city of Pietermaritzburg. In its first season under the new name, the club won promotion to the Premiership at the end of the 2024–25 National First Division season.

== History ==
=== Federation Professional League ===
The club was formed in 1981 and initially played in the Federation Professional League (FPL).

Following the end of the FPL in December 1990, Maritzburg United was not one of the six FPL clubs going forward to play in the National Soccer League.

=== Revival as Maritzburg United ===
Talks to revive the club began in 2003, with Maritzburg United playing in the 2004–05 National First Division.

In 2005, the club purchased the status of Tembisa Classic in order to play in the Premiership, playing under that name in the 2005–06 South African Premiership. The club was relegated in its second season in the top tier, finishing bottom of the 2006–07 South African Premiership.

It was immediately promoted, winning the 2007–08 National First Division, and then spent consecutive seasons from 2008 until 2023 in the Premiership, before finally being condemned to the playoffs on goal difference and suffering relegation from the 2022–23 South African Premiership.

=== Move to Durban ===
In August 2024, the club announced that it was changing its name to Durban City and moving from Pietermaritzburg to Chatsworth in Durban. After its relegation from the 2022–23 Premiership, the club was barred by the Msunduzi Local Municipality from using the Harry Gwala Stadium, which was reserved for Royal AM and was forced to play its home games at the Sugar Ray Xulu Stadium in Durban, far from its fan base. With the club incurring an extra R60 000 in expenses for each home game as a result, the club decided to rebase in Durban.

The club appointed veteran coach Gavin Hunt prior to the start of the season. With the club in mid-table, Hunt was dismissed, purportedly for not developing youth players according to the owner's wishes.

The club won the 2025–26 Nedbank Cup after a come from behind win against TS Galaxy.

== Honours ==
- Nedbank Cup: 2025–26
- National First Division: 2007–08, 2024–25

== Club records ==
- Most starts: (South Africa) Shu-Aib Walters & (South Africa) Peter Petersen 107
- Most goals: (South Africa) Fadlu Davids 20
- Most starts in a season: (South Africa) Shu-Aib Walters & (South Africa) Mario Booysen 35 (2012/13)
- Most goals in a season: (Zimbabwe) Cuthbert Malajila 13 (2012/13)
- Record victory: 4–0 vs Bloemfontein Celtic (12/01/18, PSL)
- Record defeat: 0–7 vs SuperSport United (14/10/11, PSL)

=== Record ===
==== Federation Professional League ====
- 1989 – 10th
- 1990 – 7th

==== National First Division ====
- 2004–05 – 5th

==== Premiership ====
- 2005–06 – 14th (as Tembisa Classic)
- 2006–07 – 16th (relegated)

==== National First Division ====
- 2007–08 – 1st Coastal Stream, Champions (promoted)

==== Premiership ====
- 2008–09 – 12th
- 2009–10 – 11th
- 2010–11 – 12th
- 2011–12 – 11th
- 2012–13 – 11th
- 2013–14 – 10th
- 2014–15 – 8th
- 2015–16 – 14th
- 2016–17 – 7th
- 2017–18 – 4th
- 2018–19 – 15th
- 2019–20 – 7th
- 2020–21 – 13th
- 2021–22 – 12th
- 2022–23 – 15th (relegated)

==== National First Division ====
- 2023–24 – 4th
- 2024–25 – 1st (promoted)

==== Premiership ====
- 2025–26 – 8th

== Current squad ==
As of 21 August 2026

Note: Flags indicate national team as defined under FIFA eligibility rules; some limited exceptions apply. Players may hold more than one non-FIFA nationality.

No.	Pos.	Nation	Player
1	GK	RSA	Darren Keet
2	DF	RSA	Bandile Shandu
3	MF	RSA	Bongani Mthembu
4	DF	RSA	Fezile Gcaba
5	DF	RSA	Siphamandla Ncanana
6	MF	NGR	Collins Nwoburuoke
7	MF	RSA	Haashim Domingo
8	MF	URU	Gastón Sirino
9	FW	RSA	Tashreeq Morris
10	FW	RSA	Samkelo Maseko
12	DF	RSA	Kabelo Mofokeng
13	FW	RSA	Seth Green
15	MF	RSA	Bokang Mokwena
16	MF	RSA	Lifa Makua
17	DF	RSA	Kyle Jurgens

No.	Pos.	Nation	Player
18	MF	RSA	Brooklyn Poggenpoel
19	FW	RSA	Letsie Koapeng
20	FW	COD	Jean Lwamba
22	DF	RSA	Liam de Kock
23	MF	RSA	Tylo Sanger
26	MF	RSA	Thabo Nodada
29	DF	MLI	Alou Doumbia
30	DF	RSA	Mfanafuthi Mkhize
33	GK	GHA	Fredrick Asare
34	GK	RSA	Aden Dreyer
35	MF	RSA	Luphumlo Sifumba
50	DF	RSA	Nkanyiso Madonsela
—	MF	RSA	Ethan Brooks

== Notable former coaches ==
- (South Africa) Trott Moloto (2004)
- (South Africa) Boebie Solomons (1 July 2004 – 30 June 2005)
- (Serbia) Kosta Papić (1 July 2006 – 20 Dec 2006)
- (South Africa) Steve Komphela (1 Jan 2007 – 9 Jan 2007)
- (Serbia) Vladislav Herić (10 Jan 2007 – 6 March 2007)
- (South Africa) Mlungisi Ngubane (8 March 2007 – 30 June 2007)
- (South Africa) Ian Palmer (1 July 2007 – 10 July 2008)
- (South Africa) Gordon Igesund (15 July 2008 – 15 Nov 2009)
- (Germany) Ernst Middendorp (16 Nov 2009 – 12 March 2011)
- (South Africa) Ian Palmer (14 March 2011 – 13 Jan 2012)
- (Germany) Ernst Middendorp (19 Jan 2012 – 10 Oct 2013)
- (South Africa) Clinton Larsen (15 Oct 2013 – 6 Jan 2014)
- (South Africa) Steve Komphela (6 Jan 2014 – 17 June 2015)
- (South Africa) Clive Barker (25 Sep 2015 – 1 Dec 2015)
- (Germany) Ernst Middendorp (28 Dec 2015 – 28 Nov 2016)
- (Mozambique) Roger De Sa (10 Jan 2017 – 23 Mar 2017)
- (South Africa) Gavin Hunt (2025 – 2025)
- (South Africa) Sinethemba Badela (2025 – 2026)
- (South Africa) Pitso Dladla (2026 – 2026)
- (Tunisia) Khalil Ben Youssef (2026 – 2026 )
- (South Africa) Eric Tinkler (2026 – )
