= 1992 NSL First Division =

NSL First Division
- Season: 1992
- Champions: Kaizer Chiefs
- Relegated: Crusaders United; Vaal Reef Stars; Manning Rangers; Dangerous Darkies
- Matches played: 484
- Goals scored: 1,054 (2.18 per match)
- Top goalscorer: (20 goals); George Deamaley; Mark Williams
- Biggest home win: Hellenic 6-0 Crusaders; Jomo Cosmos 6-0 Umtata Bush Bucks
- Highest scoring: 6-0
- Longest winning run: 9
- Longest unbeaten run: 14
- Longest winless run: 7
- Longest losing run: 8

== Table ==
The 1992 National Soccer League First Division was the eighth edition of the NSL First Division in South Africa. It was won by Kaizer Chiefs.

Pos	Team	Pld	W	D	L	GF	GA	GD	Pts	Relegation
1	Kaizer Chiefs (C)	42	24	12	6	70	22	+48	60	
2	Hellenic	42	23	11	8	82	39	+43	57	
3	Wits University	42	20	11	11	53	29	+24	51	
4	Orlando Pirates	42	21	8	13	47	41	+6	50	
5	Jomo Cosmos	42	18	11	13	64	49	+15	47	
6	Mamelodi Sundowns	42	16	15	11	62	49	+13	47	
7	Witbank Aces	42	17	13	12	47	38	+9	47	
8	Lightbody's Santos	42	15	17	10	46	41	+5	47	
9	Moroka Swallows	42	17	11	14	53	46	+7	45	
10	Cape Town Spurs	42	13	17	12	47	43	+4	43	
11	Fairway Stars	42	15	13	14	40	40	0	43	
12	Ratanang Mahlosiane (Note: Ratanang Mahlosiane F.C. was purchased by the owners of relegated Manning Rangers following the season. A new club was created with the franchise license located in Chatsworth, KwaZulu-Natal and branded as Chatsworth Rangers F.C.)	42	14	15	13	40	40	0	43	
13	Halls Dynamos	42	14	15	13	53	56	−3	43	
14	Bloemfontein Celtic	42	12	17	13	54	49	+5	41	
15	AmaZulu	42	13	15	14	47	48	−1	41	
16	Pretoria City	42	16	7	19	47	53	−6	39	
17	Umtata Bush Bucks	42	12	14	16	33	42	−9	38	
18	Highlands Park	42	13	11	18	36	38	−2	37	
19	Crusaders United (R)	42	11	13	18	34	58	−24	35	Relegation to NSL Second Division
20	Vaal Reef Stars (R)	42	12	10	20	32	53	−21	34	Relegation to NSL Second Division
21	Manning Rangers (R)	42	9	11	22	40	58	−18	29	Relegation to NSL Second Division
22	Dangerous Darkies (R)	42	1	5	36	27	122	−95	7	Relegation to NSL Second Division

(C) Champions; (R) Relegated
