= Jomo Cosmos F.C. =

Jomo Cosmos
- Full name: Jomo Cosmos Football Club
- Nickname: Ezenkosi (Royals)
- Founded: 29 January 1983; 43 years ago
- Ground: Profert Olën Park
- Capacity: 22,000
- Chairman: Jomo Sono
- Coach: Jomo Sono
- League: ABC Motsepe League
- 2025–26: 13th
Home colours	Away colours

Jomo Cosmos is a South African soccer club based in Johannesburg that plays in the ABC Motsepe League. The club is owned and coached by South African football legend Jomo Sono.

At the end of the 2021–22 National First Division season, the club was relegated to the third tier of football in South Africa for the first time.

== History ==
The club was founded on 29 January 1983, upon the remnants of the previously well-known and successful club Highlands Park, which Sono opted to buy when he ended his playing career in the United States. The club was named Dion Cosmos in its initial 1983 season, with the first part of the name representing the previous sponsor of Highlands Park and the second part being the fingerprint of Jomo Sono, who decided to name his newly bought club after his former NASL club, the New York Cosmos. Since 1984, the name of the club has been Jomo Cosmos.

Sono's policy for development has always been to recognise and build upon raw talent. Sono's team accentuated and developed a strong youth policy and through the years has gained a reputation for discovering and developing some of the finest talent to have played in the league, for the South Africa national team and abroad. Under Sono's ownership, the club went on to achieve several successes: winning the NSL First Division title in 1987, the Bob Save Super Bowl in 1990, the Coca-Cola Cup in 2002 and 2005, and the SAA Supa 8 in 2003.

In 2008, Jomo Cosmos were relegated from top-flight football for the first time since 1993. After one season in the National First Division, they returned to the Premiership for the 2009–10 season, having won the Inland Stream and the promotion play-off against Carara Kicks. They were immediately relegated again, leading several to question Sono's future as the club's manager. Sono stayed, and led the club to the 2010–11 National First Division title and promotion. They were yet again relegated in their first season back, finishing in last place. They would stay in the second tier for three seasons, before winning promotion through the 2014-15 PSL play-off tournament. Cosmos were relegated again in their first season back, after losing 3–1 to Maritzburg United on the final day, ending the season in last place.

== Honours ==
- League Cup (Coca-Cola Cup): 2

2002, 2005

- Top 8: 1

2003

- Nedbank Cup: 1

1990

- NSL: 1

1987

- National First Division: 2

2008–09, 2010–11

- Second Division: 1

1994

== Club records ==
- Most starts: (South Africa) Andrew Rabutla 229
- Most goals: (Mozambique) Manuel Bucuane 88
- Most capped player: (Mozambique) Manuel Bucuane
- Most starts in a season: Webster Lichaba (1986), (South Africa) Helman Mkhalele (1993) both 46
- Most goals in a season: (South Africa) Philemon Masinga 27 (1991)
- Record victory: 6–0 vs Grand All Stars (31 August 1985), (Mainstay Cup); vs Mabopane United Brothers (30 August 1986), (Mainstay Cup);
  vs Umtata Bush Bucks (28 March 1992), (NSL); vs Denver Sundowns (21 February 1993), (African Cup Winners Cup)
- Record defeat: 0–5 vs Kaizer Chiefs (24 December 2001), (Coca-Cola Cup)

=== League record ===
==== National Professional Soccer League ====
- 1983 – 9th
- 1984 – 9th

==== National Soccer League ====
- 1985 – 4th
- 1986 – 12th
- 1987 – 1st
- 1988 – 2nd
- 1989 – 4th
- 1990 – 5th
- 1991 – 7th
- 1992 – 5th
- 1993 – 18th (relegated)

==== NSL Second Division ====
- 1994 – 2nd (promoted)

==== National Soccer League ====
- 1995 – 10th

==== South African Premiership ====
- 1996–97 – 7th
- 1997–98 – 7th
- 1998–99 – 10th
- 1999–00 – 7th
- 2000–01 – 4th
- 2001–02 – 4th
- 2002–03 – 8th
- 2003–04 – 13th
- 2004–05 – 13th
- 2005–06 – 9th
- 2006–07 – 7th
- 2007–08 – 16th (relegated)

==== National First Division ====
- 2008–09 – 1st (promoted)

==== South African Premiership ====
- 2009–10 – 16th (relegated)

==== National First Division ====
- 2010–11 – 1st (promoted)

==== South African Premiership ====
- 2011–12 – 16th (relegated)

==== National First Division ====
- 2012–13 – 14th
- 2013–14 – 6th
- 2014–15 – 2nd (promoted)

==== South African Premiership ====
- 2015–16 – 16th (relegated)

==== National First Division ====
- 2016–17 – 10th
- 2017-18 – 3rd
- 2018-19 – 13th
- 2019-20 - 13th
- 2020-21 - 9th
- 2021-22 - 15th (relegated)

==== SAFA Second Division (Gauteng stream) ====
- 2022–23 – 3rd
- 2023–24 – 4th
- 2024–25 – 14th
- 2025–26 – 13th
