= Rabali Blackpool =

- Founded: 1994
- Dissolved: 1995

Rabali Blackpool is a former South African football club.

The club was created when the league franchise was purchased by businessman Peter Rabali from D'Alberton Callies following the 1994 National Soccer League season. Rabali relocated the club to Thohoyandou and renamed the club to Rabali Blackpool.

The club were relegated from the National Soccer League in 1995.

== League History ==
Year	Competition	Final Position	Games Played	Games Won	Games Drew	Games Lost	Goals For	Goals Against	Points	Notes
1995	National Soccer League	18	34	5	9	21	34	56	19	Relegated
