= Dangerous Darkies F.C. =

South African football club

Dangerous Darkies
- Founded: 1991
- Ground: Nelspruit

Dangerous Darkies were a former South African association football club from Nelspruit. The club played in the National Soccer League from 1991 to 1992. In the late 1990s the club merged with the other big Mpumalanga team Witbank Aces to form Mpumalanga Black Aces F.C.

== League Placing ==
Year	League	Position	Played	Won	Drew	Lost	Goals For	Goals Against	Total Points
1991	NSL Castle League	19	34	8	8	18	28	−62	24
1992	NSL Castle League	22	42	1	5	36	27	−122	7
