= Federation Professional League =

- Founded: 1969
- Folded: 1990
- Country: South Africa
- Most championships: Cape Town Spurs (7 titles)

The Federation Professional League (FPL) was a South African association football league founded in 1969. At the time, under the country's apartheid policies, integrated sport was prohibited, and the National Football League (NFL) existed as a separate league for white teams only. The FPL was established as a non-racial league in the wake of the SASL's disbandment in 1967.

== Previous winners ==
| Year | Winner | Runner-up | Third-place |
FPL League
| 1969 | Verulam Suburbs | | |
| 1970 | Cape Town Spurs | | |
Mainstay League
| 1971 | Cape Town Spurs | | |
| 1972 | Glenville | | |
| 1973 | Cape Town Spurs | | |
| 1974 | Cape Town Spurs | | |
| 1975 | Berea | | |
| 1976 | Cape Town Spurs | | |
| 1977 | Swaraj United | | |
FPL Castle League
| 1978 | Durban City | | |
Seven Seas League
| 1979 | Cape Town Spurs | | |
| 1980 | Glenville | | |
| 1981 | Cape Town Spurs | | |
| 1982 | Glendene | | |
| 1983 | Lightbody's Santos | | |
| 1984 | Lightbody's Santos | | |
Quindrink League
| 1985 | Swaraj United | | |
La Mercy Beach League
| 1986 | Lightbody's Santos | | |
| 1987 | Lightbody's Santos | | |
| 1988 | Lightbody's Santos | | |
| 1989 | Battswood | | |
| 1990 | Lightbody's Santos | Battswood F.C. | Port Elizabeth Blackpool |

When the league folded in December 1990, six teams continued for the next season, at the highest level of South African football, known as NSL Castle League. Those six highest ranked teams were: Real Taj, Tongaat Crusaders United, Bosmont Chelsea, Santos, Manning Rangers, Dangerous Darkies.

| Team | Titles | Years |
|---|---|---|
| Cape Town Spurs | 7 | 1970, 1971, 1973, 1974, 1976, 1979, 1981 |
| Lightbody's Santos | 6 | 1983, 1984, 1986, 1987, 1988, 1990 |
| Glenville | 2 | 1972, 1980 |
| Swaraj United | 2 | 1977, 1985 |
| Verulam Suburbs | 1 | 1969 |
| Berea | 1 | 1975 |
| Durban City | 1 | 1978 |
| Glendene | 1 | 1982 |
| Battswood | 1 | 1989 |

== Player awards ==
=== Player of the year ===
| Year | Player | Club |
|---|---|---|
| 1973 | Danny Abrahams | Cape Town Spurs |
| 1974 | Daya Maistry | Berea |
| 1975 | Virgil Padayachee | Swaraj |
| 1976 | Michael Moodley | Manning Rangers |
| 1977 | Bernie Van Niekerk | Cape Town Spurs |
| 1978 | Deena Nai- doo | Manning Rangers |
| 1979 | Paul Bishop | Avalon Athletic |
| 1980 | Boebie Solomons | Cape Town Spurs |
| 1981 | Edwin Fredericks | Berea |
| 1982 | Noel Goodall | Chelsea |
| 1983 | Farouk Abrahams | Maritzburg United |
| 1984 | Ravi Pillay | Maritzburg United |
| 1985 | Der- eck Naidoo | Manning Rangers |
| 1986 | Dorrington Webster | Real Taj |

=== Top goalscorers ===
| Year | Player | Club |
|---|---|---|
| 1970 | Bernard Hartze | Cape Town Spurs |
| 1971 | Bernard Hartze | Cape Town Spurs |
| 1972 | Patrick "Bomber" Chamane | Maritzburg City |
| 1973 | James George | Cape Town Spurs |
| 1974 | Neville Londt | Cape Town Spurs |
| 1975 | Scampy Bissessor | Berea |
| 1976 | Vincent Julius | Sundowns |
| 1977 | Jimmy Joubert | Swaraj |
| 1978 | Ian Gillies | Maritzburg City |
| 1979 | Kader Sulia- man | Cape Town Spurs |
| 1980 | Elvis Singh | Leeds |
| 1981 | Kader Sulaiman | Cape Town Spurs |
| 1982 | Duncan Crowie | Glendene |
| 1983 | Duncan Crowie | Glendene |
| 1984 | Derrick Eastwood | Swaraj |
| 1985 | Michael Mtshali | Real Taj |
| 1986 | Harry de la Cruz | Maritzburg United |
| 1987 | | |
| 1988 | | |
| 1989 | Duncan Crowie | Lightbody's Santos |
| 1990 | | |
