= Manning Rangers F.C. =

Association football club in South Africa

Manning Rangers
- Full name: Manning Rangers Football Club
- Nickname: The Mighty Maulers
- Founded: 1928
- Dissolved: 2006
- Ground: Chatsworth Stadium (The Den), Durban
- Capacity: 22,000
Home colours	Away colours

Manning Rangers was a South African football club based in Durban. The side is best remembered as the inaugural champions of the Premiership, the first in the Premier Soccer League era.

== History ==
The club was founded in 1928 by GR Naidoo who, as well as administering the club, played as its goalkeeper and was later a referee. In the mid-1960s, the club entered the professional ranks under the auspices of the South African Soccer League. In 1985, the club moved its base from Curries Fountain to Chatsworth. The club entered the 1st Division of the National Soccer League (NSL) in 1991.

In 2006, the club declared bankruptcy. The Fidentia Group purchased the club in 2007, renaming it Fidentia Rangers before moving the club from Durban to Cape Town as Ikapa Sporting.

The club was reformed and as of 2023 plays in the amateur leagues.

== 1996–97 season ==
In the inaugural 1996–97 season of the Premiership, the unfancied Maulers, then under the leadership of chairman Kaycee Reddy and coached by Gordon Igesund, caused a major upset by winning the league, finishing with a 23–5–6 record and on 74 points, ahead of bigger clubs such as Kaizer Chiefs, Mamelodi Sundowns and Orlando Pirates.

The club remained in the Premiership for several seasons. In 1998–99 the team represented South Africa in the CAF Champions League losing out to eventual winners ASEC Abidjan of Côte d'Ivoire.

== Notable players ==
- (South Africa) Mark Davies Most appearances for the club.
- (South Africa) Simon Makhubela Most goals for the club.
- (South Africa) Keryn Jordan Most goals in a season for the club with 22.
- (Zimbabwe) Innocent Chikoya Most games in a single season with 43
- (Zimbabwe) Gilbert Mushangazhike Zimbabwean international striker.
- (Zimbabwe) Bruce Grobbelaar Zimbabwean international goalkeeper, coach 2004–05.
- (South Africa) Scampy Bissessor South African International Center-Forward, Top Goal Scorer of 1975
- (South Africa) George Koumantarakis South African internationalist and 1995 Title winner.
- (South Africa) Neil Tovey African Cup of Nations winning Bafana Bafana captain.
- (Mozambique) Paulito Mozambican international.
- (Liberia) Anthony Tokpah Liberian international goalkeeper.
- (South Africa) Selvanathan Reddy Manning Rangers F.C Striker.
- (Republic of the Congo) Edson Minga – Congolese international

== Major honours ==
- Premiership champions 1996/97
- Osman Spice Works Cup 1985
- FPL Knockout Winners 1979, 89
- Coca-Cola Shield 1977
