= Premier Soccer League =

Soccer league administrator South Africa

- Abbreviation: PSL
- Formation: 1996; 30 years ago
- Type: Soccer League Administration and Organisation
- Legal status: Active
- Headquarters: Johannesburg, Gauteng, South Africa
- Region served: South Africa
- Members: 32 soccer clubs
- Official language: English
- Chairman: Irvin Khoza
- Chief Executive Officer: Mato Madlala (acting)
- Main organ: Executive Committee
- Website: psl.co.za

The Premier Soccer League (PSL) is the administrative body for professional soccer leagues and cups in South Africa. It is based in Johannesburg, and was founded in 1996 following an agreement between the National Soccer League and the remnants of the National Professional Soccer League (NPSL).

Affiliated to the South African Football Association (SAFA), the PSL organises the country's top two professional divisions in the South African Premiership and the National First Division, and knockout cup competitions in the Nedbank Cup and the MTN 8. Teams that are relegated from the National First Division compete in the SAFA Second Division. They also organise a reserve youth league; the PSL Reserve League, also known as the DStv Diski Challenge.

== Organisation ==
The Premier Soccer League sell the naming rights of their competitions to a title sponsor.

They had previously organised the Charity Cup, a one-day, four team, season-opening cup competition, which ran from 1986 to 2010. The Baymed Cup was open to First Division sides, but the competition was terminated after a single edition in 2006.

== League licenses ==
Licenses to participate in the Premier Soccer League can be bought and sold on the free market. In August 2002, the PSL bought two Premiership licences from the owners of Ria Stars F.C. and Free State Stars F.C., the PSL dissolved the license to ease fixture congestion and reduce their own costs by R 400, 000 per month as each top-tier club received R 200, 000 on a monthly basis from the PSL. The two clubs were purchased for R 8 million. The two clubs had differing fates, Ria Stars never appeared again whilst Free State Stars bought the league license from Maholosiane F.C., a team participating in the National First Division in the 2002–03 season and earned promotion to the top tier in the 2003–04 season.

== Structure ==
The PSL is the only special member of the South African Football Association. The NSL has 32 members; the 16 clubs from the Premiership and 16 clubs from the First Division who together form the Board of governors. The Board of governors is the supreme body and its functions are stated in Article 13 of the PSL constitution. The Board of governors elects the chairman and the executive committee, it is empowered to delegate management and operational functions to the executive committee. The executive committee consists of 8 elected members and the chief executive officer. The Executive is appointed for a period of four years at the quadrennial general meeting. The Executive delegates some of its operational functions to the CEO.
