= National Soccer League (South Africa) =

- Founded: 1985
- Folded: 1995
- Country: South Africa
- Most championships: Kaizer Chiefs, Mamelodi Sundowns (3 titles each)

The National Soccer League (NSL) was a South African football league established in 1985 as a response to boardroom disagreements in the non-racial NPSL. The NPSL had been established in 1978 after a merger between the white NFL and the previous racial black NPSL. A portion of the NPSL continued under its own name, and later merged with the NSL to form today's Premier Soccer League (PSL).

The NSL faced accusations of endemic bribery and corruption in its ranks.

== History ==
=== Champions ===
Year	Winner	Runner-up	Third-place
1985	Bush Bucks	Rangers Johannesburg	Bloemfontein Celtic
1986	Rangers Johannesburg	Bush Bucks	Amazulu
1987	Jomo Cosmos	Kaizer Chiefs	Mamelodi Sundowns
1988	Mamelodi Sundowns	Jomo Cosmos	Arcadia
1989	Kaizer Chiefs	Orlando Pirates	Hellenic FC
1990	Mamelodi Sundowns	Kaizer Chiefs	Orlando Pirates
1991	Kaizer Chiefs	Sundowns	Fairway Stars
1992	Kaizer Chiefs	Hellenic FC	Wits University
1993	Mamelodi Sundowns	Moroka Swallows	AmaZulu
1994	Orlando Pirates	Cape Town Spurs	Umtata Bucks
1995	Cape Town Spurs	Sundowns	Orlando Pirates

=== Most titles ===
Team	Titles	Years
Mamelodi Sundowns	3	1988, 1990, 1993
Kaizer Chiefs	3	1989, 1991, 1992
Bush Bucks	1	1985
Rangers Johannesburg	1	1986
Jomo Cosmos	1	1987
Orlando Pirates	1	1994
Cape Town Spurs	1	1995

=== Top goalscorers ===
Season	Player	Goals	Team
1985	(Scotland) Frank McGrellis	25	Wits University
1986	(South Africa) Thomas Hlongwane	32	Moroka Swallows
1987	(South Africa) Noel Cousins	25	Arcadia Fluoride
1988	(South Africa) Shane McGregor	19	Grinaker Rangers & Kaizer Chiefs
1989	(South Africa) Noel Cousins	21	Arcadia Fluoride & Moroka Swallows
1990	(South Africa) Bennett Masinga	20	Mamelodi Sundowns
1991	(South Africa) Fani Madida	28	Kaizer Chiefs
1992	(South Africa) George Dearnaley	20	AmaZulu
1993	(South Africa) Daniel Mudau	22	Sundowns FC
1994	(Zimbabwe) Wilfred Mugeyi	19	Umtata Bucks
1995	(South Africa) Gerald Stober	18	Hellenic
