= Archie Radebe =

South African soccer player and coach

Personal information
- Date of birth: 1959
- Place of birth: South Africa
- Date of death: 7 January 2015 (aged 56)
- Position: Midfielder

Senior career*
Years	Team	Apps	(Gls)
1979–1982	Moroka Swallows		
1983–1992	AmaZulu		

Managerial career
- 2003–2005: Manzini Wanderers
- 2009: Manzini Wanderers
- 2012–2013: Hellenic
- * Club domestic league appearances and goals

Archie 'Juluka' Radebe (c. 1959 – 7 January 2015) was a South African soccer player and coach. He played for AmaZulu and the Moroka Swallows in the South African National Premier Soccer League. He later coached the Manzini Wanderers in the Swazi Premier League, and Hellenic F.C.

== Club career ==
Radebe played for Moroka Swallows Ltd. in the old National Premier Soccer League. He played in a famous Datsun Cup match against where he scored the winner in a 4–3 win over African Wanderers on 28 May 1982. Swallows advanced to the quarter finals but lost to Arcadia Shepherds 2–0.

He moved to Usuthu and later became the captain. In the inaugural National Soccer League campaign, he scored a brace in a 5–4 win over Pretoria Callie's in the 1985 JPS Cup but Usuthu were knocked out his former club with Thomas Hlongwane and. Andries Mpondo scoring in a 3– 0 loss. In 1987, AmaZulu were knocked out of the BP Top 8 losing 6–3 on aggregate with Mlungisi Ngubane scoring 5. Radebe reached the Iwisa Spectacular final but lost 3–2 to Kaizer Chiefs with a goal for Mike Mangena and a brace from Patrick Ntsoelengoe on 17 January 1987. Radebe captained AmaZulu to the Mainstay Cup in the same season. He played in the final with the likes of Samora Khulu and Neil Tovey but lost again to Chiefs by a Marks Maponyane goal in the 71st minute.

== Coaching career ==
Radebe also worked as a scout in Orange Farm as a technical director with former Kaizer Chiefs midfielder and founding member Thomas Johnson and discovered Lebogang Mokoena, Gift Leremi and Sifiso Myeni in 1998 as a 9 year old. He later coached Manzini Wanderers and was the last coach to win silverware after winning the Swazi Charity Cup in August 2005, he coached the Weslians in 2009. He later coached MTN First Division club, Hellenic.

== Death ==
Radebe died at the Helen Joseph Hospital in Auckland Park, Johannesburg hospital on 7 January 2015, after being in hospital for two months at the age of 56.
