= Mike Mangena =

South African soccer player

Personal information
- Date of birth: 1958 (age 67–68)
- Place of birth: Soweto, South Africa
- Position: Striker

Youth career
- 1966–1967: Chiawelo United Stars

Senior career*
Years	Team	Apps	(Gls)
1978	Kaizer Chiefs B		
1978–1980	Kaizer Chiefs	27	(9)
1980	Wits University (loan)	30	(12)
1981–1984	Wits University	102	(45)
1984–1985	Watford	5	(2)
1985	Durban Bush Bucks	34	(25)
1985–1986	Mamelodi Sundowns	18	(7)
1986–1988	Moroka Swallows	55	(22)
1988–1990	Kaizer Chiefs	68	(34)
Total		339	(156)
- * Club domestic league appearances and goals

Mike "Sporo" Mangena (born 12 September 1958) is a South African former soccer player who played as a striker.

== Youth career ==
Mangena started playing soccer for Chiawelo United Stars at the age of 7.

== Kaizer Chiefs ==
Mangena was signed to the Chiefs reserves in 1978 and was promoted the same year. He moved to Wits University in 1980.

== Watford ==
He moved to Watford in 1984. He was a teammate of John Barnes and Mo Johnston under Graham Taylor.

== Durban Bush Bucks ==
He was a teammate of Mlungisi Ngubane and older brother of Neil Tovey, Mark Tovey when he was the top goal scorer in the NPSL with 25 goals under Clive Barker. He was edged by Ernest Mtawali to the 1985 Footballer of the Year award.

== Mamelodi Sundowns ==
Mangena joined Sundowns on 10 January 1986 for a record R40 000. He made his debut on 9 February 1986 in a 2-1 win over Durban Bush Bucks. Mangena was part of the squad that travelled to watch the 1986 FA Cup final in England. Sundowns played a 2--2 draw where Mangena scored a brace in a pre-match friendly against Crystal Palace reserves on 10 May 1986. Mangena was sold to Moroka Swallows on 8 June 1986.

== Kaizer Chiefs ==
He ended his short 12-year career at the age of 30 where he won the BP Top 8, JPS and Bob Save Super Bowl.

== After retirement ==
Since 1990 he has worked as a soccer analyst at SABC; and he is the owner of Harcourts Unlimited, a real estate business based in the historic Kliptown, Soweto.

In November 2018, Mangena was arrested after a drug manufacturing lab was found on a farm belonging to Mangena.

Mangena claimed he was unaware of the activities on the farm, and the case was struck off the roll in October 2019.
