= Mark Tovey =

South African soccer player

Personal information
- Full name: Mark Steven Tovey
- Date of birth: 7 May 1955 (age 71)
- Place of birth: Pretoria, South Africa
- Position: Defender

Youth career
- 1965–1971: Durban City

Senior career*
Years	Team	Apps	(Gls)
1971–1973	Durban United	41	(2)
1973–1979	Durban City	234	(15)
1980–1982	Dynamos		
1982–1983	Durban City	60	(4)
1983–1988	Durban Bush Bucks	170	(15)
1988–1991	Kaizer Chiefs	68	(7)
1991–1992	Manning Rangers	12	(1)
Total		585	(44)
- * Club domestic league appearances and goals as of 30 May 2012 ‡ National team caps and goals as of 30 May 2012

Mark Tovey (born 7 May 1955) is a retired South African footballer. His brother is former footballer Neil Tovey.

== Early life ==
He attended Northlands Primary School and Northlands Secondary School (now Northwood School) in Durban North.

== Club career ==
He played for the Durban City under 10, 12 and 14. He was signed by Durban United in 1971 at the age of 16. He moved to Durban City in 1973 where he spent six seasons there. He won the Federation Professional League and Cup double in 1978. He won the 1982 and 1983 NPSL with City during his second spell under Clive Barker. He joined Durban Bush Bucks in 1983 with Dennis Wicks. He won the inaugural National Soccer League in 1985 under Clive Barker. He was teammates with Mike Mangena and Mlungisi Ngubane, Barnett Gondwe and Daniel Ramarutsi in a team known as The Untouchables. He later won the JPS Knockout Cup in 1987 after a replay against Orlando Pirates. He was voted as the Player of the Tournament. He finally joined Chiefs in 1988 at the age of 33. Kaizer Motaung had been trying to sign Tovey since the early 70s. He won six trophies with Chiefs. During his spell, he mentored Lucas Radebe, who later played for Leeds United

== Coaching career ==
He coached Manning Rangers and saved them from relegation from the OK League.

== After retirement ==
He is still connected to sport and currently works as a partner of the southern African agency for Nike Golf distribution in Sunninghill, Johannesburg.

== Personal life ==
He is married and has three children and two grandchildren. He is the older brother of Neil Tovey.

Chilean footballer Mark Dennis González Hoffman was named after Tovey and Dennis Wicks, both former teammates of his father Raúl who played for Durban Bush Bucks. Gonzalez said that a coin was tossed to determine whose name would be used first, and it was Tovey.
