= Thomas Hlongwane =

South African soccer player

Personal information
- Date of birth: 17 March 1962
- Place of birth: Hammanskraal, South Africa
- Date of death: 14 October 2006 (aged 44)
- Place of death: Mabopane, Gauteng, South Africa
- Height: 1.78 m (5 ft 10 in)
- Position: Striker

Youth career
- Hammanskraal Shepherds

Senior career*
Years	Team	Apps	(Gls)
1979–1982	Arcadia Shepherds		
1982–1986	Moroka Swallows	136	(73)
1987–1988	Olympiacos		
1988–1989	Durban Bush Bucks		
1989–1991	Pretoria City		
- * Club domestic league appearances and goals

Thomas "Who's Fooling Who" Hlongwane (17 March 1962 – 14 October 2006) was a South African soccer player who played striker.

== Arcadia Shepherds ==
He joined the Arcs in the late 70s and became their Footballer of the Year in 1981

== Moroka Swallows ==
He joined Swallows for a record breaking R22 000 in 1982. Hlongwane scored 59 goals for the Birds between 1985 and 1986 scoring hat tricks against Durban Bush Bucks, Klerksdorp City and Orlando Pirates. He won the NSL Golden Boot in 1986, catching the eye of Olympiacos.

== After Retirement ==
By the time of his death in 2006, he was the coach at Mamelodi Sundowns development.

== Death ==
He died in his sleep at his home in Mabopane on 14 October 2006 after a long battle with leukaemia. He was buried at Akasia Cemetery in Nina Park
