= Calvin Petersen =

South African soccer player

Personal information
- Date of birth: 25 December 1961 (age 64)
- Place of birth: South Africa
- Position: Striker

Senior career*
Years	Team	Apps	(Gls)
1979–1982	Cape Town Spurs		
1982–?	Maritzburg United		
?–1984	Durban Bush Bucks		
1984–1988	Durban Bush Bucks		
1986–1987	SC Eisenstadt (loan)	6	(1)
1988–1994	Moroka Swallows		
1994	D'Alberton Callies		

International career
1992	South Africa	1	(0)

Managerial career
- 2009–2010: AmaZulu (Assistant coach)
- * Club domestic league appearances and goals

Calvin Petersen (born 25 December 1961) is a South African former soccer player who played as a striker.

Petersen was a prolific striker for Durban Bush Bucks, helping them to the 1985 NSL First Division title.
