= Samora Khulu =

South African soccer player

Personal information
- Full name: Moran Khulu
- Date of birth: 1958
- Place of birth: Madadeni, Newcastle, KwaZulu Natal
- Date of death: 6 August 2008 (aged 50)
- Position: Striker

Youth career
- 1978–1979: Newcastle Steller

Senior career*
Years	Team	Apps	(Gls)
1980–1983	African Wanderers		
1984–1986	Kaizer Chiefs	75	(42)
1987–?	AmaZulu		
- * Club domestic league appearances and goals

Moran Khulu, better known as Samora Khulu, (died 6 August 2008) was a South African football (soccer) striker who played for African Wanderers, Kaizer Chiefs and AmaZulu.

== Club career ==
Joe Frickleton discovered Khulu when he still played for African Wanderers in Durban. "I immediately spotted his potential while I was still coaching Highlands Park - and the great measure of success Chiefs achieved in the record breaking season was due to him." Khulu scored a hat trick in his first match against Wits University at Orlando Stadium. He developed a penchant of scoring at Ellis Park Stadium. Chiefs signed Khulu for a hefty R25 000 at the start of the 1984 season. He finished the season as the 1984 Footballer of the Year and the winner of the Golden Boot with 21 goals. He was the first ever South African soccer player to have a graphic every time he scored at Ellis Park. He later joined AmaZulu F.C. He scored a goal against African Wanderers in 1–0 win in the JPS Knockout Cup but they were disqualified for fielding an unregistered player.

=== Controversies ===
Khulu had a reputation for indiscipline and going AWOL often skipping training to return to his home in northern KwaZulu-Natal.

== Nickname ==
He was nicknamed "Zulu Boy" or "ZB" by Joe Frickleton and Ryder Mofokeng

== Personal life ==
Khulu is survived by his wife Monica and two children.

== Death ==
Khulu died on 6 August 2008 after a long illness, his daughter Tracey Khulu confirmed his death on Metro FM. He was buried on 10 August 2008 at Gavala Cemetery in Madadeni, Newcastle. Kaizer Motaung said "We are deeply grieved by his passing and we shall forever be thankful for his contributions to our success."
