= Nina Park =

Park in Hong Kong

如心園
- Nina Park
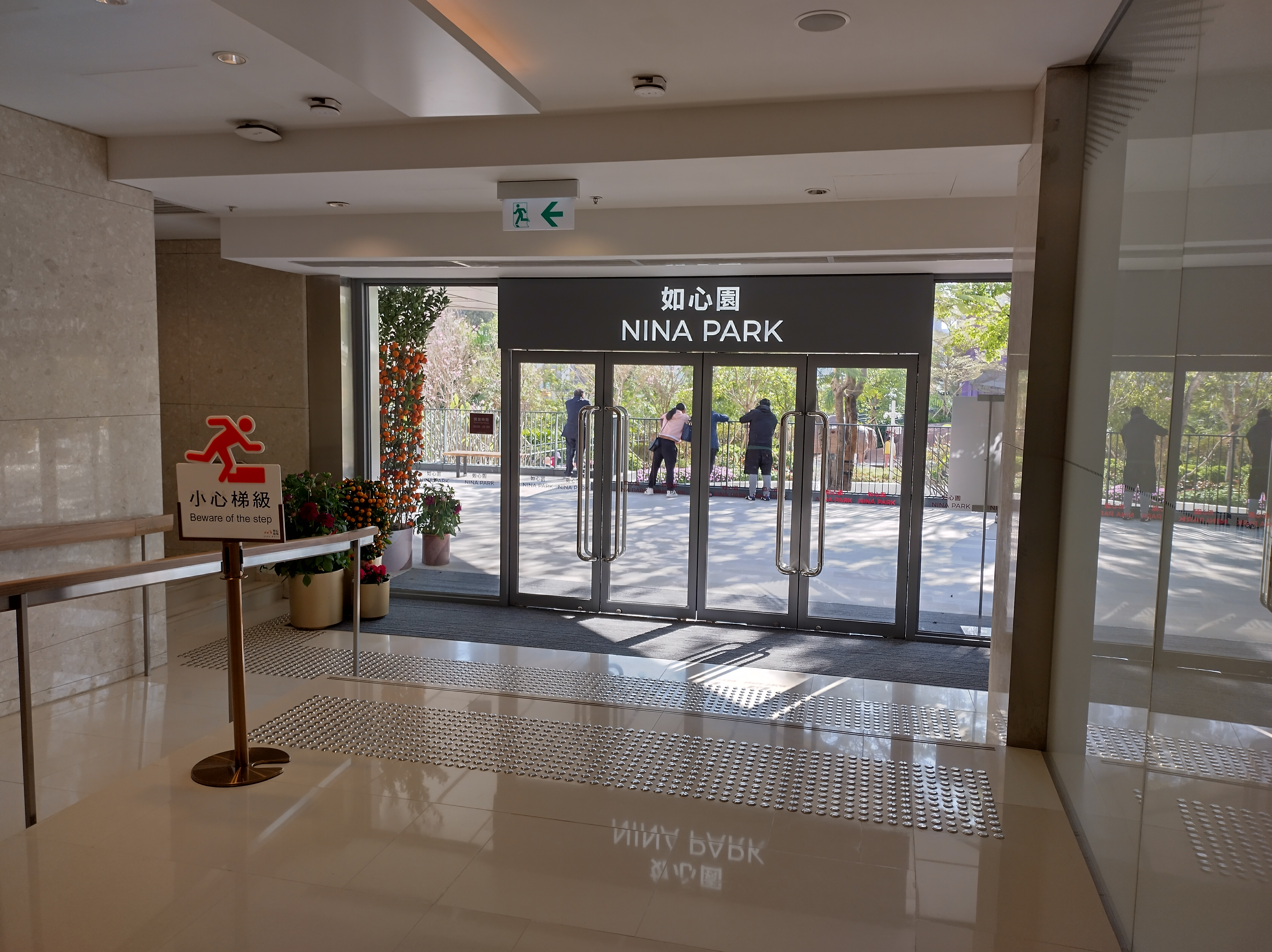
- Entrance to Nina Park
- Interactive map of 如心園
- Location: 8 Yeung Uk Road, Tsuen Wan, New Territories, Hong Kong within Nina Tower, above the Tsuen Wan (Nina Tower) Bus Terminus
- Coordinates: 22.3683°N 114.1124°E
- Area: 逾6,500 square metres (70,000 sq ft)
- Opened: 16 June 2013 (opened); 29 December 2023 (reopened)
- Operator: Chinachem
- Status: Reopened

Nina Park, formerly known as Nina Fossil Garden, is an urban park in Tsuen Wan, New Territories, Hong Kong. The park is located at 8 Yeung Uk Road within Nina Plaza, above the Tsuen Wan (Nina Plaza) Bus Terminus. Covering more than 6,500 square metres (70,000 sq ft), it houses the largest collection of petrified wood in Asia and is Hong Kong's only petrified wood park. Opened on 16 June 2013, the park originally covered approximately 7,400 square metres (80,000 sq ft). It was redeveloped beginning in 2018, and the project received an Award of Merit in the Existing Buildings Category – Commercial Projects in Design at the 2019 Hong Kong Eco-Building Awards. The first phase of the redeveloped park opened to the public on 29 December 2023.

The Nina Wang Collection comprises more than 100 petrified wood specimens collected by the late Nina Wang, former chairwoman of Chinachem. The specimens, many of which were sourced from Indonesia, date from periods ranging from the Jurassic to the Pliocene.The collection is displayed in a two-storey exhibition centre that features petrified wood specimens from around the world and includes exhibits on geology and the process of petrification.

== History ==
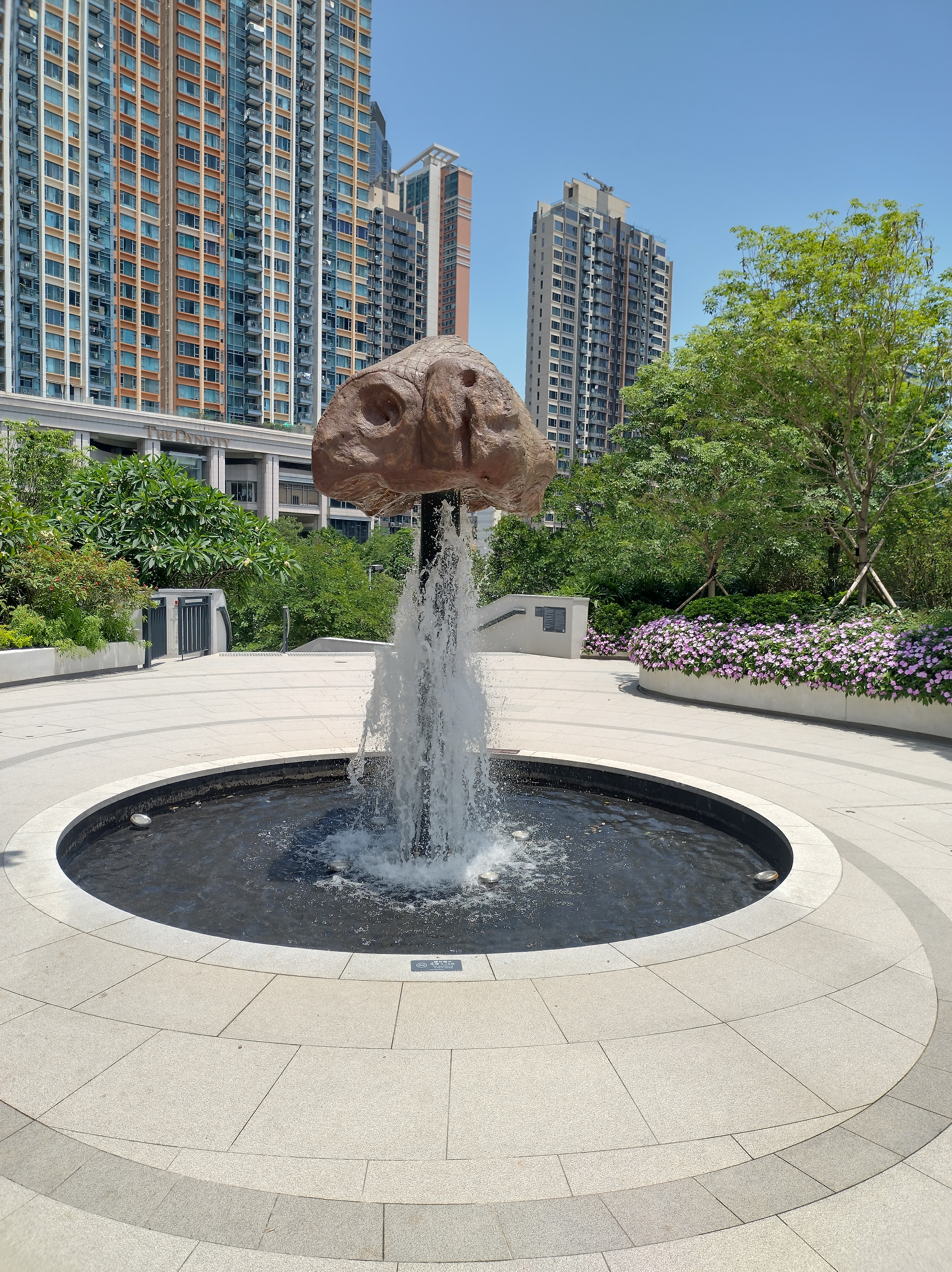
Spring Stone

Nina Fossil Garden, located above the Tsuen Wan (Nina Tower) Bus Terminus, opened on 16 June 2013. Covering approximately 7,400 square metres (80,000 sq ft), it displayed a collection of petrified wood assembled by the late Nina Wang, former chairwoman of Chinachem. In a 2018 interview with Hong Kong 01, Donald Choi, chief executive officer of Chinachem, stated that the land lease for Nina Tower did not require the provision of public open space. According to Choi, the establishment of the garden was a voluntary initiative by Chinachem, intended to attract visitors to the area and increase foot traffic to the adjacent commercial development.

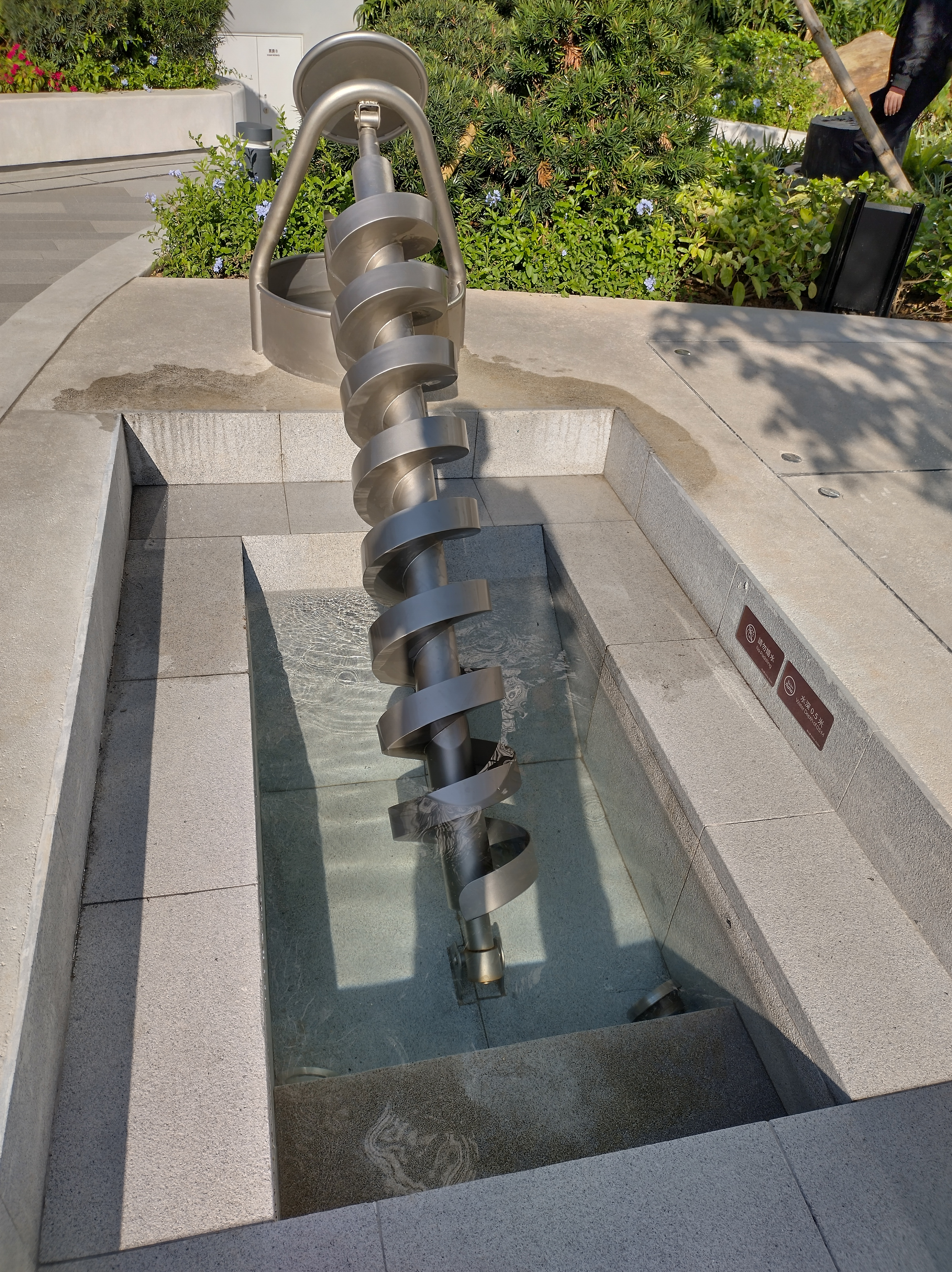
Water Carousel at Nina Park

Nina Fossil Garden underwent redevelopment in 2018. Chinachem commissioned a team of specialists to plan the project, including architect Lai-kiu Chan, geologist Lung-sang Chan of the University of Hong Kong, and former assistant director of Leisure and Cultural Services Shing-wai Chan. In 2019, the park's petrified wood specimens underwent conservation and restoration work under the direction of Li Haijun and technicians from the Jizantang Palaeontological Fossil Museum in Chaoyang, Liaoning, in response to the effects of ageing and Hong Kong's humid climate. The redevelopment project received an Award of Merit in the Existing Buildings Category – Commercial Projects in Design at the 2019 Hong Kong Green Building Awards. The first phase of the redeveloped park opened to the public on 29 December 2023. Admission is free, and the park is open daily from 10:00 a.m. to 10:00 p.m. Nina Park became the second “Playground for All” project developed by Chinachem, after Central Market. Covering more than 6,500 square metres (70,000 sq ft), the park contains the largest collection of petrified wood in Asia and remains the only petrified wood park in Hong Kong.

== Design and Facilities ==
=== Outdoor spaces ===
Chung Sum Square is located at the centre of Nina Park. The square features three timepieces known as the Heaven Clock, Earth Clock, and Human Clock. At scheduled times, the clocks take part in a mechanical display in which they operate at different speeds. The square also serves as the venue for an evening multimedia light-and-sound show. The programme begins at 7:00 p.m. and is presented five times nightly at 30-minute intervals. Elsewhere in the park is an open-air theatre with a capacity of approximately 100 people, which is used for public events and performances. To design the theatre's canopy, Chinachem organised the Nina Park Design Competition 2023. The winning entry, Shelter, was submitted by a team from the University of Hong Kong’s Faculty of Architecture. The park also contains a statue of Nina Wang. According to Donald Choi, chief executive officer of Chinachem, the statue was erected to commemorate Wang and her legacy.

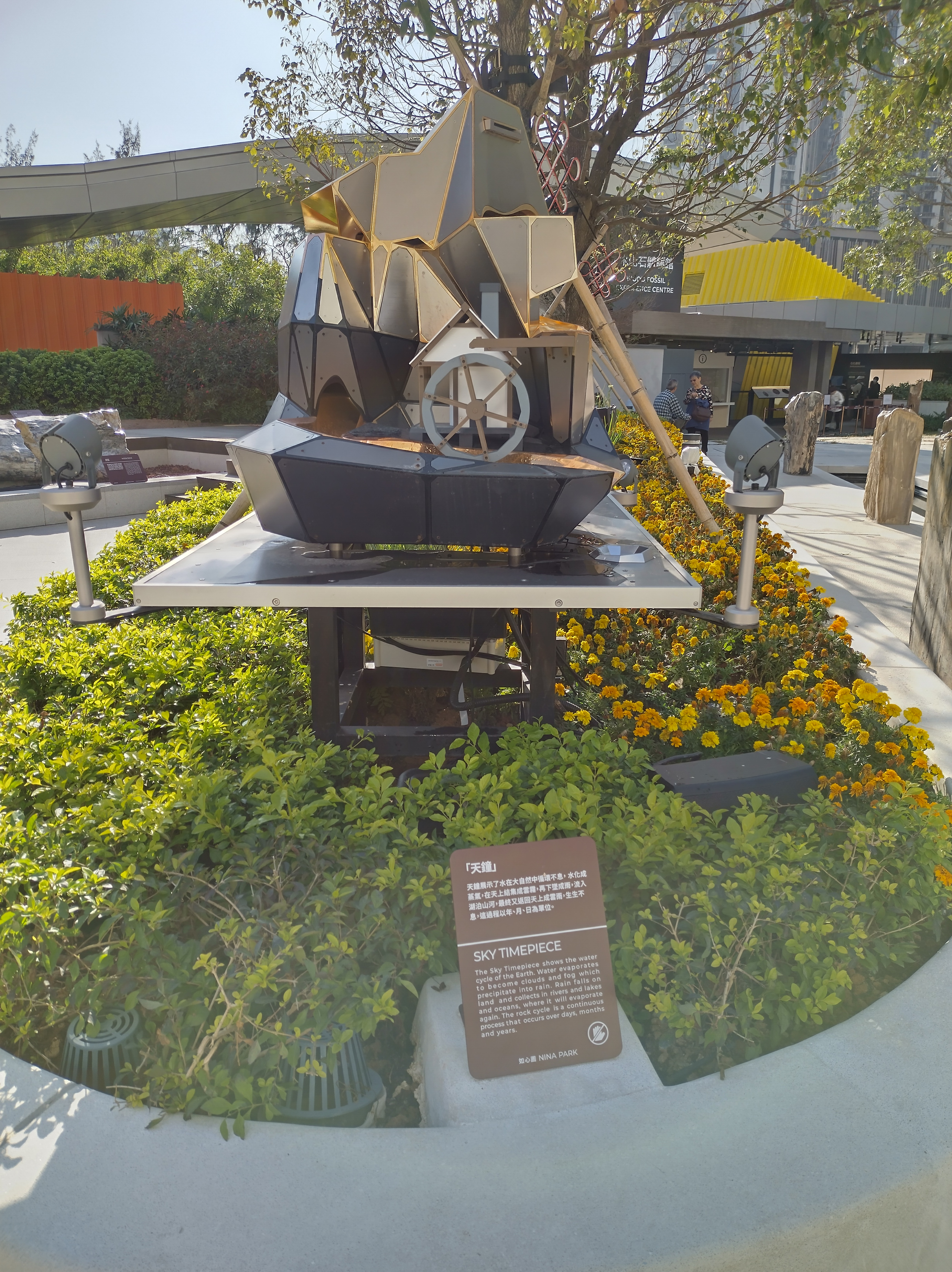
Heaven Clock

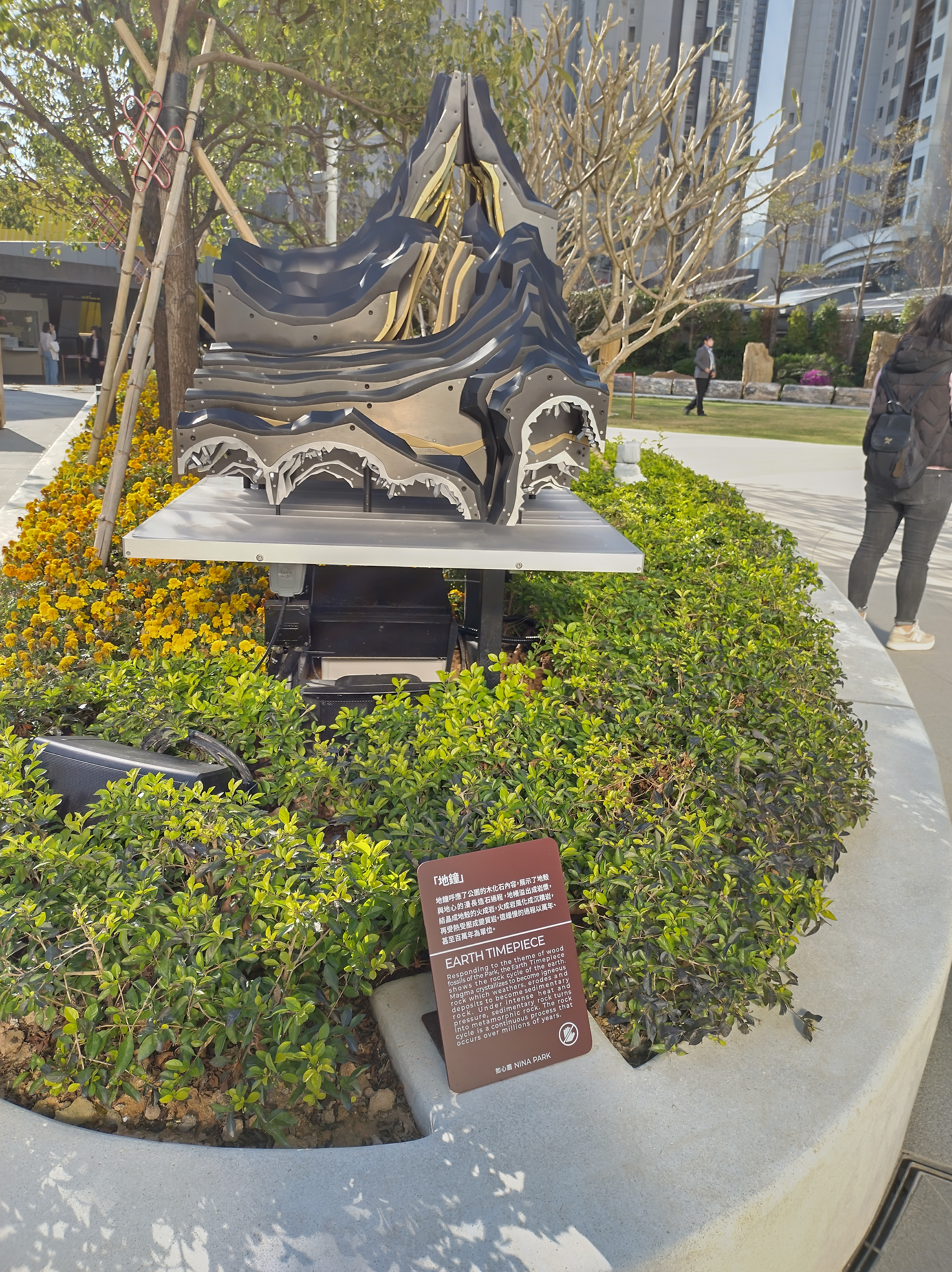
Earth Clock

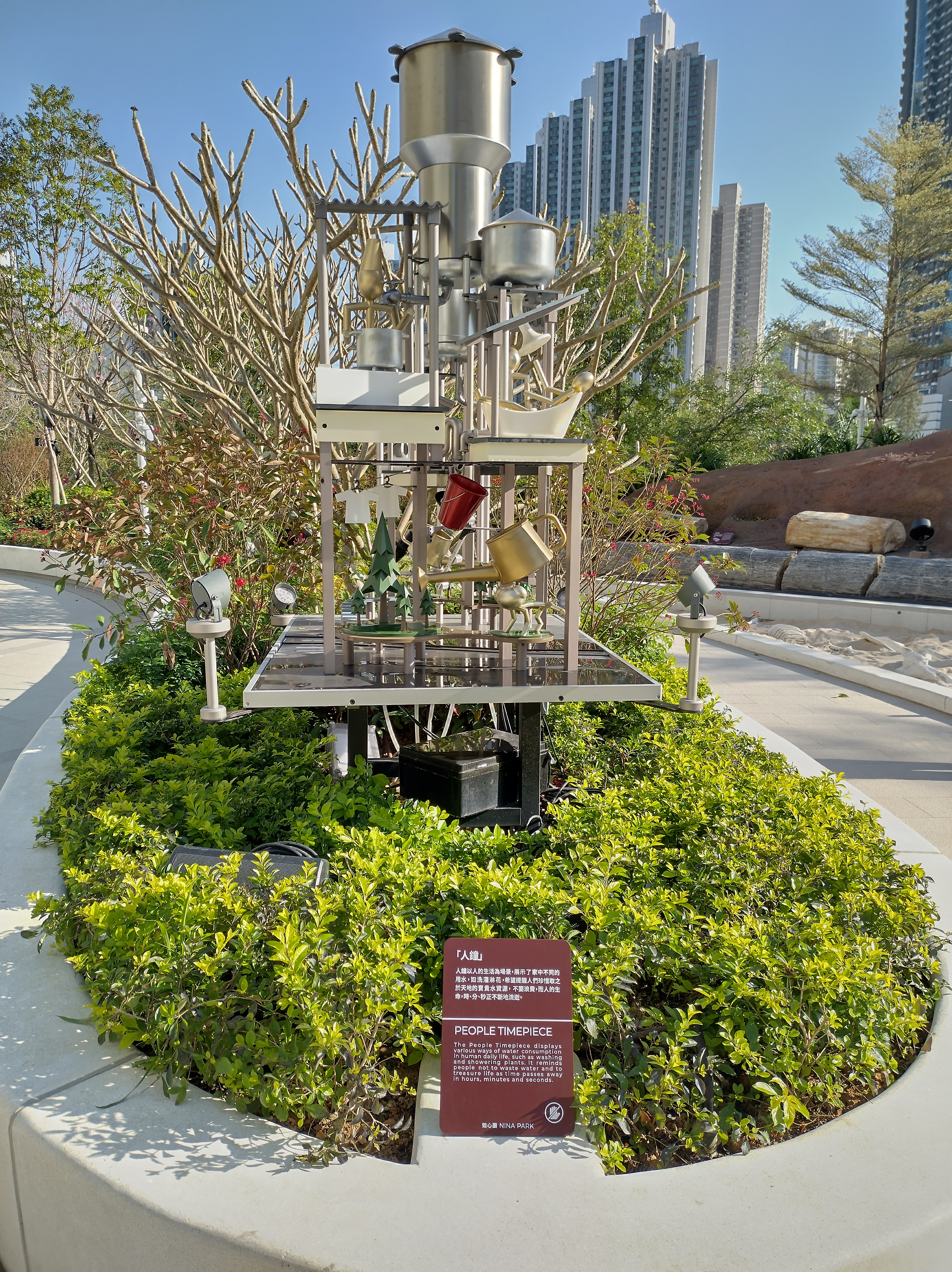
Human Clock

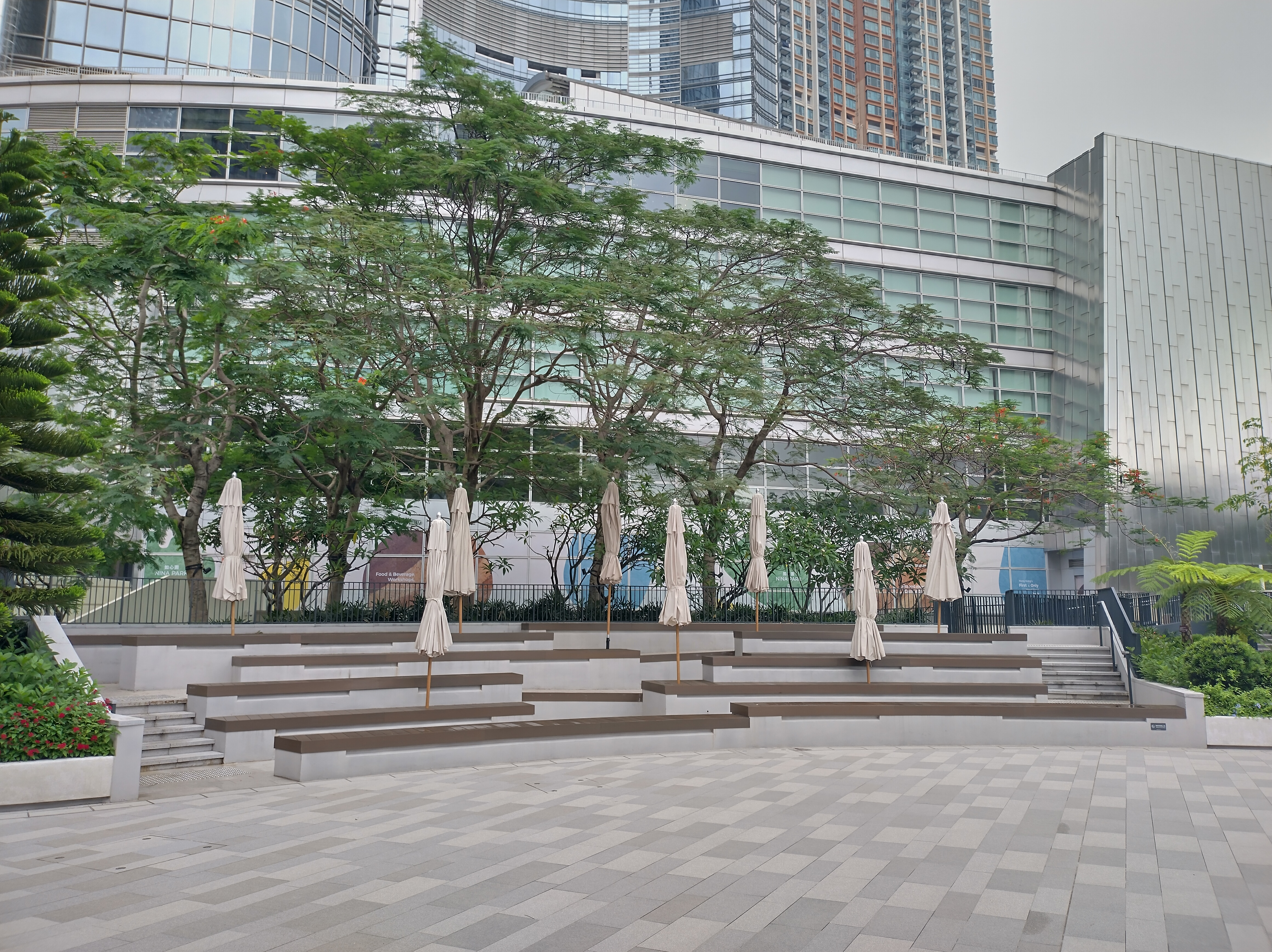
Open-air Theatre

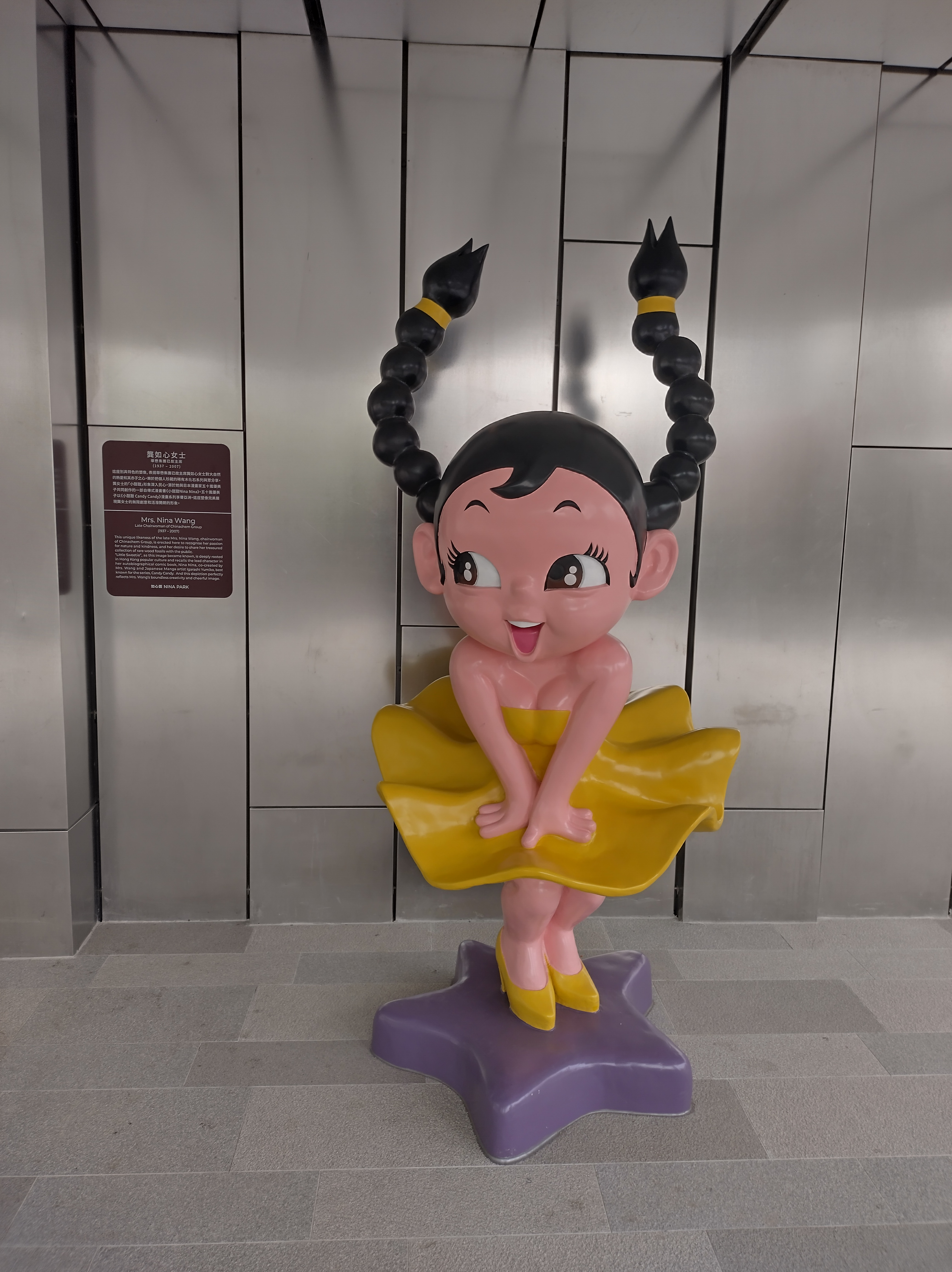
Statue of Nina Wang

The park incorporates a number of sustainable facilities. Smart benches designed in the form of birdhouses are equipped with walkable solar panels, wireless chargers, lighting sensors, and display screens providing weather information and park schedules. They also feature water-cooled radiators with fans and motion sensors that use recycled rainwater for cooling. The water circulation area is connected to the open-air theatre. Its circular underground design channels rainwater into underground storage tanks, where it is collected and reused for irrigation. The harvested rainwater is also used in the park's water features. Outdoor power-generating bicycles are housed in waterproof casings and offer eight resistance levels. They are equipped with displays showing information such as distance, speed, and duration, and allow visitors to generate electricity while charging electronic devices. Solar panels installed throughout the park are expected to generate approximately 100,000 kilowatt-hours of electricity annually, equivalent to about 26 per cent of the park's total annual electricity consumption.

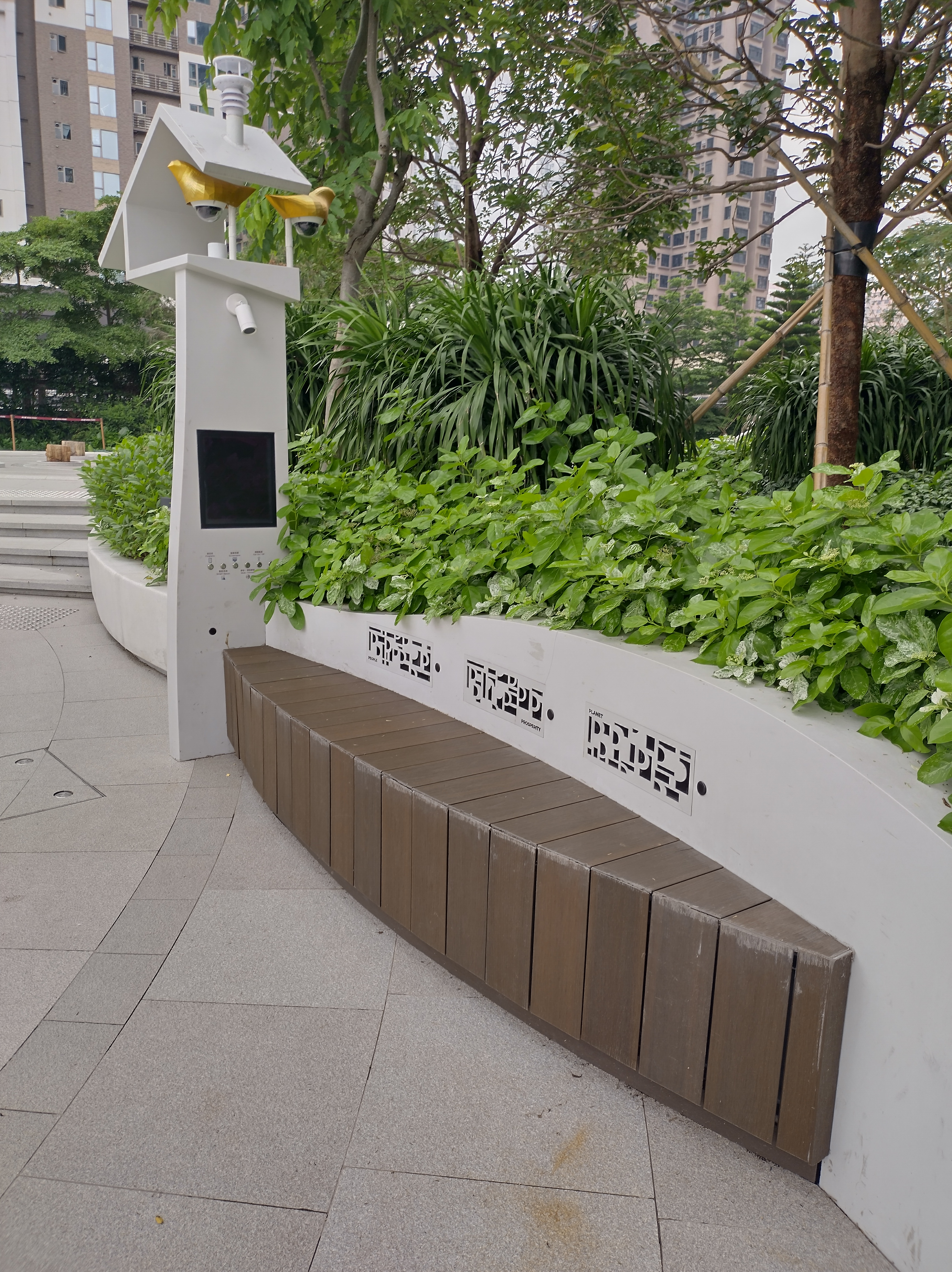
Smart Bench -{}-

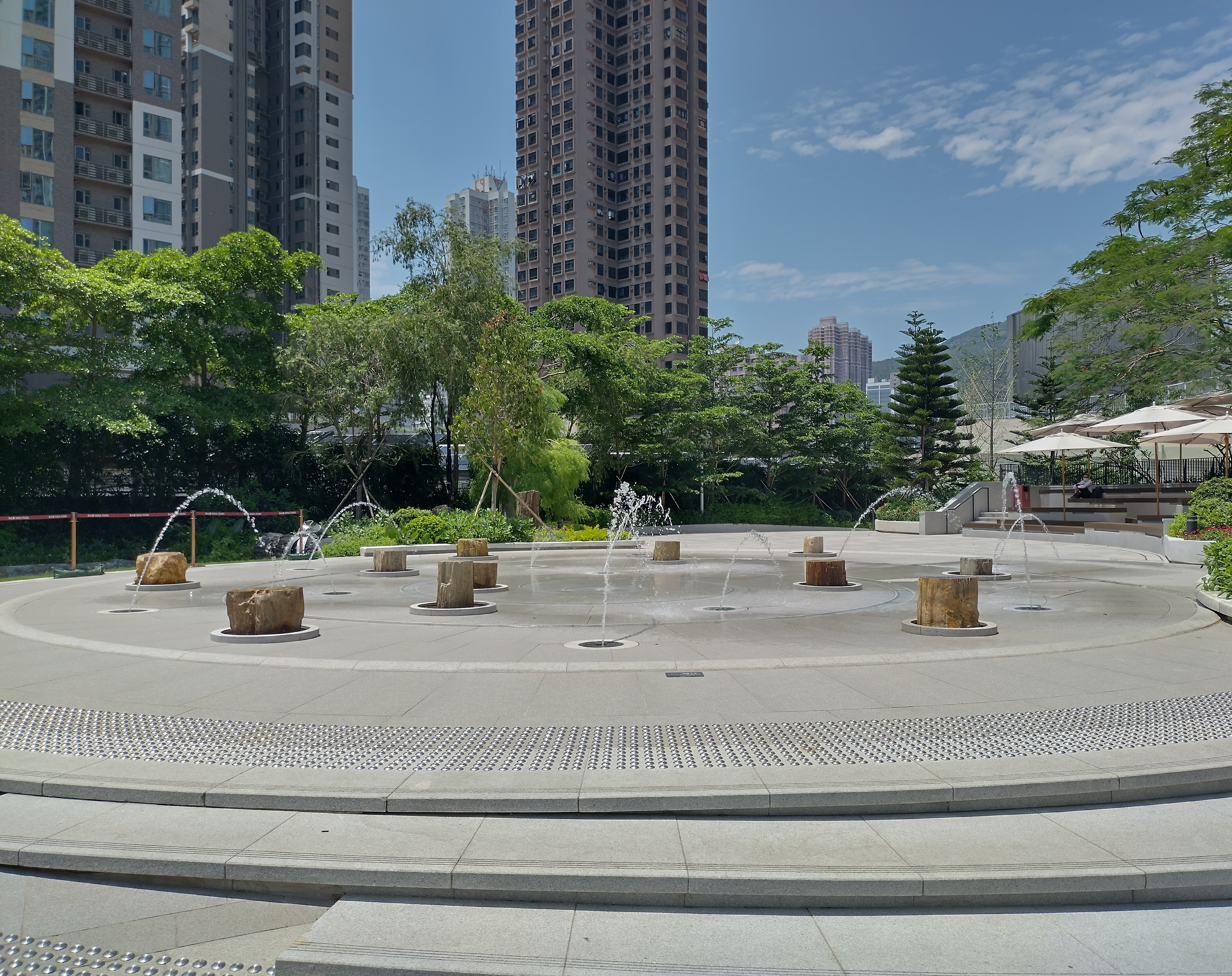
Water Circulation Area

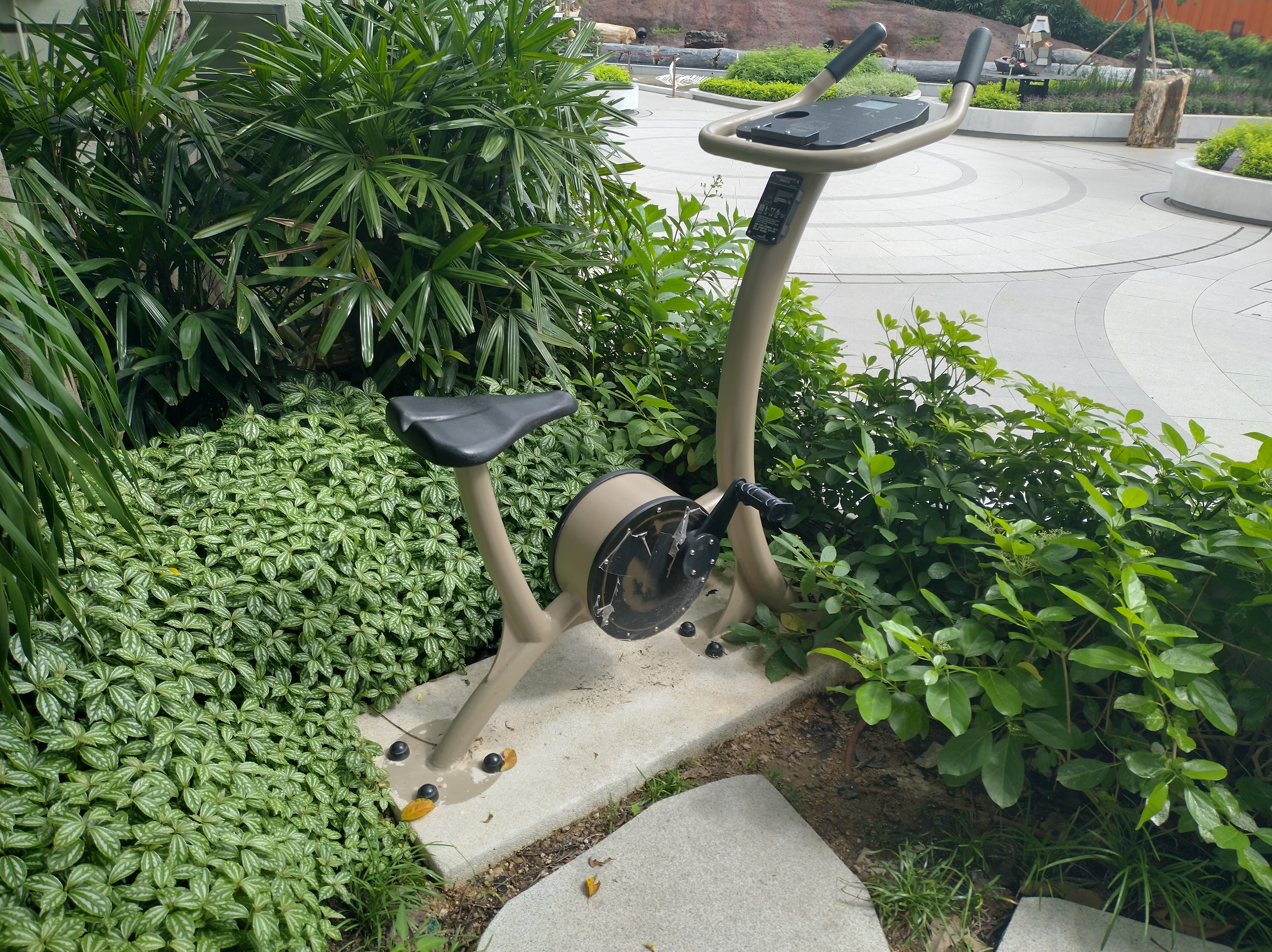
Power-generating Bicycle -{}-

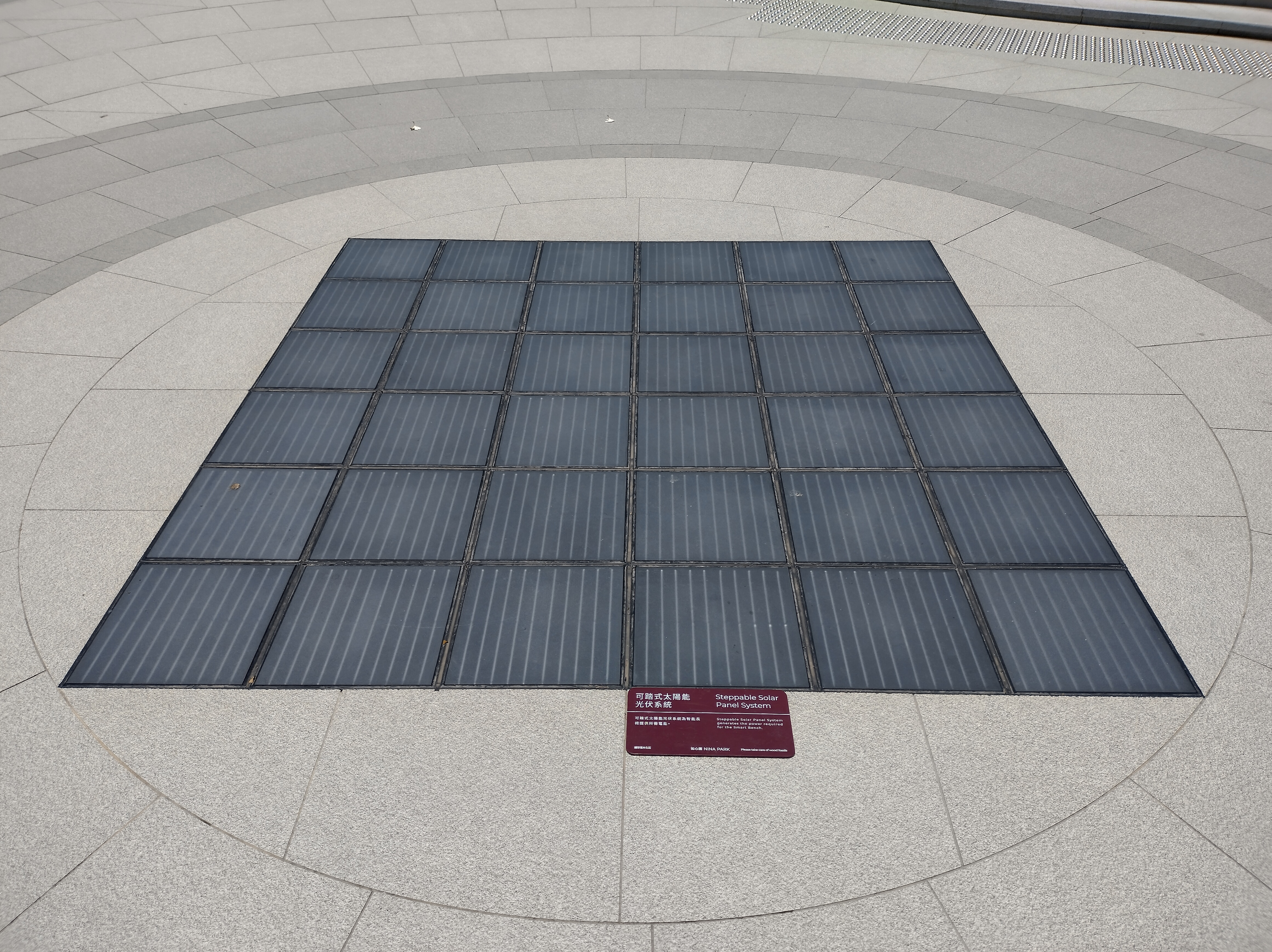
Solar Panels

=== Interior spaces ===
Petrified Wood Experience Centrex
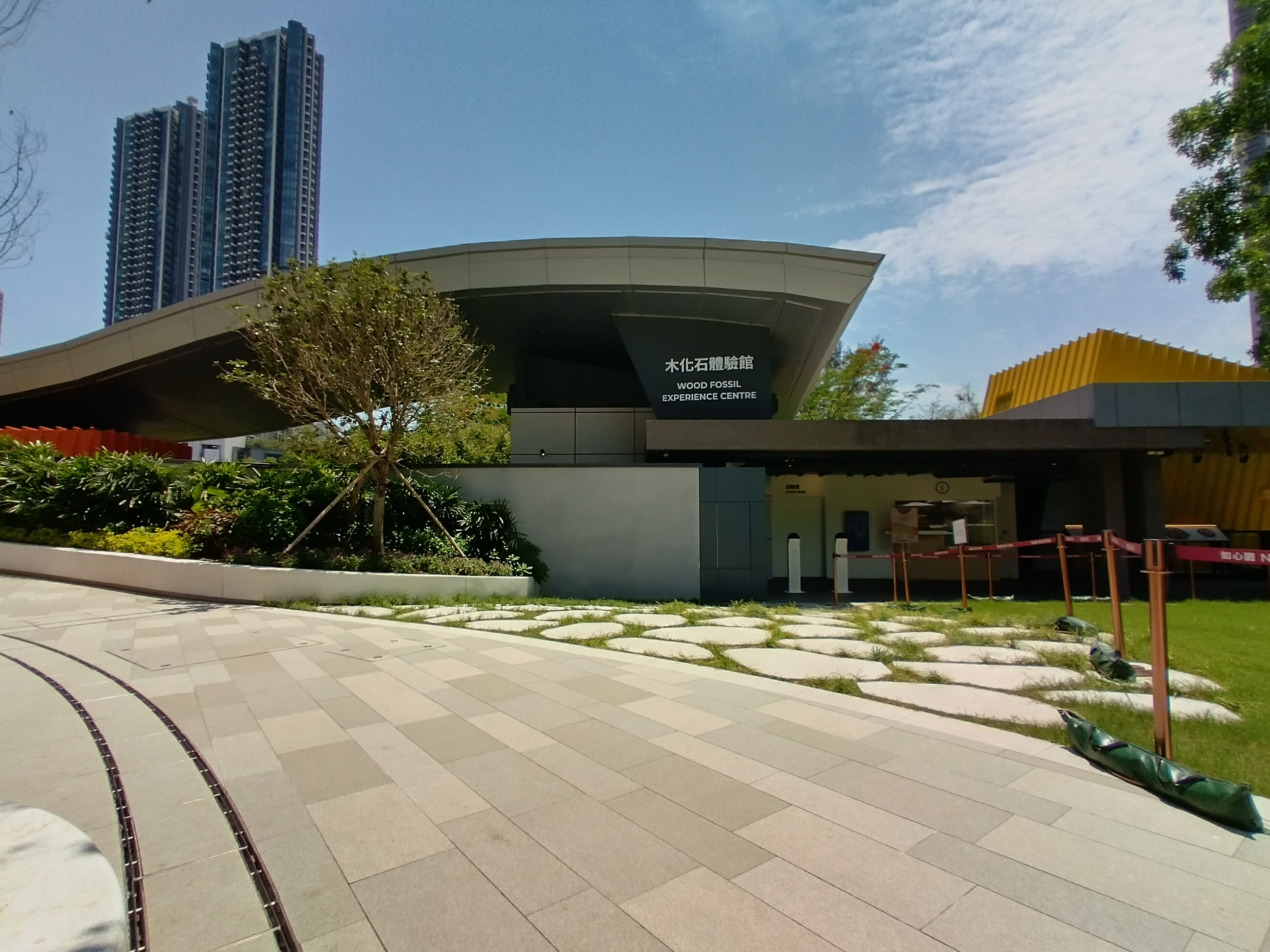
- Petrified Wood Experience Centre at Nina Park
- Established: 29 December 2023
- Location: 8 Yeung Uk Road, Tsuen Wan, New Territories, Hong Kong within Nina Tower (above the Tsuen Wan (Nina Tower) Bus Terminus)
- Coordinates: 22.3683°N 114.1124°E
- Collections: Petrified wood specimens dating from the Jurassic and Pliocene

The Petrified Wood Experience Centre is a two-storey building containing 16 themed exhibition areas and an activity room. It showcases petrified wood specimens from around the world and includes exhibits on geology and the formation of petrified wood. The building incorporates a natural ventilation system and is equipped with rooftop wind catchers to improve airflow and help regulate indoor temperatures. Outside the entrance is a “natural mural” composed of small pieces of petrified wood. The centre also features two virtual reality installations that illustrate the process of petrification. At the entrance is Petrified Wood Ode, a work by Li Haijun, while the entrance passage, known as the Eternal Corridor, contains inscriptions displayed along its walls. Exhibits within the centre include microscopic images showing the colours and patterns produced by the mineralisation of different metallic elements in petrified wood. The Petrified Wood Experience Centre is open from 10:00 a.m. to 6:00 p.m. from Tuesday to Sunday.

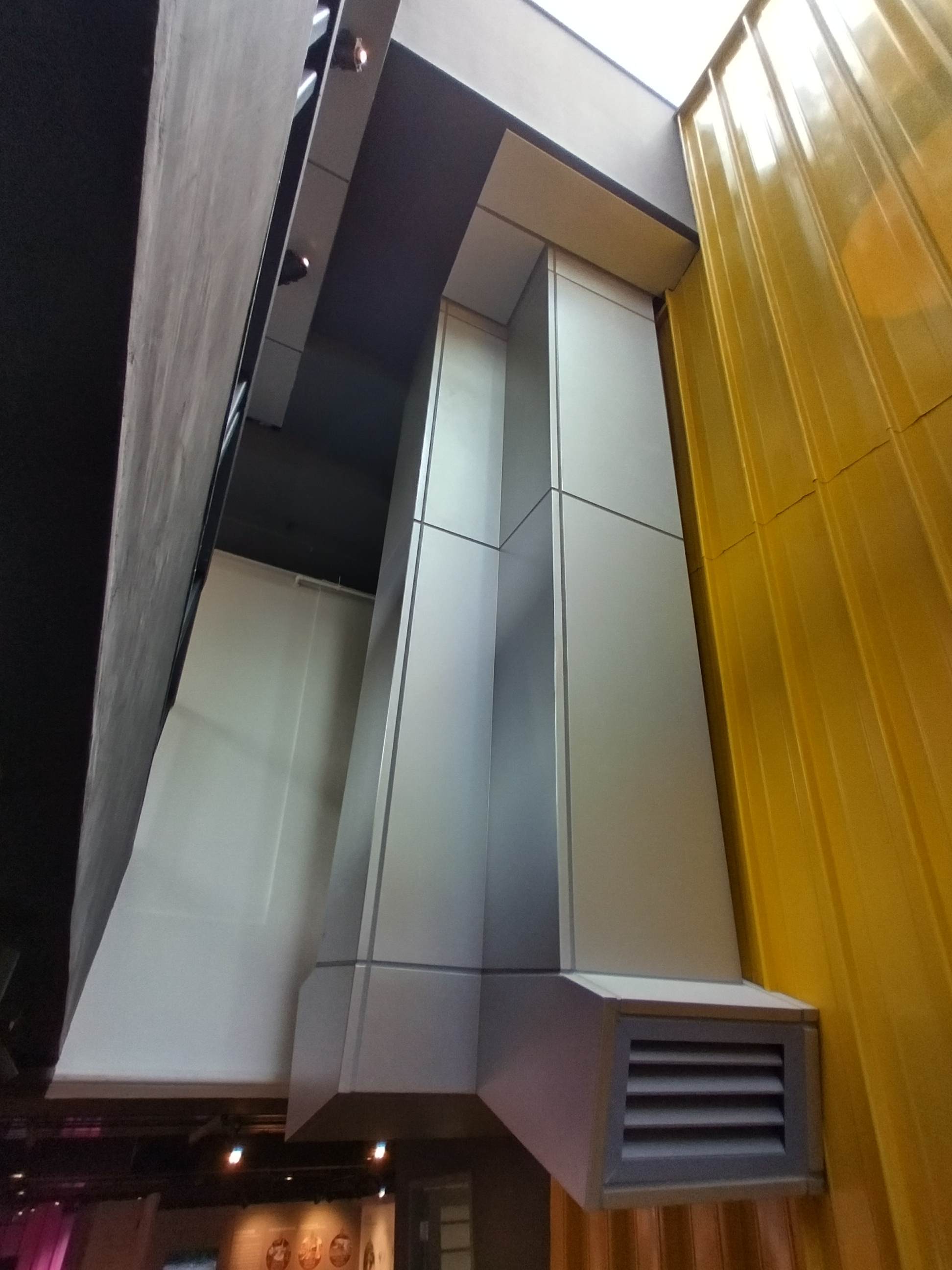
Wind Catcher

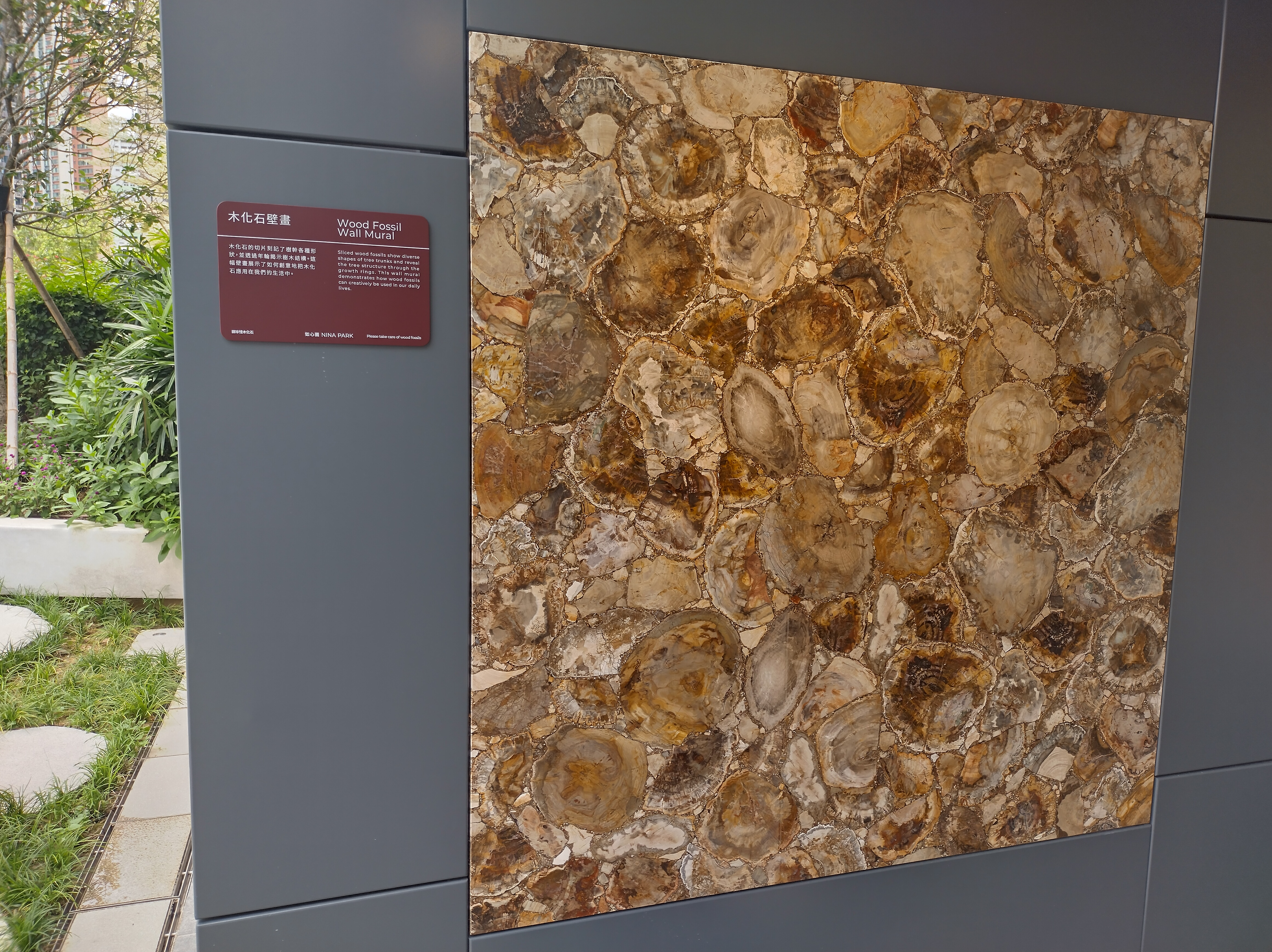
Petrified Wood Mural

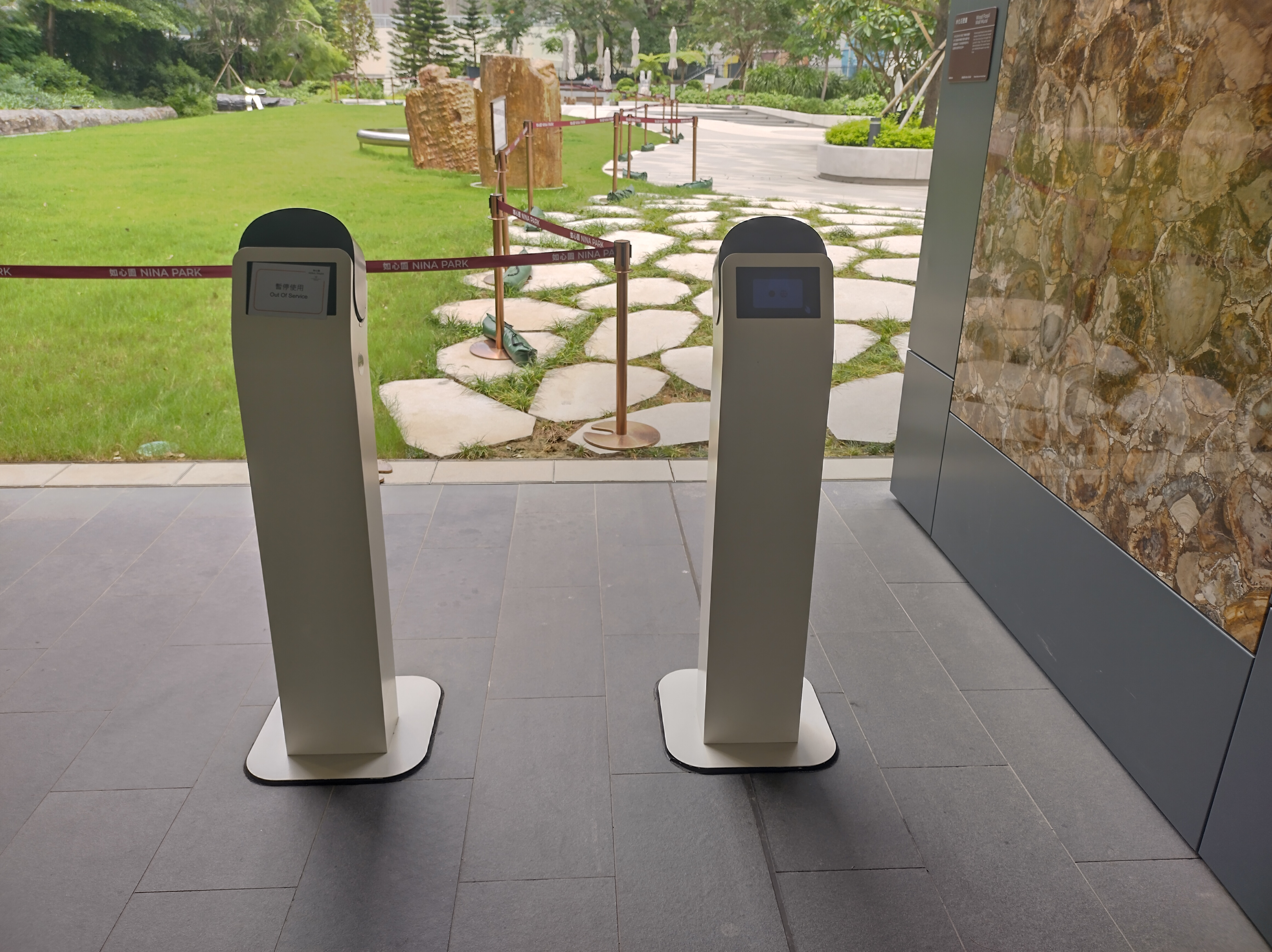
Virtual Reality Installation

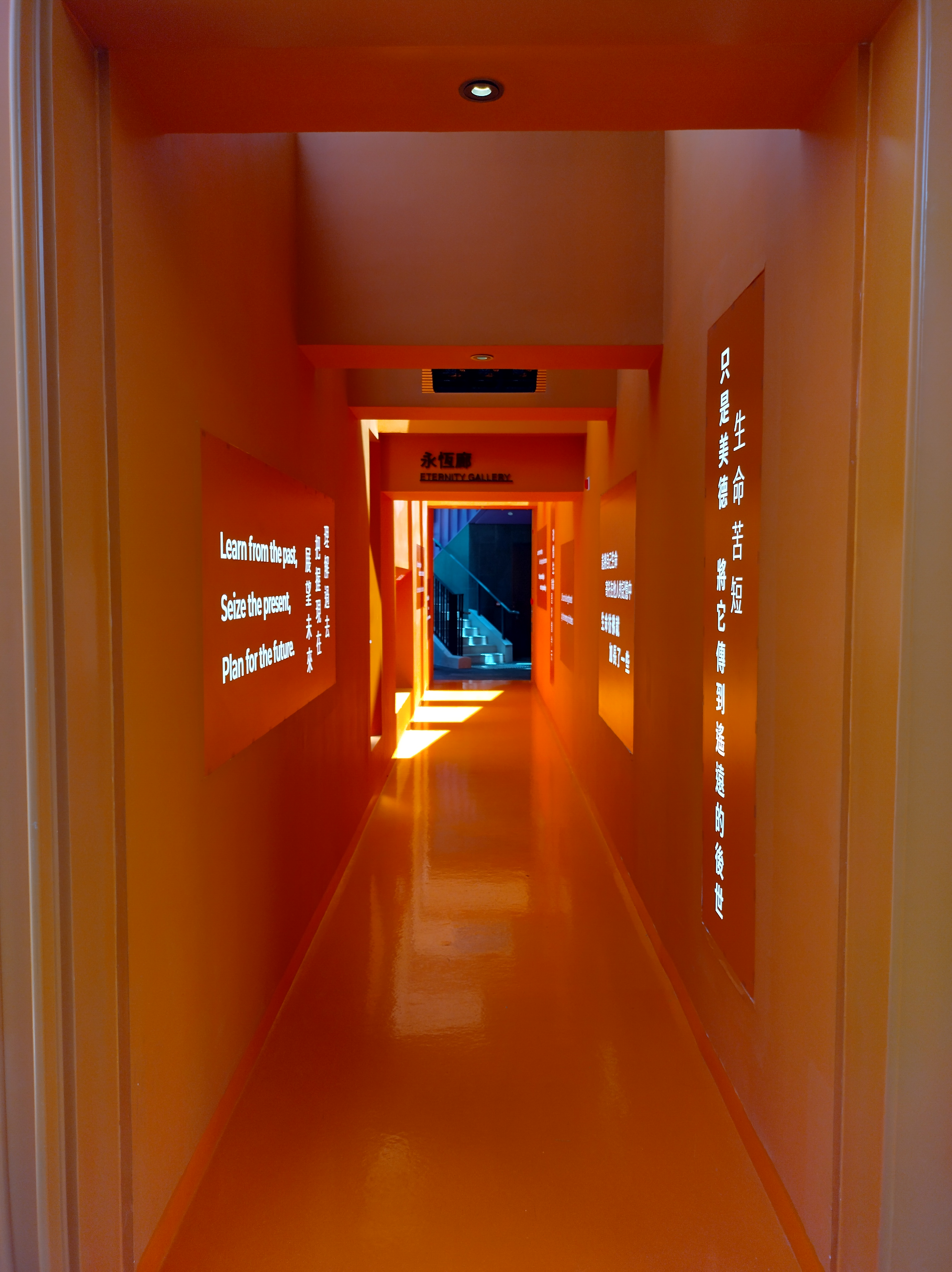
Eternal Corridor

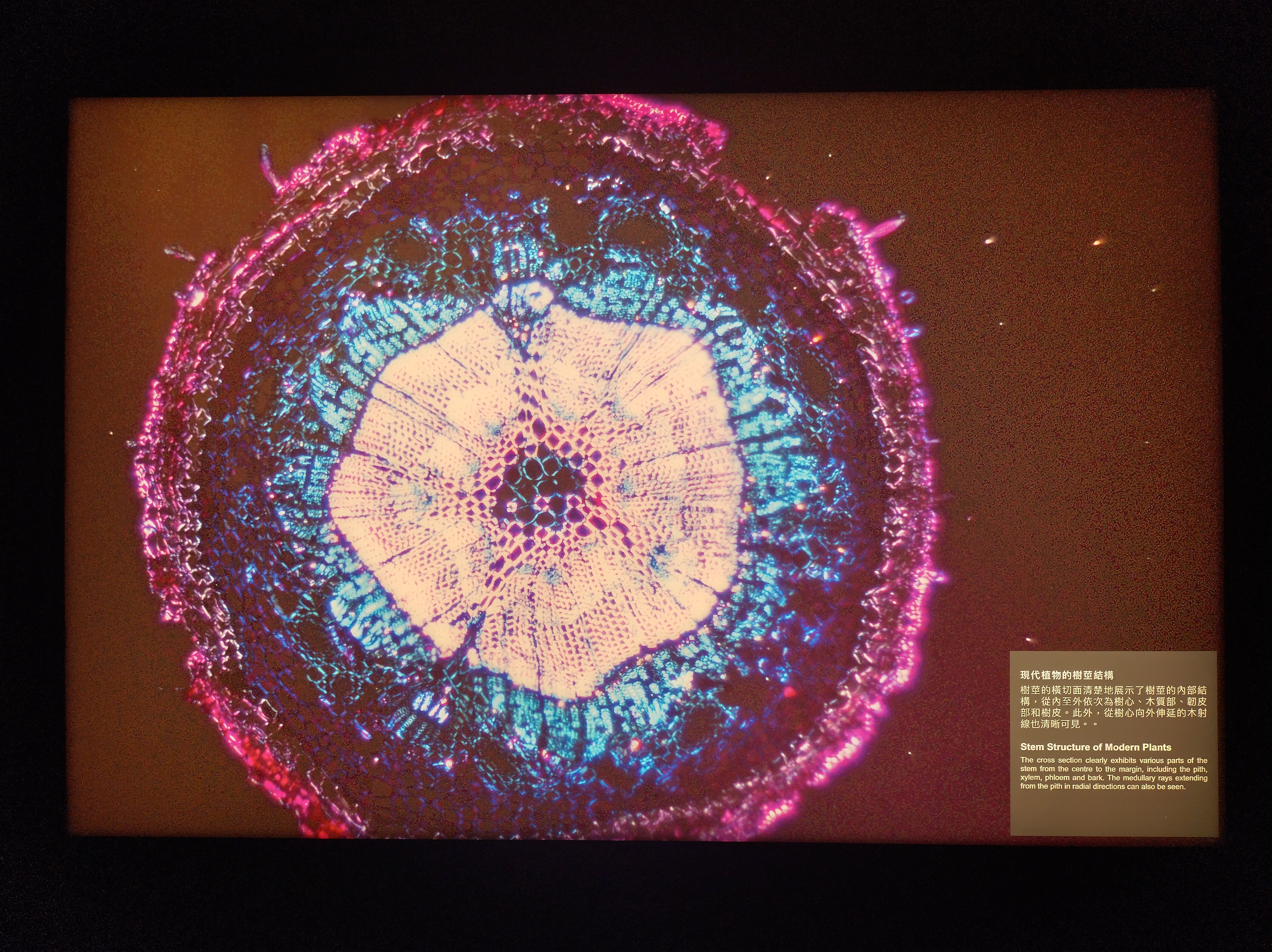
Microscopic Image of Mineralised Petrified Wood

In addition to the Petrified Wood Experience Centre, Nina Park also features a hexagonal theatre designed with reference to Hong Kong's hexagonal volcanic rock columns. The theatre is intended to provide visitors with information about the park through film presentations. However, the facility had not yet opened to the public at the time of the park's reopening.

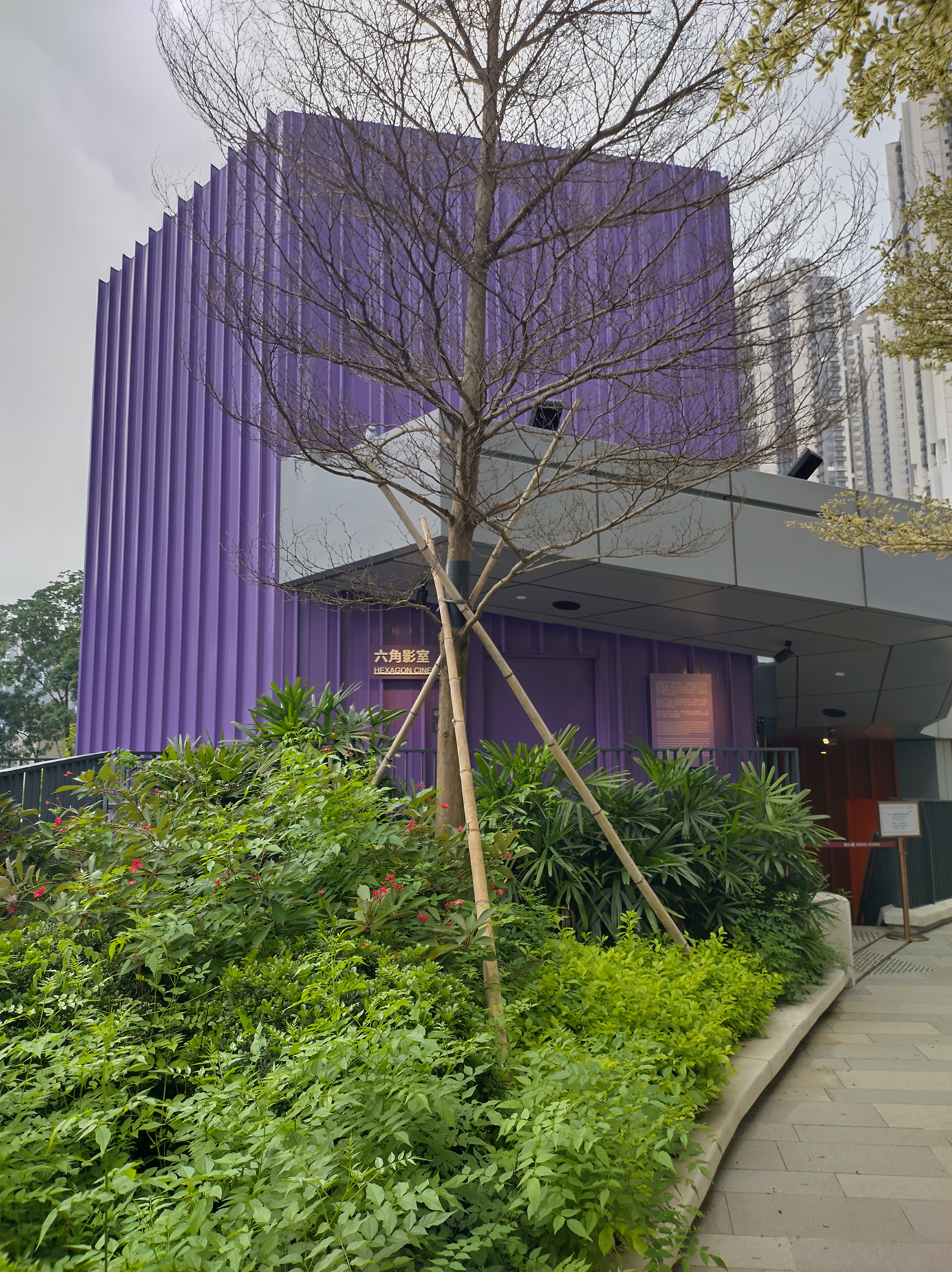
Hexagonal Theatre

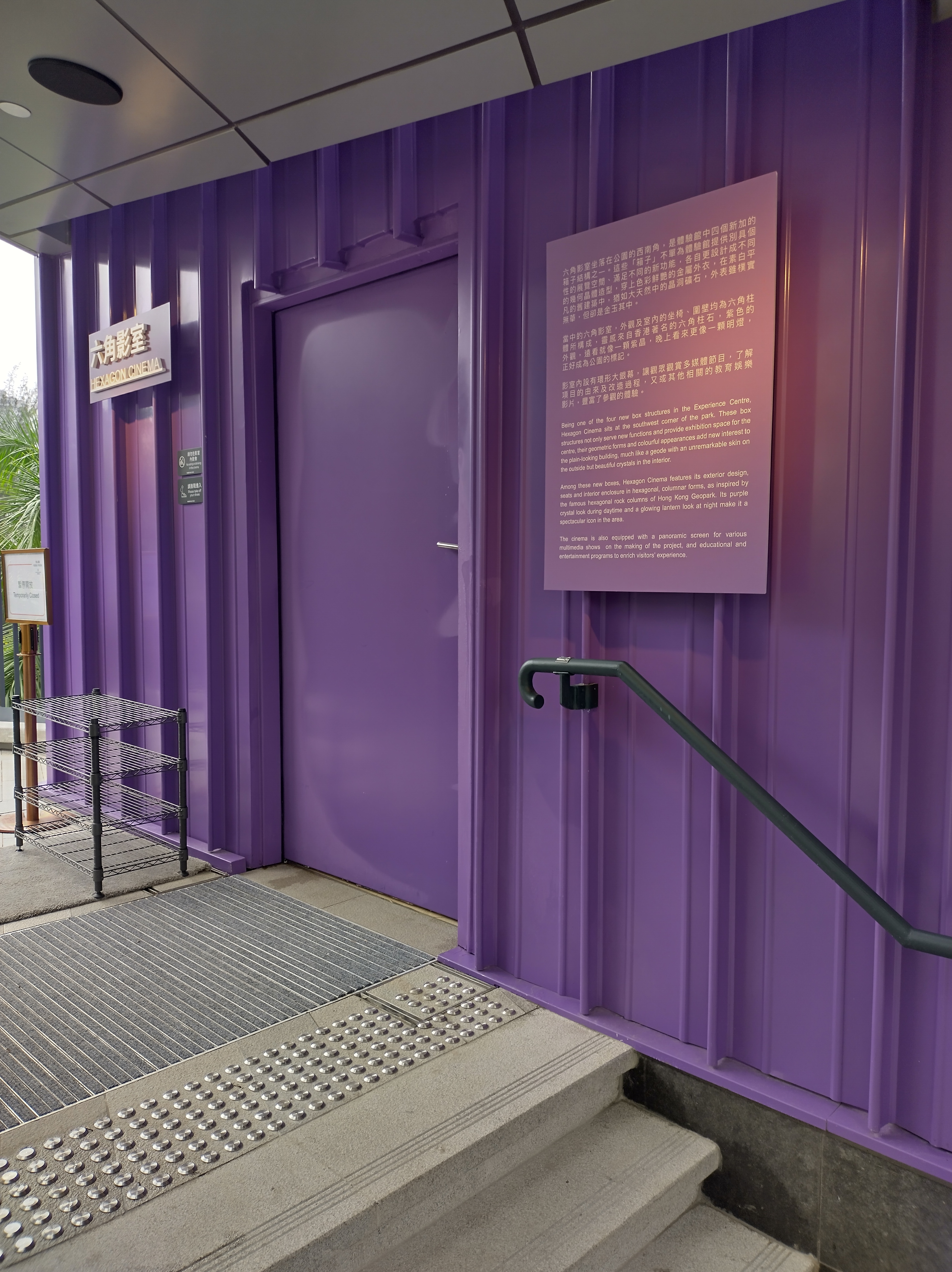
Entrance to the Hexagonal Theatre

== Petrified wood exhibits ==
Nina Park displays more than 100 petrified wood specimens collected by the late Nina Wang, former chairwoman of Chinachem. Most of the specimens originate from Indonesia and date from periods ranging from the Jurassic to the Pliocene, 2.6 million to 5.3 million years ago.

Petrified wood specimens exhibited in the park's outdoor areas include the Sun Stone, Moon Stone, and Life Milestone.

=== Sunstone and Moonstone ===
The Sun Stone is the seventh-longest petrified wood specimen in the world and the longest in Nina Park. It measures 30 metres (98 ft) in length, although another source gives a length of 27 metres (89 ft). The specimen is displayed on the Sun Stone Terrace within the park, where it forms part of a visitor seating area. The Moon Stone is the second-longest petrified wood specimen in Nina Park, measuring 25 metres (82 ft) in length. Set against the backdrop of the Volcanic Trail, it is accompanied by smoke effects as well as sound and lighting effects that recreate the eruption of Krakatoa in Indonesia at night. Its cross-section demonstrates a silicification process that took place over millions of years, preserving the original structure of the wood. A mammoth display located in front of the specimen is intended to illustrate that the Moon Stone and mammoths once coexisted during the Cenozoic.

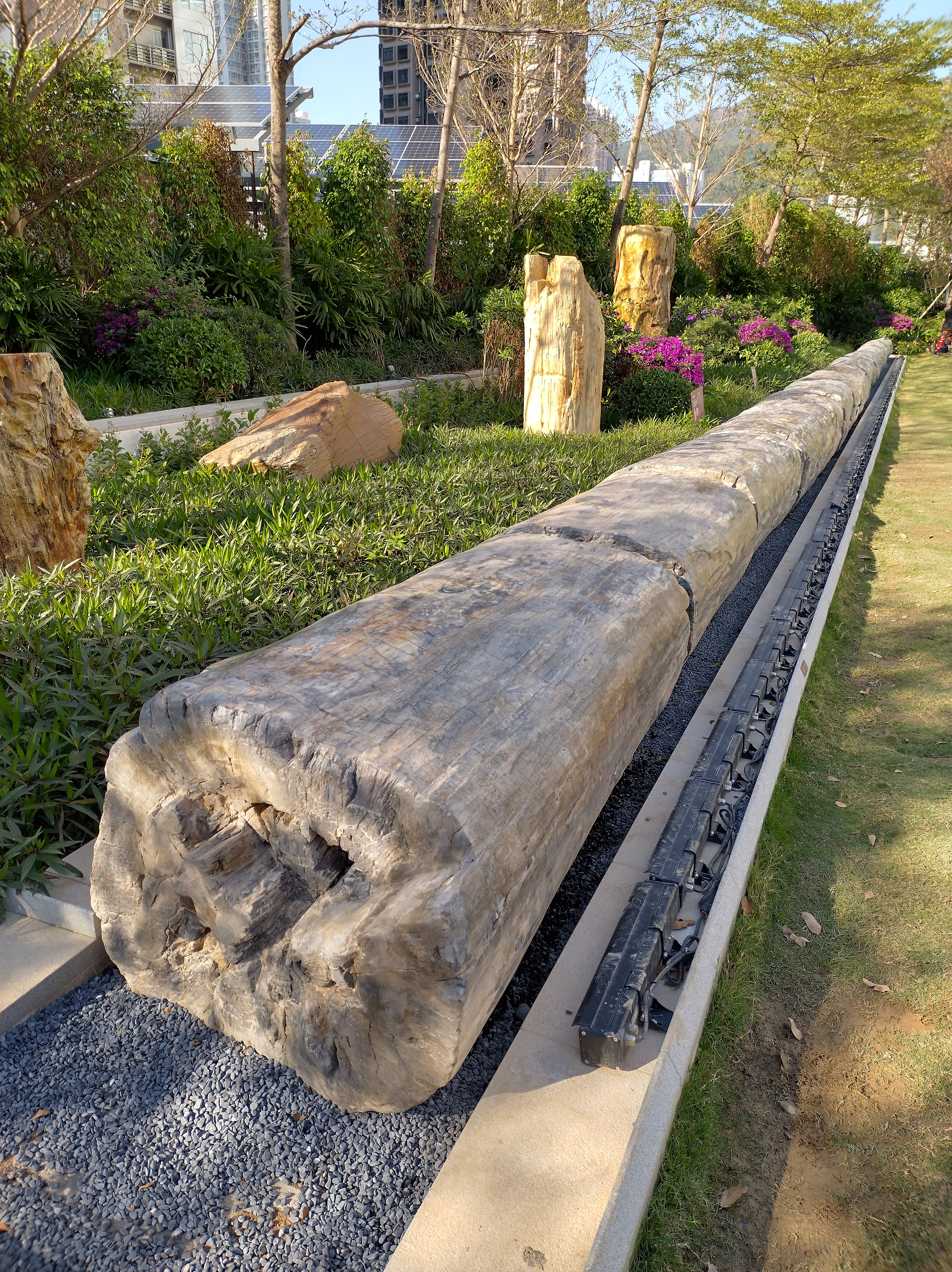
Sun Stone

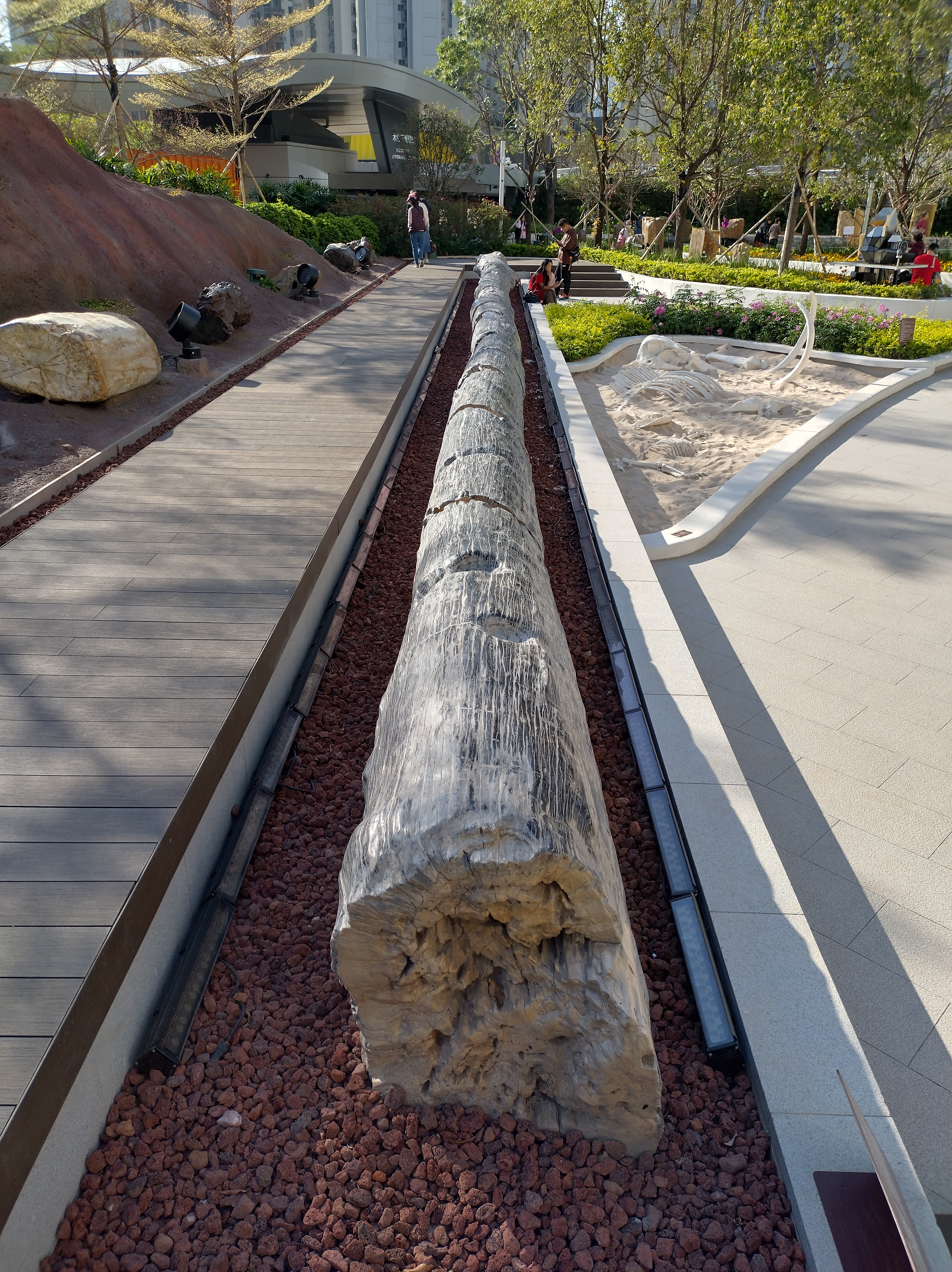
Moon Stone

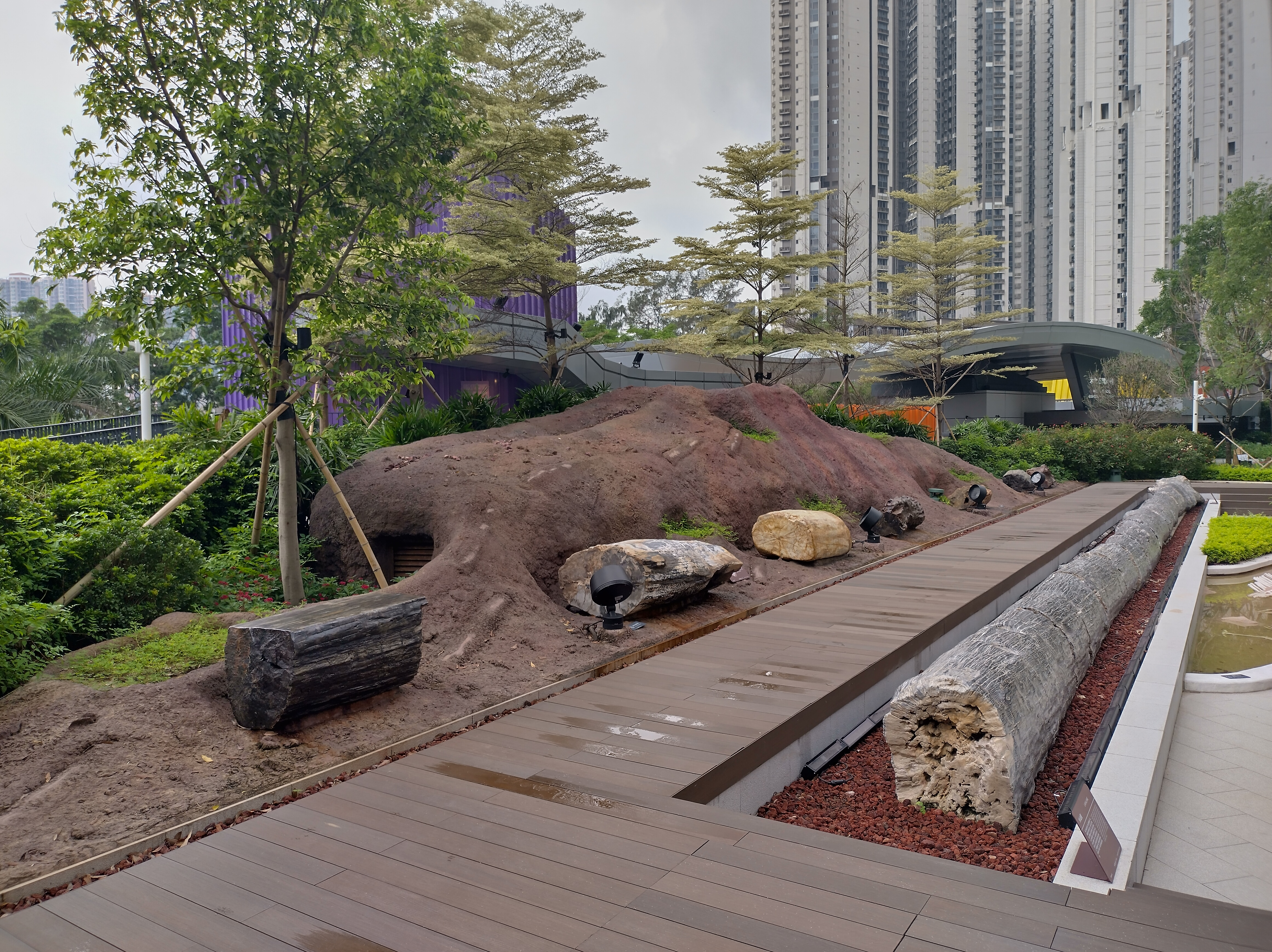
Volcanic Trail

=== Life milestones ===
As chief curator of Nina Park, Lai-kiu Chan selected six specimens from Nina Wang's petrified wood collection and collectively designated them as the “Life Milestones”, drawing a connection between petrified wood and different stages of life. The six specimens comprise the heart-shaped Nina Wang Stone; the Graduation Stone, distinguished by a metallic ribbon-like feature; the Victory Stone, which bears a raised V-shaped formation resembling a victory sign; the Daughter Stone, displayed within a giant ring; the Anniversary Stone, composed of three petrified wood specimens stacked in descending order to resemble a tiered cake; and the Reunion Stone, whose shape resembles outstretched arms. With the exception of the Reunion Stone, which has been loaned to the palaeontology exhibition gallery of the Hong Kong Science Museum until 2027, all of the Life Milestones specimens are displayed in the park's outdoor areas.

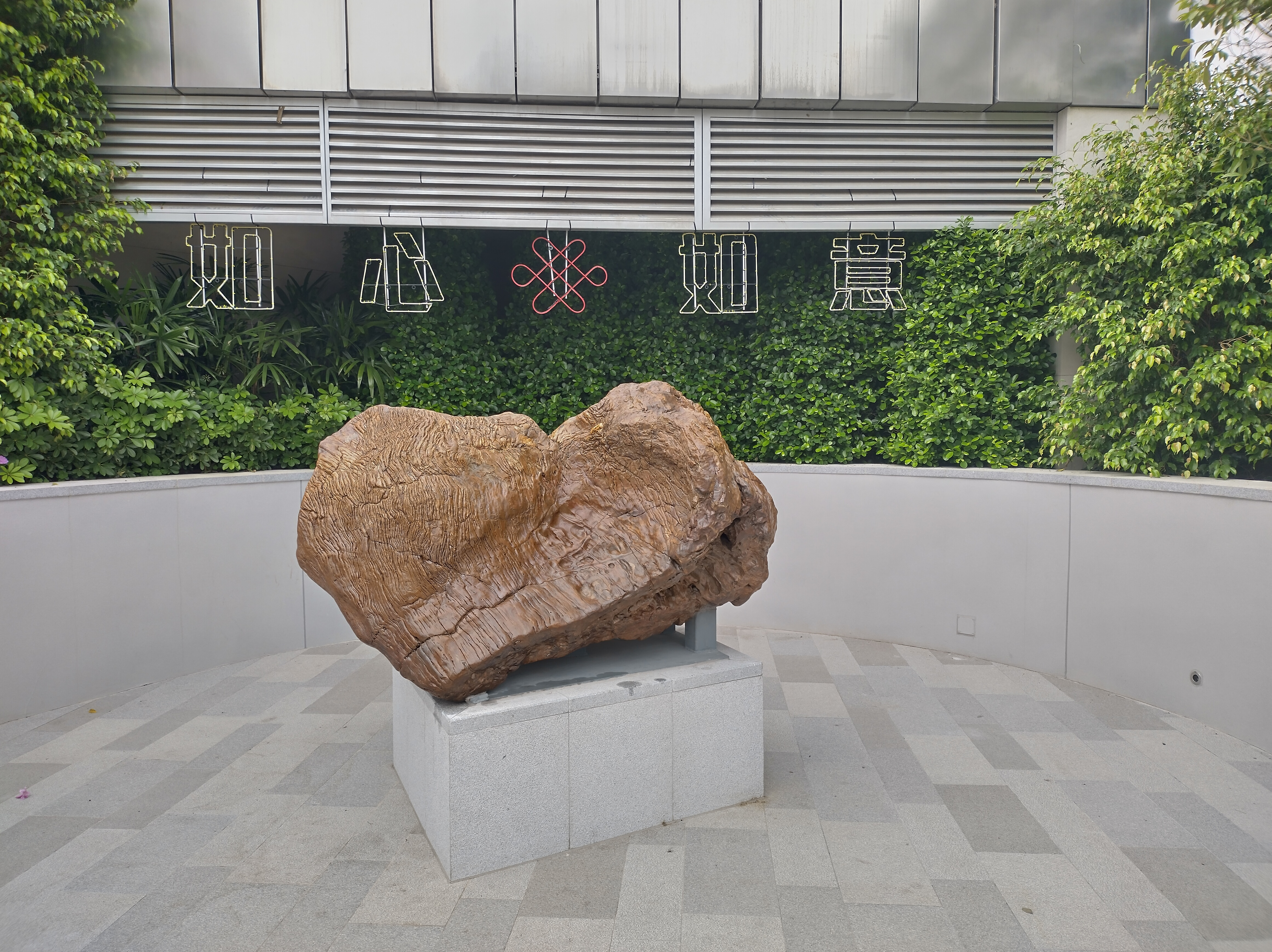
Nina Wang Stone

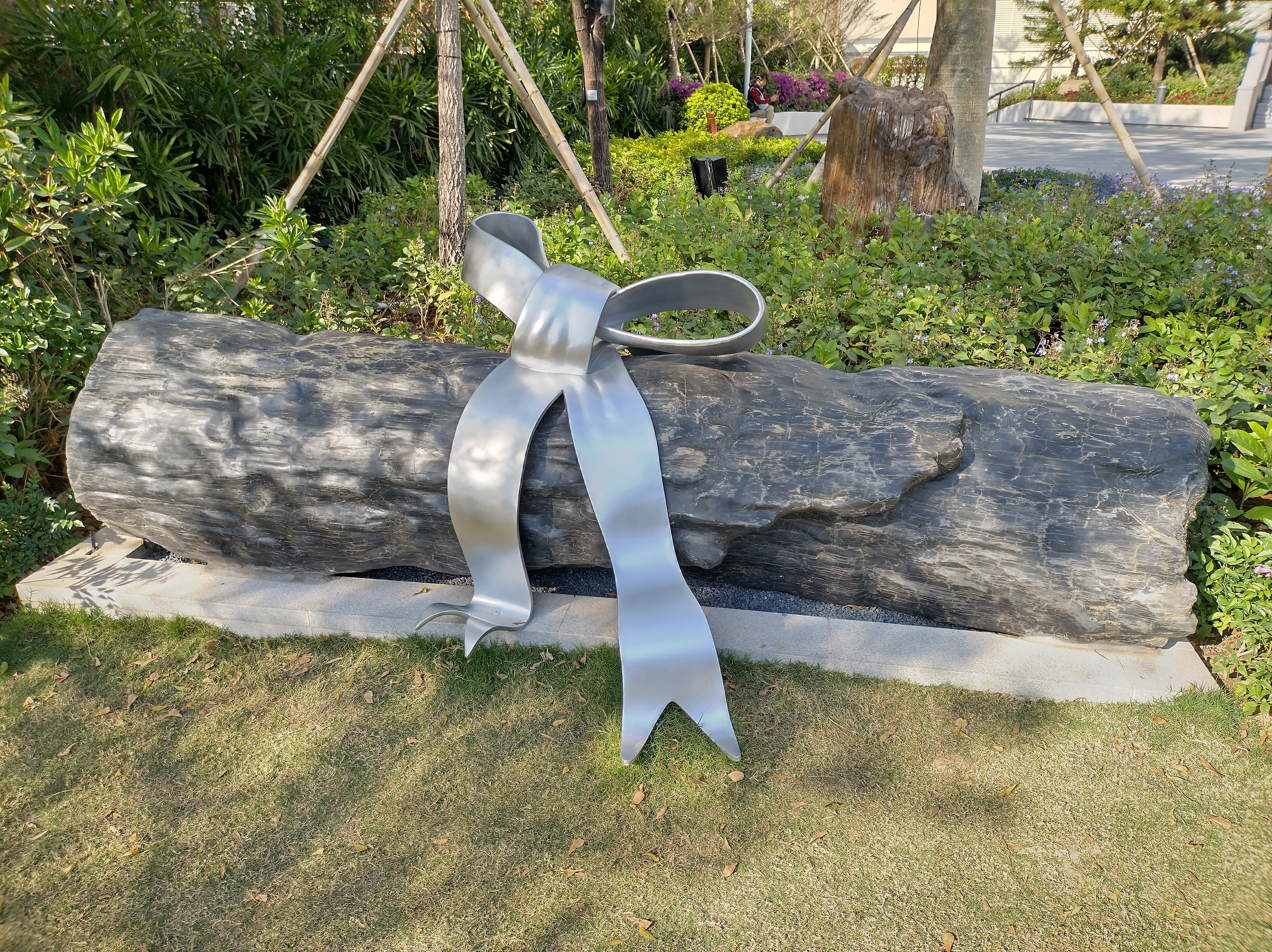
Graduation Stone

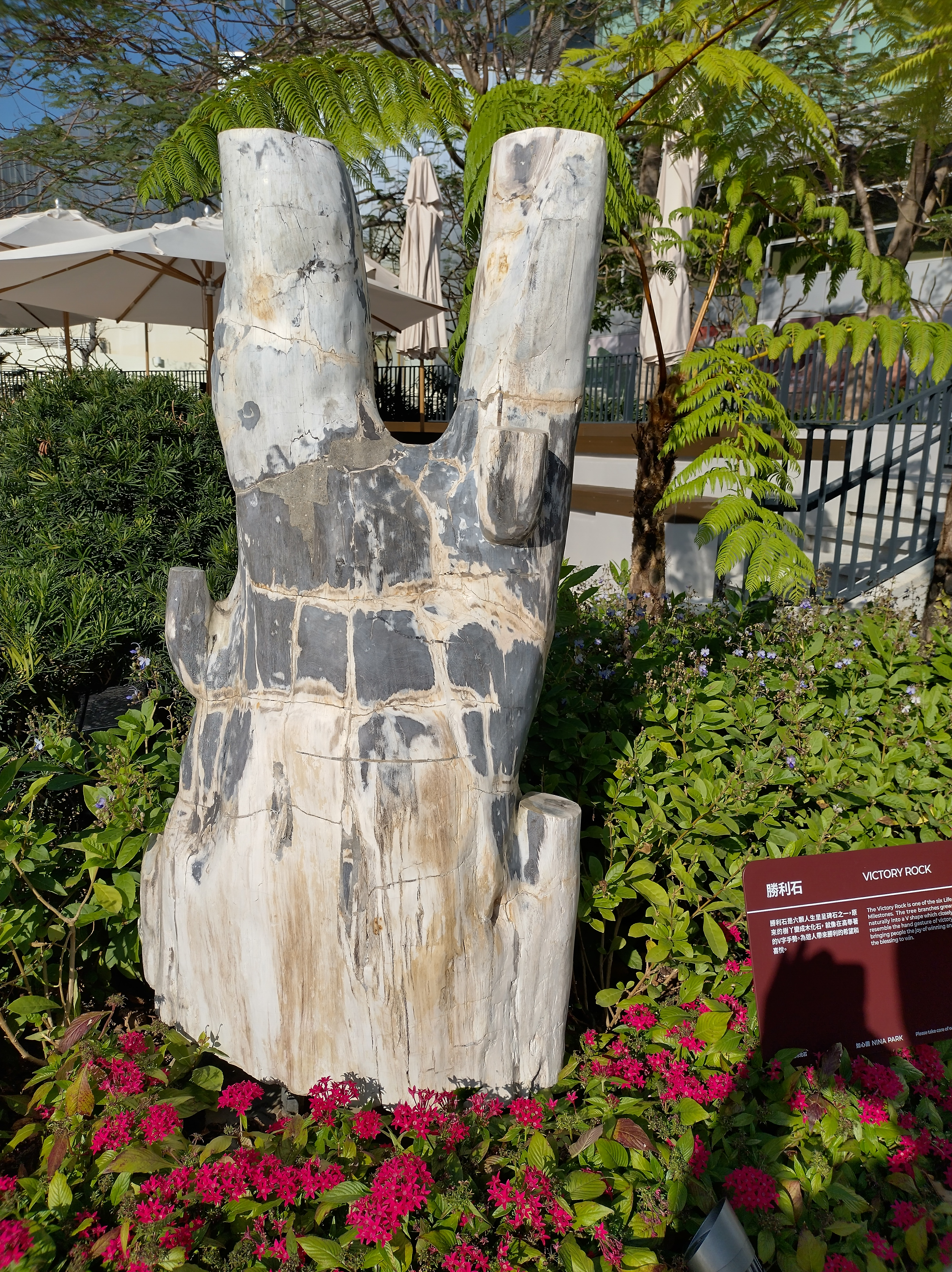
Victory Stone

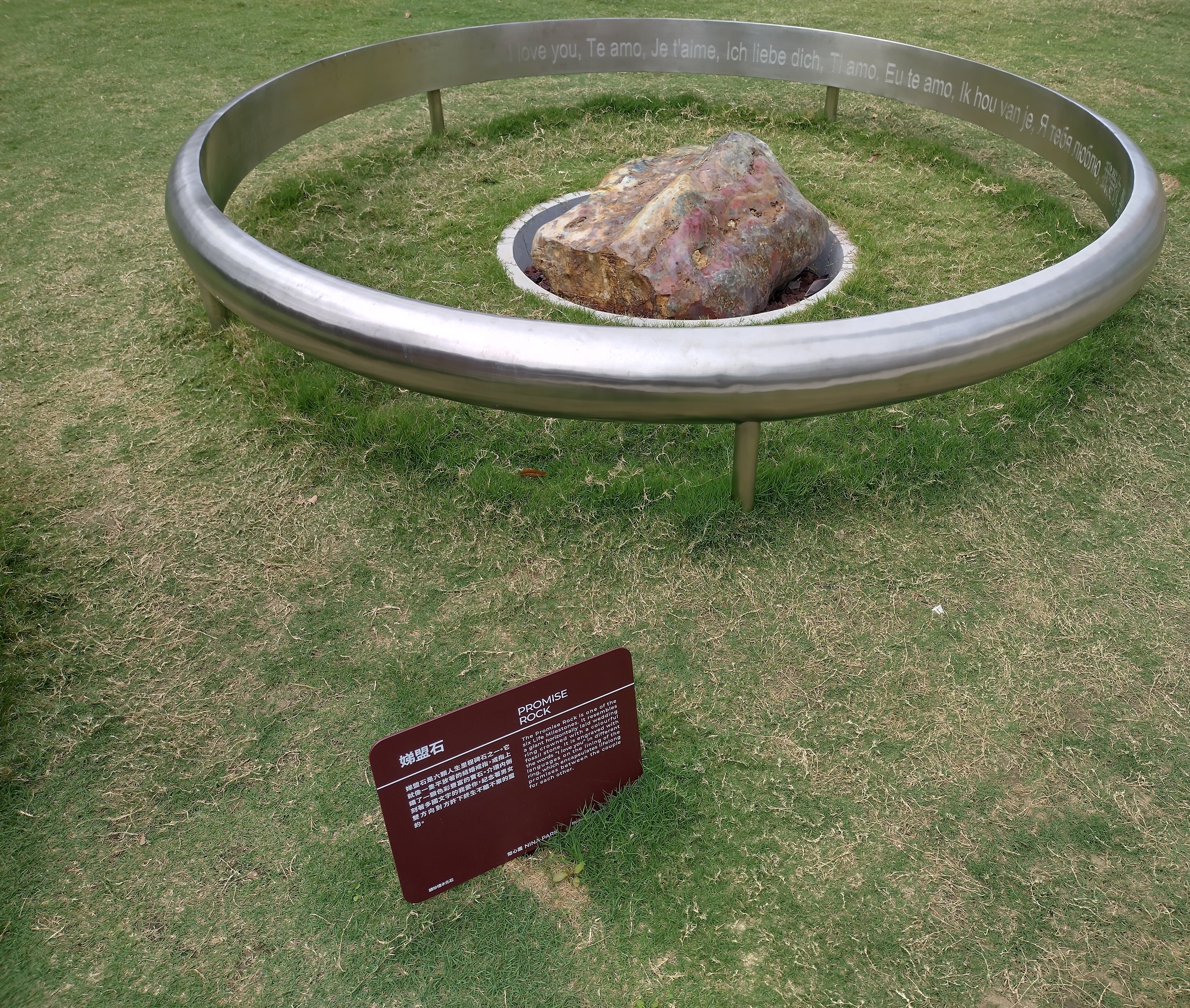
Daughter Stone

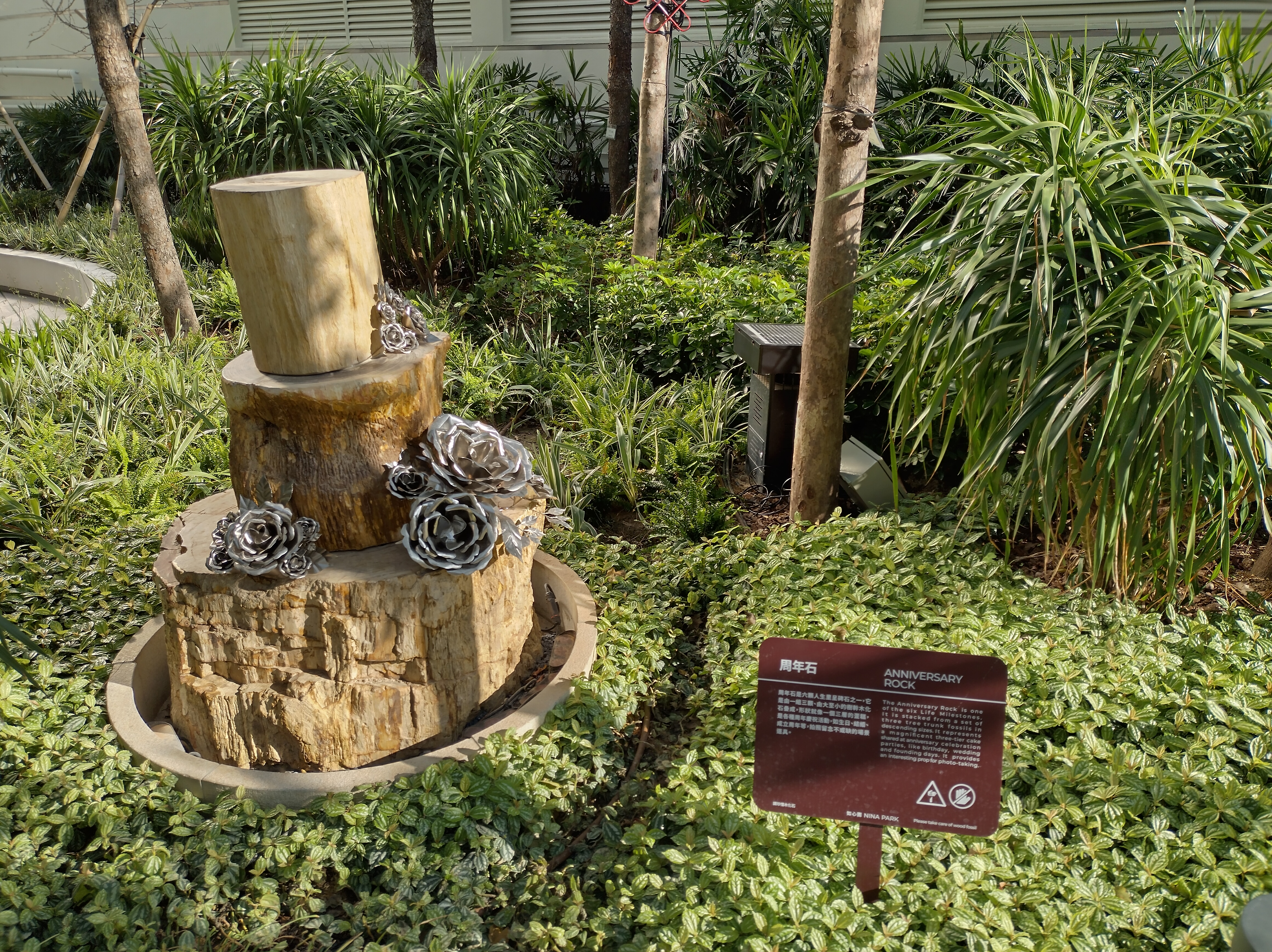
Anniversary Stone

== Activity ==
Nina Park hosts guided tours, themed workshops, and outdoor activities at its open-air theatre. Guided tours are conducted twice daily on both weekdays and weekends, with one session in the morning and another in the afternoon.The park currently offers a themed tour focusing on petrified wood and plant evolution. Conducted in Cantonese, each tour lasts approximately one hour and is limited to 15 participants. Following the reopening of the park, Chinachem stated that it intended to organise additional activities, performances, and workshops at the venue in the future.
