= Durban Bush Bucks F.C. =

Durban Bush Bucks
- Founded: 1902; 124 years ago

Durban Bush Bucks (sometimes referred to as Bush Bucks, but not to be confused with Umtata Bush Bucks, also commonly-referred to as Bush Bucks) was a South African professional soccer club based in Durban.

== History ==
Bush Bucks, coached by Clive Barker, won the inaugural 1985 season of the National Soccer League (NSL).

Bucks featured notable players including Mark Tovey, Calvin Petersen and Mlungisi Ngubane.

Bucks were relegated at the end of the 1990 season and later disbanded.

== Honours ==
- National Soccer League: 1985
