= Neil Tovey =

South African soccer player and coach

Personal information
- Full name: Neil Robert Tovey
- Date of birth: 2 July 1962 (age 64)
- Place of birth: Pretoria, South Africa
- Height: 1.81 m (5 ft 11 in)
- Position: Central defender

Youth career
- 1980–1981: Virginia United

Senior career*
Years	Team	Apps	(Gls)
1981–1985	Durban City	174	(17)
1986–1989	AmaZulu	117	(14)
1990–1999	Kaizer Chiefs	341	(27)
Total		634	(58)

International career
1992–1997	South Africa	52	(0)

Managerial career
- 1998–1999: Kaizer Chiefs (player-assistant coach)
- 2000–2001: Mamelodi Sundowns
- 2001–2002: AmaZulu
- 2003–2004: Hellenic
- 2005–2006: Mamelodi Sundowns
- 2009–2010: AmaZulu
- 2010: Mpumalanga Black Aces
- 2011–2012: Thanda Royal Zulu
- 2015–2020: South Africa (Technical Director)
- * Club domestic league appearances and goals

Neil Robert Tovey OIS (born 2 July 1962) is a South African soccer coach and former player and also brother of former footballer Mark Tovey. He was born in Pretoria. He holds the record for most appearances in the National Soccer League.

Tovey played for South Africa national football team and won 52 caps without scoring. He captained the team 29 times.

== Early career ==
Tovey was born in Pretoria but grew up in Durban. He had been playing soccer since 1969. He aspired to be a doctor before opting to play professional football. His brother Mark who was also a footballer used to give him football lessons. He was also coached at junior level at Juventus Durban by Clive Barker.

== Club career ==
=== Durban City ===
He made his professional debut for Durban City in 1981 and won the 1982 and 1983 NPSL titles under Clive Barker and played 176 league games. Tovey was transfer listed on 12 March 1986.

=== AmaZulu ===
He scored on debut in a 2--1 win over Arcadia Shepherds in Durban on 4 April 1986. He also scored in a 5--1 win over Kaizer Chiefs on 8 June 1986 in what became Chiefs' worst loss ever. He stayed until 1989 and played 117 league games.

=== Kaizer Chiefs ===
He joined Chiefs in 1990 and took over captaincy from Howard Freese in 1992 wearing the number 9 jersey. In the same season, Tovey got a record 52 starts which is still a record. He was converted to defence by Philippe Troussier. He led Chiefs to cup victory scored two very important goals in the Rothmans Cup against QwaQwa Stars and Umtata Bush Bucks. He played 341 league games for Chiefs. He played 362 matches and scored 32 goals in all competitions. In the very last match of his career and his last two touches Chiefs colours resulted in a goal in a 5–1 win over Dynamos on 9 June 1999.

== International career ==
Tovey was unable to represent South Africa internationally during the apartheid era, when the country was excluded from FIFA. Following the country's readmission in 1992, he was selected for the national team ahead of its first official international match against Cameroon on 7 July 1992. His experience and leadership led him to being named the first captain of the reinstated national team. He guided South Africa to a 1–0 victory, with Doctor Khumalo scoring a late penalty to secure the historic result.

Despite the promising start to his international career, Tovey encountered a series of setbacks in the early 1990s. He lost the captaincy after allegedly going on holiday with his family ahead of a friendly against Botswana and subsequently missed crucial World Cup qualifiers against Nigeria and Congo, although he was later cleared of any wrongdoing. He nevertheless maintained his place in the national team and did not miss another international appearance until 1997. During this period, he participated in all six matches of South Africa's unsuccessful 1994 African Cup of Nations qualifying campaign and two fixtures in their unsuccessful 1994 FIFA World Cup qualification campaign.

Following Clive Barker's appointment as head coach, Tovey assumed an important role in the national team's reconstruction. South Africa qualified automatically for the 1996 African Cup of Nations as hosts. With Steve Komphela omitted from the squad, Tovey was reinstated as captain and played a central role in the team's campaign. Despite being 33 years old and the oldest member of the squad, he started all six of South Africa's matches. Operating as a sweeper, he formed a formidable defensive partnership with former Kaizer Chiefs teammate Lucas Radebe and Mark Fish. The trio helped South Africa concede only two goals en route to the final, keeping clean sheets against Cameroon and Angola in the group stage and Ghana in the semi-finals. They also kept a clean sheet against Tunisia in the final, winning 2–0 to claim their maiden Africa Cup of Nations title. As captain, he became the first South African player to receive and lift the trophy.

His contribution to the national team continued beyond the continental triumph. Despite his advancing age, Tovey remained a regular under Barker and helped South Africa qualify for the 1998 FIFA World Cup. On 6 April 1997, aged 34 years and 278 days, he surpassed Albert Bashin Mahlangu's record of 34 years and 250 days to become South Africa's oldest international at the time. Three weeks later, his run of 37 consecutive appearances for the national team came to an end. Upon his return, he did not regain the captaincy, which remained with Lucas Radebe.

Tovey subsequently reached his 50th cap against Brazil in a preparatory friendly ahead of the 1997 FIFA Confederations Cup in Saudi Arabia. In the absence of Lucas Radebe, Tovey captained the team's first two matches of the tournament, a 2–2 draw against the Czech Republic followed by a 1–0 defeat to the United Arab Emirates. He was subsequently suspended for the final match against Uruguay after receiving yellow cards in both fixtures.

The arrival of Jomo Sono as interim coach ultimately brought Tovey's international career to an end. He was omitted from the squad for the 1998 African Cup of Nations as Sono opted to introduce younger players. At the time, he held the record for the most international appearances for South Africa, with 52 caps, before John Moshoeu surpassed his tally in 1999.

== Coaching career ==
Tovey coached Banyana Banyana to a COSAFA Cup win in 2002. Tovey saved Hellenic from relegation in the 2003–04 season. He got his UEFA A licence with a 90% pass in Hennef, Germany, which were the best marks since 1998. On 27 June 2015 Tovey became technical director of South Africa national football team.

== Personal life ==
Tovey lives in Johannesburg with his wife Nadine Tovey and has three children, Bianca (b. 1991), Jessica (b. 1993) and Sheldon (b. 1997). His second daughter Jessica was a Miss Teen SA finalist in 2011 where Tyra Banks shared a picture of her on Instagram. Sheldon wears a hearing aid and has impaired speech because oxygen was cut off from his brain after being burnt by scalding water in 1998. On 23 February 2015, Tovey was admitted to ICU after suffering from three heart attacks during a game of squash. Tovey suffered a further heart attack in October 2016, and was admitted to hospital.
