= Mlungisi Ngubane =

South African soccer player and coach

Personal information
- Full name: Mlungisi Raphael Ngubane
- Date of birth: 20 February 1956 (age 70)
- Place of birth: Umlazi, South Africa
- Position: Midfielder

Youth career
- Umlazi G Bombshell

Senior career*
Years	Team	Apps	(Gls)
1974–1978	AmaZulu		
1978–1992	Durban Bush Bucks		
- * Club domestic league appearances and goals ‡ National team caps and goals as of `

Mlungisi Raphael "Professor" Ngubane (born 20 February 1956 in Durban, KwaZulu-Natal) is a former South African soccer player and later coach of National First Division club Thanda Royal Zulu.

Ngubane played for Durban Bush Bucks.

He previously coached Durban Bush Bucks, Maritzburg United, Bush Bucks, Black Leopards and Namibia among others.
