= 1959–60 Burnley F.C. season =

English football club season

Burnley
1959–60 season
- Chairman: Bob Lord
- Manager: Harry Potts
- Stadium: Turf Moor
- First Division: 1st
- FA Cup: Sixth round
- Top goalscorer: League: John Connelly (20); All: John Connelly (24)
- Highest home attendance: 52,850 vs. Bradford City (FA Cup fifth-round replay, 23 February 1960)
- Lowest home attendance: 17,398 vs. Leeds United (First Division, 19 December 1959)
- Average home league attendance: 26,869
Home colours

The 1959–60 season was Burnley Football Club's 61st season in the Football League, and their 13th consecutive campaign in the First Division, the top tier of English football. The team, and their manager Harry Potts, endured a tense season in which Tottenham Hotspur and Wolverhampton Wanderers were the other contenders for the league title. Burnley won their second First Division championship, and their first since 1920–21, on the last matchday with a 2–1 victory at Manchester City; they had not topped the table until the last match was played out. (Note: Burnley topped the league table between 25 and 26 August after their second game but fell down to third place after the other teams completed their second fixtures.) Only two players—Alex Elder and Jimmy McIlroy—had cost a transfer fee, while the others were recruited from Burnley's youth academy. With 80,000 inhabitants, the town of Burnley became one of the smallest to have hosted an English first-tier champion. In the FA Cup, Burnley reached the sixth round before being defeated by local rivals Blackburn Rovers after a replay. Burnley won the local Lancashire Cup for the fifth time in their history after defeating Manchester United in the final. After the regular season ended, the Burnley squad travelled to the United States to participate in the first edition of the International Soccer League.

During the season, 18 players made at least one appearance for the club, with Jimmy Adamson, Brian Miller and Ray Pointer present in all 50 competitive matches. The team's top goalscorer was John Connelly with 24 goals, including 20 in the league. The highest attendance recorded at home ground Turf Moor was 52,850 for the FA Cup fifth-round replay match against Bradford City; the lowest was 17,398 for a league game against Leeds United. The average league attendance at Turf Moor was 26,869, around one-third of the town's population.

== Background and pre-season ==
The 1959–60 campaign was Burnley's 61st season in the Football League, and their 13th consecutive season in the First Division, since promotion from the Second Division in 1946–47. The team had finished the 1958–59 season in seventh place and had reached the sixth round of the FA Cup. Burnley ended the campaign with 8 wins out of 13 in the league, and approached the new season with confidence. The club's chairman, Bob Lord, was elected to the position in 1955. Lord only appointed managers with a previous playing career at the club; he selected Harry Potts for the post in February 1958. Burnley had become one of the most progressive clubs under Lord, who was described by the scriptwriter Arthur Hopcraft as "the Khrushchev of Burnley" as a result of his authoritarian attitude. Burnley were one of the first to set up a purpose-built training ground (at Gawthorpe in 1955), which included a medical room, a gymnasium, three full-size pitches and an all-weather surface. The club also became renowned for its youth policy and scouting system. Burnley's scouts—including Jack Hixon—focused particularly on North East England, Scotland and Northern Ireland.

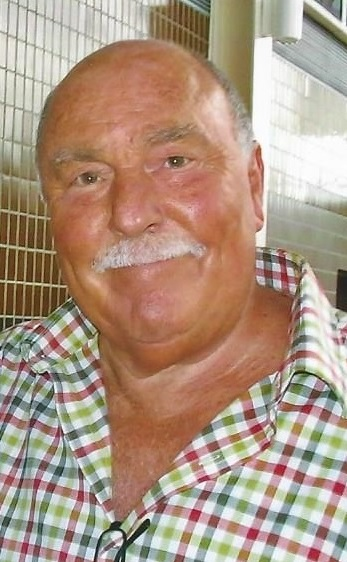
Jimmy Greaves (2007 photograph) was an admirer of Burnley's playing style.

During matches, Potts often employed the then unfashionable 4–4–2 formation and he implemented a Total Football playing style. Billy Wright of Wolverhampton Wanderers described Burnley's playing style as "progressing [from defense to attack] by nicely controlled patterns with every man searching hungrily for space". Jimmy Greaves labelled the team's style of play as "smooth, skilled football that was a warming advertisement for all that was best about British football". Most Burnley players had been recruited from the club's youth academy—only Alex Elder and Jimmy McIlroy had cost a transfer fee. Both players were bought from Northern Irish club Glentoran; McIlroy transferred to Burnley for £8,000 in 1950, while Elder cost the club £5,000 in January 1959.

Potts made no major additions to his squad during pre-season, while Ken Bracewell (to Tranmere Rovers), Albert Cheesebrough (to Leicester City for £20,000), Doug Newlands (to Stoke City for £12,000) and Les Shannon (retired) left the club. On 17 August 1959, the team played a pre-season friendly against Glentoran, which was organised as part of Elder's transfer. Burnley defeated their opponents 8–1, with Jimmy Robson scoring four times. Burnley's kit remained unchanged from the previous seasons: a claret jersey with light blue sleeves, a light blue stripe around the collar, and white shorts along with claret and light blue socks.

== First Division ==
=== August to December ===
Burnley's First Division campaign began with a 3–2 win over Leeds United at Elland Road on 22 August, with goals from Brian Pilkington, John Connelly, and Ray Pointer. Ahead of Burnley's first home match of the season at Turf Moor against Everton, Potts wrote in the club's matchday programme: "We pride ourselves on being a footballing team and no club can be more eager to meet the demand for better play". The team defeated Everton 5–2, but then lost 3–1 at home to West Ham United, despite taking the lead through Connelly. Burnley's form remained inconsistent: a 4–1 away loss against Chelsea was followed by 2–1 wins against local rival Preston North End and West Bromwich Albion, after coming from behind on both occasions. Potts had selected the same starting line-up for the first seven matches, but he made several changes to his side for the reverse fixture against Preston on 15 September. Billy White replaced McIlroy, who was injured, while Bobby Seith had contacted giant urticaria and was replaced by Tommy Cummings, leaving the left-back position open for the 18-year-old Elder to make his debut. Burnley lost the fixture 1–0 but Elder played well against Preston's England international Tom Finney and remained in the starting line-up.

Burnley ended September by defeating Newcastle United and Birmingham City, both by a scoreline of 3–1. The team were a point behind league leaders Tottenham Hotspur, who were their next opponents. Both sides were missing key players—Spurs were without Dave Mackay and Danny Blanchflower, while McIlroy, Burnley's playmaker, was still absent. The match ended in a 1–1 draw, after defender Brian Miller equalised for Burnley in the 87th minute. Burnley then faced Lancashire rivals Blackpool at home; Burnley took the lead through Robson but the visitors scored four goals to win 4–1. Before the East Lancashire derby at Blackburn Rovers on 17 October, Potts received criticism from the Burnley supporters who objected to his "confusing playing style", such as the defenders switching positions during matches. Against Blackburn, Burnley equalised twice, but the hosts scored a third goal to win 3–2. McIlroy was back to full fitness for the match against Manchester City a week later and led the team to a 4–3 victory. Burnley ended October with a 1–1 draw at Luton Town after being 1–0 down. On 7 November, Burnley defeated Wolverhampton Wanderers 4–1 at Turf Moor; Wolves were the First Division champions of the previous two seasons. Two weeks later, Burnley recorded their largest post-war league win when they beat Nottingham Forest, the previous season's FA Cup winners, 8–0 at home. The team kept their first clean sheet of the season, and Robson became the club's first player in over 30 years to score five goals in one match. It was followed by a 1–0 loss against newly promoted Fulham on 28 November.

After beating Bolton Wanderers 4–0 on 5 December, Burnley defeated Arsenal 4–2 at Highbury a week later. Arsenal led 2–0 after the first half; during half-time Potts pushed McIlroy and Miller forward. The team turned the match around: Jimmy Adamson, Burnley's captain, scored a penalty kick halfway through the second half and Connelly completed a hat-trick inside 16 minutes. McIlroy received many plaudits for his performance, even though he had picked up a groin strain injury early during the game. With McIlroy absent, Burnley hosted last-place Leeds United on 19 December in front of a season-lowest crowd of 17,398. Leeds won 1–0 and Burnley slipped down from third to fourth place in the table, three points behind leaders Tottenham. On Boxing Day, Burnley defeated Manchester United 2–1 at Old Trafford; forward Ian Lawson came back into the team after three years and scored the winner. In the return fixture against United two days later, Burnley lost 4–1 in front of 47,696 spectators—the highest home league crowd of the season.

=== January to May ===
The team's first match of 1960 resulted in a 5–2 victory away at title contenders West Ham. The Sunday Pictorial concluded: "If they go on playing like this they'll soon have nobody above them". Burnley then defeated Chelsea 2–1 on a snowy Turf Moor pitch and drew 0–0 with West Brom to end January in second place in the table. Burnley beat Newcastle United 2–1 on 6 February, the scorers being Robson with a shot from 30 yards (27 m) and Pointer with a lob. The match against Birmingham City a week later was postponed due to poor weather. On 1 March, the team recorded a 2–0 home win over league leaders Tottenham to close the gap to three points, but with two games in hand on Spurs. Burnley also defeated Blackburn Rovers 1–0 and Arsenal 3–2 to win three league matches in a row. On 30 March, Burnley played second-placed Wolverhampton Wanderers but were overwhelmed by "Wolves' fast, direct power play" and were defeated 6–1. The following game, at home against Sheffield Wednesday, ended in a 3–3 draw after Miller equalised for Burnley in the 88th minute. It was Seith's last match for the club; he read in the Burnley Express that he would not play the next game against Nottingham Forest and was aggrieved at not being told directly by Potts. A dispute followed, after which Seith was put on the transfer list. Potts moved Adamson to the centre-half position to partner Cummings, while Miller was placed in midfield. The team recorded three consecutive wins: Forest and Leicester City were both defeated 1–0, while Burnley beat Luton 3–0 despite only having 10 men for most of the game, after Pointer came off injured. Connelly scored the winning goal against Leicester, his 20th league goal of the season, but picked up a cartilage injury during the match and was out for the remainder of the season; he was replaced by Trevor Meredith. On 18 April, Meredith scored his first goal in a 2–1 defeat in the return game at Leicester, with former Burnley player Cheesebrough netting the winner for the home team.

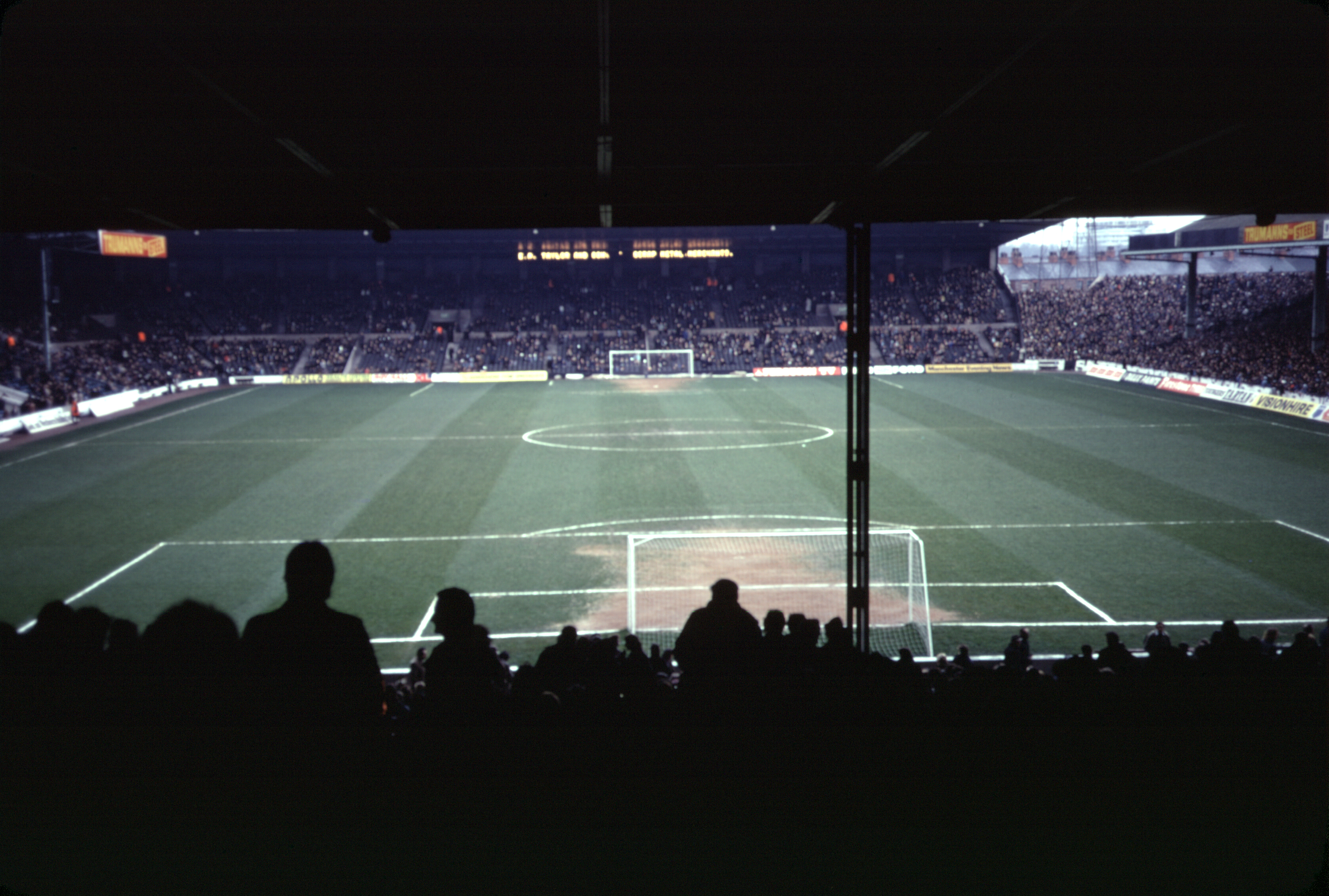
Burnley won their second First Division championship on the last matchday with a 2–1 victory at Maine Road (1975 photograph).

Five days later, Burnley drew 1–1 at Blackpool after the hosts equalised with six minutes remaining. Jim Furnell made his Burnley debut in goal as Adam Blacklaw was out injured. The team's main rivals for the league title, Tottenham and Wolverhampton Wanderers, met on the same day at Wolves' Molineux Stadium; Spurs won 3–1 to leave the title race open. Blacklaw returned in goal for the match against Birmingham City on 27 April, while Cummings, McIlroy and Miller also played despite having minor injuries; Burnley won 1–0 after a late goal from Pilkington. With the victory, the team moved up to second place behind Wolves on goal average and one point ahead of Tottenham. As Burnley's last home match of the season ended in a goalless draw with Fulham, while Wolves and Tottenham were both victorious in their final games, Burnley needed to win their last match at Manchester City to claim the league title. On 2 May, in front of almost 66,000 spectators at Maine Road—including Wolves manager Stan Cullis and several of his players—Burnley went ahead after four minutes when Pilkington's shot deflected off City's Bert Trautmann into the net. The hosts soon equalised through Joe Hayes but Meredith's volley put Burnley back in front after half an hour. Blacklaw made several saves and the team held on to the lead. Burnley were crowned First Division champions for the second time, and won their first top flight title in 39 years. They had not led the table until the last match was played out. The Daily Mirror noted: "Burnley, the team of quiet men—five of them are part-timers and the whole outfit cost less than £15,000—snatched the First Division Championship from the teeth of the famous Wolves".

Burnley's population had reduced by around 20 per cent since the club won the First Division in 1921; with 80,000 inhabitants in 1960, the town became one of the smallest to have hosted an English first-tier champion. During the season, Burnley attracted an average crowd of 26,869, equal to around one-third of the town's population, the highest ratio in the top flight. The team won the title with one of the lowest post-war point tallies (55), one of the smallest goal averages (1.39), and one of the highest numbers of goals conceded (61).

=== Match results ===
Key

- In result column, Burnley's score shown first
- H = Home match
- A = Away match
- pen. = Penalty kick
- o.g. = Own goal

Results

Date	Opponents	Result	Goalscorers	Attendance
22 August 1959	Leeds United (A)	3–2	Pilkington, Connelly, Pointer	20,233
25 August 1959	Everton (H)	5–2	Connelly (2), Pilkington, Pointer, Robson	29,165
29 August 1959	West Ham United (H)	1–3	Connelly	26,756
2 September 1959	Everton (A)	2–1	Pointer (2)	39,416
5 September 1959	Chelsea (A)	1–4	Connelly	36,023
8 September 1959	Preston North End (H)	2–1	Pointer, Robson	29,195
12 September 1959	West Bromwich Albion (H)	2–1	Robson, Pilkington	23,907
15 September 1959	Preston North End (A)	0–1		27,299
19 September 1959	Newcastle United (A)	3–1	McIlroy, Connelly (2)	38,576
26 September 1959	Birmingham City (H)	3–1	Pointer, McIlroy, Connelly	23,848
3 October 1959	Tottenham Hotspur (A)	1–1	Miller	42,717
10 October 1959	Blackpool (H)	1–4	Robson	28,104
17 October 1959	Blackburn Rovers (A)	2–3	Pilkington, Douglas (o.g.)	33,316
24 October 1959	Manchester City (H)	4–3	Pilkington, Pointer, White (2)	28,653
31 October 1959	Luton Town (A)	1–1	Pointer	15,638
7 November 1959	Wolverhampton Wanderers (H)	4–1	Pointer (2), Robson, Connelly	27,793
14 November 1959	Sheffield Wednesday (A)	1–1	Robson	18,420
21 November 1959	Nottingham Forest (H)	8–0	Robson (5), Pilkington, Pointer (2)	24,349
28 November 1959	Fulham (A)	0–1		29,582
5 December 1959	Bolton Wanderers (H)	4–0	Pointer, Connelly, McIlroy (2)	26,510
12 December 1959	Arsenal (A)	4–2	Adamson (pen.), Connelly (3)	26,056
19 December 1959	Leeds United (H)	0–1		17,398
26 December 1959	Manchester United (A)	2–1	Robson, Lawson	62,673
28 December 1959	Manchester United (H)	1–4	Robson	47,696
2 January 1960	West Ham United (A)	5–2	Lawson (2), Pilkington, Connelly (2)	25,752
16 January 1960	Chelsea (H)	2–1	Robson (2)	21,916
23 January 1960	West Bromwich Albion (A)	0–0		23,512
6 February 1960	Newcastle United (H)	2–1	Robson, Pointer	26,998
27 February 1960	Bolton Wanderers (A)	1–2	Connelly	28,772
1 March 1960	Tottenham Hotspur (H)	2–0	Pointer, Connelly	32,992
5 March 1960	Blackburn Rovers (H)	1–0	Robson	32,331
19 March 1960	Arsenal (H)	3–2	Pointer, Miller, Connelly	20,327
30 March 1960	Wolverhampton Wanderers (A)	1–6	Pointer	33,953
2 April 1960	Sheffield Wednesday (H)	3–3	Connelly, McIlroy (pen.), Miller	23,123
9 April 1960	Nottingham Forest (A)	1–0	Pointer	24,640
15 April 1960	Leicester City (H)	1–0	Connelly	23,777
16 April 1960	Luton Town (H)	3–0	Pointer, Robson, McIlroy (pen.)	20,893
18 April 1960	Leicester City (A)	1–2	Meredith	24,429
23 April 1960	Blackpool (A)	1–1	Meredith	23,753
27 April 1960	Birmingham City (A)	1–0	Pilkington	37,032
30 April 1960	Fulham (H)	0–0		30,807
2 May 1960	Manchester City (A)	2–1	Pilkington, Meredith	65,981

=== Partial league table ===
First Division final table, positions 1–5
Pos	Club	Pld	W	D	L	F	A	GA	Pts
1	Burnley	42	24	7	11	85	61	1.39	55
2	Wolverhampton Wanderers	42	24	6	12	106	67	1.58	54
3	Tottenham Hotspur	42	21	11	10	86	50	1.72	53
4	West Bromwich Albion	42	19	11	12	83	57	1.46	49
5	Sheffield Wednesday	42	19	11	12	80	59	1.36	49

== FA Cup ==
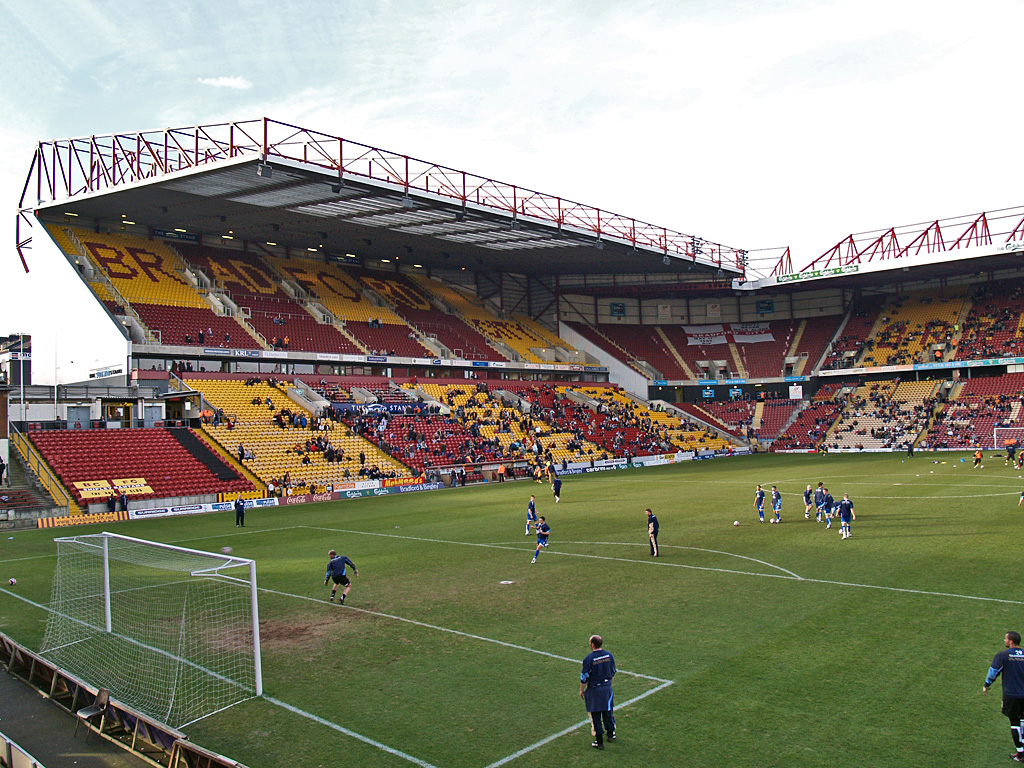
Burnley drew 2–2 with Bradford City at a very muddy Valley Parade pitch (2008 photograph).

Burnley entered the season's FA Cup in the third round where they were drawn away against Second Division side Lincoln City; the game finished in a 1–1 draw, necessitating a replay at Turf Moor. Although not fully fit, McIlroy returned in the starting line-up and opened the scoring from the penalty spot. He provided the assist for Pilkington's headed goal to lead Burnley to a 2–0 victory and qualification for the fourth round. The team faced mid-table Second Division side Swansea Town at Vetch Field and drew 0–0; the Swansea manager Trevor Morris was confident and stated: "We'll win the replay". At Turf Moor, Robson scored twice to put Burnley 2–0 ahead, before Swansea's Mel Nurse halved the lead in the 83rd minute. The team held on to the lead to set up a fifth-round fixture with Third Division side Bradford City, who were undefeated in 18 matches.

City's Valley Parade pitch was very muddy, which hindered Burnley in their passing game, and City took a 2–0 lead. With ten minutes remaining, Connelly dribbled through the Bradford defence and put the ball past their goalkeeper. He scored his second goal in injury time to salvage a replay for Burnley, following a scramble in City's penalty area. The replay took place three days later at Turf Moor, in front of an official attendance of 52,850. Some of the gates were broken down, however, and many uncounted fans poured into the ground. The road from Bradford was closed due to the traffic, and numerous Bradford City and Burnley supporters were denied entry by the local police. On an icy Turf Moor pitch, Burnley ran out 5–0 winners and advanced to the sixth round.

Burnley were drawn at home for the first time in the FA Cup campaign. On 12 March, they faced arch-rivals Blackburn Rovers in front of 51,501 spectators at Turf Moor. Burnley quickly went 2–0 up in the second half: McIlroy set up both goals, with Pilkington and then Pointer finding the net. Connelly added a third before Blackburn scored three times in the final 15 minutes to draw the match 3–3. After a goalless 90 minutes in the replay, Rovers scored twice in extra time to eliminate Burnley from the competition. Robson had played while being ill, and McIlroy was again not fully fit and concluded: "I had probably my poorest ever game in a Burnley shirt". Blackburn advanced to the final where they lost 3–0 to Wolves.

=== Match results ===
Key

- In result column, Burnley's score shown first
- H = Home match
- A = Away match
- pen. = Penalty kick
- o.g. = Own goal

Results

Date	Round	Opponents	Result	Goalscorers	Attendance
9 January 1960	Third	Lincoln City (A)	1–1	Pointer	21,693
12 January 1960	Third (replay)	Lincoln City (H)	2–0	McIlroy (pen.), Pilkington	35,456
30 January 1960	Fourth	Swansea Town (A)	0–0		29,976
2 February 1960	Fourth (replay)	Swansea Town (H)	2–1	Robson (2)	37,040
20 February 1960	Fifth	Bradford City (A)	2–2	Connelly (2)	26,244
23 February 1960	Fifth (replay)	Bradford City (H)	5–0	Pointer (2), Robson (2), Connelly	52,850
12 March 1960	Sixth	Blackburn Rovers (H)	3–3	Pilkington, Pointer, Connelly	51,501
16 March 1960	Sixth (replay)	Blackburn Rovers (A)	0–2		53,892

== Player details ==
Potts used only 18 different players in the First Division during the season, the lowest number in the division. Ten players scored at least one goal and one opposition player scored an own goal. The team usually played in a 4–4–2 formation throughout the season, with four defenders, four midfielders and two forwards. Miller, Adamson and Pointer featured in all 50 league and cup games; Blacklaw, John Angus and Pilkington each missed one First Division match and made 49 appearances for the club. Angus would go on to set a club record for appearances for outfield players with 521. Gordon Harris made just two appearances for Burnley in the First Division, while Billy Marshall and Furnell featured in only one league match during the campaign. Connelly was the top goalscorer for Burnley with 24 goals, including 20 in the league. With a tally of 23 goals, Pointer was the second-highest scorer, followed by Robson with 22; both players also scored four goals in the FA Cup. Connelly, Pointer and Robson scored two-thirds of the club's 85 league goals.

Players having played at least one first-team match
Pos.	Nat.	Name	First Division		FA Cup		Total	
Pos.	Nat.	Name	Apps	Goals	Apps	Goals	Apps	Goals
GK	SCO	Adam Blacklaw	41	0	8	0	49	0
GK	ENG	Jim Furnell	1	0	0	0	1	0
DF	ENG	John Angus	41	0	8	0	49	0
DF	ENG	Tommy Cummings	23	0	0	0	23	0
DF	NIR	Alex Elder	34	0	8	0	42	0
DF	NIR	Billy Marshall	1	0	0	0	1	0
DF	ENG	Brian Miller	42	3	8	0	50	3
DF	SCO	Bobby Seith	27	0	8	0	35	0
MF	ENG	Jimmy Adamson	42	1	8	0	50	1
MF	ENG	John Connelly	34	20	8	4	42	24
MF	ENG	Gordon Harris	2	0	0	0	2	0
MF	NIR	Jimmy McIlroy	32	6	6	1	38	7
MF	ENG	Trevor Meredith	7	3	0	0	7	3
MF	ENG	Brian Pilkington	41	9	8	2	49	11
FW	ENG	Ian Lawson	8	3	1	0	9	3
FW	ENG	Ray Pointer	42	19	8	4	50	23
FW	ENG	Jimmy Robson	38	18	8	4	46	22
FW	ENG	Billy White	6	2	1	0	7	2

GK = Goalkeeper, DF = Defender, MF = Midfielder, FW = Forward

== Minor competitions ==
=== Lancashire Cup ===
Burnley also participated in the local Lancashire Cup, although their starting line-ups consisted primarily of reserve and youth players. Their first game, against Manchester City on 23 November, ended in a 5–1 victory with five different goalscorers for the team—White, Ron Fenton, Ian Towers, Andy Lochhead and Harris. Burnley's next match, at Chester, ended in a 3–1 win and qualification for the semi-final. Burnley were drawn away against Preston North End and won by a scoreline of 3–0. Burnley secured their fifth Lancashire Cup title after winning the final 4–2 against Manchester United at Turf Moor. Walter Joyce and Harris each scored one goal, while Lochhead netted twice.

==== Match results ====
Key

- In result column, Burnley's score shown first
- H = Home match
- A = Away match
- pen. = Penalty kick
- o.g. = Own goal

Results

Date	Round	Opponents	Result	Goalscorers
23 November 1959	Round of 16	Manchester City (H)	5–1	White, Fenton, Towers, Lochhead, Harris
13 January 1960	Quarter-final	Chester (A)	3–1	Meredith, Harris (2)
22 March 1960	Semi-final	Preston North End (A)	3–0	Lochhead, Simpson, Harris
12 April 1960	Final	Manchester United (H)	4–2	Joyce, Lochhead (2), Harris

=== International Soccer League ===
After the regular season ended, Burnley travelled to the United States to represent England in the initial edition of the International Soccer League, which was the first modern attempt to create an American soccer league. The team entered the first group, together with five other sides from Europe and North America. Burnley beat their first opponents Bayern Munich 3–0 through goals from Pointer, Pilkington and Miller. In the second game, Burnley faced Kilmarnock, the 1959–60 Scottish Football League runners-up, and lost 2–0. The team then drew 3–3 with home side New York Americans before defeating Northern Irish club Glenavon 6–2, with Pilkington scoring a hat-trick. In their final group match, Burnley faced French club Nice, who had won four Ligue 1 titles during the 1950s, most recently in 1958–59. Burnley defeated Nice 4–0 and finished as runners-up in the group behind Kilmarnock, who advanced to the final but lost against Brazilian side Bangu. Although Burnley faced strong opponents, the players found it hard to take the tournament seriously. The stadium announcer often misinterpreted the referee's decisions, the crowd showed little interest in the games, and according to McIlroy, every match would end with a countdown "worthy of a space-rocket launching".

==== Match results ====
Key

- In result column, Burnley's score shown first
- H = Home match
- A = Away match
- N = Neutral match
- pen. = Penalty kick
- o.g. = Own goal

Results

Date	Round	Opponents	Result	Goalscorers
28 May 1960	Group stage	Bayern Munich (N; in New York)	3–0	Pointer, Pilkington, Miller
1 June 1960	Group stage	Kilmarnock (N; in New York)	0–2	
4 June 1960	Group stage	New York Americans (A)	3–3	Pointer, Robson (2)
11 June 1960	Group stage	Glenavon (N; in New York)	6–2	Pilkington (3), Miller (2), Harris
19 June 1960	Group stage	Nice (N; in Jersey City)	4–0	Pilkington, Lawson (2), Robson

== Aftermath ==
Bobby Seith, who had been placed on the transfer list by the club, was sold to Dundee in August 1960 for a fee of £7,500. Although he had made 27 First Division appearances during the season, Seith was not awarded a championship medal, although he would finally receive one in 1999. Trevor Meredith, who scored the title-winning goal, was ineligible for a winners' medal after making only a handful of appearances, but was later presented with one during a home match against Manchester City in 2026.

Burnley's championship-winning team remained intact going into the 1960–61 season and was strengthened with reserve and youth players such as Joyce and Lochhead. Burnley would go on to compete in six different competitions the following season—the First Division, the FA Cup, the newly created Football League Cup, the FA Charity Shield, the European Cup and the Lancashire Cup.
