= 1960 FA Charity Shield =

- Event: FA Charity Shield
| Burnley | Wolverhampton Wanderers |
| 2 | 2 |
- Date: 13 August 1960
- Venue: Turf Moor, Burnley
- Referee: George McCabe
- Attendance: 19,873

The 1960 FA Charity Shield was the 38th FA Charity Shield, a football match between the winners of the previous season's First Division and FA Cup titles. The match was contested by league champions Burnley and FA Cup winners Wolverhampton Wanderers.

The two clubs had been the main challengers for the league title the previous season, with Burnley pipping Wolves by just a single point. This denied the Midlands club a third successive league championship, and the first 'double' of the 20th century.

The match was staged at Burnley's home ground, Turf Moor. The game ended a 2–2 draw, meaning the Shield was shared.

== Match details ==
13 August 1960

| Burnley | 2–2 | Wolverhampton Wanderers |
|---|---|---|
| Miller 13'; Connelly 87' | Report | Deeley 55'; Murray 88' |

Turf Moor, Burnley
Attendance: 19,873
Referee: George McCabe

| Burnley | Wolverhampton Wanderers |

| 1 | (Scotland) Adam Blacklaw |
| 2 | (England) John Angus |
| 3 | (Northern Ireland) Alex Elder |
| 4 | (England) Jimmy Adamson (c) |
| 5 | (England) Tommy Cummings |
| 6 | (England) Brian Miller |
| 7 | (England) John Connelly |
| 8 | (Northern Ireland) Jimmy McIlroy |
| 9 | (England) Ray Pointer |
| 10 | (England) Jimmy Robson |
| 11 | (England) Brian Pilkington |
Manager:
(England) Harry Potts

| 1 | (England) Geoff Sidebottom |
| 2 | (England) George Showell |
| 3 | (England) Gerry Harris |
| 4 | (England) John Kirkham |
| 5 | (Union of South Africa) Eddie Stuart (c) |
| 6 | (England) Eddie Clamp |
| 7 | (England) Gerry Mannion |
| 8 | (England) Barry Stobart |
| 9 | (England) Jimmy Murray |
| 10 | (England) Peter Broadbent |
| 11 | (England) Norman Deeley |
Manager:
(England) Stan Cullis
