= 1962 FA Cup final =

- Event: 1961–62 FA Cup
Tottenham Hotspur	Burnley
3	1
- Date: 5 May 1962
- Venue: Wembley Stadium, London
- Referee: Jim Finney (Hereford)
- Attendance: 100,000

The 1962 FA Cup final took place on 5 May 1962 at Wembley Stadium and was won by Tottenham Hotspur over Burnley, by a 3–1 scoreline. Due to the lack of passion and excitement, replaced by patience and cautious play, the final was dubbed "The Chessboard Final". Tottenham were the holders, having won the League and FA Cup Double the previous season. They had finished the 1962 league campaign in third place. Burnley finished runners-up in the league that season, behind Ipswich Town.

== Road to Wembley ==
=== Tottenham Hotspur ===
Home teams listed first. All teams from Division One, except Plymouth Argyle (Division Two)

Round 3: Birmingham City 3–3 Tottenham Hotspur (Greaves 2, Jones)

Replay: Tottenham Hotspur 4–2 Birmingham City (Medwin 2, Allen, Greaves)

Round 4: Plymouth Argyle 1–5 Tottenham Hotspur (Medwin, White, Greaves 2, Jones)

Round 5: West Bromwich Albion 2–4 Tottenham Hotspur (Smith 2, Greaves 2)

Round 6: Tottenham Hotspur 2–0 Aston Villa (Blanchflower, Jones)

Semi-final: Tottenham Hotspur 3–1 Manchester United (at Hillsborough Stadium, Sheffield) (Medwin, Greaves, Jones)

=== Burnley ===
Home teams listed first. All teams from Division One, except Leyton Orient (Division Two) and Queens Park Rangers (Division Three)

Round 3: Burnley 6–1 Queens Park Rangers (Harris 2, Elder, Connelly, Mcllroy, Ingham o.g.)

Round 4: Burnley 1–1 Leyton Orient (Harris)

Replay: Leyton Orient 0–1 Burnley (Miller)

Round 5: Burnley 3–1 Everton (Miller, Connelly, Robson)

Round 6: Sheffield United 0–1 Burnley (Pointer)

Semi-final: Burnley 1–1 Fulham (at Villa Park, Birmingham) (Connelly)

Replay: Burnley 2–1 Fulham (at Filbert Street, Leicester) (Robson 2)

== Match review ==
Tottenham Hotspur took an early lead when Jimmy Greaves scored past Burnley goalkeeper Adam Blacklaw with a low left foot shot to the right corner of the net. The score remained 1–0 until half time. Burnley equalised shortly after the interval through Jimmy Robson, who in doing so had scored the 100th FA Cup Final goal at Wembley. However, Bobby Smith quickly countered for Tottenham Hotspur to restore their one-goal lead. Smith had scored in the 1961 final and remained the only player to score in successive finals for the next forty years, until Freddie Ljungberg of Arsenal repeated the feat with goals in the 2001 and 2002 finals.

With ten minutes remaining, Burnley defender Tommy Cummings handled the ball on the goal-line and a penalty was awarded to Tottenham. Danny Blanchflower sealed victory for Tottenham with a penalty that sent Blacklaw the wrong way, securing Tottenham Hotspur's fourth FA Cup title.

Despite the opinion of the final by the press, the game itself actually produced more action in the penalty area than any previous post-war final, with the two keepers being forced into more saves from shots on target than any two keepers in any previous post-war final.

The game also pivoted on two moments of controversy. The first came midway through the second half when Jimmy Robson was put through to score what looked like a second equaliser for Burnley. The linesman's flag ruled the goal out and while BBC television pictures are not conclusive the call was an extremely close one. The second centred on Tottenham's decisive penalty when the opposite linesman flagged for a foul, presumably on goalkeeper Blacklaw seconds before the handball incident for which the penalty was awarded. The referee did not seem to see the linesman's flag and pointed to the spot while, to their credit, none of the Burnley players protested.

== Media coverage ==
The game was the nineteenth cup final to be broadcast in its entirety by the BBC, for the fourth time as a Grandstand special. The commentator was Kenneth Wolstenholme, whose post-match comments again went against the majority of the media when he stated that it was his belief that the final would "rank among the great post-war finals", having been "keenly contested by two great teams", a statement supported by the match statistics.

As in all broadcasts of previous finals, the game was televised in black and white with score updates being provided by camera shots of Wembley's large scoreboard. However, in a new innovation the BBC introduced zoomed-in shots of the match which gave television spectators the feeling that they were just yards away from the action. All previous finals had been filmed almost entirely from one or two cameras giving long-range images of the game. Radio cameras, situated behind each goal, were brought more into use in this final, having previously been in position but virtually ignored by the director in the previous six finals.

Both major cinema newsreels, Pathé and Movietone, covered the game for broadcast in their newsreels that evening throughout the United Kingdom and Ireland. Both companies filmed the game in colour, with both commentaries echoing the belief that it had been a classic final. Both companies also gained access to the post-match celebrations in the Tottenham dressing room

BBC Radio commentary was provided by Raymond Glendenning and Alan Clarke

A few seconds of newsreel footage of the crowd at the final was used in the "ode to joy" scene of the 1965 Beatles feature film Help!

== Guest of honour ==
The Queen and the Duke of Edinburgh were the official guests of honour. The former presented the trophy while the latter had been introduced to the two teams before the game. This final also marked the end of the tradition of the winning captain leading the stadium in three cheers for Her Majesty and the playing of the national anthem after the presentation. The national anthem was still sung before and after the final until 1971.

This was the last final with exposed terraces at Wembley; by 1963 the roof had been extended all the way around the stadium in preparation for the 1966 FIFA World Cup.

Edwin Mosscrop, who featured in the winning Burnley team in the 1914 final, was an invited guest of Burnley and went onto the pitch before this final. He was the last surviving pre-First World War international player when he died in 1980.

== European qualification ==
Tottenham's victory in the competition paved the way for them to compete in the European Cup Winners' Cup for the 1962–63 campaign. They went on to win the trophy, making them the first English and British club to win a European trophy.

== Match details ==
5 May 1962

Tottenham Hotspur	3–1	Burnley
Greaves 3'; Smith 51'; Blanchflower 80' (pen.)	Report	Robson 50'

Wembley, London
Attendance: 100,000
Referee: Jim Finney

Tottenham Hotspur	Burnley

1	(Scotland) Bill Brown
2	(England) Peter Baker
3	(England) Ron Henry
4	(Northern Ireland) Danny Blanchflower (c)
5	(England) Maurice Norman
6	(Scotland) Dave Mackay
7	(Wales) Terry Medwin
8	(Scotland) John White
9	(England) Bobby Smith
10	(England) Jimmy Greaves
11	(Wales) Cliff Jones
Manager:
(England) Bill Nicholson

1	(Scotland) Adam Blacklaw
2	(England) John Angus
3	(Northern Ireland) Alex Elder
4	(England) Jimmy Adamson (c)
5	(England) Tommy Cummings
6	(England) Brian Miller
7	(England) John Connelly
8	(Northern Ireland) Jimmy McIlroy
9	(England) Ray Pointer
10	(England) Jimmy Robson
11	(England) Gordon Harris
Manager:
(England) Harry Potts

Match rules

- 90 minutes
- 30 minutes of extra-time if necessary
- Replay if scores still level
