= East Lancashire derby =

Match between English football clubs Blackburn Rovers and Burnley

- Other names: Cotton Mills derby, El Lanclasico
- Location: East Lancashire
- Teams: Blackburn Rovers; Burnley
- First meeting: 27 September 1884; Burnley 2–4 Blackburn
- Latest meeting: 22 November 2026; EFL Championship; Burnley 2–2 Blackburn
- Next meeting: 7 February 2027; EFL Championship; Blackburn v Burnley
- Stadiums: Ewood Park (Blackburn); Turf Moor (Burnley)

Statistics
- Total meetings: 109
- Most wins: Burnley (45)
- Most player appearances: Jerry Dawson (Burnley); Ronnie Clayton (Blackburn) (19 each)
- All-time series: Blackburn: 41; Draws: 23; Burnley: 45
- Largest victory: Burnley 1–7 Blackburn; Football League (3 November 1888); Burnley 6–0 Blackburn; Football League (18 April 1896); Blackburn 6–0 Burnley; Football League (28 November 1914)

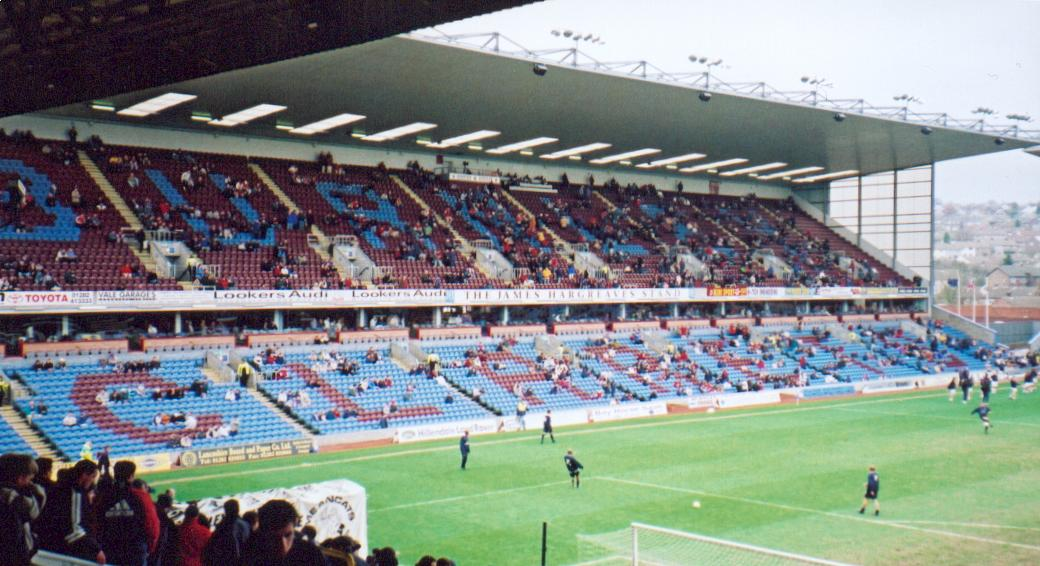
Turf Moor – home of Burnley since 1883.

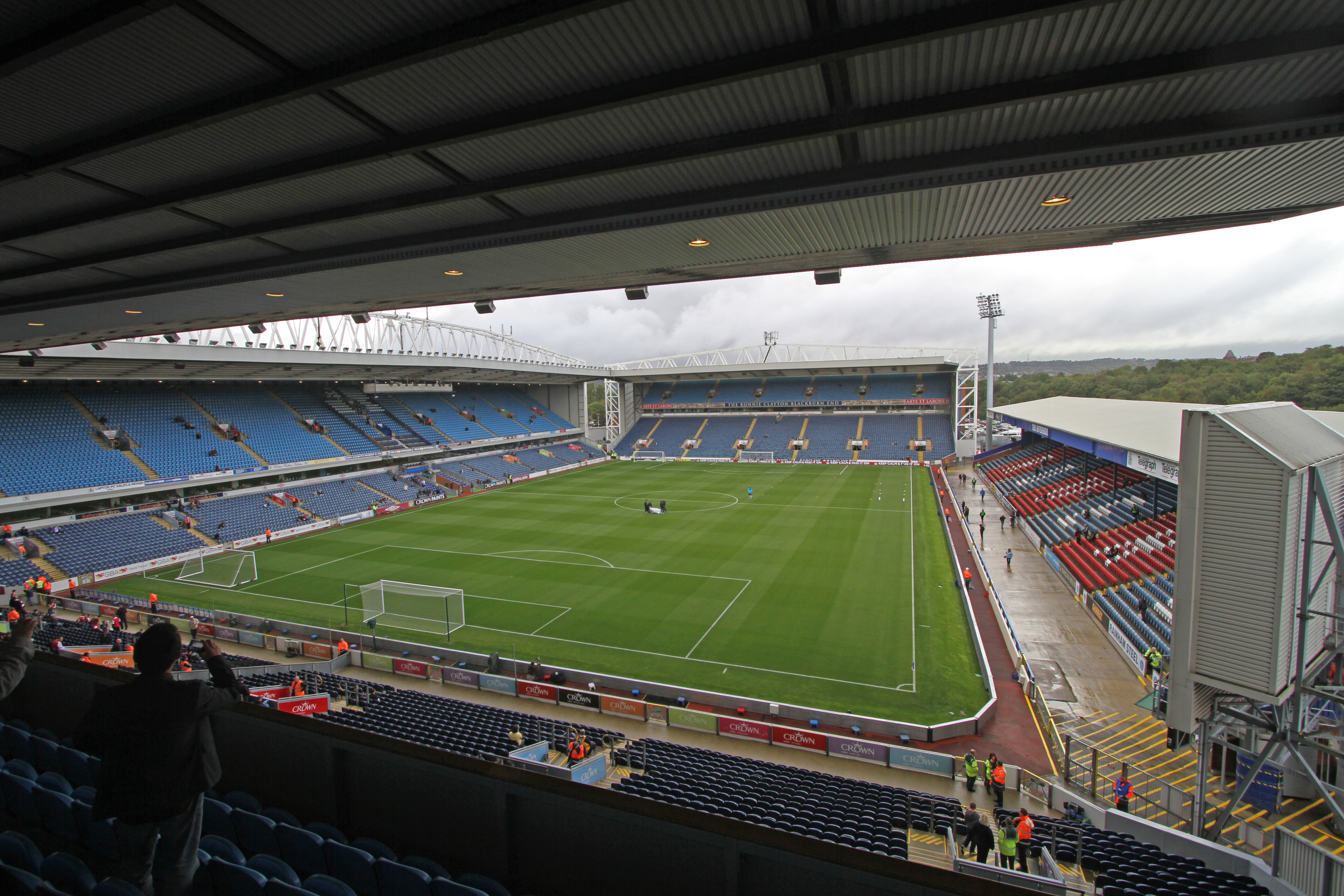
Ewood Park – home of Blackburn Rovers since 1890.

The East Lancashire derby, also known as the Cotton Mills derby, is an association football rivalry between Blackburn Rovers and Burnley. The rivalry nickname originates from the fact that both Blackburn and Burnley are former mill towns and close geographic rivals as the two Lancashire towns only lie 11 miles (18 km) apart.

Following the founding of Turton F.C. in Edgworth in 1871, several further football clubs were formed in East Lancashire over the next decade including Blackburn Rovers in 1875, Accrington in 1876 and Burnley in 1882. Rovers and Burnley played each other for the first time in September 1884 in a friendly match, with Blackburn winning 4–2. Between 1884 and 1888, the clubs met thirteen times, with Burnley winning seven matches and Rovers four. The first competitive league game between these two founder members of the Football League and former English football champions, took place at Turf Moor in November 1888, with Blackburn winning 7–1, their biggest win in the derby. Burnley's largest derby victory is a 6–0 win recorded in April 1896.

Due to the clubs routinely being in different divisions the rivalry has had periods of dormancy. After initially seeing each other on a regular basis between the 1880s and the 1930s, the clubs subsequently met only sporadically outside the 1960s and 2010s, when both sides more consistently shared a division. The clubs in total have since met over 100 times in all senior competitions, with 171 meetings in total when including historic or minor competitions. Burnley hold the better head-to-head record, as the side have won 45 games to Blackburn's 41 in major competitions, while Burnley have won 71 games to Blackburn's 65 when including matches played in regional competitions such as the Lancashire Cup.

Fans and local press have dubbed the game in recent years "El Lanclasico".

== History ==
Burnley and Blackburn Rovers met for the first time on 27 September 1884. The match was played at Burnley's home ground, Turf Moor, in front of a 5,000 crowd, with Blackburn emerging as 4–2 winners. Burnley quickly gained revenge when they won 5–1 at the same ground in March 1885. Their first meeting in Blackburn took place at Leamington Road and ended 2–2. In total, the clubs met thirteen times between 1884 and 1888, Burnley winning seven games and Blackburn four.

Blackburn Rovers and Burnley were among the 12 founder members of the Football league and took their places in the inaugural season, which was dominated by fellow Lancashire side Preston North End. The first league match between Rovers and Burnley was at Turf Moor and resulted in a 7–1 win for Blackburn. Rovers won the next season the home fixture by the same margin; Burnley remain the only team Blackburn have beaten home and away by this score line to this day. Over the first four seasons, before the league was split into two divisions, Blackburn performed the double over Burnley in each of the initial three seasons. In this period, striker Jack Southworth scored 12 goals in 10 appearances against Burnley, including Rovers' first ever league hat-trick.

Burnley recorded their first league victory over Rovers in December 1891, albeit in heavy snowy conditions and controversial circumstances. Burnley were 3–0 up at half-time at Turf Moor. After the interval, Lofthouse was sent off along with Burnley's Alec Stewart after a brief altercation, and the rest of the Rovers outfield players went with him. Only Blackburn's goalkeeper, Herbie Arthur, stayed on the pitch. Arthur appealed for offside as Burnley bore down on his goal. The referee quickly abandoned the game and the points were awarded to Burnley.

Rovers continued to have the better of the fixture, registering five consecutive wins at home ground Ewood Park between 1892 and 1897, although Burnley recorded their largest victory against Blackburn in 1895–96, when they beat Rovers 6–0 with Tom Nicol scoring a hat-trick. The clubs were temporarily parted by Burnley's relegation in 1896–97, which was assisted by Rovers completing the double over them. In March 1913, the sides met each other for the first time in the FA Cup, with Burnley winning 1–0 at Ewood Park in front of almost 43,000 spectators, including 22,000 Burnley fans.

After the First World War ended, Blackburn and Burnley played each other for 11 uninterrupted years in the top flight. Burnley experienced initial dominance, winning their first First Division title in 1920–21 and doing the double over Rovers. The mid-1920s saw three hat-tricks in two seasons by Blackburn players in the fixture, from Johnny McIntyre, Arthur Rigby and Ted Harper. Burnley were relegated to the Second Division in 1929–30. The two clubs would not meet again until Blackburn joined them in the second tier in 1935–36.

The first fixture in the Second Division ended in a goalless draw. Rovers won the return fixture 3–1, Jack Bruton scoring against his former club and again the following season. Bruton remains the only man to have scored for both clubs against the other, also having netted twice for Burnley against Rovers in the 1920s. Blackburn won the Second Division title in 1938–39, after which football was suspended during the Second World War. Burnley won promotion when the league was restarted in 1946–47 and also reached the 1947 FA Cup final. Burnley took three of the four points against Blackburn and finished third in 1947–48, while Rovers were relegated.

Blackburn returned to the top flight in 1957–58, where they would stay until 1966. Burnley won their second First Division title in 1959–60, and between 1958 and 1966, they won eight of the sixteen league meetings against Blackburn, including four successive wins at Ewood Park. Both clubs were relegated in 1970–71; Burnley went down to the second tier, while Blackburn were relegated to the third tier. Burnley returned to the First Division two years later but upon relegation in 1975–76, they rejoined Rovers who had been promoted from the Third Division in 1974–75. Burnley again had the edge in the fixture, winning four of the six matches, with midfielder Peter Noble scoring in four of the games. Rovers went down again at the end of the 1978–79 season, but bounced straight back while Burnley moved into the opposite direction entering the Third Division for the first time at the end of 1979–80. Burnley won promotion in 1981–82 to set up a renewal of the fixture. The games in 1982–83 were both won by Rovers and would ultimately prove to be the last between them in the 20th century. Simon Garner scored all three Blackburn goals in the two games, two of which came from the penalty spot.

Chart of the comparative table positions of Blackburn and Burnley in the football league.

In the following 27 years both clubs had very different fortunes. Burnley were again relegated to the Third Division at the end of the 1982–83 season, which was quickly followed by relegation to the Fourth Division in the 1984–85 season. Both clubs would stay in their respective divisions until 1991–92, when Blackburn were promoted to the newly formed Premier League and Burnley were promoted to the third tier. Burnley were promoted to the second tier in 1993–94 but were relegated the following year, while Blackburn won the Premier League title, having been bankrolled by local businessman Jack Walker.

Blackburn became the first Premier League winners to be relegated, in 1998–99, and were joined in the second tier by Burnley, who won promotion from the third tier at the end of the 1999–2000 season. The first meeting of the new millennium between them was at Turf Moor in December 2000. Rovers won 2–0, while Burnley's Kevin Ball was sent off. Blackburn also won the return fixture at Ewood Park with a scoreline of 5–0 and were promoted back to the Premier League at the end of the season.

Burnley won the Championship play-off in 2009 and were promoted to the Premier League for the first time, which also meant that the fixture would be played in the top division for the first time since January 1966. For the trip to Ewood Park, Burnley and Blackburn fans were forced to travel on designated buses. Blackburn won the first match at home, while the police made a total of 55 arrests as violence erupted inside and outside a local pub, who described the violence as one of the worst cases they had ever seen. In the buildup to the return fixture at Turf Moor, Blackburn player David Dunn said in the local newspaper that he hopes "Rovers thump Burnley 10–0", by then going on to say "I hope they stay up". Blackburn completed the double over their rivals later that season, with David Dunn scoring the only goal from the penalty spot after a dive from Martin Olsson. After the game, 150 seats in the away end were ripped up and the sinks in the toilets were smashed, with 42 arrests made involving both fan groups. Burnley were relegated at the end of the season, while Blackburn were relegated to the second tier at the end of 2011–12.

After the following three matches in the Football League Championship between both sides ended in draws, Burnley defeated Blackburn for the first time in 35 years in March 2014. At Ewood Park, Blackburn went 1–0 up but Burnley scored twice in the closing stages. Burnley were promoted to the Premier League at the end of the 2013–14 season but went down the following year. Burnley did the double over Rovers on their return to the second tier and also won the first ever League Cup meeting between both teams in 2017. Burnley also did the double over Blackburn during the 2022–23 season; after winning 3–0 at Turf Moor, Burnley defeated Rovers 1–0 at Ewood Park, claiming the Championship title at their rival's ground.

== List of derbies ==
#	Season	Date	Competition	Stadium	Home team	Result	Away team	Attendance	H2H
1	1888–89	3 November 1888	Division 1	Turf Moor	Burnley	1–7	Blackburn Rovers	3,000	+1
2	1888–89	4 February 1889	Division 1	Leamington Road	Blackburn Rovers	4–2	Burnley	2,000	+2
3	1889–90	26 October 1889	Division 1	Leamington Road	Blackburn Rovers	7–1	Burnley	4,000	+3
4	1889–90	22 February 1890	Division 1	Turf Moor	Burnley	1–2	Blackburn Rovers	7,000	+4
5	1890–91	18 October 1890	Division 1	Turf Moor	Burnley	1–6	Blackburn Rovers	10,000	+5
6	1890–91	22 November 1890	Division 1	Ewood Park	Blackburn Rovers	5–2	Burnley	4,000	+6
7	1891–92	26 September 1891	Division 1	Ewood Park	Blackburn Rovers	3–3	Burnley	4,000	+6
8	1891–92	12 December 1891	Division 1	Turf Moor	Burnley	3–0	Blackburn Rovers	5,000	+5
9	1892–93	3 December 1892	Division 1	Turf Moor	Burnley	0–0	Blackburn Rovers	10,000	+5
10	1892–93	17 December 1892	Division 1	Ewood Park	Blackburn Rovers	2–0	Burnley	7,500	+6
11	1893–94	18 November 1893	Division 1	Ewood Park	Blackburn Rovers	3–2	Burnley	5,000	+7
12	1893–94	23 December 1893	Division 1	Turf Moor	Burnley	1–0	Blackburn Rovers	13,000	+6
13	1894–95	17 November 1894	Division 1	Ewood Park	Blackburn Rovers	1–0	Burnley	7,000	+7
14	1894–95	12 January 1895	Division 1	Turf Moor	Burnley	2–1	Blackburn Rovers	10,000	+6
15	1895–96	5 October 1895	Division 1	Ewood Park	Blackburn Rovers	1–0	Burnley	3,500	+7
16	1895–96	18 April 1896	Division 1	Turf Moor	Burnley	6–0	Blackburn Rovers	5,000	+6
17	1896–97	3 October 1896	Division 1	Ewood Park	Blackburn Rovers	3–2	Burnley	9,000	+7
18	1896–97	7 November 1896	Division 1	Turf Moor	Burnley	0–1	Blackburn Rovers	5,000	+8
19	1897–98	21 April 1898	Football League test match	Ewood Park	Blackburn Rovers	1–3	Burnley	—	+7
20	1897–98	23 April 1898	Football League test match	Turf Moor	Burnley	2–0	Blackburn Rovers	—	+6
21	1898–99	26 November 1898	Division 1	Turf Moor	Burnley	2–0	Blackburn Rovers	12,000	+5
22	1898–99	26 December 1898	Division 1	Ewood Park	Blackburn Rovers	0–2	Burnley	20,000	+4
23	1899–1900	7 October 1899	Division 1	Turf Moor	Burnley	1–0	Blackburn Rovers	12,855	+3
24	1899–1900	1 January 1900	Division 1	Ewood Park	Blackburn Rovers	2–0	Burnley	14,000	+4
25	1912–13	8 March 1913	FA Cup	Ewood Park	Blackburn Rovers	0–1	Burnley	42,778	+3
26	1913–14	8 September 1913	Division 1	Turf Moor	Burnley	1–2	Blackburn Rovers	36,000	+4
27	1913–14	1 January 1914	Division 1	Ewood Park	Blackburn Rovers	0–0	Burnley	48,000	+4
28	1914–15	28 November 1914	Division 1	Ewood Park	Blackburn Rovers	6–0	Burnley	21,700	+5
29	1914–15	3 April 1915	Division 1	Turf Moor	Burnley	3–2	Blackburn Rovers	25,000	+4
30	1919–20	13 September 1919	Division 1	Ewood Park	Blackburn Rovers	2–3	Burnley	20,000	+3
31	1919–20	20 September 1919	Division 1	Turf Moor	Burnley	3–1	Blackburn Rovers	20,000	+2
32	1920–21	15 January 1921	Division 1	Turf Moor	Burnley	4–1	Blackburn Rovers	41,534	+1
33	1920–21	22 January 1921	Division 1	Ewood Park	Blackburn Rovers	1–3	Burnley	43,000	0
34	1921–22	4 February 1922	Division 1	Ewood Park	Blackburn Rovers	3–2	Burnley	20,000	+1
35	1921–22	11 February 1922	Division 1	Turf Moor	Burnley	1–2	Blackburn Rovers	40,919	+2
36	1922–23	21 October 1922	Division 1	Turf Moor	Burnley	3–1	Blackburn Rovers	29,000	+1
37	1922–23	28 October 1922	Division 1	Ewood Park	Blackburn Rovers	2–1	Burnley	23,000	+2
38	1923–24	3 November 1923	Division 1	Ewood Park	Blackburn Rovers	1–1	Burnley	20,000	+2
39	1923–24	10 November 1923	Division 1	Turf Moor	Burnley	1–2	Blackburn Rovers	30,000	+3
40	1924–25	13 September 1924	Division 1	Turf Moor	Burnley	3–5	Blackburn Rovers	16,000	+4
41	1924–25	17 January 1925	Division 1	Ewood Park	Blackburn Rovers	0–3	Burnley	20,000	+3
42	1925–26	31 October 1925	Division 1	Turf Moor	Burnley	1–3	Blackburn Rovers	26,181	+4
43	1925–26	13 March 1926	Division 1	Ewood Park	Blackburn Rovers	6–3	Burnley	26,991	+5
44	1926–27	16 October 1926	Division 1	Ewood Park	Blackburn Rovers	1–5	Burnley	21,482	+4
45	1926–27	5 March 1927	Division 1	Turf Moor	Burnley	3–1	Blackburn Rovers	18,081	+3
46	1927–28	27 August 1927	Division 1	Ewood Park	Blackburn Rovers	2–1	Burnley	32,441	+4
47	1927–28	31 December 1927	Division 1	Turf Moor	Burnley	3–1	Blackburn Rovers	28,354	+3
48	1928–29	20 October 1928	Division 1	Turf Moor	Burnley	2–2	Blackburn Rovers	35,694	+3
49	1928–29	2 May 1929	Division 1	Ewood Park	Blackburn Rovers	1–1	Burnley	5,461	+3
50	1929–30	9 November 1929	Division 1	Ewood Park	Blackburn Rovers	8–3	Burnley	22,647	+4
51	1929–30	15 March 1930	Division 1	Turf Moor	Burnley	3–2	Blackburn Rovers	16,673	+3
52	1936–37	24 October 1936	Division 2	Turf Moor	Burnley	0–0	Blackburn Rovers	32,567	+3
53	1936–37	27 February 1937	Division 2	Ewood Park	Blackburn Rovers	3–1	Burnley	18,240	+4
54	1937–38	11 December 1937	Division 2	Ewood Park	Blackburn Rovers	3–3	Burnley	15,136	+4
55	1937–38	23 April 1938	Division 2	Turf Moor	Burnley	3–1	Blackburn Rovers	14,139	+3
56	1938–39	15 October 1938	Division 2	Turf Moor	Burnley	3–2	Blackburn Rovers	29,254	+2
57	1938–39	18 February 1939	Division 2	Ewood Park	Blackburn Rovers	1–0	Burnley	30,223	+3
58	1947–48	18 October 1947	Division 1	Ewood Park	Blackburn Rovers	1–2	Burnley	41,635	+2
59	1947–48	6 March 1948	Division 1	Turf Moor	Burnley	0–0	Blackburn Rovers	44,240	+2
60	1951–52	8 March 1952	FA Cup	Ewood Park	Blackburn Rovers	3–1	Burnley	53,000	+3
61	1958–59	18 October 1958	Division 1	Turf Moor	Burnley	0–0	Blackburn Rovers	41,961	+3
62	1958–59	28 January 1959	FA Cup	Ewood Park	Blackburn Rovers	1–2	Burnley	43,752	+2
63	1958–59	7 March 1959	Division 1	Ewood Park	Blackburn Rovers	4–1	Burnley	27,071	+3
64	1959–60	17 October 1959	Division 1	Ewood Park	Blackburn Rovers	3–2	Burnley	33,316	+4
65	1959–60	5 March 1960	Division 1	Turf Moor	Burnley	1–0	Blackburn Rovers	32,331	+3
66	1959–60	12 March 1960	FA Cup	Turf Moor	Burnley	3–3	Blackburn Rovers	51,501	+3
67	1959–60	16 March 1960	FA Cup	Ewood Park	Blackburn Rovers	2–0	Burnley	53,892	+4
68	1960–61	8 October 1960	Division 1	Ewood Park	Blackburn Rovers	1–4	Burnley	26,223	+3
69	1960–61	25 February 1961	Division 1	Turf Moor	Burnley	1–1	Blackburn Rovers	26,492	+3
70	1961–62	24 February 1962	Division 1	Ewood Park	Blackburn Rovers	2–1	Burnley	33,914	+4
71	1961–62	17 April 1962	Division 1	Turf Moor	Burnley	0–1	Blackburn Rovers	29,997	+5
72	1962–63	6 October 1962	Division 1	Ewood Park	Blackburn Rovers	2–3	Burnley	26,626	+4
73	1962–63	2 April 1963	Division 1	Turf Moor	Burnley	1–0	Blackburn Rovers	25,746	+3
74	1963–64	1 October 1963	Division 1	Turf Moor	Burnley	3–0	Blackburn Rovers	24,345	+2
75	1963–64	19 October 1963	Division 1	Ewood Park	Blackburn Rovers	1–2	Burnley	26,740	+1
76	1964–65	10 October 1964	Division 1	Turf Moor	Burnley	1–1	Blackburn Rovers	21,199	+1
77	1964–65	24 February 1965	Division 1	Ewood Park	Blackburn Rovers	1–4	Burnley	15,340	0
78	1965–66	9 October 1965	Division 1	Turf Moor	Burnley	1–4	Blackburn Rovers	23,198	+1
79	1965–66	1 January 1966	Division 1	Ewood Park	Blackburn Rovers	0–2	Burnley	28,013	0
80	1976–77	7 August 1976	Anglo-Scottish Cup	Ewood Park	Blackburn Rovers	1–1	Burnley	11,012	0
81	1976–77	27 December 1976	Division 2	Ewood Park	Blackburn Rovers	2–2	Burnley	22,189	0
82	1976–77	8 April 1977	Division 2	Turf Moor	Burnley	3–1	Blackburn Rovers	17,372	+1
83	1977–78	2 August 1977	Anglo-Scottish Cup	Turf Moor	Burnley	2–1	Blackburn Rovers	8,119	+2
84	1977–78	26 December 1977	Division 2	Turf Moor	Burnley	2–3	Blackburn Rovers	27,427	+1
85	1977–78	27 March 1978	Division 2	Ewood Park	Blackburn Rovers	0–1	Burnley	24,379	+2
86	1978–79	12 August 1978	Anglo-Scottish Cup	Ewood Park	Blackburn Rovers	1–1	Burnley	9,791	+2
87	1978–79	26 December 1978	Division 2	Turf Moor	Burnley	2–1	Blackburn Rovers	23,133	+3
88	1978–79	14 April 1979	Division 2	Ewood Park	Blackburn Rovers	1–2	Burnley	14,761	+4
89	1979–80	4 August 1979	Anglo-Scottish Cup	Ewood Park	Blackburn Rovers	2–2	Burnley	7,749	+4
90	1982–83	27 December 1982	Division 2	Turf Moor	Burnley	0–1	Blackburn Rovers	20,439	+3
91	1982–83	4 April 1983	Division 2	Ewood Park	Blackburn Rovers	2–1	Burnley	13,434	+2
92	2000–01	17 December 2000	Division 1 (2nd tier)	Turf Moor	Burnley	0–2	Blackburn Rovers	21,369	+1
93	2000–01	1 April 2001	Division 1 (2nd tier)	Ewood Park	Blackburn Rovers	5–0	Burnley	23,442	0
94	2004–05	20 February 2005	FA Cup	Turf Moor	Burnley	0–0	Blackburn Rovers	21,468	0
95	2004–05	1 March 2005	FA Cup	Ewood Park	Blackburn Rovers	2–1	Burnley	28,691	+1
96	2009–10	18 October 2009	Premier League	Ewood Park	Blackburn Rovers	3–2	Burnley	26,689	+2
97	2009–10	28 March 2010	Premier League	Turf Moor	Burnley	0–1	Blackburn Rovers	21,546	+3
98	2012–13	2 December 2012	Championship	Turf Moor	Burnley	1–1	Blackburn Rovers	21,341	+3
99	2012–13	17 March 2013	Championship	Ewood Park	Blackburn Rovers	1–1	Burnley	20,735	+3
100	2013–14	14 September 2013	Championship	Turf Moor	Burnley	1–1	Blackburn Rovers	15,699	+3
101	2013–14	9 March 2014	Championship	Ewood Park	Blackburn Rovers	1–2	Burnley	21,589	+2
102	2015–16	24 October 2015	Championship	Ewood Park	Blackburn Rovers	0–1	Burnley	19,897	+1
103	2015–16	5 March 2016	Championship	Turf Moor	Burnley	1–0	Blackburn Rovers	20,478	0
104	2017–18	23 August 2017	League Cup	Ewood Park	Blackburn Rovers	0–2	Burnley	16,313	+1
105	2022–23	13 November 2022	Championship	Turf Moor	Burnley	3–0	Blackburn Rovers	21,747	+2
106	2022–23	25 April 2023	Championship	Ewood Park	Blackburn Rovers	0–1	Burnley	18,166	+3
107	2024–25	31 August 2024	Championship	Turf Moor	Burnley	1–1	Blackburn Rovers	21,042	+3
108	2024–25	4 January 2025	Championship	Ewood Park	Blackburn Rovers	0–1	Burnley	25,909	+4
109	2026–27	22 November 2026	Championship	Turf Moor	Burnley	2–2	Blackburn Rovers		+4
110	2026–27	7 February 2027	Championship	Ewood Park	Blackburn Rovers		Burnley		+

Note: excluding games played during the First and Second World Wars

=== Head-to-head ===
As of 22 November 2026

Competition	Games played	Blackburn wins	Drawn games	Burnley wins
Football League and Premier League	97	38	18	41
FA Cup	7	3	2	2
League Cup	1	0	0	1
Anglo-Scottish Cup	4	0	3	1
Totals	109	41	23	45

=== Regional competitions ===
#	Season	Date	Competition	Stadium	Home team	Result	Away team
1	1889–90	26 April 1890	Lancashire Cup final	Thorneyholme Road (Accrington)	Blackburn Rovers	0–2	Burnley
2	1890–91	30 May 1891	East Lancashire Charity Cup final	Ewood Park	Blackburn Rovers	3–2	Burnley
3	1892–93	20 April 1893	East Lancashire Charity Cup semi-final	Ewood Park	Blackburn Rovers	0–2	Burnley
4	1893–94	24 September 1894	East Lancashire Charity Cup final	Ewood Park	Blackburn Rovers	0–3	Burnley
5	1894–95	9 March 1895	County Palatine League	Turf Moor	Burnley	0–1	Blackburn Rovers
6	1894–95	8 April 1895	County Palatine League	Ewood Park	Blackburn Rovers	4–3	Burnley
7	1895–96	14 March 1896	Lancashire Cup semi-final	Deepdale (Preston)	Blackburn Rovers	1–1	Burnley
8	1895–96	19 March 1896	Lancashire Cup semi-final replay	Hyde Road (Manchester)	Blackburn Rovers	2–1	Burnley
9	1898–99	24 April 1899	East Lancashire Charity Cup final	Ewood Park	Blackburn Rovers	2–3	Burnley
10	1900–01	14 January 1901	Lancashire Cup final	Hyde Road (Manchester)	Blackburn Rovers	4–0	Burnley
11	1901–02	2 December 1901	Lancashire Cup final	Hyde Road (Manchester)	Blackburn Rovers	1–0	Burnley
12	1902–03	20 October 1902	Lancashire Cup	Turf Moor	Burnley	1–2	Blackburn Rovers
13	1904–05	24 April 1905	East Lancashire Charity Cup final	Turf Moor	Burnley	3–0	Blackburn Rovers
14	1905–06	26 April 1906	East Lancashire Charity Cup final	Turf Moor	Burnley	2–2	Blackburn Rovers
15	1906–07	15 April 1907	East Lancashire Charity Cup semi-final	Turf Moor	Burnley	3–1	Blackburn Rovers
16	1907–08	30 April 1908	East Lancashire Charity Cup final	Turf Moor	Burnley	4–2	Blackburn Rovers
17	1908–09	27 April 1909	East Lancashire Charity Cup	Turf Moor	Burnley	3–6	Blackburn Rovers
18	1910–11	7 November 1910	East Lancashire Charity Cup final	Turf Moor	Burnley	0–1	Blackburn Rovers
19	1910–11	12 December 1910	Lancashire Cup final	Ewood Park	Blackburn Rovers	1–1	Burnley
20	1910–11	23 January 1911	Lancashire Cup final replay	Turf Moor	Burnley	2–2	Blackburn Rovers
21	1910–11	3 April 1911	Lancashire Cup final second replay	Burnden Park (Bolton)	Blackburn Rovers	0–0	Burnley
22	1910–11	18 April 1911	Lancashire Cup final third replay	Ewood Park	Blackburn Rovers	2–1	Burnley
23	1911–12	20 November 1911	Lancashire Cup semi-final	Ewood Park	Blackburn Rovers	1–3	Burnley
24	1911–12	27 November 1911	East Lancashire Charity Cup final	Turf Moor	Burnley	1–0	Blackburn Rovers
25	1912–13	22 September 1913	East Lancashire Charity Cup semi-final	Ewood Park	Blackburn Rovers	0–0	Burnley
26	1912–13	19 January 1914	East Lancashire Charity Cup semi-final replay	Turf Moor	Burnley	2–4	Blackburn Rovers
27	1913–14	6 October 1913	Lancashire Cup	Turf Moor	Burnley	3–0	Blackburn Rovers
28	1914–15	9 November 1914	Lancashire Cup semi-final	Turf Moor	Burnley	2–1	Blackburn Rovers
29	1914–15	24 April 1915	East Lancashire Charity Cup final	Turf Moor	Burnley	2–0	Blackburn Rovers
30	1919–20	3 May 1920	East Lancashire Charity Cup	Turf Moor	Burnley	1–0	Blackburn Rovers
31	1919–20	6 May 1920	East Lancashire Charity Cup	Ewood Park	Blackburn Rovers	1–2	Burnley
32	1920–21	18 April 1921	East Lancashire Charity Cup	Turf Moor	Burnley	6–2	Blackburn Rovers
33	1920–21	27 April 1921	East Lancashire Charity Cup	Ewood Park	Blackburn Rovers	0–2	Burnley
34	1921–22	24 April 1922	East Lancashire Charity Cup	Turf Moor	Burnley	5–1	Blackburn Rovers
35	1921–22	1 May 1922	East Lancashire Charity Cup	Ewood Park	Blackburn Rovers	2–1	Burnley
36	1922–23	23 April 1923	East Lancashire Charity Cup	Ewood Park	Blackburn Rovers	1–0	Burnley
37	1922–23	1 May 1923	East Lancashire Charity Cup	Turf Moor	Burnley	1–0	Blackburn Rovers
38	1922–23	7 May 1923	East Lancashire Charity Cup replay	Ewood Park	Blackburn Rovers	2–0	Burnley
39	1923–24	5 September 1923	East Lancashire Charity Cup	Turf Moor	Burnley	2–0	Blackburn Rovers
40	1923–24	10 September 1923	East Lancashire Charity Cup	Ewood Park	Blackburn Rovers	2–0	Burnley
41	1923–24	23 April 1924	East Lancashire Charity Cup replay	Ewood Park	Blackburn Rovers	1–1	Burnley
42	1925–26	3 May 1926	East Lancashire Charity Cup	Ewood Park	Blackburn Rovers	2–1	Burnley
43	1926–27	8 September 1926	East Lancashire Charity Cup	Turf Moor	Burnley	1–3	Blackburn Rovers
44	1926–27	5 May 1927	East Lancashire Charity Cup	Ewood Park	Blackburn Rovers	4–0	Burnley
45	1927–28	17 November 1927	East Lancashire Charity Cup	Ewood Park	Blackburn Rovers	1–1	Burnley
46	1927–28	22 November 1927	East Lancashire Charity Cup	Turf Moor	Burnley	3–3	Blackburn Rovers
47	1928–29	15 November 1928	East Lancashire Charity Cup	Ewood Park	Blackburn Rovers	4–0	Burnley
48	1928–29	22 April 1929	East Lancashire Charity Cup	Turf Moor	Burnley	2–1	Blackburn Rovers
49	1935–36	30 September 1935	Lancashire Cup	Ewood Park	Blackburn Rovers	1–0	Burnley
50	1950–51	24 October 1950	Lancashire Cup	Turf Moor	Burnley	3–1	Blackburn Rovers
51	1951–52	24 April 1952	Lancashire Cup semi-final	Turf Moor	Burnley	1–0	Blackburn Rovers
52	1957–58	12 November 1957	Lancashire Cup	Turf Moor	Burnley	4–0	Blackburn Rovers
53	1960–61	25 April 1961	Lancashire Cup final	Turf Moor	Burnley	1–0	Blackburn Rovers
54	1961–62	30 April 1962	Lancashire Cup semi-final	Turf Moor	Burnley	3–2	Blackburn Rovers
55	1966–67	1 November 1966	Lancashire Cup	Ewood Park	Blackburn Rovers	0–0	Burnley
56	1966–67	7 March 1967	Lancashire Cup replay	Turf Moor	Burnley	0–2	Blackburn Rovers
57	1983–84	16 August 1983	Lancashire Cup	Turf Moor	Burnley	1–1	Blackburn Rovers
58	1985–86	13 August 1985	Lancashire Cup final	Ewood Park	Blackburn Rovers	1–0	Burnley
59	1987–88	4 August 1987	Lancashire Cup	Turf Moor	Burnley	2–1	Blackburn Rovers
60	1988–89	9 August 1988	Lancashire Cup	Turf Moor	Burnley	1–3	Blackburn Rovers
61	1989–90	8 August 1989	Lancashire Cup	Turf Moor	Burnley	0–2	Blackburn Rovers
62	1991–92	6 August 1991	Lancashire Cup	Turf Moor	Burnley	1–1	Blackburn Rovers

Note: excluding games played during the First and Second World Wars
Note: teams have fielded their reserve teams in the Lancashire Cup since the mid-1990s

=== Regional competitions head-to-head ===
Competition	Games played	Blackburn wins	Drawn games	Burnley wins
Lancashire Cup	27	10	7	10
East Lancashire Charity Cup	33	12	5	16
County Palatine League	2	2	0	0
Totals	62	24	12	26

=== Total head-to-head ===
Competition	Games played	Blackburn wins	Drawn games	Burnley wins
Major competitions	109	41	23	45
Regional competitions	62	24	12	26
Totals	171	65	35	71

== Honours ==
Team	First Division / Premier League	Second Division / Championship	Third Division / League One	Fourth Division / League Two	FA Cup	League Cup	FA Community/Charity Shield	Anglo-Scottish Cup (defunct)	Full Members' Cup (defunct)	Total
Blackburn Rovers	3	1	1	0	6	1	1	0	1	14
Burnley	2	4	1	1	1	0	2	1	0	12

== Crossing the divide ==
Jack Bruton is the only man to score for both sides against the other. At Burnley, he scored 44 goals in 176 matches before Rovers broke their transfer record by paying £6,500 in 1929. Bruton would make 344 appearances for Blackburn, scoring 115 goals and also managed the club for a short period in the late 1940s.

In the 1950s and 1960s, a few Burnley players moved to Blackburn Rovers. These included goalkeeper Adam Blacklaw, defender Walter Joyce and winger John Connelly. Blacklaw, a Scottish international, played 374 matches for Burnley and 110 games for Rovers. Connelly won the First Division with Burnley in 1960 and moved to Manchester United in 1964. He scored 103 goals in 260 matches for Burnley, including five against Blackburn. Connelly made 20 appearances for the England national team and was a member of their World Cup squad in 1966. After the tournament, he moved to Blackburn, where he played 110 games.

Full-back Keith Newton, a youth product of Blackburn Rovers, played 357 times for the side before he joined Everton in 1969. After three years, he switched to Burnley in 1972 and won promotion to the top flight with the club in 1973. He played a combined record number of 593 occasions for Blackburn and Burnley in the league and cup. Another full-back to make the move from Turf Moor to Ewood Park via another club, Leeds United, was Kevin Hird. Converted to a midfielder at Burnley, Hird – a lifelong Burnley supporter – netted for Rovers against Burnley on Boxing Day in 1978.

In the early 2000s, two Blackburn players had loan spells at Burnley, these being Jay McEveley and Andy Todd. David May, who played for Blackburn between 1988 and 1994, captained Burnley in his only season there in 2003–04. Another ex-Blackburn player, Alan Mahon, joined Burnley in 2006, although he had a spell at Wigan Athletic in between. Mahon's Blackburn debut had come as a substitute against Burnley at Turf Moor in December 2000. Andy Cole, who signed for Rovers for a then club-record £8 million in 2001, spent six months on loan from Sunderland at Burnley towards the end of his career in 2008.

In 2016, Owen Coyle became the new manager of Blackburn Rovers and became the first person to manage Blackburn and Burnley, where he was appointed from 2007 to 2010.

== Pranks ==
In the 1990–91 season, Burnley were eliminated by Torquay United in the Fourth Division play-off semi-final. After the match, a plane flew over Turf Moor with a banner saying "Staying down forever luv Rovers Ha Ha Ha". This prank has largely been attributed to former Blackburn striker Simon Garner, although he denies this, but does claim to know who was responsible. The Burnley fans gained some revenge in 1994, after Blackburn Rovers were beaten by Swedish semi-professional team Trelleborgs FF in the UEFA Cup. The Burnley supporters changed a road sign to 'twin' Burnley with Trelleborg.

For the match at Burnley during the 2009–10 season, Blackburn Rovers fans wore Owen Coyle masks to wind the Burnley fans up as Coyle had left Burnley for Bolton Wanderers. In the lead up to the return fixture in March 2010, the police allegedly foiled a plot by Burnley fans to paint Blackburn midfielder David Dunn's house claret and blue. In May 2012, during Blackburn's home game against Wigan Athletic, Burnley supporters arranged a plane to fly over Ewood Park which read — In Venky's we trust-Burnley SU. Rovers lost the fixture 1–0 and were subsequently relegated from the Premier League. In 2014, at a Championship fixture at Ewood Park, Burnley beat their rivals for the first time in 35 years. Forty minutes into the first half, a plane flew overhead with a banner that read: "35yrs who cares? Venkys 4ever".

In 2013, Burnley fan James McDonough applied for the vacant managers position at Ewood Park after manager Michael Appleton was sacked after the 1–1 draw with Burnley. McDonough made the shortlist for the managers job with some of the shortest odds with the online bookmakers including BetVictor. His intentions as manager included "Bringing back the derby with Accrington Stanley" and "relegating the club within two seasons!" The spoof received mass coverage on national news and social media.

In 2015, a sponge inside a Blackburn Rovers birthday cake was found to bear the colours of Burnley; it was discovered that the maker was a Burnley fan. The prank received further coverage on an episode of Judge Rinder, with the Blackburn supporter losing the case for compensation.

== Women ==
In September 2025, Burnley Women and Blackburn Rovers Women met in the FA Women's National League Cup, with Burnley winning 13–0. Charlie Chadwick scored a hat-trick, and she was one of nine different Burnley players on the scoresheet. Both teams played each other again the following month in the Women's FA Cup first round. Burnley defeated Rovers by 12 goals to 0, with Claudia Walker netting a hat-trick and being one of nine different players on the scoresheet.

#	Season	Date	Competition	Stadium	Home team	Result	Away team	Attendance	H2H
1	2025–26	28 September 2025	FA Women's National League Cup	Shawbridge (Clitheroe)	Blackburn Rovers	0–13	Burnley	358	+1
2	2025–26	26 October 2025	Women's FA Cup	Daisy Arena (Nelson)	Burnley	12–0	Blackburn Rovers	—N/a	+2
