= Lancashire derby =

Lancashire derby may refer to:

- East Lancashire derby, a football match between Blackburn Rovers F.C. and Burnley F.C.
- West Lancashire derby, a football match between Blackpool F.C. and Preston North End F.C.
