= Jimmy Adamson =

English footballer and manager (1929–2011)

Personal information
- Full name: James Adamson
- Date of birth: 4 April 1929
- Place of birth: Ashington, Northumberland, England
- Date of death: 8 November 2011 (aged 82)
- Place of death: Nelson, Lancashire, England
- Position: Right-half

Senior career*
| Years | Team | Apps | (Gls) |
| 1947–1964 | Burnley | 426 | (17) |

International career
| 1953 | England B | 1 | (0) |

Managerial career
- 1970–1976: Burnley
- 1976: Sparta Rotterdam
- 1976–1978: Sunderland
- 1978–1980: Leeds United
- * Club domestic league appearances and goals

James Adamson (4 April 1929 – 8 November 2011) was an English professional footballer and football manager. He was born in Ashington, Northumberland. He made 486 appearances for Burnley, ranking him sixth in their all-time appearance list.

== Playing career ==
Adamson, a right-half, joined Burnley in January 1947 after playing non-league football in his native Ashington and working as a miner. His early career was interrupted by national service, which he completed with the Royal Air Force, meaning his debut had to wait until February 1951, when Burnley played away to Bolton Wanderers. He played once for the England B team, but never made the full England side.

He was an ever-present as Burnley won the First Division in 1959–60 and captained the side to the 1962 FA Cup Final which they lost against Tottenham Hotspur. He was also named Footballer of the Year in 1962.

Adamson formed a midfield partnership with inside-forward Jimmy McIlroy, around which much of Burnley's creative play was centred.

== Coaching career ==
He retired in 1964, having played 426 league games, and joined the Burnley coaching staff. He had previously coached the England team in the 1962 World Cup in Chile and was the Football Association's preferred choice of manager ahead of Alf Ramsey but declined the offer.

In February 1970, when Burnley manager Harry Potts was made general manager, Adamson stepped up to become team manager. Burnley were relegated at the end his first full season in charge, but returned to the top-flight in 1973, winning the Second Division title.

Burnley were relegated again in 1976, although Adamson had already left that January. In May 1976 he was appointed as manager of Dutch side Sparta Rotterdam, but left the following month. In November 1976 he was made manager of Sunderland, but was unable to prevent them from relegation from the First Division.

He left Sunderland in October 1978, taking over from Jock Stein as manager of Leeds United. Adamson guided Leeds to 5th place in the First Division and a League Cup semi-final in his first season. However, his reign saw the departure of popular players like Tony Currie and Frank Gray and Leeds could only finish 11th in 1979–80. Amidst growing fan criticism, Adamson resigned in October 1980. He then took no further part in professional football and spent the rest of his life in Burnley.

Adamson died on 8 November 2011, aged 82.

On 1 August 2013, his biography, written by Dave Thomas, was published.

== Honours ==
Burnley

- Football League First Division: 1959–60
- FA Cup runner-up: 1961–62

== See also ==
- List of one-club men
