= Trevor Meredith =

English footballer

Personal information
- Full name: Trevor George Meredith
- Date of birth: 25 December 1936 (age 89)
- Place of birth: Stottesdon, England
- Position: Winger

Senior career*
Years	Team	Apps	(Gls)
1957–1964	Burnley	37	(8)
1964–1972	Shrewsbury Town	235	(41)
- * Club domestic league appearances and goals

Trevor George Meredith (born 25 December 1936) is an English retired professional footballer who played as a winger. Whilst playing for Burnley, he scored the winning goal in the 2–1 victory over Manchester City on 2 May 1960, a win which saw the Clarets crowned Champions of England for the first time since 1921. After leaving Burnley, he went on to play over 200 league games for Shrewsbury Town.

== Personal life ==
Meredith was born on 25 December 1936 in the village of Stottesdon, near Bridgnorth, Shropshire. He was conscripted into the British Army at the age of 17, and was playing semi-professional football for Kidderminster Harriers when he was scouted by Burnley. After retiring from playing, he became a primary school teacher at Our Lady and St. Edwards RC Primary School in Preston.

== Playing career ==
=== Burnley ===
Meredith's footballing career started his career when he signed as a part-time player for then Southern Football League side Kidderminster Harriers in the mid-1950s whilst on National Service. His performances for Kidderminster attracted clubs in the Football League and in 1957, he was offered a trial by Football League First Division side Burnley. His trial period was successful and he signed his first professional contract with the Lancashire club.

Meredith spent the entirety of his first two seasons in the reserves at Burnley thanks to the strength of the playing staff. His break into the first team came towards the end of the 1959–60 season when he was called upon by manager Harry Potts because regular winger John Connelly was on England international duty. He made his debut for the Clarets in the 1–0 victory away at Nottingham Forest on 9 April 1960. Thanks to an injury suffered by Connelly while playing for England, Meredith kept his place in the side for the following match at home to Leicester City. He scored his first senior goal in that game, and went on to play seven of the final eight games of the season, as Burnley closed in on the First Division championship despite not having topped the table all season.

Meredith's most important moment at Burnley came on 2 May 1960, when he was selected to play in the final match of the 1959–60 season. Burnley needed to beat Manchester City at Maine Road to win the title. Brian Pilkington put Burnley into the lead early in the first half, but Joe Hayes equalised for City soon after. In the 30th minute of the match, Meredith scored the goal which gave Burnley a 2–1 victory, and the English championship for only the second time. However, despite scoring the winning goal Meredith was not awarded a league winners' medal because Football League rules meant the team were only given eleven, and as a reserve Meredith was not eligible to receive one. This was rectified in 2026, before a game between the two clubs at Turf Moor that the visitors won 0-1, Meridith, now 89, was presented with his league winners medal

He returned to the reserves at the beginning of the following season, and although he continued to play for Burnley for three further seasons after their Championship winning campaign, he played a total of just 37 league games for Burnley, scoring eight goals.

=== Shrewsbury Town ===
In the summer of 1964, Meredith signed for Football League Third Division side Shrewsbury Town. In contrast to his time at Burnley, he was a regular first-team player for the Shrews and went on to play 235 games in the league for the club, in which he scored 41 times.
