= Stan Cullis =

English footballer and manager (1916–2001)

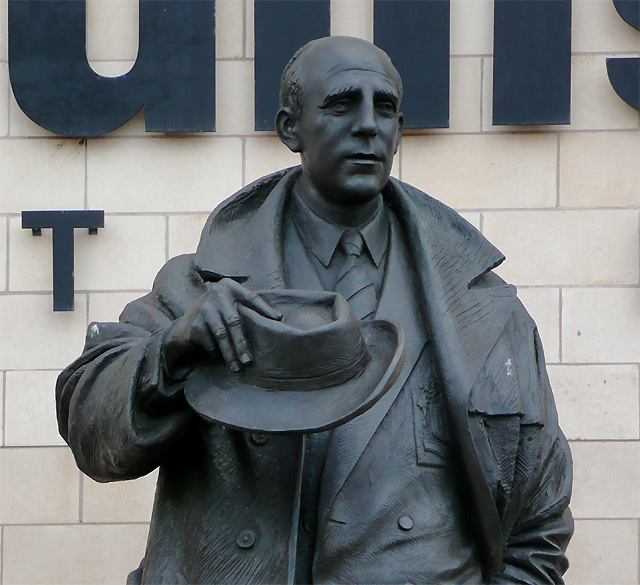
- Statue of Stan Cullis outside Wolves' Molineux Stadium

Personal information
- Full name: Stanley Cullis
- Date of birth: 25 October 1916
- Place of birth: Ellesmere Port, England
- Date of death: 28 February 2001 (aged 84)
- Place of death: Malvern, England
- Position: Centre half

Youth career
- 1930–1933: Ellesmere Port Wednesday

Senior career*
| Years | Team | Apps | (Gls) |
| 1934–1947 | Wolverhampton Wanderers | 152 | (2) |
| 1943 | → Gillingham (wartime guest) | | |

International career
| 1937–1939 | England | 12 | (0) |

Managerial career
- 1948–1964: Wolverhampton Wanderers
- 1965–1970: Birmingham City
- * Club domestic league appearances and goals

Stanley Cullis (25 October 1916 – 28 February 2001) was an English professional footballer and manager, primarily for Wolverhampton Wanderers.

During his term as manager between 1948 and 1964, Wolves became one of the strongest teams in the English game, winning the league title on three occasions, and playing a series of high-profile friendly matches against top European sides which acted as a precursor to the European Cup.

== Playing career ==
Cullis joined Wolverhampton Wanderers as a teenager after a trial at Bolton Wanderers, signing professionally within a week of his arrival. He quickly moved up through the youth and reserve ranks and made his senior debut on 16 February 1935 in a 2–3 defeat at Huddersfield Town. He had to wait until the 1936–37 season though before he became first choice, when he replaced Bill Morris, and swiftly became club captain.

Cullis led the team to become one of the top teams in England, finishing runners-up in the league in 1937–38 and 1938–39. In 1939 Wolves had the chance to win The Double, but with only 5 wins in the last 11 matches the team lost the championship by 5 points to Everton. They reached the FA Cup Final but lost 4–1 to Portsmouth, thus becoming the third English club to finish as runners-up in both League and FA Cup.

He won a call-up to the England team and made his international debut on 23 October 1937 in a 5–1 success against Ireland. Because of the outbreak of the war, he won only 12 full caps (once as captain), although he also played in 20 wartime internationals (10 as captain).

England played Germany in Berlin on 14 May 1938. The England players were directed pre-match that on the pitch during the German national anthem, they should give a Nazi salute. With similarities to Jack Kirby in 1934, Cullis refused. After Cullis responded, "Count me out", the only player to refuse, he was dropped from the team. His place went to Alf Young of Huddersfield. England won the match 6–3.

During the conflict, he served as a PT instructor in both Britain and Italy, and also managed 34 wartime appearances for Wolves in regional competitions, as well as guesting for Aldershot, Fulham and Liverpool. Shortly after, he also managed briefly Fredrikstad in 1946.

When competitive football resumed in England in 1946–47, Cullis played just one more season for Wolves, in which the club once again narrowly missed out on a first league title. He then announced his retirement as a result of injury and was appointed assistant to manager Ted Vizard, after having made 171 appearances in total for the club.

== Management career ==
In June 1948, aged just 31, Cullis became manager of Wolverhampton Wanderers and presided over the most successful era in the club's history. In his first season in charge, he became the youngest manager to win the FA Cup at Wembley as Wolves beat Leicester City to win their first major trophy since 1908. Five years later Wolves overhauled local rivals West Bromwich Albion to win their first league title.

Cullis's team restored some pride to English football after the national team's thrashings at the hands of Hungary when they beat the star-studded Honvéd side in a 1954 friendly, and Cullis's comments that his team were "champions of the world" played a large part in the formation of European club competitions. They also played Moscow Spartak, Dynamo and Real Madrid (1957) in other floodlit friendlies.

Cullis led Wolves to two more league titles, in 1957–58 and 1958–59, and they narrowly missed the hat-trick in 1959–60, losing by one point to Burnley, while also winning the FA Cup again in 1960 to seal their position as one of the dominant teams of the era. The 1960s saw Wolves begin to struggle, and Cullis was surprisingly sacked in September 1964, declaring that he would not work in football again, despite offers from Toronto City and Juventus.

After a short spell working as a sales representative, he did return to the game as manager of Birmingham City in December 1965, but could not reproduce the success he had enjoyed at Wolves. Cullis retired from football in March 1970, and took up a post with a travel agency in Malvern, his adopted home town.

== Later life ==
Cullis died on 28 February 2001 at the age of 84.

Tributes to Cullis include the naming of a stand (the Stan Cullis Stand) at Wolves' Molineux Stadium and a statue of him outside it; in 2003 he was inducted into the English Football Hall of Fame in recognition of his impact as a manager.

== Bill Shankly tribute ==
In his 1976 autobiography, Bill Shankly paid high tribute to Cullis, saying: "While Stan [Cullis] was volatile and outrageous in what he said, he never swore. And he could be as soft as mash. He would give you his last penny. Stan was 100 per cent Wolverhampton. His blood must have been of old gold. He would have died for Wolverhampton. Above all, Stan is a very clever man who could have been successful at anything. When he left Wolverhampton, I think his heart was broken and he thought the whole world had come down on top of him. All round, as a player, as a manager, and for general intelligence, it would be difficult to name anyone since the game began who could qualify to be in the same class as Stan Cullis."

== Career statistics ==
| Club performance | | | League | | Cup | | Total | |
| Season | Club | League | Apps | Goals | Apps | Goals | Apps | Goals |
| England | | | League | | FA Cup | | Total | |
|---|---|---|---|---|---|---|---|---|
| 1934–35 | Wolverhampton Wanderers | First Division | 3 | 0 | 0 | 0 | 3 | 0 |
| 1935–36 | Wolverhampton Wanderers | First Division | 12 | 0 | 0 | 0 | 12 | 0 |
| 1936–37 | Wolverhampton Wanderers | First Division | 24 | 1 | 7 | 0 | 31 | 1 |
| 1937–38 | Wolverhampton Wanderers | First Division | 36 | 0 | 2 | 0 | 38 | 0 |
| 1938–39 | Wolverhampton Wanderers | First Division | 40 | 1 | 6 | 0 | 46 | 1 |
| 1939–40 | Wolverhampton Wanderers | First Division | 0 | 0 | 0 | 0 | 0 | 0 |
| 1946–47 | Wolverhampton Wanderers | First Division | 37 | 0 | 3 | 0 | 40 | 0 |
| Career total | | | 152 | 2 | 18 | 0 | 170 | 2 |

=== Managerial statistics ===
| Season | League | | | | | | | | | FA Cup | FA Charity Shield | Europe |
| Season | Division | P | W | D | L | F | A | Pts | Pos | FA Cup | FA Charity Shield | Europe |
|---|---|---|---|---|---|---|---|---|---|---|---|---|
| 1948–49 | First Division | 42 | 17 | 12 | 13 | 79 | 66 | 46 | 6th | W | | |
| 1949–50 | First Division | 42 | 20 | 13 | 9 | 76 | 49 | 53 | 2nd | R5 | Shared | |
| 1950–51 | First Division | 42 | 15 | 8 | 19 | 74 | 61 | 38 | 14th | SF | | |
| 1951–52 | First Division | 42 | 12 | 14 | 16 | 73 | 73 | 38 | 16th | R4 | | |
| 1952–53 | First Division | 42 | 19 | 13 | 10 | 86 | 63 | 51 | 3rd | R3 | | |
| 1953–54 | First Division | 42 | 25 | 7 | 10 | 96 | 56 | 57 | 1st | R3 | | |
| 1954–55 | First Division | 42 | 19 | 10 | 13 | 89 | 70 | 48 | 2nd | QF | Shared | |
| 1955–56 | First Division | 42 | 20 | 9 | 13 | 89 | 65 | 49 | 3rd | R3 | | |
| 1956–57 | First Division | 42 | 20 | 8 | 14 | 94 | 70 | 48 | 6th | R4 | | |
| 1957–58 | First Division | 42 | 28 | 8 | 6 | 103 | 47 | 64 | 1st | QF | | |
| 1958–59 | First Division | 42 | 28 | 5 | 9 | 110 | 49 | 61 | 1st | R4 | R/U | European Cup R2 |
| 1959–60 | First Division | 42 | 24 | 6 | 12 | 106 | 67 | 54 | 2nd | W | W | European Cup QF |
| 1960–61 | First Division | 42 | 25 | 7 | 10 | 103 | 75 | 57 | 3rd | R3 | Shared | European Cup Winners' Cup SF |
| 1961–62 | First Division | 42 | 13 | 10 | 19 | 73 | 86 | 36 | 18th | R4 | | |
| 1962–63 | First Division | 42 | 20 | 10 | 12 | 93 | 65 | 50 | 5th | R3 | | |
| 1963–64 | First Division | 42 | 12 | 15 | 15 | 70 | 80 | 39 | 16th | R3 | | |

== Honours ==
=== As a player ===
Wolverhampton Wanderers

- FA Cup runner-up: 1938–39

=== As a manager ===
Wolverhampton Wanderers

- Football League First Division: 1953–54, 1957–58, 1958–59
- FA Cup: 1948–49, 1959–60
- FA Charity Shield: 1949 (shared), 1954 (shared), 1959, 1960 (shared)
- FA Youth Cup: 1958; runner-up: 1953, 1954, 1962

== See also ==
- List of English football championship-winning managers
