= Billy White =

English footballer

Personal information
- Full name: William Henry White
- Date of birth: 13 October 1936
- Place of birth: Liverpool, England
- Date of death: 7 December 2000 (aged 64)
- Place of death: Ormskirk, England
- Height: 5 ft 10 in (1.78 m)
- Position: Forward

Youth career
- Clubmoor Boys' Club

Senior career*
Years	Team	Apps	(Gls)
1954–1961	Burnley	9	(4)
1961	Wrexham	8	(0)
1961–1962	Chester	13	(3)
1962–?	Halifax Town	0	(0)
- * Club domestic league appearances and goals

William White (13 October 1936 – 7 December 2000) was an English footballer.

== Playing career ==
White joined Burnley from the Liverpool based Clubmoor Boys' Club in 1954, going on to score four times in his nine league outings for the Clarets. His spell included six appearances during 1959–60, when Burnley were champions of the Football League First Division.

In March 1961 he moved to Wrexham, but four months later he switched to local rivals Chester. The following year he joined Halifax Town but he did not make any more appearances in The Football League.

After the end of his football career, White ran a newsagent shop in Liverpool with his wife Winifred. He died in Ormskirk District General Hospital in December 2000 after contracting MRSA. Burnley flew their flag at half-mast as a mark of respect following his death.
