= Jim Finney =

English football referee (1924–2008)

James Finney
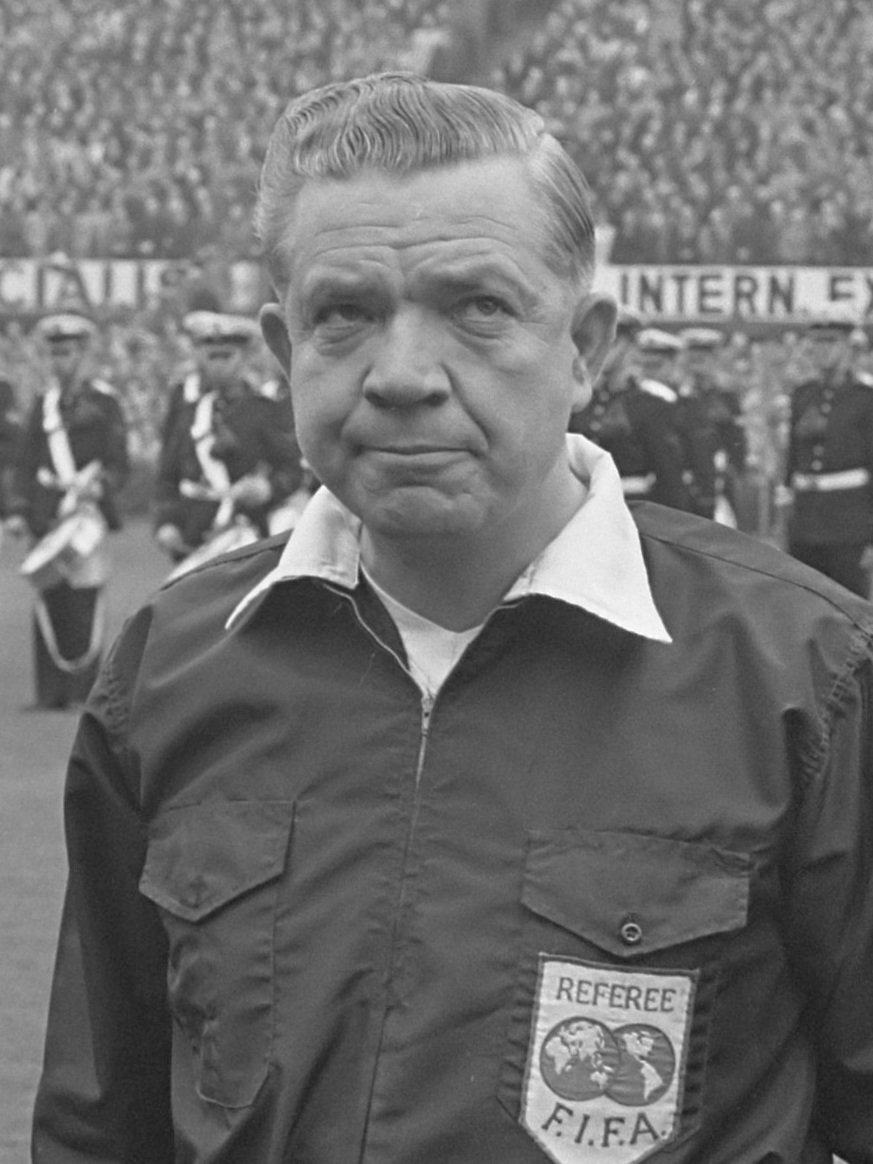
- Finney in 1966
- Full name: James Finney
- Born: 17 August 1924; St Helens, England
- Died: 1 April 2008 (aged 83); Hereford, England

Domestic
Years	League	Role
1959–1972	(England) English Football League	Referee

International
Years	League	Role
1960s–1970s	FIFA listed	Referee

James Finney (17 August 1924 – 1 April 2008) was an English football referee during the 1960s and 1970s, active on the FIFA list. He was born in St Helens, but was based during his refereeing career in Hereford. Outside football he worked as a brewery representative.

== Refereeing career ==
Finney became a Football League linesman in 1957, stepping up to referee in 1959. He refereed the Amateur Cup final of that year. Finney then took charge of the 1962 FA Cup Final between Tottenham Hotspur and Burnley. Though the normal practice at the time was for the winning captain to keep the match ball, Danny Blanchflower presented Finney with the ball at the end of the game. He is reported to be one of five freemasons to have refereed the FA Cup Final.

Finney had been held in high regard within the domestic game for some time before this match. He was appointed as a linesman in the first European Nations Cup Final held in Paris in 1960, assisting Arthur Ellis. In May 1963, Finney was also the referee during the Scotland versus Austria match at Hampden Park, which he abandoned after 79 minutes. Finney later expressed concern that he thought "somebody would have been seriously hurt".

Later he was selected as one of the English referees at the 1966 World Cup, gaining some notoriety there for his handling of the Uruguay versus West Germany quarter-final in which he sent off Horacio Troche and Héctor Silva. That was the same day on which the German referee Rudolf Kreitlein sent off Argentinian player Antonio Rattin at Wembley, leading to a suggestion of partiality against the European referees.

Finney was a BBC studio pundit for the 1970 World Cup and he officiated at the 1971 League Cup final at Wembley, and had already been appointed to the European Cup final at the same venue. However, he and his wife were seriously injured on 23 April 1971 in a car accident as they were travelling to a Preston-Aston Villa match at which he was due to officiate the following day. Although the pair recovered he was unfit to take charge of the European Cup Final, his place being taken by Jack Taylor. He expressed a hope that he would be able to have a few more matches before he reached the mandatory retirement age of 47 at the end of the 1971–1972 season. However a recurrence of an arm injury shortly afterwards meant that he was forced to retire without refereeing again.

He can be seen officiating as a local celebrity in film of The Herefordshire Primary Schools cup final in 1963 in film held by the Cinema Museum in London.

== Football administration ==
Finney later became an official at Hereford United, and was secretary of Cardiff City.

== Death ==
Finney died in hospital in Hereford on 1 April 2008.

== Sources ==
- Taylor, Jack (1976) World Soccer Referee, Pelham, p93-94 (details of accident)

Sporting positions
Preceded by J. Kelly	FA Cup Final Referee; 1962	Succeeded by Ken Aston
