= John Angus (footballer, born 1938) =

English footballer (1938–2021)

Personal information
- Date of birth: 2 September 1938
- Place of birth: Amble, Northumberland, England
- Date of death: 8 June 2021 (aged 82)
- Height: 6 ft 0 in (1.83 m)
- Position: Right back

Youth career
- Amble Boys' Club

Senior career*
Years	Team	Apps	(Gls)
1955–1972	Burnley	439	(4)

International career
1957–1961	England U23	7	(0)
1961	England	1	(0)
- * Club domestic league appearances and goals

John Angus (2 September 1938 – 8 June 2021) was an English footballer who played his entire club career as a right back for Burnley between 1956 and 1972, helping them win the Football League title in 1959–60. He also made a single appearance for England in 1961.

== Career ==
Angus was born in Amble, Northumberland and played for the local boys' club before being signed by Burnley as an amateur at the age of 16 in 1954. A year later, he was signed as a professional on his 17th birthday.

At first, he struggled to win a place in the reserve team with the quality of players then at Turf Moor and was less than a week away from his 18th birthday before his reserve team debut. A week after that debut, however, he was called into the first team after the club were hit with a number of injuries and he performed well in a 2–1 victory against Everton on 3 September 1956 giving international winger Tommy Eglington a difficult time.

Over the next two seasons he made a number of appearances in the first team but in 1958 new manager Harry Potts made Angus the regular right back, displacing Dave Smith. Angus was a superb defender and became an integral part of the Burnley side which won the Football League title in 1960, and were runners-up in both the league and FA Cup in 1962.

He was capped at U23 seven times. His full cap came on 27 May 1961, when he and Burnley teammate Brian Miller made their England debuts in the same game against Austria in Vienna. Angus was played out of position having to play at left-back, replacing Ray Wilson. England were defeated by three goals to one (from Jimmy Greaves). Unfortunately for Angus, England already had Jimmy Armfield and then George Cohen available at right back, and Angus was not selected again.

Angus continued his good form for Burnley as the title winning team was dismantled, and he had almost reached the age of 30 before his place was under threat. However the emergence of Fred Smith saw him out of the side for spells. In 1971, Burnley were relegated from the First Division; Angus was in the Second Division side for the first two games of the 1971–72 season before a tendon injury forced him out. Although he was hopeful of a recovery, this was not to be and he retired at the end of the season.

He had played in a total of 439 league games for Burnley and, with cup games, totalled 521 appearances, which placed him as the outfield player with most appearances for the club at the time, behind only goalkeeper Jerry Dawson. Subsequently, another goalkeeper, Alan Stevenson, surpassed his appearance total. His four goals all came between 1964 and 1966.

== Personal life ==
His uncle, Jack Angus played for Exeter City from 1930 to 1948.

Angus died on 8 June 2021, at the age of 82.

== Honours ==
Burnley

- Football League First Division: 1959–60
- FA Cup runner-up: 1961–62

== See also ==
- One-club man
