= Jack Hixon =

English football talent scout

John Hixon (7 February 1921 – 20 December 2009) was an English football talent scout. A familiar face at football games across the North East for decades, Hixon played a major part in furthering the careers of many footballers from the region.

Working as Burnley's scout in the North East for many years, Hixon also recommended players to Southampton, Ipswich Town, Sunderland and Newcastle United.

His most notable protégé was Alan Shearer, with whom he remained a close friend up until his death.
