= Gordon Harris (footballer, born 1940) =

English footballer

Personal information
- Full name: Gordon Harris
- Date of birth: 2 June 1940
- Place of birth: Worksop, Nottinghamshire, England
- Date of death: 10 February 2014 (aged 73)
- Place of death: Langold, Nottinghamshire, England
- Position: Midfielder

Senior career*
Years	Team	Apps	(Gls)
- Firbeck Colliery
1958–1967	Burnley	258	(69)
1967–1971	Sunderland	126	(16)
1971–1975	South Shields		

International career
1961–1963	England U23	2	(1)
1966	England	1	(0)
- * Club domestic league appearances and goals

Gordon Harris (2 June 1940 – 10 February 2014) was a professional footballer who played as a midfielder in the Football League for Burnley and Sunderland. He was capped twice for England under-23 team while a Burnley player, and once for the full national team, on 5 January 1966 in a 1–1 draw with Poland, as a late replacement for the injured Bobby Charlton.

Harris died of cancer on 10 February 2014.

== Honours ==
Burnley

- Football League First Division: 1959–60
- FA Cup runner-up: 1961–62
