= Brian Pilkington (footballer) =

English footballer (1933–2020)

Personal information
- Full name: Brian Pilkington
- Date of birth: 12 February 1933
- Place of birth: Leyland, England
- Date of death: 7 February 2020 (aged 86)
- Place of death: Adlington, England
- Position: Winger

Youth career
- 1950–1951: Leyland Motors

Senior career*
Years	Team	Apps	(Gls)
1951–1961	Burnley	300	(67)
1961–1964	Bolton Wanderers	82	(11)
1964–1965	Bury	19	(0)
1965–1967	Barrow	87	(9)
1967–1968	Chorley		
1969–1971	Leyland Motors		
Total		488	(87)

International career
1954–1957	England B	2	(1)
1954	England	1	(0)
- * Club domestic league appearances and goals

Brian Pilkington (12 February 1933 – 7 February 2020) was an English professional footballer, who played as a left winger.

== Burnley ==
Pilkington made his name with Burnley after he was recommended to the Clarets by his hometown team Leyland Motors.

With a strong interest from various north west clubs, Burnley signed him in April 1951, and he continued to work at Leyland Motors as an apprentice coach painter, while still playing for the Reserves in the Central League. Following the departure of Billy Elliott to Sunderland in the summer of 1953, Pilkington became a regular in the first team.

In February 1954, he was called in to the Royal Air Force and was stationed at RAF Kirkham, but continued to play for Burnley during this period.

During his career, Pilkington played 340 games for Burnley scoring 77 goals.

During Burnley's momentous 1959/1960 season he missed only one game and contributed 11 goals, including the opening goal at Manchester City in the 2–1 win that crowned Burnley as champions. The following season, he continued to feature for the Clarets, scoring his last two goals for the club in the victory over Hamburg in the European Cup tie at Turf Moor.

== Transfers and international appearances ==
Following this he spent three years at Bolton Wanderers, then Bury, Barrow and Chorley. He won one England cap, in place of the injured Tom Finney, whilst at Burnley, on 2 October 1954 in a 2–0 victory over Northern Ireland. He was also capped twice for England B, scoring once.

== Post-football career ==
He continued to live in Leyland and became a successful businessman and magistrate. He was married to Maureen, with whom he had a son, Tim.

In 2018 the Lancashire Football Association honoured him by naming a stand after him at their headquarters in Leyland.

== Death ==
Pilkington died in a care home in Adlington on 7 February 2020 aged 86 after a long battle with Parkinson's and Alzheimer's disease.

== Honours ==
Burnley

- Football League First Division champions: 1959–60
