= Walter Joyce =

English footballer and manager

Personal information
- Full name: Walter Joyce
- Date of birth: 10 September 1937
- Place of birth: Oldham, England
- Date of death: 29 September 1999 (aged 62)
- Place of death: Liverpool, England
- Position: Wing half

Senior career*
| Years | Team | Apps | (Gls) |
| 1954–1964 | Burnley | 70 | (3) |
| 1964–1967 | Blackburn Rovers | 120 | (4) |
| 1967–1970 | Oldham Athletic | 71 | (2) |

Managerial career
- 1973–1976: Rochdale
- * Club domestic league appearances and goals

Walter Joyce (10 September 1937 – 29 September 1999) was an English professional footballer and manager who played as a wing half, born in Oldham, Lancashire. His son, Warren Joyce, also played for Burnley.
