= John Connelly (footballer, born 1938) =

English footballer (1938–2012)

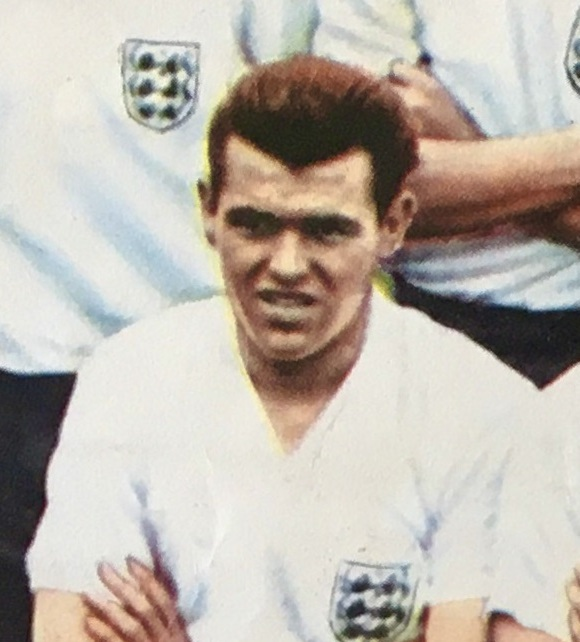
- Connelly in 1959

Personal information
- Full name: John Michael Connelly
- Date of birth: 18 July 1938
- Place of birth: St Helens, Lancashire, England
- Date of death: 25 October 2012 (aged 74)
- Place of death: Barrowford, Lancashire, England
- Height: 1.73 m (5 ft 8 in)
- Position: Outside forward

Senior career*
Years	Team	Apps	(Gls)
1956–1964	Burnley	215	(85)
1964–1966	Manchester United	80	(22)
1966–1970	Blackburn Rovers	149	(36)
1970–1973	Bury	129	(37)
Total		573	(180)

International career
1960	England U23	1	(0)
1959–1966	England	20	(7)
Medal record
Men's football
Representing England
FIFA World Cup
Winner	1966 England
- * Club domestic league appearances and goals

John Michael Connelly (18 July 1938 – 25 October 2012) was an English footballer. He played as an outside forward and was capped 20 times for his country.

== Burnley ==
Connelly began his playing career with St Helens Town in the Lancashire Combination. In November 1956, scouts from Burnley came to watch another player, but were so impressed by Connelly that he was offered a trial with Burnley, and subsequently made a permanent move to the club, who were then playing in the English top division. He made his debut away from home against Leeds United on 11 March 1957. It took two seasons for Connelly to gain a permanent place in the Burnley first team, which he did in the 1958–59 season, scoring 12 goals from 37 appearances, and ending the season as the team's second top scorer.

He was predominantly a right winger who could also play on the left. He had the ball control and speed to beat the full back on the outside and deliver accurate crosses, but was also able to cut inside and score goals with either foot. For a winger, he was always a prolific goal scorer, scoring 105 goals for Burnley in 265 appearances.

In the 1959–60 season, Connelly played a crucial part in helping Burnley to end as league champions for only the second time. He scored 20 goals in 34 league appearances. Unfortunately for him, he missed the vital last game against Manchester City that gave Burnley the title. His replacement, Trevor Meredith, scored the final winning goal while Connelly was in hospital having a cartilage operation. However, he still received a Championship winner's medal.

In the following three seasons, Connelly played a full part and scored plenty of goals to help Burnley finish fourth, second and third, respectively, in the league. In addition to finishing second in the 1961–62 season, Burnley reached the FA Cup final where they were beaten 3–1 by Tottenham Hotspur. Connelly played on the right wing and received a runners-up medal. In the 1963–64 season, the emergence of a talented young Scottish winger, Willie Morgan, meant that Connelly was forced to play on the left wing. In April 1964 he was transferred to Manchester United for £56,000.

== Manchester United ==
Connelly stayed at Manchester United for just over two seasons, making 113 appearances and scoring 35 goals. In that first season his new club finished second, but the next season, 1964–65, they finished as league champions and Connelly received a second championship medal to go with the one he won with Burnley. The following season, 1965–66, the team finished fourth in the league and were knocked out of the European Cup in the semi-finals. At the start of the 1966–67 season, Connelly was transferred to newly relegated Blackburn Rovers for £40,000.

== Subsequent career and later life ==
He played for Blackburn Rovers for four years, but was unable to help get them back into the top division. He was released by Blackburn in May 1970 and signed for Bury. He stayed with Bury for three years and retired in May 1973. In later years he owned a fish and chip shop in Brierfield, known as "Connelly's Plaice". Connelly was chosen among 25 former Burnley players for a "Wall of Legends" at Turf Moor.

Connelly died at home on 25 October 2012, at the age of 74. Burnley Football Club released a statement: "One of Burnley's most prolific and popular wingers, he died peacefully at home on Thursday morning." Turf Moor's flag flew at half mast in his memory. Players wore black armbands in respect of his death.

== International career ==
Connelly was born in England and was of Irish descent. He made his England international debut whilst still a Burnley player, on 17 October 1959, against Wales at Ninian Park. He played twenty games for England in all and scored seven goals. He was a member of the England squad that was sent out to Chile to take part in the 1962 FIFA World Cup, but he was not selected to play in any match during England's participation in the tournament.

Four years later he was a member of the England squad which won the 1966 FIFA World Cup. He played in the opening game against Uruguay at Wembley Stadium, but the match was a goalless draw and England's performance was regarded as disappointing. For subsequent games Alf Ramsey, the England manager, decided to drop Connelly from the starting team, tried other wingers (Terry Paine, Ian Callaghan) and subsequently organised the team without wingers. This proved to be his last international game. Connelly was one of four England players to play for England during the tournament but not in the final itself, the others being Terry Paine, Ian Callaghan and Jimmy Greaves.

In the 1966 World Cup final only the 11 players who played in the 4–2 win over West Germany received winners' medals. Many years later, following a Football Association led campaign to persuade FIFA to award medals to all the winners' squad members, Connelly was presented with his medal by Prime Minister Gordon Brown at a ceremony at 10 Downing Street on 10 June 2009. Connelly was the third of the 1966 World Cup winning squad to die, Bobby Moore and Alan Ball having predeceased him.

== Honours ==
Burnley

- Football League First Division: 1959–60
- FA Cup runner-up: 1961–62

Manchester United

- Football League First Division: 1964–65

England

- FIFA World Cup: 1966
