= Jimmy Robson =

English footballer (1939–2021)

Personal information
- Full name: James Robson
- Date of birth: 23 January 1939
- Place of birth: Pelton, County Durham, England
- Date of death: 14 December 2021 (aged 82)
- Position: Inside forward

Senior career*
Years	Team	Apps	(Gls)
1956–1965	Burnley	202	(79)
1965–1968	Blackpool	63	(13)
1968–1970	Barnsley	87	(15)
1970–1973	Bury	103	(3)
Total		455	(110)
- * Club domestic league appearances and goals

James Robson (23 January 1939 – 14 December 2021) was an English professional footballer who played as an inside forward. He played over 450 matches in the Football League.

Robson won the First Division with Burnley in 1960, beating Manchester City in the final game of the season to win the title.

In the 1962 FA Cup Final, Robson's goal against Tottenham Hotspur to make it 1–1 was the 100th goal ever scored in an FA Cup final at Wembley. Burnley lost 3–1. Robson did score another goal but it was ruled off-side.

On 27 April 1966, Robson became the first Blackpool substitute to score a goal. It came in a 2–1 defeat at Manchester United.

In November 1978, Robson joined Huddersfield Town as reserve team coach under Mick Buxton. He remained in the role until December 1986, when he was promoted to assistant manager under new boss, Steve Smith. He was demoted back to the reserve team in September 1987 and remained in the role until June 1988.

After developing Alzheimer's disease, Robson died on 14 December 2021, at the age of 82.

== Honours ==
Burnley

- Football League First Division: 1959–60
- FA Cup runner-up: 1961–62
