= Ray Pointer =

English footballer

Personal information
- Full name: Raymond Pointer
- Date of birth: 10 October 1936
- Place of birth: Cramlington, Northumberland, England
- Date of death: 26 January 2016 (aged 79)
- Place of death: Blackpool, Lancashire, England
- Position: Striker

Senior career*
Years	Team	Apps	(Gls)
1957–1964	Burnley	223	(118)
1965	Bury	19	(17)
1965–1966	Coventry City	26	(13)
1966–1972	Portsmouth	152	(31)
1972–1975	Waterlooville	?	(?)

International career
1961	England	3	(2)
- * Club domestic league appearances and goals

Raymond Pointer (10 October 1936 – 26 January 2016) was an English professional footballer and England international who played as a striker.

He had a long and successful playing career, totalling over 400 league appearances whilst playing for Burnley, Bury, Coventry City, Portsmouth and Waterlooville. He won 3 England caps overall whilst at Burnley, scoring 2 goals for his country. He won his first cap on 28 September 1961 in a 4–1 win against Luxembourg. He scored in that match. His other England goal was against Portugal. He died in a nursing home in Blackpool, Lancashire, in 2016.

== Honours ==
Burnley

- Football League First Division: 1959–60
- FA Cup runner-up: 1961–62
