= Adam Blacklaw =

Scottish footballer

Personal information
- Full name: Adam Smith Blacklaw
- Date of birth: 2 September 1937
- Place of birth: Aberdeen, Scotland
- Date of death: 28 February 2010 (aged 72)
- Place of death: Barnoldswick, England
- Height: 6 ft 0 in (1.83 m)
- Position: Goalkeeper

Senior career*
Years	Team	Apps	(Gls)
1956–1967	Burnley	318	(0)
1967–1970	Blackburn Rovers	96	(0)
1970–1971	Blackpool	1	(0)
Total		415	(0)

International career
1959–1960	Scotland under-23	2	(0)
1963–1965	Scotland	3	(0)

Managerial career
- Clitheroe
- * Club domestic league appearances and goals

Adam Smith Blacklaw (2 September 1937 – 28 February 2010) was a Scottish professional football player who played as a goalkeeper.

Blacklaw joined the Burnley ground staff as a schoolboy apprentice in 1954, directly from Frederick Street School in Aberdeen, earning a professional contract in October of that year. He made his first-team debut on 22 December 1956 and spent over ten seasons with the Clarets. He took over as regular goalkeeper when Colin McDonald suffered a broken leg in March 1959. During his time at Burnley, Blacklaw earned a League championship medal in season 1959–60 and an FA Cup runners-up medal in 1962. He played regularly for Burnley until 1965.

After Burnley had eliminated Stade de Reims from the 1960–61 European Cup in the first round, Reims' Just Fontaine named Blacklaw the best goalkeeper he had ever faced.

Blacklaw joined Blackburn Rovers for £15,000 at the start of the 1967–68 season and stayed for three years before finishing his career with short spells at Blackpool in season 1970–71 and moving into the non-league game with Great Harwood in season 1971–72. He later had a spell as manager of Clitheroe.

Blacklaw represented Scotland at schoolboy, under–23 and full international levels. He played in two international friendlies in June 1963, a 4–3 defeat by Norway and a 6–2 win against Spain in Madrid. His last appearance for Scotland was on 7 December 1965 in Naples, where they lost 3–0 to Italy in a crucial 1966 FIFA World Cup qualification match.

Blacklaw died on 28 February 2010. For their fixture away to Arsenal on 6 March 2010, the Burnley players wore black armbands in memory of him.

== Honours ==
Burnley

- Football League First Division: 1959–60
- FA Cup runner-up: 1961–62
