= 1961–62 FA Cup =

Tournament details
- Country: England; Wales

Final positions
- Champions: Tottenham Hotspur (4th title)
- Runners-up: Burnley

Tournament statistics
- Top goal scorer: Jimmy Greaves (9)

The 1961–62 FA Cup was the 81st staging of the world's oldest football cup competition, the Football Association Challenge Cup, commonly known as the FA Cup. Tottenham Hotspur won the competition for the fourth time, beating Burnley 3–1 in the final at Wembley. In doing so, they became the first team to retain the FA Cup since Newcastle United's victory in 1952, and the fourth team ever to do so.

Matches were scheduled to be played at the stadium of the team named first on the date specified for each round, which was always a Saturday. If scores were level after 90 minutes had been played, a replay would take place at the stadium of the second-named team later the same week. If the replayed match was drawn further replays would be held until a winner was determined. If scores were level after 90 minutes had been played in a replay, a 30-minute period of extra time would be played.

== Calendar ==
Round	Date
Preliminary round	26 August 1961
First qualifying round	9 September 1961
Second qualifying round	23 September 1961
Third qualifying round	7 October 1961
Fourth qualifying round	21 October 1961
First round proper	4 November 1961
Second round proper	25 November 1961
Third round proper	6 January 1962
Fourth round proper	27 January 1962
Fifth round proper	17 February 1962
Sixth round proper	10 March 1962
Semi-finals	31 March 1962
Final	5 May 1962

== Qualifying rounds ==
Most participating clubs that were not members of the Football League competed in the qualifying rounds to secure one of 30 places available in the first round.

The winners from the fourth qualifying round were Blyth Spartans, Shildon, Ashington, South Shields, Morecambe, Rhyl, Northwich Victoria, Brierley Hill Alliance, Hereford United, Grantham, Worksop Town, Gateshead, Kettering Town, Romford, Chelmsford City, King's Lynn, Barnet, Tunbridge Wells United, Harwich & Parkeston, Ashford Town (Kent), Margate, Dartford, Wycombe Wanderers, Banbury Spencer, Oxford United, Weymouth, Bridgwater Town, Weston-Super-Mare, Yeovil Town and Barry Town.

Those appearing in the competition proper for the first time were Brierley Hill Alliance and Weston-Super-Mare. Of the others, Ashington had last featured at this stage in 1952–53, Barry Town in 1951-52, Dartford in 1950-51, Grantham in 1949-50 and Banbury Spencer in 1947-48.

Morecambe participated in seven rounds of this season's tournament, defeating Clitheroe, Penrith, Burscough, Wigan Athletic, South Shields and Chester before going out to Weymouth in a rare third round All-Non League tie.

== First round proper ==
At this stage the 48 clubs from the Football League Third and Fourth Divisions joined the 30 non-league clubs who came through the qualifying rounds. The final two non-league sides in the draw were Walthamstow Avenue and West Auckland Town, who were given byes to this round as the champions and runners-up from the previous season's FA Amateur Cup.

Matches were scheduled to be played on 4 November 1961, although three games were not played until the midweek fixture. Nine were drawn and went to replays, with Peterborough United and Colchester United requiring a second replay which was played at Carrow Road.

Tie no	Home team	Score	Away team	Date
1	Chester	4–1	Ashington	4 November 1961
2	Darlington	0–4	Carlisle United	4 November 1961
3	Bournemouth & Boscombe Athletic	0–3	Margate	4 November 1961
4	Bristol City	1–1	Hereford United	4 November 1961
Replay	Hereford United	2–5	Bristol City	8 November 1961
5	Rochdale	2–0	Halifax Town	4 November 1961
6	Weymouth	1–0	Barnet	4 November 1961
7	Reading	1–1	Newport County	4 November 1961
Replay	Newport County	1–0	Reading	6 November 1961
8	Notts County	4–2	Yeovil Town	4 November 1961
9	Crewe Alexandra	2–0	Lincoln City	4 November 1961
10	Swindon Town	2–2	Kettering Town	4 November 1961
Replay	Kettering Town	3–0	Swindon Town	8 November 1961
11	Shrewsbury Town	7–1	Banbury Spencer	4 November 1961
12	Doncaster Rovers	0–4	Chesterfield	4 November 1961
13	Wrexham	3–2	Barrow	4 November 1961
14	Brierley Hill Alliance	3–0	Grantham	4 November 1961
15	Tranmere Rovers	2–3	Gateshead	4 November 1961
16	Stockport County	0–1	Accrington Stanley	4 November 1961
17	Wycombe Wanderers	0–0	Ashford Town (Kent)	4 November 1961
Replay	Ashford Town (Kent)	3–0	Wycombe Wanderers	8 November 1961
18	Brentford	3–0	Oxford United	4 November 1961
19	Northampton Town	2–0	Millwall	4 November 1961
20	Coventry City	2–0	Gillingham	4 November 1961
21	Bradford City	1–0	York City	4 November 1961
22	Hull City	5–0	Rhyl	4 November 1961
23	Oldham Athletic	5–2	Shildon	4 November 1961
24	West Auckland Town	3–3	Barnsley	4 November 1961
Replay	Barnsley	2–0	West Auckland Town	8 November 1961
25	Crystal Palace	3–0	Portsmouth	4 November 1961
26	Southend United	0–2	Watford	4 November 1961
27	Bradford Park Avenue	0–1	Port Vale	4 November 1961
28	Exeter City	3–3	Dartford	4 November 1961
Replay	Dartford	2–1	Exeter City	8 November 1961
29	Hartlepools United	5–1	Blyth Spartans	4 November 1961
30	Mansfield Town	3–2	Grimsby Town	4 November 1961
31	Southport	1–0	Northwich Victoria	4 November 1961
32	Morecambe	2–1	South Shields	4 November 1961
33	Torquay United	5–1	Harwich & Parkeston	4 November 1961
34	Workington	2–0	Worksop Town	4 November 1961
35	Walthamstow Avenue	2–3	Romford	4 November 1961
36	Aldershot	3–1	Tunbridge Wells United	4 November 1961
37	Peterborough United	3–3	Colchester United	4 November 1961
Replay	Colchester United	2–2	Peterborough United	6 November 1961
Replay	Peterborough United	3–0	Colchester United	13 November 1961
38	Chelmsford City	1–2	King's Lynn	4 November 1961
39	Barry Town	1–1	Queens Park Rangers	4 November 1961
Replay	Queens Park Rangers	7–0	Barry Town	6 November 1961
40	Bridgwater Town	0–0	Weston-Super-Mare	4 November 1961
Replay	Weston-Super-Mare	0–1	Bridgwater Town	9 November 1961

== Second round proper ==
The matches were scheduled for 25 November 1961. Four matches were drawn, with replays taking place later the same week.

Tie no	Home team	Score	Away team	Date
1	Ashford Town (Kent)	0–3	Queens Park Rangers	25 November 1961
2	Chester	0–1	Morecambe	25 November 1961
3	Chesterfield	2–2	Oldham Athletic	25 November 1961
Replay	Oldham Athletic	4–2	Chesterfield	29 November 1961
4	Bristol City	8–2	Dartford	25 November 1961
5	Rochdale	1–2	Wrexham	25 November 1961
6	Weymouth	1–0	Newport County	25 November 1961
7	Crewe Alexandra	1–1	Port Vale	25 November 1961
Replay	Port Vale	3–0	Crewe Alexandra	27 November 1961
8	Shrewsbury Town	3–0	Brierley Hill Alliance	25 November 1961
9	Barnsley	1–2	Carlisle United	25 November 1961
10	Northampton Town	3–0	Kettering Town	25 November 1961
11	Coventry City	1–2	King's Lynn	25 November 1961
12	Hull City	0–2	Bradford City	25 November 1961
13	Hartlepools United	2–1	Accrington Stanley	25 November 1961
14	Margate	1–1	Notts County	25 November 1961
Replay	Notts County	3–1	Margate	30 November 1961
15	Southport	4–2	Mansfield Town	25 November 1961
16	Torquay United	1–4	Peterborough United	25 November 1961
17	Aldershot	2–2	Brentford	25 November 1961
Replay	Brentford	2–0	Aldershot	28 November 1961
18	Romford	1–3	Watford	25 November 1961
19	Gateshead	0–2	Workington	25 November 1961
20	Bridgwater Town	0–3	Crystal Palace	25 November 1961

== Third round proper ==
The 44 First and Second Division clubs entered the competition at this stage. The matches were scheduled for 6 January 1962, with seven matches postponed until later dates. Ten matches were drawn and went to replays, with two of these requiring a second replay.

Tie no	Home team	Score	Away team	Date
1	Blackpool	0–0	West Bromwich Albion	6 January 1962
Replay	West Bromwich Albion	2–1	Blackpool	10 January 1962
2	Bristol City	0–0	Walsall	6 January 1962
Replay	Walsall	4–1	Bristol City	9 January 1962
3	Burnley	6–1	Queens Park Rangers	6 January 1962
4	Bury	0–0	Sheffield United	6 January 1962
Replay	Sheffield United	2–2	Bury	10 January 1962
Replay	Bury	0–2	Sheffield United	15 January 1962
5	Liverpool	4–3	Chelsea	6 January 1962
6	Preston North End	3–2	Watford	6 January 1962
7	Southampton	2–2	Sunderland	6 January 1962
Replay	Sunderland	3–0	Southampton	10 January 1962
8	Leicester City	1–1	Stoke City	10 January 1962
Replay	Stoke City	5–2	Leicester City	15 January 1962
9	Notts County	0–1	Manchester City	6 January 1962
10	Aston Villa	4–3	Crystal Palace	6 January 1962
11	Sheffield Wednesday	1–0	Swansea Town	9 January 1962
12	Wolverhampton Wanderers	3–1	Carlisle United	8 January 1962
13	Middlesbrough	1–0	Cardiff City	10 January 1962
14	Everton	4–0	King's Lynn	6 January 1962
15	Ipswich Town	1–1	Luton Town	6 January 1962
Replay	Luton Town	1–1	Ipswich Town	10 January 1962
Replay	Ipswich Town	5–1	Luton Town	15 January 1962
16	Newcastle United	0–1	Peterborough United	6 January 1962
17	Fulham	3–1	Hartlepools United	6 January 1962
18	Brentford	1–1	Leyton Orient	6 January 1962
Replay	Leyton Orient	2–1	Brentford	8 January 1962
19	Bristol Rovers	1–1	Oldham Athletic	6 January 1962
Replay	Oldham Athletic	2–0	Bristol Rovers	10 January 1962
20	Brighton & Hove Albion	0–3	Blackburn Rovers	6 January 1962
21	Manchester United	2–1	Bolton Wanderers	6 January 1962
22	Norwich City	3–1	Wrexham	10 January 1962
23	Plymouth Argyle	3–0	West Ham United	6 January 1962
24	Huddersfield Town	4–3	Rotherham United	9 January 1962
25	Port Vale	3–1	Northampton Town	6 January 1962
26	Charlton Athletic	1–0	Scunthorpe United	6 January 1962
27	Arsenal	3–0	Bradford City	6 January 1962
28	Southport	1–3	Shrewsbury Town	9 January 1962
29	Morecambe	0–1	Weymouth	6 January 1962
30	Leeds United	2–2	Derby County	6 January 1962
Replay	Derby County	3–1	Leeds United	10 January 1962
31	Workington	1–2	Nottingham Forest	6 January 1962
32	Birmingham City	3–3	Tottenham Hotspur	6 January 1962
Replay	Tottenham Hotspur	4–2	Birmingham City	10 January 1962

== Fourth round proper ==
The matches were scheduled for 27 January 1962, with three Lancashire-based games postponed until the midweek fixtures. Five matches were drawn and went to replays, which were all played in the following midweek match. Weymouth was the last non-league club left in the competition.

Tie no	Home team	Score	Away team	Date
1	Burnley	1–1	Leyton Orient	30 January 1962
Replay	Leyton Orient	0–1	Burnley	6 February 1962
2	Preston North End	2–0	Weymouth	29 January 1962
3	Nottingham Forest	0–2	Sheffield Wednesday	27 January 1962
4	Aston Villa	2–1	Huddersfield Town	27 January 1962
5	Wolverhampton Wanderers	1–2	West Bromwich Albion	27 January 1962
6	Sunderland	0–0	Port Vale	27 January 1962
Replay	Port Vale	3–1	Sunderland	31 January 1962
7	Everton	2–0	Manchester City	27 January 1962
8	Shrewsbury Town	2–2	Middlesbrough	27 January 1962
Replay	Middlesbrough	5–1	Shrewsbury Town	31 January 1962
9	Fulham	2–2	Walsall	27 January 1962
Replay	Walsall	0–2	Fulham	30 January 1962
10	Manchester United	1–0	Arsenal	31 January 1962
11	Norwich City	1–1	Ipswich Town	27 January 1962
Replay	Ipswich Town	1–2	Norwich City	30 January 1962
12	Plymouth Argyle	1–5	Tottenham Hotspur	27 January 1962
13	Oldham Athletic	1–2	Liverpool	27 January 1962
14	Charlton Athletic	2–1	Derby County	27 January 1962
15	Stoke City	0–1	Blackburn Rovers	27 January 1962
16	Peterborough United	1–3	Sheffield United	27 January 1962

== Fifth round proper ==
The matches were scheduled for 17 February 1962. Two matches went to replays in the following mid-week fixtures, with the Liverpool–Preston North End game requiring a second replay (at Old Trafford) before the tie was settled.

Tie no	Home team	Score	Away team	Date
1	Burnley	3–1	Everton	17 February 1962
2	Liverpool	0–0	Preston North End	17 February 1962
Replay	Preston North End	0–0	Liverpool	20 February 1962
Replay	Liverpool	0–1	Preston North End	26 February 1962
3	Blackburn Rovers	2–1	Middlesbrough	17 February 1962
4	Aston Villa	2–1	Charlton Athletic	17 February 1962
5	West Bromwich Albion	2–4	Tottenham Hotspur	17 February 1962
6	Sheffield United	3–1	Norwich City	17 February 1962
7	Fulham	1–0	Port Vale	17 February 1962
8	Manchester United	0–0	Sheffield Wednesday	17 February 1962
Replay	Sheffield Wednesday	0–2	Manchester United	21 February 1962

== Sixth round proper ==
The four quarter-final ties were scheduled to be played on 10 March 1962. Two matches went to replays on the 14th before being settled.

Tie no	Home team	Score	Away team	Date
1	Preston North End	0–0	Manchester United	10 March 1962
Replay	Manchester United	2–1	Preston North End	14 March 1962
2	Sheffield United	0–1	Burnley	10 March 1962
3	Tottenham Hotspur	2–0	Aston Villa	10 March 1962
4	Fulham	2–2	Blackburn Rovers	10 March 1962
Replay	Blackburn Rovers	0–1	Fulham	14 March 1962

== Semi-finals ==
The semi-final matches were played on 31 March 1962 with a replay being required between Burnley and Fulham on 9 April 1962. Tottenham and Burnley came through the semi-final round to meet at Wembley.

31 March 1962
15:00

Burnley	1–1	Fulham
Connelly 50'	Report	Leggat 29'

Villa Park, Birmingham
Attendance: 68,000
Referee: W. Clement, Birmingham
31 March 1962
15:00

Tottenham Hotspur	3–1	Manchester United
Greaves 4'; Jones 23'; Medwin 87'	Report	Herd 85'

Hillsborough, Sheffield
Attendance: 65,000
Referee: R. Langdale, Darlington

=== Replay ===
9 April 1962
19:45

Fulham	1–2	Burnley
Langley 90'	Report	Robson 33' 80'

Filbert Street, Leicester
Referee: W. E. Clements (West Bromwich)

== Final ==
The 1962 FA Cup final took place on 5 May 1962 at Wembley Stadium and was won by Tottenham Hotspur over Burnley, by a 3–1 scoreline. Due to the lack of passion and excitement, replaced by patience and cautious play, the final was dubbed "The Chessboard Final". Tottenham took to the field as holders, having won the League and FA Cup Double in 1961.

5 May 1962

Tottenham Hotspur	3–1	Burnley
Greaves 3'; Smith 51'; Blanchflower 80' (pen.)		Robson 50'

Wembley Stadium, London
Attendance: 100,000
Referee: J. Finney
