= 1959–60 in English football =

Football in England
- Season: 1959–60

Men's football
- First Division: Burnley
- Second Division: Aston Villa
- Third Division: Southampton
- Fourth Division: Walsall
- FA Cup: Wolverhampton Wanderers
- Charity Shield: Wolverhampton Wanderers

The 1959–60 season was the 80th season of competitive football in England.

== Honours ==
Competition	Winner	Runner-up
First Division	Burnley (2)	Wolverhampton Wanderers
Second Division	Aston Villa	Cardiff City
Third Division	Southampton	Norwich City
Fourth Division	Walsall	Notts County
FA Cup	Wolverhampton Wanderers (4)	Blackburn Rovers
Charity Shield	Wolverhampton Wanderers	Nottingham Forest
Home Championship	England, Scotland & Wales shared	

Notes = Number in parentheses is the times that club has won that honour. * indicates new record for competition

== Awards ==
Football Writers' Association

- Footballer of the Year – Bill Slater (Wolverhampton Wanderers)

== Football League ==
=== First Division ===
Burnley failed to top the First Division all season, but pipped Wolves to top spot on the final day of their season to clinch the title. Wolves finished their season on 30-April on 54 points. Burnley's last game of the season was on Monday, 2 May, which they won to move to 55 points. The runners-up Wolves, while missing out on a third successive league title and becoming the first team this century to win the elusive double, went on to win the FA Cup this season. Tottenham Hotspur, West Bromwich Albion and newly promoted Sheffield Wednesday completed the top five. Manchester United, last season's runners-up, dipped to seventh in the league this season despite 32 goals from forward Dennis Viollet and the mid-season signing of half-back Maurice Setters. Luton Town, last season's FA Cup finalists, went down in bottom place, and were joined in relegation by Leeds United.

Pos	Team	Pld	W	D	L	GF	GA	GAv	Pts	Qualification or relegation
1	Burnley (C)	42	24	7	11	85	61	1.393	55	Qualification for the European Cup first round
2	Wolverhampton Wanderers	42	24	6	12	106	67	1.582	54	Qualification for the Cup Winners' Cup quarter-finals
3	Tottenham Hotspur	42	21	11	10	86	50	1.720	53	
4	West Bromwich Albion	42	19	11	12	83	57	1.456	49	
5	Sheffield Wednesday	42	19	11	12	80	59	1.356	49	
6	Bolton Wanderers	42	20	8	14	59	51	1.157	48	
7	Manchester United	42	19	7	16	102	80	1.275	45	
8	Newcastle United	42	18	8	16	82	78	1.051	44	
9	Preston North End	42	16	12	14	79	76	1.039	44	
10	Fulham	42	17	10	15	73	80	0.913	44	
11	Blackpool	42	15	10	17	59	71	0.831	40	
12	Leicester City	42	13	13	16	66	75	0.880	39	
13	Arsenal	42	15	9	18	68	80	0.850	39	
14	West Ham United	42	16	6	20	75	91	0.824	38	
15	Everton	42	13	11	18	73	78	0.936	37	
16	Manchester City	42	17	3	22	78	84	0.929	37	
17	Blackburn Rovers	42	16	5	21	60	70	0.857	37	
18	Chelsea	42	14	9	19	76	91	0.835	37	
19	Birmingham City	42	13	10	19	63	80	0.788	36	Qualification for the Inter-Cities Fairs Cup first round
20	Nottingham Forest	42	13	9	20	50	74	0.676	35	
21	Leeds United (R)	42	12	10	20	65	92	0.707	34	Relegation to the Second Division
22	Luton Town (R)	42	9	12	21	50	73	0.685	30	Relegation to the Second Division

Source: World Football
Rules for classification: 1) Points; 2) Goal average; 3) Goals scored
(C) Champions; (R) Relegated

=== Second Division ===
Aston Villa earned an immediate return to the First Division as Second Division champions, and were joined in promotion by runners-up Cardiff City. Liverpool's change of manager from Phil Taylor to Bill Shankly was not enough to earn them promotion, as they finished in third place, eight points adrift of promotion. Huddersfield Town could only finish sixth in the Second Division despite the goals of brilliant young forward Denis Law, who was sold to Manchester City towards the end of the season for a national record fee.

Hull City and Bristol City went down to the Third Division.

Pos	Team	Pld	W	D	L	GF	GA	GAv	Pts	Qualification or relegation
1	Aston Villa (C, P)	42	25	9	8	89	43	2.070	59	Promotion to the First Division
2	Cardiff City (P)	42	23	12	7	90	62	1.452	58	Promotion to the First Division
3	Liverpool	42	20	10	12	90	66	1.364	50	
4	Sheffield United	42	19	12	11	68	51	1.333	50	
5	Middlesbrough	42	19	10	13	90	64	1.406	48	
6	Huddersfield Town	42	19	9	14	73	52	1.404	47	
7	Charlton Athletic	42	17	13	12	90	87	1.034	47	
8	Rotherham United	42	17	13	12	61	60	1.017	47	
9	Bristol Rovers	42	18	11	13	72	78	0.923	47	
10	Leyton Orient	42	15	14	13	76	61	1.246	44	
11	Ipswich Town	42	19	6	17	78	68	1.147	44	
12	Swansea Town	42	15	10	17	82	84	0.976	40	
13	Lincoln City	42	16	7	19	75	78	0.962	39	
14	Brighton & Hove Albion	42	13	12	17	67	76	0.882	38	
15	Scunthorpe United	42	13	10	19	57	71	0.803	36	
16	Sunderland	42	12	12	18	52	65	0.800	36	
17	Stoke City	42	14	7	21	66	83	0.795	35	
18	Derby County	42	14	7	21	61	77	0.792	35	
19	Plymouth Argyle	42	13	9	20	61	89	0.685	35	
20	Portsmouth	42	10	12	20	59	77	0.766	32	
21	Hull City (R)	42	10	10	22	48	76	0.632	30	Relegation to the Third Division
22	Bristol City (R)	42	11	5	26	60	97	0.619	27	Relegation to the Third Division

Rules for classification: 1) Points; 2) Goal average; 3) Goals scored
(C) Champions; (P) Promoted; (R) Relegated

=== Third Division ===
The Third Division promotion race was very much a two-horse race for much of the season, ending with Southampton going up as champions and Norwich City as runners-up.

Accrington Stanley, Wrexham, York City and Mansfield Town went down to the Fourth Division.

Pos	Team	Pld	W	D	L	GF	GA	GAv	Pts	Promotion or relegation
1	Southampton (C, P)	46	26	9	11	106	75	1.413	61	Promotion to the Second Division
2	Norwich City (P)	46	24	11	11	82	54	1.519	59	Promotion to the Second Division
3	Shrewsbury Town	46	18	16	12	97	75	1.293	52	
4	Grimsby Town	46	18	16	12	87	70	1.243	52	
5	Coventry City	46	21	10	15	78	63	1.238	52	
6	Brentford	46	21	9	16	78	61	1.279	51	
7	Bury	46	21	9	16	64	51	1.255	51	
8	Queens Park Rangers	46	18	13	15	73	54	1.352	49	
9	Colchester United	46	18	11	17	83	74	1.122	47	
10	Bournemouth & Boscombe Athletic	46	17	13	16	72	72	1.000	47	
11	Reading	46	18	10	18	84	77	1.091	46	
12	Southend United	46	19	8	19	76	74	1.027	46	
13	Newport County	46	20	6	20	80	79	1.013	46	
14	Port Vale	46	19	8	19	80	79	1.013	46	
15	Halifax Town	46	18	10	18	70	72	0.972	46	
16	Swindon Town	46	19	8	19	69	78	0.885	46	
17	Barnsley	46	15	14	17	65	66	0.985	44	
18	Chesterfield	46	18	7	21	71	84	0.845	43	
19	Bradford City	46	15	12	19	66	74	0.892	42	
20	Tranmere Rovers	46	14	13	19	72	75	0.960	41	
21	York City (R)	46	13	12	21	57	73	0.781	38	Relegation to the Fourth Division
22	Mansfield Town (R)	46	15	6	25	81	112	0.723	36	Relegation to the Fourth Division
23	Wrexham (R)	46	14	8	24	68	101	0.673	36	Relegation to the Fourth Division
24	Accrington Stanley (R)	46	11	5	30	57	123	0.463	27	Relegation to the Fourth Division

(C) Champions; (P) Promoted; (R) Relegated

=== Fourth Division ===
Walsall sealed the Fourth Division title and with it a place in the Third Division. They were joined in the higher division by Notts County, Torquay United and Watford.

Gateshead were voted out of the Football League and replaced by ambitious Southern League side Peterborough United, who boasted a 30,000-capacity stadium.

Pos	Team	Pld	W	D	L	GF	GA	GAv	Pts	Promotion or relegation
1	Walsall (C, P)	46	28	9	9	102	60	1.700	65	Promotion to the Third Division
2	Notts County (P)	46	26	8	12	107	69	1.551	60	Promotion to the Third Division
3	Torquay United (P)	46	26	8	12	84	58	1.448	60	Promotion to the Third Division
4	Watford (P)	46	24	9	13	92	67	1.373	57	Promotion to the Third Division
5	Millwall	46	18	17	11	84	61	1.377	53	
6	Northampton Town	46	22	9	15	85	63	1.349	53	
7	Gillingham	46	21	10	15	74	69	1.072	52	
8	Crystal Palace	46	19	12	15	84	64	1.313	50	
9	Exeter City	46	19	11	16	80	70	1.143	49	
10	Stockport County	46	19	11	16	58	54	1.074	49	
11	Bradford (Park Avenue)	46	17	15	14	70	68	1.029	49	
12	Rochdale	46	18	10	18	65	60	1.083	46	
13	Aldershot	46	18	9	19	77	74	1.041	45	
14	Crewe Alexandra	46	18	9	19	79	88	0.898	45	
15	Darlington	46	17	9	20	63	73	0.863	43	
16	Workington	46	14	14	18	68	60	1.133	42	
17	Doncaster Rovers	46	16	10	20	69	76	0.908	42	
18	Barrow	46	15	11	20	77	87	0.885	41	
19	Carlisle United	46	15	11	20	51	66	0.773	41	
20	Chester	46	14	12	20	59	77	0.766	40	
21	Southport	46	10	14	22	48	92	0.522	34	Re-elected
22	Gateshead (R)	46	12	9	25	58	86	0.674	33	Failed re-election and demoted
23	Oldham Athletic	46	8	12	26	41	83	0.494	28	Re-elected
24	Hartlepools United	46	10	7	29	59	109	0.541	27	Re-elected

Source: rsssf.com
(C) Champions; (P) Promoted; (R) Relegated

=== Top goalscorers ===
First Division

- Dennis Viollet (Manchester United) – 32 goals

Second Division

- Brian Clough (Middlesbrough) – 39 goals

Third Division

- Derek Reeves (Southampton) – 39 goals

Fourth Division

- Cliff Holton (Watford) – 42 goals
