= Bill Robertson (Scottish footballer) =

Scottish footballer (1928–1973)

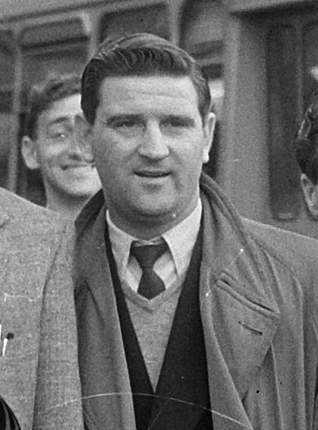
- Robertson in 1955

Personal information
- Full name: William Gibb Robertson
- Date of birth: 13 November 1928
- Place of birth: Glasgow, Scotland
- Date of death: 26 June 1973 (aged 44)
- Place of death: Sutton, London, England
- Position: Goalkeeper

Youth career
- –1946: Arthurlie
- 1946–1951: Chelsea

Senior career*
Years	Team	Apps	(Gls)
1951–1960	Chelsea	199	
1960–1963	Leyton Orient	47	
1963–1964	Dover		
1970	Ashford Town		
- * Club domestic league appearances and goals

William Gibb Robertson (13 November 1928 – 26 June 1973) was a Scottish professional footballer, who played as a goalkeeper in the English Football League and made a total of 246 league appearances for Chelsea and Leyton Orient.

== Career ==
In July 1946 Robertson, aged 17, was signed by First Division club Chelsea from Arthurlie of the Scottish Central Junior League. He made his league debut for Chelsea five years later on 21 April 1951 against Liverpool, when he kept a clean sheet in a 1–0 victory – in his four appearances at the end of the season Chelsea recorded four wins that were instrumental in the team escaping relegation. He missed only one league match during the following 1951–52 season and played in excess of half of the teams league matches in each of the next four seasons. This included 26 matches in the 1954–55 season, when Chelsea won the First Division championship – Robertson was injured mid-season in January 1955 and Charlie Thomson played in the remaining 16 matches of the season. By the next campaign he had regained his starting spot and played in 34 league matches, however after commencing the 1956–57 season as Chelsea's starting goalkeeper after mid-November 1956 Robertson made only a further four appearances that season and did not play for the first team during the 1957–58 season. He played 13 more matches for Chelsea over the next two seasons, taking his total to 199 league appearances and 215 in total in all competitions for Chelsea.

In September 1960 Robertson transferred to Second Division club Leyton Orient for a £1,000 transfer fee. His 47 league appearances for the club were evenly divided over three seasons. During the second of these, the 1961–62 season, during which Leyton Orient won promotion to the First Division, Robertson played in the latter 15 matches of the campaign, keeping seven clean sheets. He was the team's starting goalkeeper for the opening 14 First Division league matches of the 1962–63 season but played in the first team in league matches only twice more, during March 1963. Leyton Orient were relegated at the end of the season and Robertson was not retained by the club.

Robertson signed for non-league club Dover of the Southern League in July 1963 but did not establish himself as their regular starting goalkeeper. In September 1970 he made a one-off appearance in a Southern League Premier Division match for Ashford Town who were managed by his former Chelsea team-mate Peter Sillett.

Robertson died in Sutton, London on 26 June 1973, at the age of 44.

== Football league career statistics ==
Appearances (Apps), Goals Conceded (Goals Conc'd) and Clean Sheets by club, season and competition
Club	Season	League				FA Cup			Other			Total		
Club	Season	Division	Apps	Goals Conc'd	Clean Sheets	Apps	Goals Conc'd	Clean Sheets	Apps	Goals Conc'd	Clean Sheets	Apps	Goals Conc'd	Clean Sheets
Chelsea	1950–51	First Division	4	2	2	0	0	0	0	0	0	4	2	2
Chelsea	1951–52	First Division	41	72	6	9	11	2	0	0	0	50	83	8
Chelsea	1952–53	First Division	27	46	4	0	0	0	0	0	0	27	46	4
Chelsea	1953–54	First Division	34	55	6	0	0	0	0	0	0	34	55	6
Chelsea	1954–55	First Division	26	39	2	1	0	1	0	0	0	27	39	3
Chelsea	1955–56	First Division	34	61	7	4	4	1	1 (Note: 1955 FA Charity Shield)	0	1	39	65	9
Chelsea	1956–57	First Division	20	34	6	0	0	0	0	0	0	20	34	6
Chelsea	1957–58	First Division	0	0	0	0	0	0	0	0	0	0	0	0
Chelsea	1958–59	First Division	10	23	0	0	0	0	1 (Note: 1958–60 Inter-Cities Fairs Cup)	4	0	11	27	0
Chelsea	1959–60	First Division	3	5	0	0	0	0	0	0	0	3	5	0
Chelsea	Total		199	337	33	14	15	4	2	4	1	215	356	38
Leyton Orient	1960–61	Second Division	15	18	2	0	0	0	0	0	0	15	18	2
Leyton Orient	1961–62	Second Division	16	12	8	0	0	0	0	0	0	16	12	8
Leyton Orient	1962–63	First Division	16	26	4	2	1	1	2 (Note: 1962–63 Football League Cup)	4	0	20	31	5
Leyton Orient	Total		47	56	14	2	1	1	2	4	0	51	61	15
Career total			246	393	47	16	16	5	4	8	1	266	417	53
As of matches played 23 March 1963
