= 1960–61 Chelsea F.C. season =

English football club season

Chelsea
1960-61 season
- Chairman: Joe Mears
- Manager: Ted Drake
- First Division: 12th
- FA Cup: Third round
- League Cup: Fourth round
- Top goalscorer: League: Jimmy Greaves (41); All: Jimmy Greaves (43)
- Highest home attendance: 57,103 vs Tottenham Hotspur (3 April 1961)
- Lowest home attendance: 19,568 vs West Bromwich Albion (3 December 1960)
| Home colours | Away colours | Third colours |

The 1960–61 season was Chelsea Football Club's 47th of competitive football, and their 35th in the English top flight.

Chelsea's performances and results were erratic throughout the season, typified by large victories over Arsenal, Newcastle United and West Bromwich Albion and heavy defeats against Manchester United, Wolverhampton Wanderers and Burnley, culminating in a sixth consecutive mid-table finish since their Championship success in 1955. The club were also victims of an upset in the FA Cup, losing 2–1 at home to Fourth Division side Crewe Alexandra.

The season was nonetheless a watershed in the club's history; frustrated at the club's lack of direction, Chelsea's star player Jimmy Greaves joined AC Milan at the end of the season. Manager Ted Drake, his position weakened by the Crewe result in particular, would also leave the club early into the next season.

Despite the lack of tangible success, the season produced a series of records. Chelsea scored 98 league goals, a record that stood until Chelsea's record breaking 2009–10 season and conceded 100 goals – another club record. Greaves scored 41 league goals, plus another two in the League Cup for a seasonal total of 43, which has never been bettered by another Chelsea player. Greaves also notched six hat-tricks (another club record for a single season), and during the campaign scored his 100th career league goal; at the age of 21, still the youngest ever player to do so.

== Results ==
=== First Division ===
| Date | Opponent | Venue | Result | Attendance | Scorers |
|---|---|---|---|---|---|
| 20 August 1960 | Aston Villa | A | 2-3 | 43,776 | Brabrook, Gibbs |
| 24 August 1960 | Leicester City | H | 1-3 | 24,691 | Bradbury |
| 27 August 1960 | Wolverhampton Wanderers | H | 3-3 | 41,681 | Greaves (3) |
| 31 August 1960 | Leicester City | A | 3-1 | 21,087 | Sillett, Greaves, Brooks |
| 3 September 1960 | Bolton Wanderers | A | 1-4 | 21,609 | Greaves |
| 7 September 1960 | Blackburn Rovers | H | 5-2 | 23,224 | Greaves (3), Livesey (2) |
| 10 September 1960 | West Ham United | H | 3-2 | 37,873 | Greaves, Livesey, Blunstone |
| 17 September 1960 | Fulham | A | 2-3 | 37,423 | Livesey, Blunstone |
| 19 September 1960 | Blackburn Rovers | A | 1-3 | 21,508 | Brabrook |
| 24 September 1960 | Blackpool | A | 4-1 | 26,546 | Greaves (2), Livesey (2) |
| 1 October 1960 | Everton | H | 3-3 | 31,457 | Greaves, Blunstone, Livesey |
| 15 October 1960 | Birmingham City | A | 0-1 | 22,337 | |
| 22 October 1960 | Burnley | H | 2-6 | 29,080 | Brabrook, Greaves |
| 29 October 1960 | Preston North End | A | 2-0 | 14,174 | Tindall, Tambling |
| 5 November 1960 | Newcastle United | H | 4-2 | 30,489 | Brabrook, Tindall (3) |
| 12 November 1960 | Arsenal | A | 4-1 | 38,666 | Mortimore, Greaves, Tindall, Tambling |
| 19 November 1960 | Manchester City | H | 6-3 | 37,346 | Greaves (3), Tindall (2), Tambling |
| 26 November 1960 | Nottingham Forest | A | 1-2 | 22,121 | Brabrook |
| 3 December 1960 | West Bromwich Albion | H | 7-1 | 19,568 | Brabrook, Greaves (5), Tindall |
| 10 December 1960 | Cardiff City | A | 1-2 | 21,840 | Greaves |
| 17 December 1960 | Aston Villa | H | 2-4 | 23,805 | Greaves (2) |
| 24 December 1960 | Manchester United | H | 1-2 | 37,601 | Brabrook |
| 26 December 1960 | Manchester United | A | 0-6 | 50,213 | |
| 31 December 1960 | Wolverhampton Wanderers | A | 1-6 | 28,503 | Anderton |
| 14 January 1961 | Bolton Wanderers | H | 1-1 | 20,461 | Livesey |
| 21 January 1961 | West Ham United | A | 1-3 | 21,829 | Blunstone |
| 4 February 1961 | Fulham | H | 2-1 | 39,185 | Greaves, Bridges |
| 11 February 1961 | Blackpool | H | 2-2 | 21,993 | Sillett, Greaves |
| 18 February 1961 | Everton | A | 1-1 | 34,449 | Greaves |
| 25 February 1961 | Sheffield Wednesday | A | 0-1 | 21,936 | |
| 4 March 1961 | Birmingham City | H | 3-2 | 27,727 | Greaves, Tindall, Tambling |
| 11 March 1961 | Burnley | A | 4-4 | 19,435 | Greaves (2), Tambling (2) |
| 18 March 1961 | Preston North End | H | 1-1 | 22,031 | Tindall |
| 25 March 1961 | Newcastle United | A | 6-1 | 28,975 | Greaves (4), Tindall (2) |
| 31 March 1961 | Tottenham Hotspur | A | 2-4 | 65,032 | Brabrook, Tindall |
| 1 April 1961 | Cardiff City | H | 6-1 | 22,697 | Greaves, Tindall (2), Tambling, Harrison, Harrington (o.g.) |
| 3 April 1961 | Tottenham Hotspur | H | 2-3 | 57,103 | Blunstone, Greaves |
| 8 April 1961 | Manchester City | A | 1-2 | 27,720 | Tambling |
| 15 April 1961 | Arsenal | H | 3-1 | 38,233 | Tindall, Tambling, Neill (o.g.) |
| 22 April 1961 | West Bromwich Albion | A | 0-3 | 17,691 | |
| 26 April 1961 | Sheffield Wednesday | H | 0-2 | 24,258 | |
| 29 April 1961 | Nottingham Forest | H | 4-3 | 22,775 | Greaves (4) |

| Pos | Team | Pld | W | D | L | GF | GA | GAv | Pts | Qualification or relegation |
|---|---|---|---|---|---|---|---|---|---|---|
| 10 | West Bromwich Albion | 42 | 18 | 5 | 19 | 67 | 71 | 0.944 | 41 | |
| 11 | Arsenal | 42 | 15 | 11 | 16 | 77 | 85 | 0.906 | 41 | |
| 12 | Chelsea | 42 | 15 | 7 | 20 | 98 | 100 | 0.980 | 37 | |
| 13 | Manchester City | 42 | 13 | 11 | 18 | 79 | 90 | 0.878 | 37 | |
| 14 | Nottingham Forest | 42 | 14 | 9 | 19 | 62 | 78 | 0.795 | 37 | Qualification for the Inter-Cities Fairs Cup first round |

Source: World Football
Rules for classification: 1) Points; 2) Goal average; 3) Goals scored

=== FA Cup ===
| Date | Round | Opponent | Venue | Result | Attendance | Scorers |
|---|---|---|---|---|---|---|
| 7 January 1961 | 3 | Crewe Alexandra | H | 1-2 | 32,574 | Blunstone |

=== League Cup ===
| Date | Round | Opponent | Venue | Result | Attendance | Scorers |
|---|---|---|---|---|---|---|
| 10 October 1960 | 1 | Millwall | A | 7-1 | 15,007 | P.Sillett (2), Evans, Brabrook, Greaves (2), Brooks |
| 24 October 1960 | 2 | Workington | H | 4-2 | 5,630 | Mortimore, Brabrook, Nicholas, Tambling |
| 6 November 1960 | 3 | Doncaster Rovers | A | 7-0 | 9,951 | J.Sillett, Brabrook (2), Blunstone (2), Tambling (2) |
| 4 December 1960 | 4 | Portsmouth | A | 0-1 | 13,054 | |
