= Roy Bentley =

English footballer and manager (1924–2018)

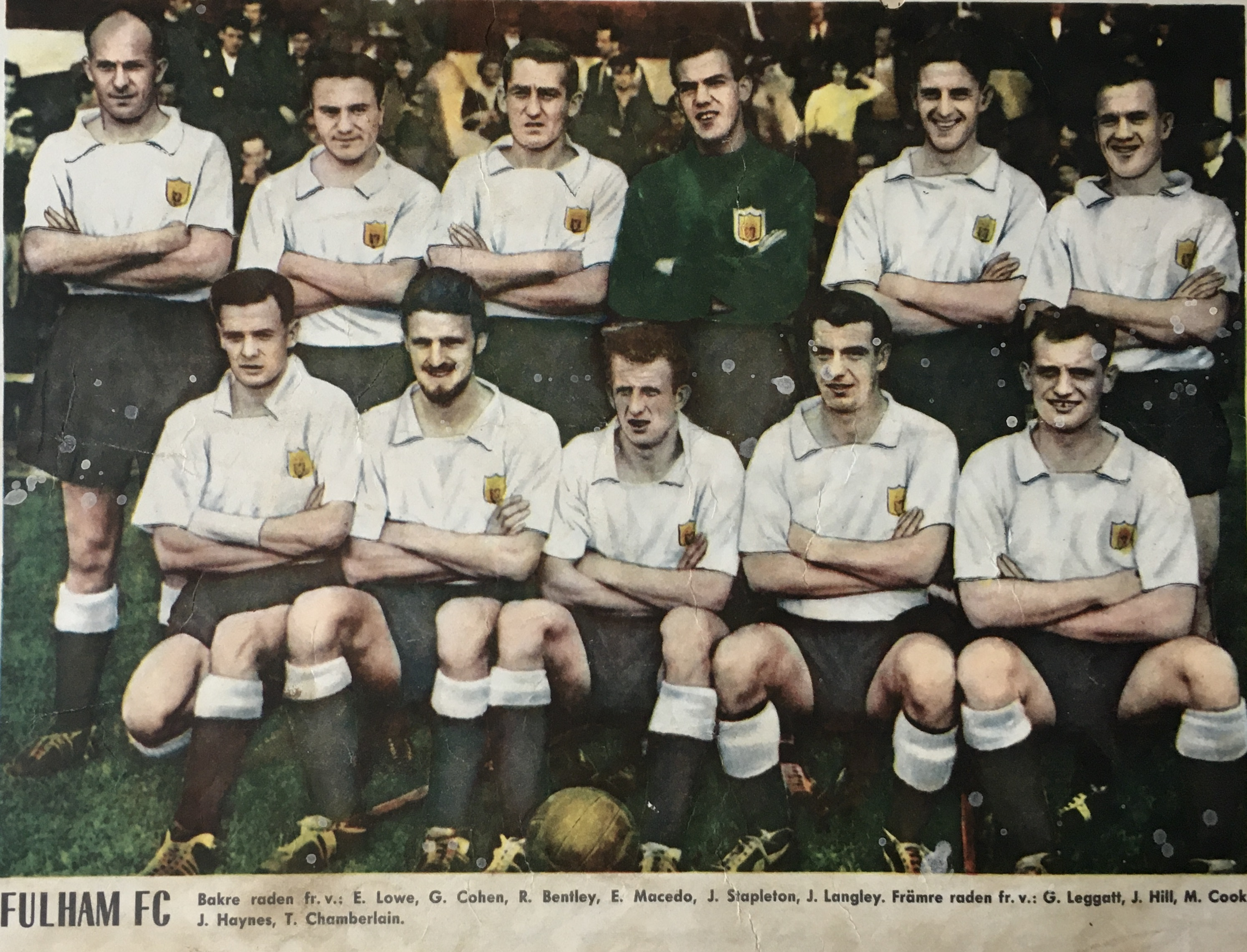

Personal information
- Full name: Roy Thomas Frank Bentley
- Date of birth: 17 May 1924
- Place of birth: Shirehampton, England
- Date of death: 20 April 2018 (aged 93)
- Position: Forward

Senior career*
Years	Team	Apps	(Gls)
1939–1946	Bristol City	0	(0)
1946–1948	Newcastle United	48	(22)
1948–1956	Chelsea	324	(130)
1956–1960	Fulham	142	(23)
1960–1962	Queens Park Rangers	45	(0)
Total		559	(175)

International career
1949–1955	England	12	(9)

Managerial career
- 1963–1968: Reading
- 1969–1972: Swansea City
- * Club domestic league appearances and goals

Roy Thomas Frank Bentley (17 May 1924 – 20 April 2018) was an English football player and manager.

A former forward, Bentley played 367 games for Chelsea and captained the club to their first League Championship in the 1954–55 season. He also won 12 caps for the England national side.

== Personal life ==
Bentley was born in Shirehampton, Bristol, Gloucestershire and attended Portway Boys Secondary School.

He married Violet M. Upton in 1946.

== Club career ==
=== Early years ===
Bentley served in the Royal Navy during the Second World War and afterwards played for both Bristol City and Bristol Rovers before signing for Newcastle United in 1946. He was with the club for less than two years, but formed a key part of a forward line which also included Jackie Milburn, Len Shackleton and Charlie Wayman. He reached an FA Cup semi-final with the club in the 1946–47 season, but they were defeated 4–0 by eventual winners Charlton Athletic.

=== Chelsea ===
In January 1948 Bentley signed for London side Chelsea for £11,000, partially because he had been advised by his doctor that a move south would be a remedy for the lung problems from which he occasionally suffered. He arrived at Chelsea as a replacement for Tommy Lawton, who had also moved to Chelsea in search of a cure for lung trouble, and was initially compared unfavourably with his predecessor. His Chelsea career took off slowly as he struggled to adapt to an unfamiliar style of play. They lost 2–4 at home to Huddersfield Town on his debut and he scored just three goals in his first four months with the club.

From there, however, Bentley's fortunes changed. He was an early exponent of the deep-lying centre forward position, an unorthodox tactic which often unsettled opposing defenders. This, combined with a strong heading ability and a powerful shot, saw him score 23 goals in his first full season with Chelsea, making him the club's top scorer, for which he also earned his first England call-up. Though Chelsea's league form during his time there was often patchy, he played a key part in their first major FA Cup run for almost two decades in 1950. He scored two goals in a 3–0 fifth round win against Chesterfield while in the quarter-final against Manchester United his thunderous shot from 30 yards clinched a 2–0 win. Chelsea were eventually knocked out in the semi-finals by Arsenal, despite Bentley giving them a 2–0 lead. During his time at Chelsea, he was picked for the London XI in the Inter-Cities Fairs Cup.

After another semi-final loss in 1952, again to Arsenal, Ted Drake arrived as Chelsea's new manager. Within three years, Bentley had captained Chelsea to their first League title, in 1954–55. In addition to being captain, he scored 21 league goals during the season, including a hat-trick against Newcastle and two strikes in a 4–3 win against principal rivals Wolverhampton Wanderers. Bentley remained with Chelsea for only one more season and was one of the first to leave as the ageing championship-winning side was gradually broken up by Drake.

Bentley scored 150 goals in 367 appearances for Chelsea. At the time, this made him the club's leading goalscorer. He is presently joint-fifth in Chelsea's all-time goalscorers list behind Frank Lampard, Bobby Tambling, Kerry Dixon and Didier Drogba, and level with Peter Osgood. He was Chelsea's top scorer in each of his eight full seasons at Stamford Bridge.

=== Fulham and QPR ===
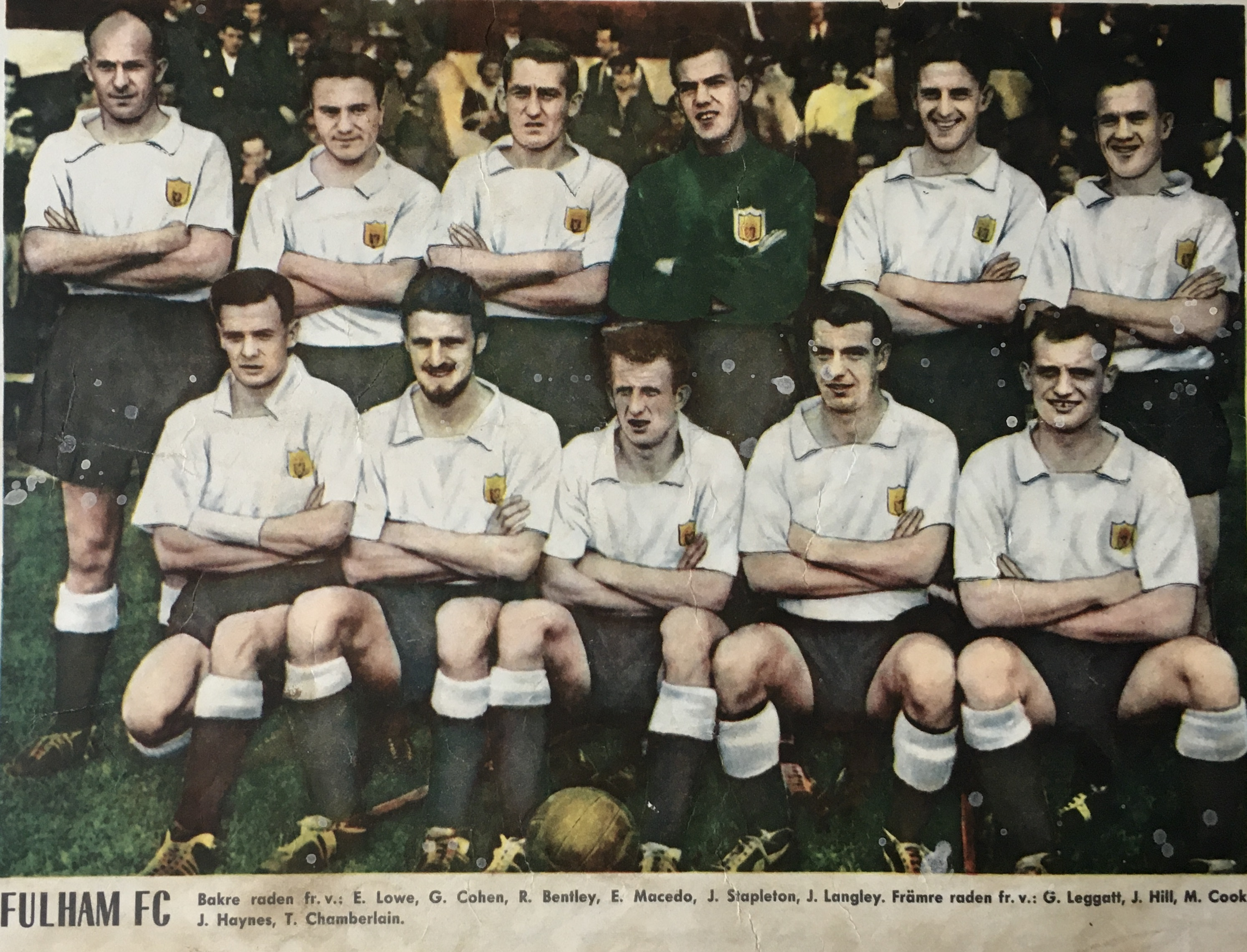
Fulham F.C. at 1958 with following players, from left standing: Eddie Lowe, George Cohen, Roy Bentley, Tony Macedo, Joe Stapleton, Jim Langley; front row: Graham Leggat, J. Hill, M. Cook, Johnny Haynes and Tosh Chamberlain.

Bentley signed for Chelsea's West London neighbours Fulham in 1956. At Fulham Bentley was converted into a centre-half and they reached the FA Cup semi-finals in 1958, where he was once again on the losing side. In 1960 he left Fulham but again stayed in West London, this time moving to Queens Park Rangers, where he saw out the remainder of his playing career.

== International career ==
Bentley was an England international for six years. He made his debut against Sweden and played for his country at the 1950 FIFA World Cup, including the 1–0 defeat to the USA. He scored the winning goal against Scotland in qualifying for that tournament. Although both finalists were guaranteed places in the World Cup (the top two finishers in the British Home Championships would qualify for the World Cup), the SFA had said that if they did not win the Home Nations, they would withdraw from the World Cup. As Scotland lost due to Bentley's goal, they withdrew and he was duly christened "the man who robbed Scotland of Rio." In November 1954 he scored a hat-trick against Wales. He earned twelve England caps and scored nine goals. Bentley was the last surviving member of England's 1950 World Cup squad.

== Managerial career ==
Following his retirement from playing, Bentley moved into management. He took over at Reading and later Swansea City, winning promotion to the old Third Division with the latter. He returned to Reading in 1977, this time as club secretary.

== Retirement and death ==
Bentley lived in Chigwell, Essex during the late 1980s before relocating to Reading, Berkshire where he lived in 2014. At his death in April 2018, he was the last surviving player from England's 1950 World Cup squad.

== Playing statistics ==
=== Club ===
Appearances and goals by club, season and competition
Club	Season	League			FA Cup		Other		Total	
Club	Season	Division	Apps	Goals	Apps	Goals	Apps	Goals	Apps	Goals
Bristol City	1945–46	–	0	0	6	1	0	0	6	1
Newcastle United	1946–47	Second Division	36	19	6	3	0	0	42	22
Newcastle United	1947–48	Second Division	12	3	0	0	0	0	12	3
Newcastle United	Total		48	22	6	3	0	0	54	25
Chelsea	1947–48	First Division	14	3	1	0	0	0	15	3
Chelsea	1948–49	First Division	40	21	3	2	0	0	43	23
Chelsea	1949–50	First Division	39	17	6	5	0	0	45	22
Chelsea	1950–51	First Division	38	8	5	3	0	0	43	11
Chelsea	1951–52	First Division	32	12	9	5	0	0	41	17
Chelsea	1952–53	First Division	37	12	7	5	0	0	44	17
Chelsea	1953–54	First Division	41	21	1	0	0	0	42	21
Chelsea	1954–55	First Division	41	22	3	0	0	0	44	22
Chelsea	1955–56	First Division	38	14	7	1	1	1	46	16
Chelsea	1956–57	First Division	4	0	0	0	0	0	4	0
Chelsea	Total		324	130	42	21	1	1	367	152
Fulham	1956–57	Second Division	32	14	2	1	0	0	34	15
Fulham	1957–58	Second Division	31	7	7	1	0	0	38	8
Fulham	1958–59	Second Division	35	0	4	0	0	0	39	0
Fulham	1959–60	First Division	29	2	2	0	0	0	31	2
Fulham	1960–61	First Division	15	0	0	0	1	0	16	0
Fulham	Total		142	23	15	2	1	0	158	25
Queens Park Rangers	1961–62	Third Division	29	0	4	0	1	0	34	0
Queens Park Rangers	1962–63	Third Division	16	0	2	0	0	0	18	0
Queens Park Rangers	Total		45	0	6	0	1	0	52	0
Career total			559	175	75	27	3	1	637	203

=== International ===
Appearances and goals by national team and year
National team	Year	Apps	Goals
England	1949	1	0
England	1950	5	2
England	1951	0	0
England	1952	2	1
England	1953	0	0
England	1954	2	4
England	1955	2	2
Total		12	9

== Managerial statistics ==
Managerial record by team and tenure
Team	From	To	Record					Ref
Team	From	To	P	W	D	L	Win %	Ref
Reading	1 January 1963	1 February 1969	321	136	79	106	42.4	
Swansea City	7 August 1969	16 October 1972	173	66	49	58	38.2	
Total			494	202	128	164	40.9	

== Bibliography ==
- Cheshire, Scott (1998). Chelsea: An Illustrated History. Breedon Books. ISBN 1-85983-143-5.
- Mears, Brian (2004). Chelsea: A 100-year History. Mainstream Sport. ISBN 1-84018-823-5.
