= 1949–50 Chelsea F.C. season =

English football club season

Chelsea
1949–50 season
- Chairman: Joe Mears
- Manager: Billy Birrell
- Stadium: Stamford Bridge
- First Division: 13th
- FA Cup: Semi-finals
- Top goalscorer: League: Roy Bentley (17); Hugh Billington (17); All: Roy Bentley (22)
- Highest home attendance: 70,362 vs Manchester United (4 March 1950)
- Lowest home attendance: 24,677 vs Newcastle United (29 April 1950)
- Average home league attendance: 42,243
- Biggest win: 3–0 (five matches)
- Biggest defeat: 0–4 v Portsmouth (25 March 1950); 0–4 v Aston Villa (8 April 1950)
| Home colours | Away colours |

The 1949–50 season was Chelsea Football Club's thirty-sixth competitive season. The club finished 13th in the First Division for the second consecutive season. They also reached the semi-finals of the FA Cup, where they lost to Arsenal after a replay.

== Table ==
| Pos | Team | Pld | W | D | L | GF | GA | GAv | Pts |
|---|---|---|---|---|---|---|---|---|---|
| 11 | Derby County | 42 | 17 | 10 | 15 | 69 | 61 | 1.131 | 44 |
| 12 | Aston Villa | 42 | 15 | 12 | 15 | 61 | 61 | 1.000 | 42 |
| 13 | Chelsea | 42 | 12 | 16 | 14 | 58 | 65 | 0.892 | 40 |
| 14 | West Bromwich Albion | 42 | 14 | 12 | 16 | 47 | 53 | 0.887 | 40 |
| 15 | Huddersfield Town | 42 | 14 | 9 | 19 | 52 | 73 | 0.712 | 37 |

Source: World Football
Rules for classification: 1) Points; 2) Goal average; 3) Goals scored
