= 1948–49 Chelsea F.C. season =

English football club season

Chelsea
1948–49 season
- Chairman: Joe Mears
- Manager: Billy Birrell
- Stadium: Stamford Bridge
- First Division: 13th
- FA Cup: Fifth round
- Top goalscorer: League: Roy Bentley (20); All: Roy Bentley (22)
- Highest home attendance: 77,696 vs Blackpool (16 October 1948)
- Lowest home attendance: 25,864 vs Sunderland (18 April 1949)
- Average home league attendance: 47,652
- Biggest win: 6–0 v Everton (11 September 1948)
- Biggest defeat: 2–5 v Portsmouth (27 December 1948)
Home colours	Away colours

The 1948–49 season was Chelsea Football Club's thirty-fifth competitive season. Chelsea finished 13th in the First Division and reached the fifth round of the FA Cup. The season also saw the arrival of Roy Bentley, who would become, at the time, the club's leading goalscorer.

== Table ==
Pos	Team	Pld	W	D	L	GF	GA	GAv	Pts
11	Stoke City	42	16	9	17	66	68	0.971	41
12	Liverpool	42	13	14	15	53	43	1.233	40
13	Chelsea	42	12	14	16	69	68	1.015	38
14	Bolton Wanderers	42	14	10	18	59	68	0.868	38
15	Burnley	42	12	14	16	43	50	0.860	38

Source: World Football
Rules for classification: 1) Points; 2) Goal average; 3) Goals scored
