= Tom White (footballer, born 1939) =

Scottish footballer (1939–2019)

Personal information
- Full name: Thomas White
- Date of birth: 12 August 1939
- Place of birth: Musselburgh, Scotland
- Date of death: 17 December 2019 (aged 80)
- Position: Forward

Youth career
- –1959: Bonnyrigg Rose Athletic

Senior career*
Years	Team	Apps	(Gls)
1959–1962	Raith Rovers	30	(11)
1962–1963	St Mirren	35	(20)
1963–1965	Hearts	37	(30)
1965–1966	Aberdeen	14	(4)
1966–1968	Crystal Palace	39	(13)
1968–1969	Blackpool	34	(9)
1969–1971	Bury	48	(13)
1971–1972	Crewe Alexandra	4	(0)
Total		241	(100)

International career
1964	SFL trial v SFA	1	(0)

Managerial career
- 1990: Blackpool (caretaker-manager)
- * Club domestic league appearances and goals

Thomas White (12 August 1939 – 17 December 2019) was a Scottish professional footballer. He played as a forward.

== Football career ==
A prolific scorer during his early career with Raith Rovers, White's time at Rovers was shortened by two years of National Service, during which time he played for the British Army. He also played for St Mirren, then managed by Jackie Cox. White joined Hearts for £8,000 in November 1963 and was soon dubbed "Goal-a-game White" by the local media. His attacking partnership with Willie Wallace was particularly effective and earned the sobriquet the "W-formation", White's abrasive, bustling style complementing Wallace. In tandem, they scored 48 goals during the 1963–64 season; however, White's progress was interrupted when he suffered severe injuries in a car crash in Wallyford.

White remained a regular in the Hearts side up until January 1965; however, with Donald Ford blossoming into first-team contention, manager Tommy Walker saw fit to allow White to go, and in June 1965 he moved to Aberdeen in an exchange deal for Don Kerrigan.

White moved to Crystal Palace, then playing in the Second Division, in May 1966, in a combined deal along with teammate John McCormick. He scored 14 times for Palace in 40 appearances, in all competitions, before moving to Blackpool in February 1968.

He finished his playing career with a short spell at Crewe Alexandra in 1971–72. He later became a director of Blackpool for 12 years only to be ousted by the then new chairman of the club, Owen Oyston.

== Personal life ==
White was the younger brother of John White and Eddie White, both professional footballers.

In July 1964 his 27-year-old brother John was killed at Crews Hill Golf Course, Enfield, by a lightning-strike. That year in November, White played in a testimonial match for his sibling for Tottenham Hotspur against a Scotland national side; 25,000 spectators paid their respects, as, despite White's goal, Scotland won 6–2.

=== Death ===
White died on 17 December 2019, aged 80.
