= 1961–62 Queens Park Rangers F.C. season =

English football club season

Queens Park Rangers
1961–62 season
- Chairman: Albert Hittinger
- Manager: Alec Stock
- Stadium: Loftus Road
- Football League Third Division: 4th
- FA Cup: Third Round
- Football League Cup: Second round
- London Challenge Cup: Quarter finals
- Top goalscorer: League: Brian Bedford 34; All: Brian Bedford 39
- Highest home attendance: 18,003 v Crystal Palace (20 January 1962)
- Lowest home attendance: 7,087 v Port Vale (11 November 1961)
- Average home league attendance: 10,986
- Biggest win: 6–0 v Torquay (30 December 1961)
- Biggest defeat: 3–6 v Reading (21 August 1961)
Home colours	Away colours

The 1961–62 Queens Park Rangers season was the club's 71st season of existence and their 10th back in the Football League Third Division following their relegation in the 1951–52 season. QPR finished 4th in their league campaign, missing promotion back to the second division by three points. QPR were eliminated in the third round of the FA Cup.

Club record scorer Brian Bedford lead the way with 34 league goals, as the club set a single season record of 111 goals scored across the league campaign.

== League standings ==
Pos	Team	Pld	W	D	L	GF	GA	GAv	Pts	Promotion or relegation
2	Grimsby Town (P)	46	28	6	12	80	56	1.429	62	Promotion to the Second Division
3	Bournemouth & Boscombe Athletic	46	21	17	8	69	45	1.533	59	
4	Queens Park Rangers	46	24	11	11	111	73	1.521	59	
5	Peterborough United	46	26	6	14	107	82	1.305	58	
6	Bristol City	46	23	8	15	94	72	1.306	54	

(P) Promoted

== Results ==
QPR scores given first

Win Draw Loss

=== Third Division ===
Date	Opponents	Venue	Result F–A	Scorers	Attendance	Position
19 August 1961	Brentford	H	3–0	Towers, Bedford, Evans	16,796	4
21 August 1961	Reading	H	3–6	Angell, Lazarus 2	12,847	12
26 August 1961	Barnsley	A	4–2	Bedford, Angell (pen), Towers, Evans	7,668	10
30 August 1961	Reading	A	2–0	Towers 2	20,003	9
2 September 1961	Portsmouth	H	0–1		13,010	8
4 September 1961	Swindon	H	6–1	Towers (5', 21'), Barber (57'),Evans (66'),Lazarus (81', 84')	10,255	6
9 September 1961	Crystal Palace	A	2–2	Lazarus 2	27,179	5
16 September 1961	Bournemouth & Boscombe Ath.	H	1–1	Lazarus	13,088	6
18 September 1961	Halifax	A	PP			
23 September 1961	Watford	A	2–3	Towers, McClelland	15,555	8
25 September 1961	Halifax	H	6–2	Bedford 3, Evans 2, McClelland	11,907	8
30 September 1961	Hull City	H	1–1	Francis	10,076	9
4 October 1961	Lincoln City	A	pp			
7 October 1961	Newport	A	4–2	McClelland, Bedford, Barber, Evans	5,440	7
9 October 1961	Lincoln City	H	1–3	Evans	10,151	7
14 October 1961	Southend	H	5–3	Bedford 4, Angell (pen)	10,665	7
17 October 1961	Swindon	A	0–0		11,320	5
21 October 1961	Grimsby Town	A	1–1	Collins	6,630	6
28 October 1961	Coventry City	H	4–1	Barber 2, Bedford, Evans	10,008	4
11 November 1961	Port Vale	H	2–1	Bedford, Angell (pen)	7,087	4
18 November 1961	Bristol City	A	0–2		10,892	7
2 December 1961	Notts County	A	0–0		7,980	7
9 December 1961	Shrewsbury	H	3–1	Bedford 3	7,433	6
16 December 1961	Brentford	A	4–1	Bedford 2, Reeves (og), McClelland	11,771	6
26 December 1961	Torquay	A	2–2	McClelland, Keen	4,574	8
30 December 1961	Torquay	H	6–0	Evans 3, Towers 2, Collins	9,193	5
6 January 1962	Peterborough United	A	PP			
13 January 1962	Portsmouth	A	1–4	Towers	17,727	6
20 January 1962	Crystal Palace	H	1–0	Evans	18,003	4
27 January 1962	Bradford Park Avenue	H	PP			
3 February 1962	Bournemouth & Boscombe Ath.	A	1–3	Towers	11,645	7
10 February 1962	Watford	H	1–2	McClelland	11,288	8
16 February 1962	Hull City	A	1–3	Bedford	3,237	8
19 February 1962	Peterborough United	A	1–5	Collins	11,922	10
24 February 1962	Newport	H	4–0	Bedford, McClelland, Lazarus 2	7,813	10
3 March 1962	Southend United	A	3–2	Bedford, Collins, Shields (og)	8,298	8
10 March 1962	Grimsby Town	H	3–2	Bedford 2, Angell	8,490	7
16 March 1962	Coventry City	A	3–2	Bedford 3	8,629	5
19 March 1962	Barnsley	H	3–0	Keen, Bedford, Evans	10,310	5
24 March 1962	Peterborough United	H	3–3	Evans, McClelland, Bedford	13,430	5
31 March 1962	Port Vale	A	3–2	Collins, Bedford, Angell (pen)	4,936	5
2 April 1962	Halifax	A	PP			
7 April 1962	Bristol City	H	4–1	Evans 2, Bedford 2	11,482	4
11 April 1962	Bradford Park Avenue	H	1–2	Lazarus	11,462	6
14 April 1962	Bradford Park Avenue	A	3–3	Bedford 3	8,744	6
21 April 1962	Notts County	H	2–0	Bedford, McClelland	10,043	5
23 April 1962	Northampton	H	2–0	Evans, Towers	10,953	5
24 April 1962	Northampton	A	1–1	McClelland	12,533	4
28 April 1962	Shrewsbury	A	2–1	Towers, McClelland	5,823	4
30 April 1962	Lincoln City	A	5–0	Lazarus 2, Towers 2, Collins	6,815	4
3 May 1962	Halifax	A	1–1	Evans	2,316	4

=== London Challenge Cup ===
Date	Round	Opponents	H / A	Result F–A	Scorers	Attendance
2 October 1961	First Round	Bexleyheath & Welling	H	4–0		
16 October 1961	Quarter-Finals	Tottenham Hotspur	A	0–5		

=== Football League Cup ===
Date	Round	Opponents	H / A	Result F–A	Scorers	Attendance
13 September 1961	First Round	Crystal Palace (Third Division)	H	5–2	Bedford 2, Angell (pen), Francis 2	10,565
11 October 1961	Second Round	Nottingham Forest (First Division)	H	1–2	Towers	11,198

=== FA Cup ===
Date	Round	Opponents	H / A	Result F–A	Scorers	Attendance
4 November 1961	First Round	Barry Town (Southern Football League division one)	A	1–1	McLellan (og)	5500
6 November 1961	First Round Replay	Barry Town (Southern Football League division one)	H	7–0	Bedford 3, Evans 2, Collins 2	11,328
25 November 1961	Second Round	Ashford Town (Southern Football League division one)	A	3–0	McClelland, Evans, Collins	5000
6 January 1962	Third Round	Burnley (First Division)	A	1–6	Evans	28,352

== Friendlies ==
Date	Opponents	Score
9-Aug-61	Aldershot v Queens Park Rangers	
12-Aug-61	Queens Park Rangers v Brighton and Hove Albion	
15-Aug-61	Brighton and Hove Albion v Queens Park Rangers	
27-Jan-62	Queens Park Rangers v Chelsea	

== Squad ==
Position	Nationality	Name	League Appearances	League Goals	Cup Appearances	League.Cup Goals	F.A.Cup Goals	Total Appearances	Total Goals
GK	(England)	Ray Drinkwater	47		4			51	
GK	(England)	Rodney Slack	1					1	
DF	(England)	Tony Ingham	42		2			44	
DF	(England)	Keith Rutter	45		4			49	
DF	(England)	Roy Bentley	30		4			34	
MF	(England)	John McClelland	38	11	4	1		42	12
MF	(England)	David Cockell	1					1	
MF	(England)	Mike Keen	48	2	4			52	2
MF	(England)	Sylvan Anderton	4					4	
MF	(England)	Mark Lazarus	25	12				25	12
MF	(England)	Bill Williams	20		2			22	
MF	(England)	John Collins	26	6	4	3		30	9
MF	(England)	Peter Angell	41	6	4		1	45	7
FW	(England)	Mike Barber	26	4	1			27	4
FW	(England)	George Francis	2	1	1		2	3	3
FW	(Wales)	Brian Bedford	45	34	4	3	2	49	39
FW	(England)	Bernard Evans	44	18	4	4		48	22
FW	(England)	Jim Towers	29	15	3		1	32	16
FW	(Wales)	Jimmy Andrews	4					4	

== Transfers In ==
Name	from	Date	Fee
Bill Smith		July 1961	
Eric Pattison *	Brisbane (Aus)	28 August 1961	
John McClelland	Lincoln City	23 September 1961	£14,000
Peter Hobbs		December 1961	
Sylvan Anderton	Chelsea	19 January 1962	£5,000
Mark Lazarus	Wolverhampton Wanderers	23 February 1962	£16,000
Brian Taylor	QPR Juniors	March 1962	
Frank Smith	Tottenham Hotspur	21 May 1962	
Peter Springett	QPR Juniors	May 1962	
Frank Large	Halifax Town	June 1962	£8,000

== Transfers Out ==
Name	from	Date	Fee	Date	Club	Fee
Donald Tomkins		10 February 1960		July? 1961	Welsh league	
Tony Newcombe	Marlow	4 February 1957		July? 1961	Gravesend	
David Pollard		July ?1959		July? 1961	Leicestershire league	
Jimmy Turner		July 1960		July? 1961	Wisbech Town	
Derrick Razzell *	Carshalton	4 March 1960		August 1961	Margate	
George Francis	Brentford	May 1961	£8,000*	October 1961	Brentford	
Mark Lazarus	Orient	September 1960	£3,000	September 1961	Wolverhampton Wanderers	£27,500
Alan Eagles	Colchester	15 August 1961		November 1961	Aldershot	
Charlie Townsend *	Wealdstone	21 September 1961	Free	November 1961	Wealdstone	Free
Alan Jones *		January 1960		December 1961	Hendon	Free
Mike Bottoms	Harrow Town	July 1960		January 1962	Oxford	Free
Maurice Williams *	Harrow Town	29 January 1960		April 1962	Hendon	Free
Derek Grace **				April 1962	Exeter	Free
Rodney Slack	Leicester City	March 1961		May 1962	Cambridge United	
Sylvan Anderton	Chelsea	January 1962		May 1962	Dover Town	
David Baker		6 April 1957		June? 1962		
Tom Fearey *	Hendon	February ?1961		June? 1962		
Roy Walker *		April ?1960		June? 1962		
Charlie Sells *		March ?1961		June? 1962	Hendon	
Eric Pattison *	Brisbane (Aus)	28 August 1961		June? 1962		
