= 1963–64 in Scottish football =

Division One champions
- Rangers

Division Two champions
- Morton

Scottish Cup winners
- Rangers

League Cup winners
- Rangers

Junior Cup winners
- Johnstone Burgh

Teams in Europe
- Celtic, Heart of Midlothian, Partick Thistle, Rangers

Scotland national team
- 1964 BHC

The 1963–64 season was the 91st season of competitive football in Scotland and the 67th season of the Scottish Football League.

== Scottish League Division One ==
Pos	Team	Pld	W	D	L	GF	GA	GR	Pts	Qualification or relegation
1	Rangers (C)	34	25	5	4	85	31	2.742	55	
2	Kilmarnock	34	22	5	7	77	40	1.925	49	
3	Celtic	34	19	9	6	89	34	2.618	47	
4	Hearts	34	19	9	6	74	40	1.850	47	
5	Dunfermline	34	18	9	7	64	33	1.939	45	
6	Dundee	34	20	5	9	94	50	1.880	45	
7	Partick Thistle	34	15	5	14	55	54	1.019	35	
8	Dundee United	34	13	8	13	65	49	1.327	34	
9	Aberdeen	34	12	8	14	53	53	1.000	32	
10	Hibernian	34	12	6	16	59	66	0.894	30	
11	Motherwell	34	9	11	14	51	62	0.823	29	
12	St Mirren	34	12	5	17	44	74	0.595	29	
13	St Johnstone	34	11	6	17	54	70	0.771	28	
14	Falkirk	34	11	6	17	54	84	0.643	28	
15	Airdrieonians	34	11	4	19	52	97	0.536	26	
16	Third Lanark	34	9	7	18	47	74	0.635	25	
17	Queen of the South (R)	34	5	6	23	40	92	0.435	16	Relegated to the Second Division
18	East Stirlingshire (R)	34	5	2	27	37	91	0.407	12	Relegated to the Second Division

Source: RSSSF
(C) Champions; (R) Relegated

Champions: Rangers
Relegated: Queen of the South, East Stirlingshire

== Scottish League Division Two ==
Pos	Team	Pld	W	D	L	GF	GA	GD	Pts	Promotion or relegation
1	Morton	36	32	3	1	135	37	+98	67	Promotion to the 1964–65 First Division
2	Clyde	36	22	9	5	81	44	+37	53	Promotion to the 1964–65 First Division
3	Arbroath	36	20	6	10	79	46	+33	46	
4	East Fife	36	16	13	7	92	57	+35	45	
5	Montrose	36	19	6	11	79	57	+22	44	
6	Dumbarton	36	16	6	14	67	59	+8	38	
7	Queen's Park	36	17	4	15	57	54	+3	38	
8	Stranraer	36	16	6	14	71	73	−2	38	
9	Albion Rovers	36	12	12	12	67	71	−4	36	
10	Raith Rovers	36	15	5	16	70	61	+9	35	
11	Stenhousemuir	36	15	5	16	83	75	+8	35	
12	Berwick Rangers	36	10	10	16	68	84	−16	30	
13	Hamilton Academical	36	12	6	18	65	81	−16	30	
14	Ayr United	36	12	5	19	58	83	−25	29	
15	Brechin City	36	10	8	18	61	98	−37	28	
16	Alloa Athletic	36	11	5	20	64	92	−28	27	
17	Cowdenbeath	36	7	11	18	46	72	−26	25	
18	Forfar Athletic	36	6	8	22	57	104	−47	20	
19	Stirling Albion	36	6	8	22	47	99	−52	20	

Promoted: Greenock Morton, Clyde

In the league match between Forfar Athletic and East Fife on Wednesday, 22 April 1964, the result was Forfar 5, East Fife 4.

== Cup honours ==
Competition	Winner	Score	Runner-up
Scottish Cup 1963–64	Rangers	3 – 1	Dundee
League Cup 1963–64	Rangers	5 – 0	Morton
Junior Cup	Johnstone Burgh	3 – 0 (rep.)	Cambuslang Rangers

== Other honours ==
=== National ===
Competition	Winner	Score	Runner-up
Scottish Qualifying Cup - North	Elgin City	8 – 5 *	Clachnacuddin
Scottish Qualifying Cup - South	Edinburgh University	4 – 3 *	Peebles Rovers

=== County ===
Competition	Winner	Score	Runner-up
Aberdeenshire Cup	Fraserburgh		
East of Scotland Shield	Hearts	3 – 0	Hibernian
Fife Cup	Dunfermline Athletic	5 – 1 *	East Fife
Forfarshire Cup	Dundee United	4 – 0	Montrose
Glasgow Cup	Celtic	2 – 0	Clyde
Lanarkshire Cup	Motherwell	3 – 1	Hamilton
Renfrewshire Cup	Morton	6 – 4 *	St Mirren
Stirlingshire Cup	Falkirk	7 – 0	Stenhousemuir

^{*} - aggregate over two legs

=== Highland League ===
Top Three
Pos	Team	Pld	W	D	L	GF	GA	GD	Pts
1	Inverness Caledonian	30	20	4	6	90	47	+43	44
2	Nairn County	30	19	5	6	92	52	+40	43
3	Keith	30	17	6	7	83	61	+22	40

== Scotland national team ==
Date	Venue	Opponents	Score	Competition	Scotland scorer(s)
12 October 1963	Windsor Park, Belfast (A)	Northern Ireland	1–2	BHC	Ian St. John
7 November 1963	Hampden Park, Glasgow (H)	Norway	6–1	Friendly	Denis Law (4), Dave Mackay (2)
20 November 1963	Hampden Park, Glasgow (H)	Wales	2–1	BHC	John White, Denis Law
11 April 1964	Hampden Park, Glasgow (H)	England	1–0	BHC	Alan Gilzean
12 May 1964	Niedersachsenstadion, Hanover (A)	West Germany	2–2	Friendly	Alan Gilzean (2)

- Scotland shared the 1964 British Home Championship with England and Northern Ireland.

Key:

- (H) = Home match
- (A) = Away match
- BHC = British Home Championship
