= 1939–40 Chelsea F.C. season =

English football club season

Chelsea
1939–40 season
- Chairman: Lt. Col Charles Chrisp
- Manager: Billy Birrell
- Stadium: Stamford Bridge
- First Division: 12th
- Football League War Cup: First round
Home colours	Away colours

The 1939–40 season was Chelsea Football Club's thirty-first competitive season. The Football League season was abandoned after three matches due to the outbreak of the Second World War and the FA Cup was not contested. For the next six years, the club instead competed in unofficial regional leagues, which are not considered competitive. Chelsea finished 3rd in League South B and subsequently finished 9th in an additional competition, League South C
