= 1950–51 Chelsea F.C. season =

English football club season

Chelsea
1950–51 season
- Chairman: Joe Mears
- Manager: Billy Birrell
- Stadium: Stamford Bridge
- First Division: 20th
- FA Cup: Fifth round
- Top goalscorer: League: Roy Bentley (8); All: Roy Bentley (11)
- Highest home attendance: 69,434 vs Fulham (10 February 1951)
- Lowest home attendance: 23,723 vs Burnley (26 March 1951)
- Average home league attendance: 39,667
- Biggest win: 0–4 v Sheffield Wednesday (19 Aug 1950); 0–4 v Bolton Wanderers (5 May 1951)
- Biggest defeat: 1–4 v Portsmouth (26 Dec 1950); 1–4 v Manchester United (31 March 1951)
Home colours	Away colours

The 1950–51 season was Chelsea Football Club's thirty-seventh competitive season. The club struggled throughout the season and ultimately finished 20th in the First Division. Chelsea were six points adrift at the bottom of the table with four matches remaining, but they won all four matches to avoid relegation on goal average, by 0.044 of a goal.

== Table ==
Pos	Team	Pld	W	D	L	GF	GA	GAv	Pts	Relegation
18	Fulham	42	13	11	18	52	68	0.765	37	
19	Huddersfield Town	42	15	6	21	64	92	0.696	36	
20	Chelsea	42	12	8	22	53	65	0.815	32	
21	Sheffield Wednesday (R)	42	12	8	22	64	83	0.771	32	Relegation to the Second Division
22	Everton (R)	42	12	8	22	48	86	0.558	32	Relegation to the Second Division

Source: World Football
Rules for classification: 1) Points; 2) Goal average; 3) Goals scored
(R) Relegated
