= 1947–48 Chelsea F.C. season =

English football club season

Chelsea
1947–48 season
- Chairman: Joe Mears
- Manager: Billy Birrell
- Stadium: Stamford Bridge
- First Division: 18th
- FA Cup: Fourth round
- Top goalscorer: League: Ken Armstrong/ Bobby Campbell (11); All: Ken Armstrong (13)
- Highest home attendance: 67,789 vs Aston Villa (4 October 1947)
- Lowest home attendance: 30,085 vs Sunderland (10 September 1947)
- Average home league attendance: 47,652
- Biggest win: 5–0 v Barrow (10 January 1948)
- Biggest defeat: 0–5 v Manchester United (17 April 1948)
Home colours	Away colours

The 1947–48 season was Chelsea Football Club's thirty-fourth competitive season.

== Table ==
Pos	Team	Pld	W	D	L	GF	GA	GAv	Pts
16	Middlesbrough	42	14	9	19	71	73	0.973	37
17	Bolton Wanderers	42	16	5	21	46	58	0.793	37
18	Chelsea	42	14	9	19	53	71	0.746	37
19	Huddersfield Town	42	12	12	18	51	60	0.850	36
20	Sunderland	42	13	10	19	56	67	0.836	36

Source: World Football
Rules for classification: 1) Points; 2) Goal average; 3) Goals scored
