= 1951–52 Chelsea F.C. season =

English football club season

Chelsea
1951–52 season
- Chairman: Joe Mears
- Manager: Billy Birrell
- Stadium: Stamford Bridge
- First Division: 19th
- FA Cup: Semi-finals
- Top goalscorer: League: Roy Bentley and Jimmy D'Arcy (12); All: Roy Bentley (17)
- Highest home attendance: 60,840 vs Leeds United (27 February 1952)
- Lowest home attendance: 25,165 vs Huddersfield Town (15 September 1951)
- Average home league attendance: 39,932
- Biggest win: 5–0 v Middlesbrough (16 February 1952)
- Biggest defeat: 1–7 v Aston Villa (15 April 1952)
Home colours	Away colours

The 1951–52 season was Chelsea Football Club's thirty-eighth competitive season. The club once more struggled in the First Division and finished 19th. In the FA Cup, Chelsea reached the semi-finals for the second time in three years, and once again lost to Arsenal after a replay. Manager Billy Birrell retired at the end of the season and was replaced by Ted Drake.

== Table ==
Pos	Team	Pld	W	D	L	GF	GA	GAv	Pts	Relegation
17	Derby County	42	15	7	20	63	80	0.788	37	
18	Middlesbrough	42	15	6	21	64	88	0.727	36	
19	Chelsea	42	14	8	20	52	72	0.722	36	
20	Stoke City	42	12	7	23	49	88	0.557	31	
21	Huddersfield Town (R)	42	10	8	24	49	82	0.598	28	Relegation to the Second Division

Source: World Football
Rules for classification: 1) Points; 2) Goal average; 3) Goals scored
(R) Relegated
