= 1955–56 Chelsea F.C. season =

English football club season

Chelsea
1955–56 season
- Chairman: Joe Mears
- Manager: Ted Drake
- Stadium: Stamford Bridge
- First Division: 16th
- FA Cup: Fifth round
- FA Charity Shield: Winners
- European Cup: DNP
- Top goalscorer: League: Roy Bentley (14); All: Roy Bentley (16)
- Highest home attendance: 48,273 vs Portsmouth (3 September 1955)
- Lowest home attendance: 12,802 vs Newcastle United (14 September 1955)
- Average home league attendance: 34,127
- Biggest win: 6–1 v Everton (14 April 1956)
- Biggest defeat: 0–5 v Burnley (10 March 1956)
Home colours	Away colours

The 1955–56 season was Chelsea Football Club's forty-second competitive season. Chelsea began the season as defending league champions and won the FA Charity Shield, but thereafter performed poorly and ultimately finished 16th in the First Division. The club were also due to participate in the inaugural edition of the European Champions' Cup, but withdrew from the competition after pressure from the Football League to which they had been elected in 1905–06, their first competitive season.

== Table ==
Pos	Team	Pld	W	D	L	GF	GA	GAv	Pts
14	Charlton Athletic	42	17	6	19	75	81	0.926	40
15	Everton	42	15	10	17	55	69	0.797	40
16	Chelsea	42	14	11	17	64	77	0.831	39
17	Cardiff City	42	15	9	18	55	69	0.797	39
18	Tottenham Hotspur	42	15	7	20	61	71	0.859	37

Source: World Football
Rules for classification: 1) Points; 2) Goal average; 3) Goals scored
