= 1978–79 Essex Senior Football League =

The 1978–79 season was the eighth in the history of Essex Senior Football League, a football competition in England.

The league featured 16 clubs which competed in the league last season, along with one new club:

- East Ham United, transferred from the London Spartan League

Basildon United were champions, winning their third Essex Senior League title in a row.

== League table ==
Essex Senior Football League
- Season: 1978–79
- Champions: Basildon United
- Matches played: 272
- Goals scored: 842 (3.1 per match)

| Pos | Team | Pld | W | D | L | GF | GA | GD | Pts | Promotion or relegation |
|---|---|---|---|---|---|---|---|---|---|---|
| 1 | Basildon United | 32 | 26 | 5 | 1 | 86 | 14 | +72 | 57 | |
| 2 | Canvey Island | 32 | 22 | 8 | 2 | 73 | 21 | +52 | 52 | |
| 3 | Eton Manor | 32 | 19 | 6 | 7 | 68 | 37 | +31 | 44 | |
| 4 | Heybridge Swifts | 32 | 17 | 9 | 6 | 50 | 32 | +18 | 43 | |
| 5 | Brentwood | 32 | 15 | 9 | 8 | 64 | 49 | +15 | 39 | |
| 6 | East Ham United | 32 | 16 | 6 | 10 | 57 | 42 | +15 | 38 | |
| 7 | Witham Town | 32 | 14 | 7 | 11 | 47 | 43 | +4 | 35 | |
| 8 | Tiptree United | 32 | 11 | 11 | 10 | 42 | 32 | +10 | 33 | Transferred to the Eastern Counties League |
| 9 | Brightlingsea United | 32 | 12 | 9 | 11 | 53 | 51 | +2 | 33 | |
| 10 | Bowers United | 32 | 12 | 8 | 12 | 41 | 47 | −6 | 32 | |
| 11 | Chelmsford City reserves | 32 | 11 | 6 | 15 | 41 | 47 | −6 | 28 | Resigned from the league |
| 12 | Maldon Town | 32 | 7 | 14 | 11 | 43 | 60 | −17 | 28 | |
| 13 | Woodford Town | 32 | 10 | 7 | 15 | 46 | 62 | −16 | 27 | Transferred to the Athenian League |
| 14 | Ford United | 32 | 4 | 9 | 19 | 28 | 47 | −19 | 17 | |
| 15 | Stansted | 32 | 7 | 2 | 23 | 34 | 72 | −38 | 16 | |
| 16 | Coggeshall Town | 32 | 2 | 10 | 20 | 40 | 82 | −42 | 14 | |
| 17 | Sawbridgeworth Town | 32 | 3 | 2 | 27 | 29 | 104 | −75 | 8 | |

Source: fchd
Rules for classification: 1) points; 2) goal difference; 3) number of goals scored.
