= 1979–80 Eastern Counties Football League =

The 1979–80 season was the second under this name and the 38th in the history of Eastern Counties Football League a football competition in England.

The league featured 21 clubs which competed in the league last season, along with one new club:

- Tiptree United, transferred from the Essex Senior League

Gorleston were champions, winning their third Eastern Counties Football League title.

== League table ==
Town & Country League
- Season: 1979–80
- Champions: Gorleston
- Matches: 462
- Goals: 1,399 (3.03 per match)

Pos	Team	Pld	W	D	L	GF	GA	GD	Pts
1	Gorleston	42	25	13	4	86	31	+55	63
2	Tiptree United	42	27	8	7	69	35	+34	62
3	Wisbech Town	42	26	5	11	87	53	+34	57
4	Sudbury Town	42	23	11	8	70	46	+24	57
5	Bury Town	42	19	13	10	92	65	+27	51
6	Brantham Athletic	42	17	14	11	52	47	+5	48
7	Lowestoft Town	42	19	9	14	74	55	+19	47
8	Newmarket Town	42	17	13	12	72	69	+3	47
9	Great Yarmouth Town	42	15	13	14	69	55	+14	43
10	Soham Town Rangers	42	16	10	16	71	72	−1	42
11	Thetford Town	42	14	14	14	66	68	−2	42
12	Ely City	42	12	17	13	60	50	+10	41
13	Histon	42	14	12	16	45	57	−12	40
14	Clacton Town	42	14	11	17	48	51	−3	39
15	March Town United	42	13	13	16	70	75	−5	39
16	Colchester United reserves	42	13	12	17	80	82	−2	38
17	Haverhill Rovers	42	13	11	18	60	68	−8	37
18	Felixstowe Town	42	12	10	20	52	68	−16	34
19	Stowmarket	42	8	17	17	49	71	−22	33
20	Saffron Walden Town	42	7	11	24	41	76	−35	25
21	Chatteris Town	42	7	9	26	47	98	−51	23
22	Braintree & Crittall Athletic	42	5	6	31	39	107	−68	16

Source: fchd
Rules for classification: 1) points; 2) goal difference; 3) number of goals scored.
