= 1953–54 Chelsea F.C. season =

English football club season

Chelsea
1953–54 season
- Chairman: Joe Mears
- Manager: Ted Drake
- Stadium: Stamford Bridge
- First Division: 8th
- FA Cup: Third round
- Top goalscorer: League: Roy Bentley (21); All: Roy Bentley (21)
- Highest home attendance: 61,336 vs Cardiff City (26 December 1953)
- Lowest home attendance: 23,513 vs Middlesbrough (17 October 1953)
- Average home league attendance: 46,944
- Biggest win: 5–0 v West Bromwich Albion (17 March 1954)
- Biggest defeat: 1–8 v Wolverhampton Wanderers (26 September 1953)
Home colours	Away colours

The 1953–54 season was Chelsea Football Club's fortieth competitive season. The club finished 8th in the First Division and were knocked out in the third round of the FA Cup. In September, Chelsea lost 8–1 to Wolverhampton Wanderers, which remains the club's heaviest defeat in a league match.

== Table ==
Pos	Team	Pld	W	D	L	GF	GA	GAv	Pts
6	Blackpool	42	19	10	13	80	69	1.159	48
7	Burnley	42	21	4	17	78	67	1.164	46
8	Chelsea	42	16	12	14	74	68	1.088	44
9	Charlton Athletic	42	19	6	17	75	77	0.974	44
10	Cardiff City	42	18	8	16	51	71	0.718	44

Source: World Football
Rules for classification: 1) Points; 2) Goal average; 3) Goals scored
