= 1952–53 Chelsea F.C. season =

English football club season

Chelsea
1952–53 season
- Chairman: Joe Mears
- Manager: Ted Drake
- Stadium: Stamford Bridge
- First Division: 19th
- FA Cup: Fifth round
- Top goalscorer: League: Roy Bentley (12); All: Roy Bentley (17)
- Highest home attendance: 72,614 vs Arsenal (3 April 1953)
- Lowest home attendance: 17,173 vs Stoke City (27 December 1952)
- Average home league attendance: 43,842
- Biggest win: 4–0 (three matches)
- Biggest defeat: 0–4 (three matches)
Home colours	Away colours

The 1952–53 season was Chelsea Football Club's thirty-ninth competitive season.

== Table ==
Pos	Team	Pld	W	D	L	GF	GA	GAv	Pts	Relegation
17	Liverpool	42	14	8	20	61	82	0.744	36	
18	Sheffield Wednesday	42	12	11	19	62	72	0.861	35	
19	Chelsea	42	12	11	19	56	66	0.848	35	
20	Manchester City	42	14	7	21	72	87	0.828	35	
21	Stoke City (R)	42	12	10	20	53	66	0.803	34	Relegation to the Second Division

Source: World Football
Rules for classification: 1) Points; 2) Goal average; 3) Goals scored
(R) Relegated
