= Eddie White (footballer) =

Scottish footballer

Personal information
- Full name: Edward Ritchie White
- Date of birth: 13 April 1935 (age 91)
- Place of birth: Musselburgh, Scotland
- Position: Forward

Senior career*
| Years | Team | Apps | (Gls) |
- Musselburgh Athletic
| 1957–1959 | Falkirk | 19 | (13) |
| 1959–1960 | Bradford City | 4 | (1) |
| 1960–1961 | Arbroath | 4 | (0) |
| 1961 | Alloa Athletic | 3 | (1) |
| Total | | 30 | (15) |
- * Club domestic league appearances and goals

Edward Ritchie White (born 13 April 1935) is a Scottish former professional footballer who played as a forward. White is the older brother of John White and Tom White both professional footballers.

== Career ==
Born in Musselburgh, White played for Musselburgh Athletic, Falkirk, Bradford City, Arbroath and Alloa Athletic.
