= 1957–58 Chelsea F.C. season =

English football club season

Chelsea
1957–58 season
- Chairman: Joe Mears
- Manager: Ted Drake
- Stadium: Stamford Bridge
- First Division: 11th
- FA Cup: Fourth round
- Top goalscorer: League: Jimmy Greaves (22); All: Jimmy Greaves (22)
- Highest home attendance: 66,007 vs Arsenal (26 October 1957)
- Lowest home attendance: 17,038 vs Leeds United (7 December 1957)
- Average home league attendance: 38,430
- Biggest win: 6–1 v Burnley (21 September 1957)
- Biggest defeat: 1–4 (two matches)
Home colours	Away colours

The 1957–58 season was Chelsea Football Club's forty-fourth competitive season. The season saw the debut of teenage prodigy Jimmy Greaves, who would go on to score 132 goals in 157 matches for Chelsea and become the youngest-ever player to score 100 goals in the English top-flight.

== Table ==
Pos	Team	Pld	W	D	L	GF	GA	GAv	Pts	Qualification or relegation
9	Manchester United	42	16	11	15	85	75	1.133	43	
10	Nottingham Forest	42	16	10	16	69	63	1.095	42	
11	Chelsea	42	15	12	15	83	79	1.051	42	Qualification for the Inter-Cities Fairs Cup first round
12	Arsenal	42	16	7	19	73	85	0.859	39	
13	Birmingham City	42	14	11	17	76	89	0.854	39	Qualification for the Inter-Cities Fairs Cup first round

Source: World Football
Rules for classification: 1) Points; 2) Goal average; 3) Goals scored
