= 1956–57 Chelsea F.C. season =

English football club season

Chelsea
1956–57 season
- Chairman: Joe Mears
- Manager: Ted Drake
- Stadium: Stamford Bridge
- First Division: 13th
- FA Cup: Fourth round
- Top goalscorer: League: John McNichol and Ron Tindall (10); All: John McNichol (11)
- Highest home attendance: 55,788 vs Tottenham Hotspur (6 October 1956)
- Lowest home attendance: 13,647 vs Bolton Wanderers (23 February 1957)
- Average home league attendance: 31,637
- Biggest win: 6–2 v Newcastle United (22 April 1957)
- Biggest defeat: 0–4 (two matches)
Home colours	Away colours

The 1956–57 season was Chelsea Football Club's forty-third competitive season.

== Table ==
Pos	Team	Pld	W	D	L	GF	GA	GAv	Pts
11	West Bromwich Albion	42	14	14	14	59	61	0.967	42
12	Birmingham City	42	15	9	18	69	69	1.000	39
13	Chelsea	42	13	13	16	73	73	1.000	39
14	Sheffield Wednesday	42	16	6	20	82	88	0.932	38
15	Everton	42	14	10	18	61	79	0.772	38

Source: World Football
Rules for classification: 1) Points; 2) Goal average; 3) Goals scored
