= 1963–64 British Home Championship =

Tournament details
- Host country: England, Ireland, Scotland and Wales
- Dates: 12 October 1963 – 15 April 1964
- Teams: 4

Final positions
- Champions: England; Ireland; Scotland

Tournament statistics
- Matches played: 6
- Goals scored: 27 (4.5 per match)
- Top scorer: (England) Jimmy Greaves (5)

The 1963–64 British Home Championship international Home Nations football tournament was an unusual affair in which victory was shared between the England, Scotland and Ireland national football teams after all teams scored four points by beating Wales and then winning one and losing one of their remaining matches. Goal difference was not at this stage used to determine team positions in the tournament, but if it had been, England would have won with a goal difference of +8 with Scotland second and Ireland third.

England began the tournament the stronger side, defeating Wales 4–0 in Cardiff. Ireland too began well, beating the fancied Scots in a close game in Belfast. In the second round England took the lead with a thumping 8–3 victory over Ireland at home, in which Jimmy Greaves and Terry Paine both scored hat-tricks. The Scots gained some ground on the leaders by beating Wales in a close game in Glasgow in which John White scored. He was killed just two months after the tournament concluded. In the final matches, played at the close of the domestic season, England needed only a draw against Scotland to claim the trophy, whilst Ireland had to beat Wales to have any hope of reaching parity. Ireland were successful in another close game at Swansea, but Scotland edged England 1–0 to claim their own third share of the Championship.

== Table ==
| Team | Pld | W | D | L | GF | GA | GD | Pts |
|---|---|---|---|---|---|---|---|---|
| England (C) | 3 | 2 | 0 | 1 | 12 | 4 | +8 | 4 |
| Scotland (C) | 3 | 2 | 0 | 1 | 4 | 3 | +1 | 4 |
| Ireland (C) | 3 | 2 | 0 | 1 | 8 | 11 | −3 | 4 |
| Wales | 3 | 0 | 0 | 3 | 3 | 9 | −6 | 0 |

Rules for classification: 1) points. The points system worked as follows: 2 points for a win and 1 point for a draw.
(C) Co-champions

== Results ==
12 October 1963

| Ireland | 2–1 | Scotland |
|---|---|---|
| Bingham 26'; Wilson 63' | | St John 50' |

Windsor Park, Belfast
Attendance: 39,000
Referee: Jack Taylor (England)

12 October 1963

| Wales | 0–4 | England |
|---|---|---|
| | | Smith 5', 68'; Greaves 67'; Charlton 86' |

Ninian Park, Cardiff
Attendance: 48,350
Referee: William Brittle (Scotland)

20 November 1963

| Scotland | 2–1 | Wales |
|---|---|---|
| White 44'; Law 48' | | Jones 60' |

Hampden Park, Glasgow
Attendance: 56,067
Referee: William Clements (England)

20 November 1963

| England | 8–3 | Ireland |
|---|---|---|
| Paine 2', 37', 61'; Greaves 20', 30', 60', 65'; Smith 46' | | Crossan 42'; Wilson 74', 85' |

Wembley Stadium, London
Attendance: 55,000
Referee: Leo Callaghan (Wales)

11 April 1964

| Scotland | 1–0 | England |
|---|---|---|
| Gilzean 78' |

Hampden Park, Glasgow
Attendance: 133,245
Referee: Leo Horn (Netherlands)

15 April 1964

| Wales | 2–3 | Ireland |
|---|---|---|
| Godfrey 24'; Davies 63' | | McLaughlin 8'; Wilson 37'; Harvey 45' |

Vetch Field, Swansea
Attendance: 10,434
Referee: Ken Dagnall (England)
