= John White (footballer, born 1937) =

Scottish footballer (1937–1964)

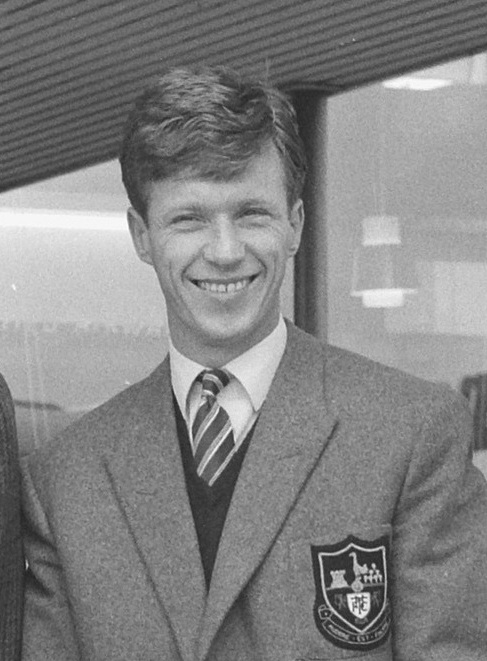

Personal information
- Full name: John Anderson White
- Date of birth: 28 April 1937
- Place of birth: Musselburgh, Midlothian, Scotland
- Date of death: 21 July 1964 (aged 27)
- Place of death: Crews Hill, Middlesex, England
- Position: Inside forward

Senior career*
Years	Team	Apps	(Gls)
1955–1958	Alloa Athletic	68	(26)
1958–1959	Falkirk	30	(8)
1959–1964	Tottenham Hotspur	183	(40)

International career
1959	SFL trial v SFA	1	(3)
1959–1964	Scotland	22	(3)
1959	Scottish League XI	2	(2)
1959	Scotland U23	1	(0)
1962–1964	SFA trial v SFL	2	(0)
- * Club domestic league appearances and goals

John Anderson White (28 April 1937 – 21 July 1964) was a Scottish international football midfielder and sometime inside right who played a significant role for Tottenham Hotspur (Spurs) during their Double winning season in 1960–61. He had two brothers, Eddie and Tom, who were also professional footballers. White was killed by a lightning strike at the age of 27.

== Playing career ==
=== Alloa Athletic ===
White first played at senior level for Alloa Athletic under the management of Jasper 'Jerry' Kerr. He debuted in the 1956–57 season. Kerr paired White in an effective inside forward combination with Dennis Gillespie. In the 68 league appearances White made for The Wasps, he scored 26 goals.

The John White Lounge is still a feature at the Clackmannanshire club's ground.

=== Falkirk ===
White was bought by Falkirk in August 1958 for £3,300 (£67,000 today). Alex Parker and Eddie O'Hara had been jointly sold to Everton the June before giving Falkirk a cash injection of £18,000. Among others at Falkirk, White played alongside Doug Moran. In White's 30 Falkirk league appearances he scored 11 goals. His stay there was relatively short, moving to England early in his second season.

White made his Scotland debut when he was at Falkirk. He scored in the first minute of his international debut, a 3–2 win against West Germany on 6 May 1959 at Hampden Park. He gained four full caps when at Falkirk playing in the first and last of those four games alongside Dave Mackay. The fourth game was against a Northern Ireland team in Belfast featuring Danny Blanchflower on 3 October 1959. White scored his second international goal in a 4–0 win for the Scots.

=== Tottenham Hotspur ===
White's frail appearance had been the cause of considerable concern amongst scouts, resulting in a number of English First Division clubs choosing not to risk his signing. However, following positive reviews from Mackay and Blanchflower, Bill Nicholson signed White for Tottenham Hotspur in the same October as White's international goal against Northern Ireland. Nicholson had also sought reference from the Army and been advised White was a celebrated cross-country runner. White cost £22,000 (£445,000 today).

At Spurs, White initially occupied the inside-left position, having been bought by Nicholson to replace Dave Dunmore, but his talent flourished as an inside right as a replacement to Tommy Harmer. He scored on his debut in October 1959, in a 2–1 defeat to Sheffield Wednesday at Hillsborough. White's worth to the team could be calculated in terms of goals scored (between 1959 and the conclusion of the Double winning season (a season in which he was ever-present) he contributed 18 goals) but his success mainly lay in a combination of skills: his passing, his ball control which helped sustain the attacking momentum but so too his runs to find space off the ball, arriving unexpectedly in the opposition's penalty area which resulted in the White Hart Lane faithful giving him the nickname "The Ghost".

Spurs lost against Benfica in the 1961–62 European Cup semi-final, however in the following season White was part of the successful campaign that saw Tottenham become the first English winners of a European trophy when they won the 1963 European Cup Winners' Cup Final. They beat Atlético Madrid 5–1 in Rotterdam with White scoring Spurs' second. They had beaten White's Scottish former opponents, Rangers, home and away in the first round.

Cliff Jones, his Tottenham teammate, said of him: "He was a great talent. People ask me what he was like. I say that he was like Glenn Hoddle. But he was different to Glenn in some ways. Glenn was someone who you had to bring into a game, whereas John White would bring himself into a game. If you're not in possession, get in position, that was John White. He was always available if you needed to pass to someone".

== Death and testimonial ==
White was killed by a lightning strike at the age of 27 while sheltering under a tree during a thunderstorm at Crews Hill golf course, Enfield on 21 July 1964. He left a 22-year-old widow, Sandra, daughter of Spurs' assistant manager Harry Evans, whom he married in 1961, and two children.

White's testimonial was staged later in the year he died, on 10 November 1964, at White Hart Lane, when a Tottenham XI faced a Scotland XI. White's younger brother Tom, played for Tottenham in this match, scoring the first goal of the game from a pass from Jimmy Greaves. White's portrait has been erected in the entrance to the Scottish Football Hall of Fame.

His son Rob has no memory of his father, as he was only six months old when he died, and his older sister Mandy was only two at the time.

== Career statistics ==
=== International appearances ===
Appearances and goals by national team and year
National team	Year	Apps	Goals
Scotland	1959	5	2
Scotland	1960	4	0
Scotland	1961	4	0
Scotland	1962	3	0
Scotland	1963	4	1
Scotland	1964	2	0
Total		22	3

=== International goals ===
Scores and results list Scotland's goal tally first.

#	Date	Venue	Opponent	Score	Result	Competition	Ref
1.	6 May 1959	Hampden Park, Glasgow	West Germany	1–0	3–2	Friendly match	
2.	3 October 1959	Windsor Park, Belfast	Northern Ireland	3–0	4–0	1959–60 British Home Championship	
3.	20 November 1963	Hampden Park, Glasgow	Wales	1–0	2–1	1963–64 British Home Championship	

== Honours ==
Tottenham Hotspur

- Football League First Division: 1960-61
- European Cup Winners Cup: 1962-63
- FA Cup: 1960–61, 1961–62
