= Ron Tindall =

English cricketer and footballer

Personal information
- Full name: Ronald Albert Ernest Tindall
- Date of birth: 23 September 1935
- Place of birth: Streatham, London, England
- Date of death: 9 September 2012 (aged 76)
- Place of death: Perth, Australia
- Position: Striker

Senior career*
| Years | Team | Apps | (Gls) |
| 1952 | Camberley | 2 | (1) |
| 1953–1961 | Chelsea | 160 | (67) |
| 1961 | West Ham United | 13 | (3) |
| 1962–1963 | Reading | 36 | (12) |
| 1964–1969 | Portsmouth | 162 | (7) |

Managerial career
- 1970–1973: Portsmouth
- 1974: Portsmouth (caretaker)
- 1977–1987: Western Australia (director of coaching)
- * Club domestic league appearances and goals

Ronald Albert Ernest Tindall OAM (23 September 1935 – 9 September 2012) was an English footballer who played as a striker. He was also an accomplished cricketer, playing for Surrey.

== Football career ==
Tindall played youth football for Camberley Wanderers when the club formed in 1950. He began his senior career when he joined Camberley F.C. in 1952 at the age of 16. He only made two appearances for the first team before joining Chelsea's new youth system in 1953. Two years later, he scored on his full debut for the club against West Bromwich Albion in the First Division. Within a year, Tindall had established himself in the Chelsea first team and, though the side's form was often erratic, he struck up a prolific strike partnership with the emerging Jimmy Greaves. In the 1960–61 season, they scored 59 goals between them (16 for Tindall, 43 for Greaves), a club record which still stands.

By the end of 1961, both Greaves and manager Ted Drake had left Chelsea and Tommy Docherty was appointed in Drake's place; Tindall became surplus to requirements as Docherty concentrated on re-building the Chelsea side around the new generation of youngsters. He was sold to West Ham United in November 1961 in part exchange for Andy Malcolm. He ended his Chelsea career with 69 goals from 174 games, making him 17th in Chelsea's all-time goalscorers list.

Tindall's time at West Ham was brief, and he soon moved on to play for Reading, where he scored 12 goals in 36 league games before moving to Portsmouth in 1964. Tindall played out the remainder of his career at Portsmouth, making 162 league appearances before retiring in 1969. He was appointed manager of Portsmouth in 1970, but was hampered by the club's financial problems and had left the job by 1973. He was caretaker manager of Portsmouth for two games in 1974 following John Mortimore's departure.

== Cricket career ==
Upon signing for Chelsea, Tindall negotiated a special arrangement with the club, whereby he was allowed to miss the first and last months of the football season to play cricket for Surrey. Tindall was an all-rounder, a right-handed middle order batsman and a right-arm off-break bowler. His first-class career with Surrey lasted from 1956 to 1966, though he only played in three matches prior to 1960. He was awarded his county cap in 1962.

He scored 5446 runs in first-class matches at an average of 24.86, including two centuries and with a highest score of 109 not out. He reached one thousand runs in a season for the only time in 1963. He took 150 wickets at 32.38, with best figures in an innings of 5–41. Easily his most successful season with the ball was 1962, when he got his chance after the retirements of the Surrey off-spinners Jim Laker and Eric Bedser and took 66 wickets at 23.92. He played in ten List A matches between 1963 and 1966, all in the Gillette Cup. In those matches he scored 218 runs at 24.22, with a top score of 73. He bowled a total of only 22 overs in the ten matches, taking only two wickets and conceding 118 runs.

== Later life and death ==
He immigrated to Western Australia in 1977 to take the job of director of the state's football coaching. He lived there for the remainder of his life. In 2008, he was awarded the Order of Australia Medal (OAM) for services to sport. He died in September 2012, just before his 77th birthday.
