= 1979–80 Athenian League =

Athenian League
- Season: 1979–80
- Champions: Windsor & Eton
- Promoted: Dorking Town
- Relegated: None

The 1979–80 Athenian League season was the 57th in the history of Athenian League. The league consisted of 20 teams.

== Clubs ==
The league joined 2 new teams:

- Banstead Athletic, from London Spartan League Premier Division
- Woodford Town, from Essex Senior League

== League table ==
Pos	Team	Pld	W	D	L	GF	GA	GR	Pts	Promotion or relegation
1	Windsor & Eton (C)	38	26	6	6	72	26	2.769	58	
2	Burnham	38	24	8	6	73	28	2.607	56	
3	Leyton-Wingate	38	22	8	8	86	48	1.792	52	
4	Dorking Town (P)	38	20	8	10	61	41	1.488	48	Promotion to Isthmian League Division Two
5	Welling United	38	20	7	11	86	46	1.870	47	
6	Uxbridge	38	20	7	11	49	41	1.195	47	
7	Grays Athletic	38	20	2	16	69	48	1.438	42	
8	Ruislip Manor	38	16	10	12	55	46	1.196	42	
9	Marlow	38	16	10	12	66	58	1.138	42	
10	Edgware	38	15	11	12	62	63	0.984	41	
11	Redhill	38	15	9	14	55	46	1.196	39	
12	Banstead Athletic	38	15	9	14	57	54	1.056	39	
13	Woodford Town	38	13	9	16	57	60	0.950	35	
14	Hoddesdon Town	38	12	7	19	56	55	1.018	31	
15	Chalfont St.Peter	38	10	10	18	50	67	0.746	30	
16	Harefield United	38	10	8	20	41	60	0.683	28	
17	Fleet Town	38	10	6	22	43	80	0.538	26	
18	Haringey Borough	38	9	7	22	41	83	0.494	25	
19	Alton Town	38	8	5	25	43	101	0.426	21	
20	Chertsey Town	38	4	3	31	33	104	0.317	11	

Source: fchd.info
Rules for classification: 1) points; 2) goal difference; 3) number of goals scored.
(C) Champions; (P) Promoted

=== Stadia and locations ===
Locations of the Athenian League clubs
Greater London Athenian League football clubs

Club	Stadium
Alton Town	Anstey Park
Banstead Athletic	Merland Rise
Burnham	The 1878 Stadium
Chalfont St Peter	Mill Meadow
Chertsey Town	Alwyns Lane
Dorking Town	Meadowbank Stadium
Edgware	White Lion
Fleet Town	Calthorpe Park
Grays Athletic	New Recreation Ground
Harefield United	Preston Park
Haringey Borough	Coles Park
Hoddesdon Town	Lowfield
Leyton-Wingate	Wadham Lodge
Redhill	Kiln Brow
Ruislip Manor	Grosvenor Vale
Marlow	Alfred Davis Memorial Ground
Uxbridge	Honeycroft
Welling United	Park View Road
Windsor & Eton	Stag Meadow
Woodford Town	Snakes Lane
