= Sylvan Anderton =

English footballer (born 1934)

Personal information
- Full name: Sylvan James Anderton
- Date of birth: 23 November 1934 (age 91)
- Place of birth: Reading, Berkshire, England
- Height: 5 ft 9 in (1.75 m)
- Position: Wing half

Youth career
- Reading

Senior career*
Years	Team	Apps	(Gls)
1952–1959	Reading	155	(18)
1958–1961	Chelsea	76	(2)
1961–1962	Queens Park Rangers	4	(0)
- Dover
Total		235	(20)
- * Club domestic league appearances and goals

Sylvan James Anderton (born 23 November 1934) is an English former footballer who played in the Football League for Chelsea, Queens Park Rangers and Reading.

== Early life ==
Anderton was born in Reading on 23 November 1934. He started playing football with Battle Athletic, a local amateur club which was later "adopted" by Reading. In 1952, he signed as a centre forward for Reading, after scoring 43 goals in 27 matches for the club's junior team.

== Career ==
Anderton made his debut for the Reading senior team on 20 December 1952, the fifth local player to appear that season. He is a member of the Supporters' Trust at Reading Hall of Fame. He played for Chelsea from 1959 to 1963. He also played for Queens Park Rangers and Dover.

== Later life ==
Anderton later lived in Bideford in Devon. He and his brother were plane spotters who assisted with the investigation into the disappearance of Glenn Miller.
