= Billy Birrell =

Scottish footballer and manager

Personal information
- Full name: William Birrell
- Date of birth: 13 March 1897
- Place of birth: Cellardyke, Scotland
- Date of death: 29 November 1968 (aged 71)
- Height: 5 ft 9 in (1.75 m)
- Position: Forward

Senior career*
Years	Team	Apps	(Gls)
1914–1915	Inverkeithing United		
1915–1921	Raith Rovers	77	(19)
–1920	→ Kirkcaldy United (guest)		
1921–1927	Middlesbrough	225	(59)
1927–1930	Raith Rovers	51	(22)

Managerial career
- 1927–1930: Raith Rovers (player-manager)
- 1930–1935: Bournemouth & Boscombe Athletic
- 1935–1939: Queens Park Rangers
- 1939–1952: Chelsea
- * Club domestic league appearances and goals

William Birrell (13 March 1897 – 29 November 1968) was a Scottish professional footballer who played as a forward.

== Career ==
Birrell made over 220 appearances as a forward in the Football League for Middlesbrough. He also made over 120 appearances in the Scottish League for Raith Rovers. He began his career in management while a player at Raith Rovers and after his retirement, he managed Football League clubs Bournemouth & Boscombe Athletic and Queens Park Rangers.

On 19 April 1939, he was appointed the new Chelsea manager. The Second World War forced the Football League to be abandoned less than half a year following Birrell's appointment. During wartime, he led Chelsea to two consecutive Football League War Cup South Final at Wembley, winning the cup in 1945.

In wartime, Birrell developed the idea of a youth team for Chelsea, and on 25 May 1940, the Chelsea Junior team, a team which included future England manager Ron Greenwood, played their first match against Queens Park Rangers. Birrell's plan was fully implemented after the war, with the sponsorship of The Tudor Rose Boys' Club, allowing them to run four teams in the Harrow and Wembley League.

== Personal life ==
Birrell's brother Bob was also a footballer.

== Career statistics ==
=== Player ===
Appearances and goals by club, season and competition
Club	Season	League			National Cup		Total	
Club	Season	Division	Apps	Goals	Apps	Goals	Apps	Goals
Raith Rovers	1915–16	Scottish Division One	13	5	—		13	5
Raith Rovers	1916–17	Scottish Division One	1	0	—		1	0
Raith Rovers	1919–20	Scottish Division One	35	7	6	2	41	9
Raith Rovers	1920–21	Scottish Division One	28	7	1	0	29	7
Raith Rovers	Total		77	19	7	2	84	21
Middlesbrough	1920–21	First Division	14	2	—		14	2
Middlesbrough	1921–22	First Division	35	9	1	0	36	9
Middlesbrough	1922–23	First Division	38	9	3	1	41	10
Middlesbrough	1923–24	First Division	21	2	0	0	21	2
Middlesbrough	1924–25	Second Division	27	3	1	0	28	3
Middlesbrough	1925–26	Second Division	42	18	2	1	44	19
Middlesbrough	1926–27	Second Division	41	16	3	2	44	18
Middlesbrough	1927–28	First Division	7	1	0	0	7	1
Middlesbrough	Total		225	59	10	4	235	63
Raith Rovers	1926–27	Scottish Division One	15	4	3	1	18	5
Raith Rovers	1929–30	Scottish Division Two	20	12	2	1	22	13
Raith Rovers	1930–31	Scottish Division Two	16	6	0	0	16	6
Raith Rovers	Total		128	41	12	14	140	55
Career total			353	100	22	18	375	118

=== Manager ===
Team	From	To	Record					Ref
Team	From	To	G	W	D	L	Win %	Ref
Raith Rovers (player-manager)	1927	1930	123	45	24	54	36.59	
Bournemouth & Boscombe Athletic	August 1930	May 1935	220	67	56	97	30.45	
Queens Park Rangers	May 1935	April 1939	184	85	42	57	46.20	
Chelsea	April 1939	April 1952	285	96	74	115	33.68	
Total			812	293	196	323	36.08	—

== Honours ==
=== As a player ===
Middlesbrough

- Football League Second Division: 1926–27

=== As a manager ===
Chelsea

- Football League South War Cup: 1943–44, 1944–45
