= Joe Mears =

English football chairman (1905–1966)

Personal information
- Full name: Joseph Henry Watt Mears
- Date of birth: 20 January 1905
- Place of birth: London, England
- Date of death: 30 June 1966 (aged 61)
- Place of death: Oslo, Norway
- Position: Goalkeeper

Senior career*
Years	Team	Apps	(Gls)
–1931	Old Malvernians		

Managerial career
- 1955–58: London XI
- * Club domestic league appearances and goals

Joseph Henry Watt Mears (20 January 1905 – 30 June 1966) was chairman of Chelsea Football Club and the Football Association.

Mears was the son and nephew of Chelsea F.C. founders, Joseph and Gus Mears respectively. He was a goalkeeper for the Old Malvernians before joining the Chelsea board in 1931, in doing so becoming the youngest director (aged 26) in the Football League. He became Chelsea chairman in 1940 following the death of Colonel Crisp. Mears was a Royal Marine during the Second World War, and his duties included the security arrangements for Prime Minister Winston Churchill's bunker.

Mears' tenure as chairman of Chelsea saw them win their first First Division title in 1954–55, and it was he who subsequently gave in to pressure from the Football League for the club not to take its place in the inaugural European Champions Cup the following season. He later managed the representative London XI side during its 1955–58 Inter-Cities Fairs Cup campaign; the team reached the final, losing on aggregate to FC Barcelona. His son Brian was also a chairman of the club.

Mears became chairman of the Football Association in 1963. As such, he was a key figure during England's preparations to host the 1966 World Cup, and was involved in the furore when the Jules Rimet trophy was stolen. It was he who received the ransom note from the thief, and was subsequently involved in the trophy's recovery.

He died of a heart attack in Oslo on 30 June 1966, two weeks before the World Cup began.
