= 1954–55 Chelsea F.C. season =

English football club season

Chelsea
1954–55 season
- Chairman: Joe Mears
- Manager: Ted Drake
- First Division: 1st
- FA Cup: Fifth round
- Top goalscorer: League: Roy Bentley (21); All: Roy Bentley (21)
- Highest home attendance: 75,043 vs Wolverhampton Wanderers (9 April 1955)
- Lowest home attendance: 30,239 vs Burnley (23 August 1954)
Home colours	Away colours

The 1954–55 season was Chelsea Football Club's 50th of competitive football, their Golden Jubilee and their 20th consecutive year in the English top flight. It was also the club's most successful year up to that point, as they won the Football League Championship for the first time.

The success was unexpected; Chelsea had never won a major trophy before and their league positions since the Second World War had ranged from 8th to 20th. They also began this season inauspiciously, and the club were languishing in 12th place after four consecutive defeats in October. Subsequently, results improved and the team lost just three of their next 25 matches, ultimately securing the title with a game to spare. Key to the success were two wins against their principal title rivals Wolverhampton Wanderers and a ten match unbeaten streak during the title run-in. Club captain Roy Bentley finished as top scorer, with 21 goals, and the club attracted an average home gate of 48,307, the highest in the division.

As champions of England, Chelsea were invited to enter the inaugural European Cup. They initially accepted, but later withdrew from the competition under pressure from the Football League, who saw the tournament as a distraction to domestic football.

== Results ==
=== First Division ===
Date	Opponent	Venue	Result	Attendance	Scorers
21 August 1954	Leicester City	A	1–1	38,941	Bentley
23 August 1954	Burnley	H	1–0	30,239	Parsons
28 August 1954	Bolton Wanderers	H	3–2	52,756	Bentley, Lewis, Ball (o.g.)
31 August 1954	Burnley	A	1–1	52,756	Bentley
4 September 1954	Cardiff City	H	1–1	42,688	Lewis
6 September 1954	Preston North End	H	0–1	36,947	
11 September 1954	Manchester City	A	1–1	36,230	Bentley
15 September 1954	Preston North End	A	2–1	27,549	Parsons, McNichol
18 September 1954	Everton	H	0–2	59,199	
20 November 1954	Sheffield United	A	2–1	14,137	Stubbs, Lewis
25 September 1954	Newcastle United	A	3–1	45,659	McNichol, Bentley (2)
2 October 1954	West Bromwich Albion	H	3–3	67,440	Parsons, Bentley, Lewis
9 October 1954	Huddersfield Town	A	0–1	29,556	
16 October 1954	Manchester United	H	5–6	55,966	Armstrong, O'Connell (3), Lewis
23 October 1954	Blackpool	A	0–1	19,694	
30 October 1954	Charlton Athletic	H	1–2	54,113	Parsons
6 November 1954	Sunderland	A	3–3	42,416	McNichol (2), Stubbs
13 November 1954	Tottenham Hotspur	H	2–1	52,961	Bentley, Lewis
20 November 1954	Sheffield Wednesday	A	1–1	25,913	McNichol
27 November 1954	Portsmouth	H	4–1	40,358	McNichol, Stubbs, Bentley, Blunstone
4 December 1954	Wolverhampton Wanderers	A	4–3	32,095	McNichol, Bentley (2), Stubbs
11 December 1954	Aston Villa	H	4–0	36,162	Parsons, McNichol (2), Bentley
18 December 1954	Leicester City	H	3–1	33,215	Parsons, McNichol, Froggatt/Milburn (o.g.)
25 December 1954	Arsenal	A	0–1	47,178	
27 December 1954	Arsenal	H	1–1	65,922	O'Connell
1 January 1955	Bolton Wanderers	A	5–2	30,988	Sillett, O'Connell, Bentley (2), Higgins (o.g.)
22 January 1955	Manchester City	H	0–2	34,160	
5 February 1955	Everton	A	1–1	50,658	Bentley
12 February 1955	Newcastle United	H	4–3	50,667	McNichol, Bentley (3)
26 February 1955	Huddersfield Town	H	4–1	35,786	Parsons, Bentley, Stubbs, Blunstone
5 March 1955	Aston Villa	A	2–3	24,822	Parsons, McNichol
9 March 1955	West Bromwich Albion	A	4–2	7,764	Sillett (2), Saunders, Bentley
12 March 1955	Blackpool	H	0–0	55,227	
19 March 1955	Charlton Athletic	A	2–0	41,415	O'Connell, Blunstone
23 March 1955	Cardiff City	A	1–0	16,649	O'Connell
29 March 1955	Sunderland	H	2–1	33,203	Willemse, McDonald (o.g.)
2 April 1955	Tottenham Hotspur	A	4–2	53,159	Sillett (pen.), Wicks, McNichol (2)
8 April 1955	Sheffield United	H	1–1	50,978	Parsons
9 April 1955	Wolverhampton Wanderers	H	1–0	75,043	Sillett (pen.)
16 April 1955	Portsmouth	A	0–0	40,230	
23 April 1955	Sheffield Wednesday	H	3–0	51,421	Sillett (pen.), Parsons (2)
30 April 1955	Manchester United	A	1–2	34,933	Bentley

Pos	Team	Pld	W	D	L	GF	GA	GAv	Pts	Qualification or relegation
1	Chelsea (C)	42	20	12	10	81	57	1.421	52	Denied entry to the European Cup (Note: Chelsea were invited to play at the inaugural European Cup but were barred from participation by The FA.)
2	Wolverhampton Wanderers	42	19	10	13	89	70	1.271	48	
3	Portsmouth	42	18	12	12	74	62	1.194	48	
4	Sunderland	42	15	18	9	64	54	1.185	48	
5	Manchester United	42	20	7	15	84	74	1.135	47	

Source: World Football
Rules for classification: 1) Points; 2) Goal average; 3) Goals scored
(C) Champions

=== FA Cup ===
Date	Round	Opponent	Venue	Result	Attendance	Scorers
8 January 1955	R3	Walsall	Stamford Bridge	2–0	40,020	O'Connell, Stubbs
29 January 1955	R4	Bristol Rovers	Eastville Stadium	3–1	35,952	Parsons, McNichol, Blunstone
19 February 1955	R5	Notts County	Meadow Lane	0–1	41,930	

== Players Used ==
Player	Position	League	Goals	Cup	Goals	Games	Goals
(Scotland) Charlie Thomson	Goalkeeper	16	0				
(Scotland) Bill Robertson	Goalkeeper	26	0				
(England) Ken Armstrong	Right-half	39	1				
(England) Stan Wicks	Centre-half	21	1				
(England) Alan Dicks	Centre-half	1	0				
(England) Ron Greenwood	Centre-half	21	0				
(Scotland) John Harris	Centre-half/right-back	31	0				
(England) Derek Saunders	Left-half	42	1				
(England) Peter Sillett	Right-back	21	6				
(England) Stan Willemse	Left-back	36	1				
(England) Eric Parsons	Right-wing	42	11				
(England) Frank Blunstone	Left-wing	23	3				
(England) Jim Lewis	Left-wing	17	6				
(Scotland) John McNichol	Inside-right	40	14				
(England) Roy Bentley (c)	Centre forward	41	21				
(England) Les Stubbs	Inside-left	27	5				
(England) Robert Edwards	Outside-left	1	0				
(England) Peter Brabrook	Forward	3	0				
(England) Bobby Smith	Centre forward	4	0				
(England) Seamus O'Connell	Inside-left	10	7				
