= History of Chelsea F.C. (1952–1983) =

History of an English football club

This article documents the history of Chelsea Football Club, an English association football team based in Fulham, West London. For a general overview of the club, see Chelsea F.C.

Former Arsenal and England centre-forward Ted Drake was appointed manager in 1952 and modernised the club. He removed the club's Chelsea pensioner crest, improved the youth set-up and training regime, rebuilt the side with signings from the lower divisions and amateur leagues, and led Chelsea to their first major trophy success – the League championship – in 1954–55. The following season saw UEFA create the European Champions' Cup, but after objections from The Football League, Chelsea were persuaded to withdraw from the competition before it started. Chelsea did not build on this success, and spent the remainder of the 1950s in mid-table. Drake was dismissed in 1961 and replaced by player-coach Tommy Docherty.

Docherty built a new team around young players emerging from the club's youth set-up, and Chelsea challenged for honours throughout the 1960s. They were on course for a treble of League, FA Cup and League Cup going into the final stages of the 1964–65 season, winning the League Cup but not the other two competitions. In three seasons the side were beaten in three major semi-finals and were FA Cup runners-up. Under Docherty's successor, Dave Sexton, Chelsea won the FA Cup in 1970, beating Leeds United 2–1 in a final replay. The following year, Chelsea won their first European honour, a UEFA Cup Winners' Cup triumph, with another replayed win, this time over Real Madrid in Athens.

== Ted Drake: modernisation and the Championship (1952–1961) ==
In 1952, former Arsenal and England striker Ted Drake was appointed manager. One of the first "tracksuit managers" who used to shake each player by the hand and wish them "all the best" before each match, Drake modernised the club, both on and off the field. One of his first actions was to remove the image of a Chelsea pensioner from the match programme and discontinue the club's old nickname. From then on they were to be known as the Blues. This also led to the introduction of a new "lion rampant" crest.

He improved the training regime, introducing ballwork to training sessions, a practice rare in England at the time; the youth and scouting systems begun by his predecessor were extended and he changed the club's previous recruiting policy, signing lesser known players from the lower divisions. He also urged the club's fans to support the team more vocally. In Drake's first two seasons, Chelsea finished 19th, one point above relegation, and then 8th.

In 1954–55, the club's jubilee year, the team won the First Division title. It included goalkeeper Charlie 'Chic' Thomson, amateur players Derek Saunders and Jim Lewis, central midfielder Johnny "Jock" McNichol, wingers Eric "Rabbit" Parsons and Frank Blunstone, defender Peter Sillett and future England manager Ron Greenwood in central defence, as well club stalwarts, right back Ken Armstrong, left-back Stan Willemse and veteran defender John Harris. The most prominent player in the side was captain, top-scorer (with 21 league goals) and England international Roy Bentley.

Chelsea began the season with four consecutive defeats, including a 5–6 loss to Manchester United, which left them 12th in November. The team then lost just 3 of the next 25 games and secured the title with a game to spare after a 3–0 win against Sheffield Wednesday on St George's Day. Key to the title were two league wins against principal rivals and eventual runners-up Wolverhampton Wanderers. The first was a 4–3 win at Molineux – a game in which Chelsea were trailing 2–3 going into stoppage time – and a 1–0 win at Stamford Bridge in April, secured with a Sillett penalty awarded after Wolves captain Billy Wright had punched a goal-bound shot over the bar.

Chelsea's points total of 52 for that season remains one of the lowest to have secured the English League title since the First World War. In the final game of the season, Chelsea, now champions, were given a guard of honour by Matt Busby's Manchester United Busby Babes. That same season saw the reserve, 'A' and junior sides also win their respective leagues.

Winning the Championship made Chelsea eligible to become the first English participants in the inaugural European Champions' Cup competition to be staged the following season. They were drawn to face Swedish champions Djurgårdens IF in the first round. Chelsea, however, did not take part after the intervention of the Football League and the FA, many of whose leading members were opposed to the idea and felt that primacy should be given to domestic competitions, so the club were persuaded to withdraw. Chelsea did play an unofficial UK championship friendly against Scottish champions Aberdeen, which Aberdeen won. Chelsea presented a plate with the club crest to Aberdeen as a reward.

Chelsea were unable to build on their title success, and finished 16th the following season. The team was aging and subsequently recorded several mid-table finishes; during this period, Jimmy Greaves emerged and scored 122 league goals in four seasons. Along with Greaves, a series of other young players, informally known as Drake's Ducklings, emerged in the first team, though their inexperience contributed to inconsistent performances. Chelsea were knocked out of the FA Cup in the 3rd round by Fourth Division side Crewe Alexandra in January 1961. After Greaves was sold to Milan, results declined without his goal contributions. Drake was sacked in September after a 4–0 loss to Blackpool with Chelsea bottom of the league table. He was replaced by 33-year-old player-coach Tommy Docherty.

== Emergence (1963–1971) ==
=== Tommy Docherty ===
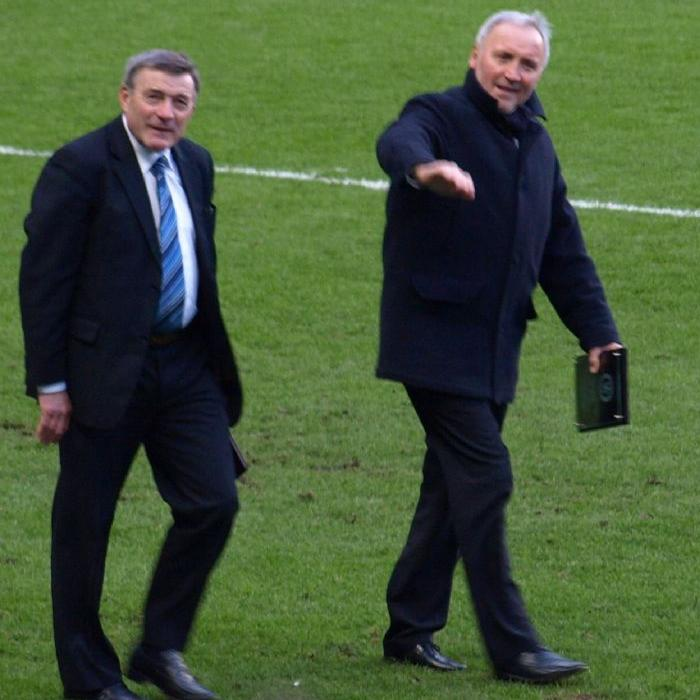
Bobby Tambling and Barry Bridges, two key players in the Chelsea side of the 1960s, pictured at Stamford Bridge in 2009

During the 1960s, Chelsea became associated with London's popular culture, with King's Road close to the club's Stamford Bridge ground. Public figures of the period, including Michael Caine, Steve McQueen, Raquel Welch, Terence Stamp and Richard Attenborough (former Life Vice President of the club), were regularly seen at Stamford Bridge. The team became more prominent during the decade, but did not win the league and had several near-misses in domestic competitions.

Docherty imposed a regime of discipline, sold off many of the club's older players, and replaced them with the new generation of young players emerging from the youth system, supplemented by transfers. By the time he took over in January 1962, the team were in a difficult position and he used the time to experiment and plan for the future. Chelsea were relegated and in Docherty's first full season as manager he led them back to promotion as Second Division runners-up, secured with a 1–0 win at rivals Sunderland (and a goal scored via Tommy Harmer's groin) and a 7–0 final day win over Portsmouth.

Chelsea returned to the First Division with a young team which included Ron "Chopper" Harris (who would set a club record of 795 senior appearances), goalkeeper Peter Bonetti, goalscoring winger Bobby Tambling (whose 202 goals remained a club record until 2013), midfielder John Hollins, full-back Ken Shellito, striker Barry Bridges, winger Bert Murray and captain and playmaker Terry Venables, all products of the youth system. To these, Docherty added striker George Graham, left-back Eddie McCreadie and defender Marvin Hinton for minimal fees to complete the Diamonds line-up – Docherty had referred to the team as his "little diamonds" during a TV documentary and the name stuck.

Chelsea finished fifth in their first season back in the top-flight, and in the next were on course for a domestic "treble" of league, FA Cup and League Cup, playing football based on high energy and quick passing and using tactics that included overlapping full-backs. Chelsea set the early pace and emerged in a three-way contest for the league title with Manchester United and Leeds United. The League Cup was secured through a 3–2 first leg win against Leicester City, with a solo goal from McCreadie proving to be the difference between the sides, and then a 0–0 draw in the second leg at Filbert Street.

Tensions also developed, however, as Docherty increasingly clashed with some of the personalities within the dressing room, particularly Venables. The team were beaten by title rivals Manchester United in March and lost 2–0 in their FA Cup semi-final against Liverpool, despite going into the latter match as favourites. They were nonetheless top with four games remaining. Docherty then sent home eight key players (Venables, Graham, Bridges, Hollins, McCreadie, Hinton, Murray and Joe Fascione) for breaking a curfew before a match against Burnley. The remaining team, made up of reserves and young players, were beaten 6–2 as the title challenge ended; Chelsea eventually finished third.

The following season Chelsea again challenged in the League, the FA Cup and the Fairs Cup. Playing a then-club record total of 60 games in the three competitions in the days before substitutes, the team were affected by the fixture pile-up. They finished fifth in the League, while in the FA Cup, Chelsea defeated holders Liverpool at Anfield en route to another semi-final, where they were drawn to face Sheffield Wednesday, again at Villa Park. Although considered favourites to reach the final, they were beaten 2–0 by the Yorkshire club.

Their Fairs Cup run, taking in wins over Roma (a violent encounter, during which the Chelsea team coach was ambushed by Roma fans), 1860 Munich and Milan (the last on the toss of a coin after the teams had finished level), ended in a semi-final loss to Barcelona. Both home sides won 2–0 and on another coin toss, the replay was staged at the Camp Nou, with Barça winning 5–0. Docherty, his relationship with several players having deteriorated, then made the decision to break up a team with an average age of 21. Venables, Graham, Bridges and Murray were all sold during the close-season. Scottish winger Charlie Cooke joined for £72,000, as did striker Tommy Baldwin, who arrived in part-exchange for Graham. Also emerging from the youth set-up was teenage striker Peter Osgood.

Docherty's transfer changes initially had an effect. Chelsea, with Osgood in the team, topped the league table in October 1966, the only unbeaten side after ten league games. But Osgood broke his leg in a League Cup tie and the side's momentum was disrupted. To replace Osgood, Docherty immediately signed striker Tony Hateley for a club record £100,000, but Hateley's aerial game did not suit Chelsea's style and he struggled to fit in. They moved down the league and finished ninth. The notable result of that season was reaching the FA Cup final. En route to that final was a win over Leeds United in the semi-finals, the game widely seen as the one which started the rivalry between the two clubs. Hateley headed in what proved to be the winner, while Leeds had two goals disallowed, one for offside and one for a Peter Lorimer free-kick taken too quickly.

Chelsea competed with Tottenham Hotspur in the first all-London FA Cup final, known as the Cockney Cup Final. It was Chelsea's first appearance in the final since 1915 and their first ever appearance in the final at Wembley. In leading out the side, Ron Harris, at 22, was the youngest ever captain to take to the field in the competition's finale. Chelsea lost 2–1 to a Spurs side containing both Venables and Jimmy Greaves, with a late Tambling header reducing the deficit. Docherty was sacked shortly into the next season with the team having won only two of their opening ten games, which included a 6–2 home loss to Southampton, amid reports of dressing room unrest over bonus payments and whilst serving a 28-day ban from football management handed out by the FA.

=== Dave Sexton ===
After Docherty's departure, his assistant Ron Suart was placed in temporary charge of the first team. Chelsea lost their next game 7–0 against Leeds United, equalling the club's highest-ever margin of defeat (in 1953–54, they had lost 8–1 to Wolves). Dave Sexton, ex-Chelsea coach and Leyton Orient manager, was appointed manager. The core of the side inherited from Docherty remained largely unchanged, although he added defenders John Dempsey and David Webb, signed striker Ian Hutchinson, gave midfielder Alan Hudson his debut and recalled winger Peter Houseman. Sexton led Chelsea to two more top-six finishes, as well as a return to the Fairs Cup in 1968–69, where they were knocked out by DWS on a coin toss.

1970 FA Cup Final starting lineup

In the 1969–70 season, Osgood and Hutchinson scored 53 goals between them, helping the club finish third in the league and reach another FA Cup final. This time the opponents were Leeds United, reigning league champions and one of the leading sides of the era. Chelsea trailed twice in the first match at Wembley, played on a boggy pitch, but came from behind to gain a 2–2 draw, first through Houseman and then a late headed equaliser (four minutes from full-time) from Hutchinson. The replay was staged at Old Trafford a fortnight later and is known for the physical play and skill shown by both sides. Chelsea again went behind but equalised for the third time in the match with a diving header from Osgood from a Cooke cross. As the game went into extra time, Chelsea took the lead for the first time when Webb headed in a Hutchinson throw-in to seal a 2–1 win.

Winning the Cup qualified Chelsea to play in the UEFA Cup Winners' Cup for the first time. Wins over Aris and CSKA Sofia took them to the quarter-finals, where they knocked out Club Brugge after overturning a 2–0 first-leg deficit. It took an Osgood goal nine minutes from the end of normal time to put Chelsea level on aggregate. They went on to win the game 4–0 after extra time. Fellow English side and holders Manchester City were beaten in the semi-final. The first final match against Real Madrid finished 1–1 but a goal from Dempsey and another strike from Osgood in the replay – played two days later – secured a 2–1 win and Chelsea's first European honour. The song "Blue is the Colour" was released in 1972 with members of the squad singing, and it reached number five in the UK Singles Chart. The song became associated with the Chelsea team of that era.

== Decline (1972–1983) ==
The Cup Winners' Cup triumph was Chelsea's last major success of the decade, followed by a series of problems on and off the pitch. From the early 1970s, Sexton fell out with several key players, most notably Osgood, Hudson and Baldwin, over their attitude and lifestyle. Results also declined during this period. Chelsea set two records in defence of the Cup Winners' Cup in 1971–72: a 21–0 aggregate win over Luxembourg side Jeunesse Hautcharage, which remains a record scoreline in European competition. The result included a 13–0 home win over Jeunesse, the biggest winning scoreline in Chelsea's history. However, the team were knocked out of the competition by Åtvidabergs FF under the away goals rule in the next round.

In the same season, Chelsea were knocked out of the FA Cup by Second Division Leyton Orient despite having led 2–0, and lost in the League Cup final to Stoke City. The 1972–73 season began with a 4–0 win over Leeds and the club were fourth in the table in December, but after a 3–0 aggregate loss to Norwich City in the League Cup semi-finals Chelsea won just 5 of their last 21 league games, eventually finishing 12th. They finished 17th the following season. The feud between Sexton and Osgood and Hudson reached a peak after a 4–2 home defeat to West Ham United on Boxing Day 1973, after Chelsea had led 2–0 at half-time; the pair were both sold a few months later. Sexton himself was sacked early into the 1974–75 season after a poor start, and succeeded by his assistant, Ron Suart, who was unable to reverse the club's decline and they were relegated in 1975.

The building of the East Stand, which retains its place in the modern stadium, formed part of a plan to create a 60,000 all-seater stadium and contributed to the club's financial problems. The project coincided with a world economic crisis and was affected by delays, a builders' strike and shortages of materials. Costs increased, and the club's debts stood at £4 million by 1977. As a result, between August 1974 and June 1978, Chelsea were unable to buy a single player. The decline of the team was matched by a decline in attendances, while a section of Chelsea's support became associated with violence and football hooliganism. The late 1970s and the 1980s saw the height of football hooliganism in Britain; while the problem was widespread, Chelsea's hooligan element remained a recurring issue for the club during this period.

In the mid-1970s, Chelsea fans were "involved in... many incidents of violence, vandalism and general mayhem". At Luton Town, Chelsea supporters invaded the pitch, smashed shop windows en route back to Luton station, and then set light to their Football Special, resulting in over 100 arrests. During a match against Charlton Athletic at The Valley in 1977, Chelsea fans lit fires on the terraces. In 1976–77, both league matches against Millwall, another club with a notorious hooligan element among their support, were marred by crowd violence. The hooliganism prompted Minister for Sport Denis Howell to ban Chelsea fans from away matches in April 1977 – a similar restriction was also placed on Manchester United fans – although thousands of Chelsea fans defied the ban and travelled to the following match against Wolverhampton Wanderers.

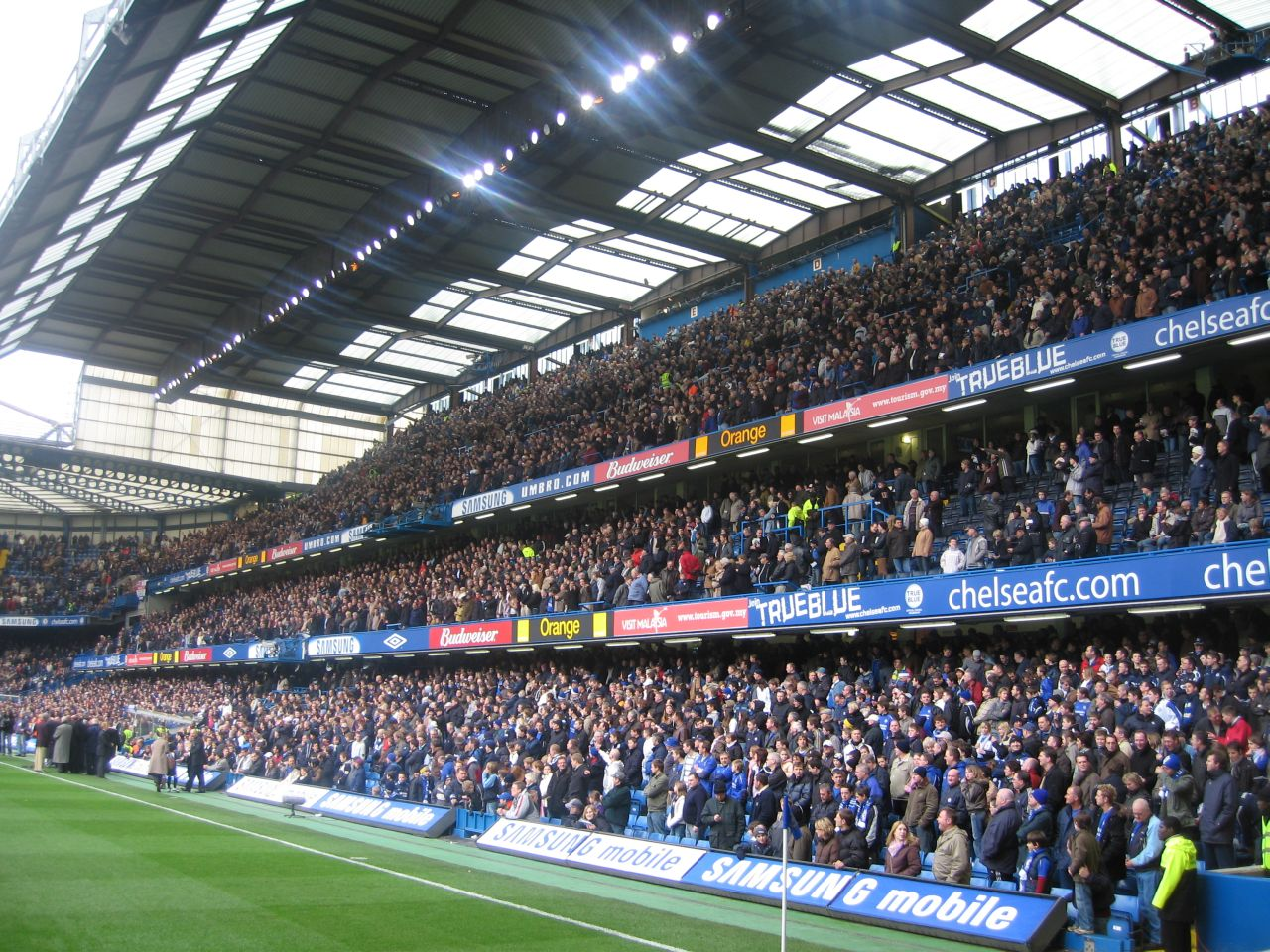
The East Stand, one of the main causes of Chelsea's financial problems in the 1970s and 1980s

Former left-back Eddie McCreadie became manager shortly before Chelsea's relegation in 1975 and, after a year of consolidation in 1975–76, led the side to promotion again in 1976–77 with a team composed of youth players, most notably Ray Wilkins and 24-goal striker Steve Finnieston, and veterans from earlier periods like Cooke, Harris and Bonetti. McCreadie left following a contract dispute with chairman Brian Mears over a company car and another ex-player was appointed, this time former right-back Ken Shellito.

Shellito kept Chelsea in the First Division in 1977–78, with a 4–2 win over European champions Liverpool in the FA Cup among the season's notable results. Shellito resigned midway through the following season with the club having won just three league games by Christmas. The brief return of Osgood did little to improve the club's results. Shellito's successor, former double-winning Tottenham Hotspur captain Danny Blanchflower, was unable to prevent another relegation, as the club finished the season with five league wins and 27 defeats.

Wilkins, one of the club's few remaining prominent players, was sold to Manchester United and England's 1966 World Cup final player Geoff Hurst became manager in September 1979 with Bobby Gould as his assistant. Their arrival saw an immediate improvement in Chelsea's form, and for a large period Chelsea topped the Second Division table, but a late decline saw them finish fourth, meaning the club missed out on promotion on goal difference. In the next season the team struggled to score goals, going on a nine-match run without one, winning only 3 matches in 20 and finishing 12th in 1980–81. Hurst was sacked.

In 1981, Mears resigned as chairman, ending his family's 76-year association with the club. One of Mears' last actions was to appoint former Wrexham boss John Neal as manager. A year later, Chelsea Football & Athletic Company, heavily in debt and unable to pay its players, was acquired from the Mears family interests by businessman and one-time chairman of Oldham Athletic, Ken Bates, for the sum of £1, though for reasons which remain disputed, he did not buy SB Properties, the company which now owned the Stamford Bridge freehold. By this point, Chelsea were in a serious financial state and losing £12,000 a week. Bates would later describe what he took over as "a social club with a little football played on a Saturday".

There were hangers-on in the wrong areas, all over the club. I wrote everything off and started again. Chelsea used to have a bootman to clean the boots. The apprentices just stood around watching him clean away. He went. The directors had their own chauffeur to drive them around town. He went. Even the lottery lost money. How? There were just two birds selling tickets. They went.

In 1981–82, a season during which Chelsea again finished 12th, Chelsea went on their first significant FA Cup run for years and drew European champions Liverpool in the fifth round. They won 2–0. In the quarter-finals, they were drawn against rivals Tottenham who won 3–2, despite Chelsea taking the lead through Mike Fillery. The 1982–83 season was among the most difficult in Chelsea's history. Following a strong start, the team went on a nine-match winless run as the season drew to a close and faced relegation to the Third Division, which would have added to the club's financial problems. In the penultimate game of the season at fellow strugglers Bolton Wanderers, Clive Walker hit a last-minute winner from 25 yards (23 m) to ensure a 1–0 win. A draw at home to Middlesbrough in the final game ensured the club's survival by two points.

== Battle for the Bridge ==
As noted above, when Bates bought Chelsea in 1982, he only bought the club and not SB Properties, the company which now owned the freehold of Stamford Bridge; the club and the stadium had been separated in financial restructuring during the late 1970s. Bates initially agreed a seven-year lease, which would keep Chelsea at Stamford Bridge while its future was decided.

According to Bates, he and David Mears, the majority shareholder of SB Properties, agreed a deal which would see Chelsea acquire Mears' stake in SB Properties for £450,000. Bates, however, later discovered that Mears was also in discussions with Crystal Palace owner Ron Noades, with a view to moving Chelsea away from Stamford Bridge and have them ground share with Palace at Selhurst Park. Mears and Lord Chelsea subsequently sold their shares in SB Properties to property developers Marler Estates, giving Marler a 70% stake in the company. This began a campaign by Marler to force Chelsea out of Stamford Bridge so it could be sold off and redeveloped.

Over the next decade, Bates pursued a campaign against Marler, acquiring a minority stake in SB Properties and initiating a series of court injunctions and delaying tactics intended to challenge Marler's plans. He also launched the "Save the Bridge" campaign, with the aim of raising £15 million to acquire the freehold from Marler. Marler in turn put forward several schemes which would see Chelsea removed from Stamford Bridge. David Bulstrode, chairman of Marler, proposed a merger between Fulham and Queens Park Rangers, with Chelsea then relocating to Rangers' Loftus Road stadium. In March 1986, Marler's plans to redevelop the Stamford Bridge site without Chelsea were approved by Hammersmith and Fulham Council; the council reversed its policy when the Labour Party gained control of it in May 1986. In December 1987, Bates' own plans to redevelop Stamford Bridge into a modern football stadium were approved by the council's planning committee.

Chelsea were served notice to quit Stamford Bridge upon the expiry of the lease in 1989. Cabra Estates, which had purchased Marler in 1989, were bankrupted in the property market crash of 1992. This enabled Bates to do a deal with their creditors, the Royal Bank of Scotland, and reunite the freehold with the club. Bates then created the Chelsea Pitch Owners, a non-profit organisation owned by the fans which in 1997 purchased the freehold of the stadium, the club's naming rights and the pitch to prevent property developers from purchasing Stamford Bridge. Following this, work began to renovate the entire stadium (bar the East Stand), making it all-seater and bringing the stands closer to the pitch and under cover. The work was completed by the millennium.
