= 1955 FA Charity Shield =

- Event: FA Charity Shield
Chelsea	Newcastle United
3	0
- Date: 14 September 1955
- Venue: Stamford Bridge, London
- Attendance: 12,802

The 1955 FA Charity Shield was the 33rd FA Charity Shield, the annual football match played between the winners of the previous season's Football League and FA Cup competitions. It was contested between Chelsea, the reigning First Division champions, and Newcastle United, holders of the FA Cup. Chelsea won 3–0, thanks to second-half goals from Roy Bentley and Frank Blunstone, and an own goal from Alf McMichael.

== Match details ==
14 September 1955

Chelsea	3–0	Newcastle United
McMichael (o.g.); Bentley; Blunstone

Stamford Bridge, London
Attendance: 12,802

GK	1	(Scotland) Bill Robertson
RB	2	(England) Peter Sillett
LB	3	(England) Stan Willemse
RH	4	(England) Ken Armstrong
CH	5	(England) Stan Wicks
LH	6	(England) Derek Saunders
OR	7	(England) Eric Parsons
IR	8	(England) Peter Brabrook
CF	9	(England) Roy Bentley (c)
IL	10	(England) Les Stubbs
OL	11	(England) Frank Blunstone
Manager:
(England) Ted Drake

GK	1	(England) John Thompson
RB	2	(England) George Lackenby
LB	3	(Northern Ireland) Alf McMichael
RH	4	(Scotland) Jimmy Scoular (c)
CH	5	(Scotland) Frank Brennan
LH	6	(Northern Ireland) Tommy Casey
OR	7	(England) Len White
IR	8	(Wales) Reg Davies
CF	9	(England) Jackie Milburn
IL	10	(England) George Hannah
OL	11	(Scotland) Bill Punton
Manager:
(Scotland) Doug Livingstone

Match rules

- 90 minutes
- Title shared if scores level
- No substitutions

== See also ==
- 1954–55 Football League
- 1954–55 FA Cup
