= Les Stubbs =

English footballer

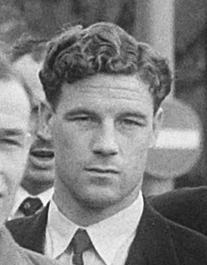
- Les Stubbs, May 1955

Personal information
- Full name: Leslie Levi Stubbs
- Date of birth: 18 December 1929
- Date of death: 1 February 2011 (aged 81)
- Position: Inside forward

Senior career*
Years	Team	Apps	(Gls)
–1948	Great Wakering Rovers		
1948–1952	Southend United	83	(40)
1952–1958	Chelsea	112	(34)
1958–1960	Southend United	22	(3)
1960–1961	Bedford Town	36	(21)
- * Club domestic league appearances and goals

Leslie "Les" Stubbs (18 December 1929 – 1 February 2011) was an English footballer.

Playing mainly as an inside forward, Stubbs started out with his local side, Great Wakering Rovers before signing for Southend United. He made his debut for Southend in 1948 and scored 45 goals in 88 games over the next four seasons. In November 1952, he joined Chelsea for £10,000 having been persuaded by Blues manager Ted Drake that he was capable of playing in the top tier.

His career with Chelsea started slowly and Stubbs played just five games in his first season, without scoring. However, he scored nine goals in thirty league games in 1953–54 and in the next helped Chelsea win their first League title. He scored five goals that season, including a crucial stoppage time equaliser against Chelsea's main rivals Wolverhampton Wanderers at Molineux, paving the way for teammate Roy Bentley's winner a minute later. He then helped Chelsea win the Charity Shield.

Stubbs' later years at Chelsea saw his playing opportunities reduced by the emergence of talented youngsters such as Jimmy Greaves, Peter Brabrook and Ron Tindall. He made only sixteen appearances in his final two seasons, though he did play for the representative London XI side which competed in the 1955–58 Inter-Cities Fairs Cup. Stubbs ended his Chelsea career with 123 appearances and 35 goals to his name. He left in 1958 to re-join Southend for a further two years, scoring 3 goals in 23 games. He later turned out for Bedford Town before re-joining Great Wakering Rovers, where he remains the most successful product of that club.

When Chelsea won the FA Premier League title in 2004–05, Stubbs and his surviving teammates from the 1954–55 title-winning side, such as Roy Bentley, Stan Willemse, Frank Blunstone and Jim Lewis were invited to the trophy presentation.
