= Blunstone =

Blunstone is a surname. Notable people with the surname include:

- Colin Blunstone (born 1945), English singer and member of The Zombies
- Frank Blunstone (born 1934), English footballer
