= Johnny McNichol =

Scottish footballer (1925–2007)

- Pictured in Brighton & Hove Albion kit

Personal information
- Full name: John McNichol
- Date of birth: 20 August 1925
- Place of birth: Kilmarnock, Scotland
- Date of death: 17 March 2007 (aged 81)
- Position: Inside forward

Senior career*
Years	Team	Apps	(Gls)
–	Hurlford United		
1946–1948	Newcastle United	0	(0)
1948–1952	Brighton & Hove Albion	158	(37)
1952–1958	Chelsea	181	(59)
1958–1963	Crystal Palace	189	(15)
1963–1967	Tunbridge Wells Rangers		
Total		528	(111)

Managerial career
- 1963–1967: Tunbridge Wells Rangers (player-manager)
- * Club domestic league appearances and goals

John McNichol (20 August 1925 – 17 March 2007) was a Scottish footballer who played more than 500 games in the Football League in England. An inside forward, he played more than 150 games for Brighton & Hove Albion and more than 200 for each of Chelsea and Crystal Palace.

McNichol graduated from junior footballer and apprentice motor mechanic in his native Scotland to a professional contract with English First Division club Newcastle United. After two years, he had found success with the reserve team but was never selected in the first eleven. Brighton & Hove Albion, struggling in the Third Division, broke their transfer record to sign him. McNichol spent four years with the club, acquiring "the reputation as the finest inside-forward in the Third Division", before moving to the First Division as Chelsea manager Ted Drake's first signing. He was part of the Chelsea team that won the League championship in the 1954–55 season. In 1958 he joined Crystal Palace, whom he captained to promotion from the Fourth Division, and finished his on-field career in the Southern League as player-manager of Tunbridge Wells Rangers. He then spent 25 years working on the commercial side of football with two of his previous clubs.

== Early life and career ==
McNichol was born in Kilmarnock, Ayrshire. His father, Danny, died when he was five, so McNichol and seven siblings were raised by their mother, Catherine. He attended St Joseph's School in Kilmarnock, and started work as a messenger boy for a local draper's shop when he left school. His shop work stopped him playing football on Saturdays, but he was able to play some midweek football for Junior club Hurlford United. When he was taken on at the local bus garage as an apprentice motor mechanic, he became available on Saturdays as well. Hurlford paid him ten shillings a game, nearly as much as his apprentice's wages. During the Second World War, McNichol was called up to the Fleet Air Arm as a mechanic, but was able to play friendly matches for Inverness-based club Clachnacuddin. Because of the number of professional players stationed around the country, such matches were played at a fairly high standard.

== Newcastle United ==
After the war, McNichol returned to Hurlford, but, amid interest from other clubs, he accepted a trial with Newcastle United. After two trial matches, he signed professional forms with the club on his 21st birthday. McNichol spent two years at Newcastle, but never made a first-team appearance. Behind the likes of England international forwards Roy Bentley and Len Shackleton in the pecking order, he doubled his income working as a motor mechanic for a local funeral director whose "two or three Rolls-Royces [made] a nice change from working on bus engines". In his second season, he was part of the reserve team that won the Central League title, but a disagreement over personal terms on his contract renewal – the Newcastle management felt a lower wage was justified because of the player's earnings outside the game – prompted McNichol to seek first-team football elsewhere.

== Brighton & Hove Albion ==
Brighton & Hove Albion had finished bottom of the Third Division South the season before and were struggling financially, yet manager Don Welsh persuaded the directors to break the club transfer record by paying £5,000 for a player yet to make his debut in the Football League, and persuaded McNichol to sign. He made his first appearance in the League on 21 August 1948, at the age of 23, as Brighton drew with Swindon Town at home. The club finished sixth in the division in McNichol's first season and eighth, despite having no regular goalscorer – McNichol's nine goals made him top scorer – in 1949–50. The next year, McNichol played in all of Brighton's games, the only man so to do, and again finished as top scorer for the season, this time with 14 goals. According to Carder and Harris, he "had a superb season with a brand of play which won him the reputation as the finest inside-forward in the Third Division". Appointed club captain when Billy Lane took over from Welsh as manager, McNichol flourished under Lane's attacking policy. He scored 14 goals in the 1951–52 season as Brighton narrowly failed to mount a successful challenge to Plymouth Argyle for the title, "was again the star of the side", and "was thought by many to be the most stylish inside-forward to play for the Albion".

That season, McNichol scored a hat-trick against eventual runners-up Reading, which caught the eye of manager Ted Drake. Shortly before the next season started, he became Drake's first signing for his new club, Chelsea, at a fee of £12,000 plus the player Jimmy Leadbetter, a club record fee received for Albion. He had scored 39 goals in all competitions from 165 appearances. Although scouts from bigger clubs had been watching the player since soon after his arrival at the club – he had apparently already turned down moves to Manchester City, Everton and Huddersfield Town – Brighton's supporters were disappointed, seeing his sale as a backward step.

== Chelsea ==
On his Chelsea debut away at Manchester United, McNichol found himself playing at right back after ten minutes when Sid Tickridge sustained an injury. Once restored to the forward line, his goals helped Chelsea avoid relegation to the Second Division at the end of his first season. A "dramatic last-minute goal ... enabled Chelsea to snatch a lucky victory at West Bromwich" with three games left, and he scored the third goal of Chelsea's 3–1 defeat of Manchester City in their last fixture of the season which confirmed their escape from the relegation positions.

Two seasons later, Chelsea won the First Division title for the first time. As they beat Charlton Athletic in March 1955 to "maintain their challenging position in the Championship", The Times' reporter described how "McNichol filled the role of general, and was instigator of many dangerous movements". Two weeks later, McNichol, "the most effective of their forwards", scored twice as a Chelsea team displaying "a propensity to play the man in preference to the ball" beat Tottenham Hotspur 4–2, and the title was confirmed with one game still to play. McNichol had missed only two games in the 42-game season, and scored 14 goals, a good return for a player in his position; an inside forward was normally more a creator than a scorer of goals, but his profile on Chelsea's website describes him as "clever, astute and most of all a clinical finisher".

He stayed at the club for three more seasons, but later lost his place in the side to the young Jimmy Greaves: "There was no disgrace in losing my place to him. I couldn't grumble about that. We used to get on very well, and he would listen to the instructions I gave him. Then he became world famous!" The respect was mutual: though Greaves described the Chelsea title-winning side as "almost certainly one of the least talented teams ever to win the title", he made an exception for McNichol, "the ball player of the team". In all competitions, he made 202 appearances for Chelsea and scored 66 goals.

While at Brighton, McNichol had worked in a local garage, wanting to keep up his skills in case injury put an early end to his football career. When he joined Chelsea, his decision to remain living in the area had upset Drake. In addition, he bought a newsagent's shop in Hove, so not only did he have to travel by train from the south coast – as did teammates Stan Willemse and Eric Parsons – he further annoyed the Chelsea management by getting up even earlier each morning to open the shop before coming in to training. His wife Connie, whom he had known since childhood, ran the business in his absence. He claimed to have "earned more working in that shop than playing for Chelsea. Even in that championship season."

== Crystal Palace ==
Just ahead of the transfer deadline in March 1958, McNichol signed for Third Division South club Crystal Palace. He was expected to fill a role "similar to the one he has performed so well at Stamford Bridge – helping in the development of promising young forwards", and was appointed captain. He scored on his debut for the club, and produced seven goals from the twelve games he played in what remained of the 1957–58 season. By October 1958, manager George Smith felt the player was feeling the strain of his dual role, so relieved him of the captaincy. As McNichol grew older, his playing position became more defensive, as he became first a wing half, then a full back. Palace had been placed in the Fourth Division when the Football League structure was reorganised on national lines prior to the 1958–59 season, and McNichol, long since restored to the captaincy, led them to promotion to the Third Division in 1961, their first promotion for 40 years. Soon afterwards, he applied for the managerial post at former club Brighton & Hove Albion, then in the Second Division, but was unsuccessful. A broken arm suffered in August 1961 forced McNichol to miss a Palace match for the first time in a three-and-a-half-year club career. He played on for two seasons, but his professional career was brought to a close by facial injuries, a fractured cheekbone and broken jaw, sustained during the 1962–63 season. In all competitions, he scored 15 goals from 205 appearances.

== Later life and career ==
McNichol remained in the South of England, spending four years as player-manager of Tunbridge Wells Rangers in the Southern League. Having sold the newsagents, he returned to Crystal Palace to work in the commercial side of the game, where he was responsible for the establishment of weekly pools and bingo competitions as a means of raising funds for the club. He moved back to Brighton & Hove Albion to occupy a similar role from 1979 to 1992, and after retirement continued to live in the Saltdean area of Brighton.

Despite the successes of his career, McNichol had regrets. He described Chelsea's decision not to accept their invitation to participate in the inaugural season of the European Cup as his "one big disappointment", and "thought it was strange at the time", despite the national team selectors' preference for players plying their trade for Scottish clubs, that he was never chosen to represent his country.

McNichol retained contact with his previous clubs. One of 24 former players and managers nominated as "Albion Legends" as part of Brighton's centenary events in 2001, he took an active role in the celebrations.

He died of a stroke on 17 March 2007 at the age of 81.

== Honours ==
Newcastle United Reserves

- The Central League winners: 1947–48

Chelsea

- Football League First Division winners: 1954–55

Crystal Palace

- Football League Fourth Division runners-up: 1960–61

== See also ==
- List of footballers in England by number of league appearances (500+)
