= Aston Villa 1–7 Arsenal (1935) =

Aston Villa v. Arsenal
- Event: 1935–36 First Division
Aston Villa	Arsenal
1	7
- Date: 14 December 1935
- Venue: Villa Park, Birmingham
- Attendance: 60,891

The 1935–36 season First Division match between Aston Villa and Arsenal at Villa Park took place on 14 December 1935. Arsenal won the fixture 7–1 with all of their seven goals scored by striker Ted Drake, a record haul for a top flight fixture, and a record for any division at the time. The top-flight record still stands today.

== Background ==
Arsenal crest at the time

Aston Villa and Arsenal enjoyed a great rivalry at the time and there had been several memorable contests between the sides since 1930. Aston Villa sat bottom of the league but had just invested some £24,000 in a number of new players and were expected to improve considerably as a result. Arsenal were missing star player Alex James and striker Ted Drake had a heavily strapped knee.

== Match details ==
14 December 1935

Aston Villa	1–7	Arsenal
Palethorpe		Drake

Villa Park, Birmingham
Attendance: 60,891

Aston Villa
Arsenal

=== Summary ===
Despite playing six internationals, Aston Villa were losing 3–0 at half time after a Drake hat-trick. He had a double hat-trick by the hour, with Villa then scoring their only goal through Jack Palethorpe. Drake then had an effort hit the crossbar and bounce downwards though the goal was disallowed with officials ruling the ball had not crossed the line. However, Drake still secured the goal-scoring record in the final minute of the game. In total, Drake had just nine shots, all on target with one saved.

== Records ==
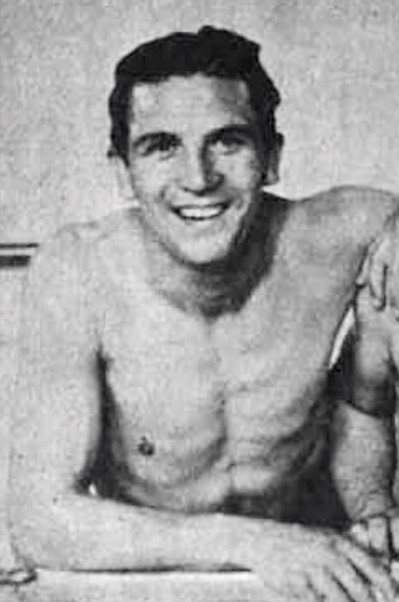
Ted Drake in 1939

Drake's seven goals equalled the total Jimmy Ross was alleged to have scored in a game for Preston North End against Stoke (later Stoke City) in 1888, though it was not until years later it was established that Ross had only scored four. The record for all divisions was broken just 12 days after Drake's tally by Bunny Bell of Tranmere Rovers in the Football League Third Division North, who scored nine against Oldham Athletic.

== Aftermath ==
Aston Villa went on to be relegated for the first time in their history at the end of the season. Arsenal failed to win a fourth consecutive league title but went on to lift the FA Cup with Drake scoring the only goal of the game.
