= Stan Wicks =

English footballer

Personal information
- Full name: Stanley Maurice Wicks
- Date of birth: 11 July 1928
- Place of birth: Reading, England
- Date of death: 1983 (aged 55)
- Place of death: England
- Position: Centre half

Youth career
- –1948: Castle St. Institute

Senior career*
Years	Team	Apps	(Gls)
1948–1954	Reading	168	(1)
1954–1957	Chelsea	71	(1)
Total		239	(2)
- * Club domestic league appearances and goals

Stan Maurice Wicks (11 July 1928 – 1983) was an English professional footballer who played for Reading and Chelsea. Wicks won the League Championship in 1955 with Chelsea, making 21 league appearances that season. He was named by manager Ted Drake as one of his best acquisitions for Chelsea.

Wicks retired from football due to injury in 1957 and died from cancer in 1983, at the age of 55.
