= John Thompson (footballer, born 1932) =

English footballer

Personal information
- Full name: John Henry Thompson
- Date of birth: 4 July 1932
- Place of birth: Newcastle upon Tyne, England
- Date of death: 29 December 2006 (aged 74)
- Position: Goalkeeper

Youth career
- –: Newcastle United

Senior career*
Years	Team	Apps	(Gls)
1950–1957	Newcastle United	8	(0)
1957–1959	Lincoln City	42	(0)
- Horden Colliery Welfare
- * Club domestic league appearances and goals

John Henry Thompson (4 July 1932 – 29 December 2006) was an English footballer who made 50 appearances in the Football League playing as a goalkeeper for Newcastle United and Lincoln City.

Thompson was born in Newcastle upon Tyne and began his football career as an apprentice with his local Football League club, Newcastle United. He played eight matches in the First Division, and played in the 1955 FA Charity Shield, in which Newcastle lost 3–0 to Chelsea. He was third choice, behind Jack Fairbrother and Ronnie Simpson, and left for Second Division club Lincoln City in 1957 for a fee of £2,500. He played regularly during his first season with Lincoln, but lost his place to Bill Heath and others, and then moved into non-league football with Horden Colliery Welfare. He died in 2006 at the age of 74.
