= Seamus O'Connell (footballer) =

English footballer

Seamus O'Connell (11 January 1930 – 24 February 2013) was an English amateur footballer who played in the Scottish Football League for Queens Park and in the Football League for Middlesbrough, Chelsea and Carlisle United during the 1950s.

O'Connell was born in Carlisle. His cousin Sean O'Connell was an all-time great Gaelic footballer who played for Derry.

A forward, O'Connell divided his playing time with working for his family's cattle-farming business. He played for Scottish amateur club Queens Park, and made his English Football League debut for Middlesbrough on Boxing Day 1953, scoring in a 3–2 win against Newcastle United. He joined Chelsea in August 1954 and scored a hat-trick on his debut (one of only two Chelsea players to do this, the other being George Hilsdon) against Manchester United in October 1954, although his side still lost 6–5. The season was nonetheless a success for O'Connell and Chelsea, as he scored seven goals in ten league games and helped the club win their first League Championship.

O'Connell remained with Chelsea for another season before returning to the amateur game, and ended his time at the club with 12 goals from 17 games. He was a three-time winner of the FA Amateur Cup, with Bishop Auckland in 1955 and 1956, and Crook Town in 1959. He won four caps for the England amateurs.

Having suffered a stroke in 2006, O'Connell died on 24 February 2013.
