= Jim Lewis (footballer, born 1927) =

English footballer

Personal information
- Full name: James Lewis
- Date of birth: 26 June 1927
- Place of birth: Hackney, London, England
- Date of death: 21 November 2011 (aged 84)
- Place of death: Kelvedon Hatch, England
- Positions: Striker; inside forward

Senior career*
Years	Team	Apps	(Gls)
1945–1950	Walthamstow Avenue		
1950	Leyton Orient	4	(0)
1950–1952	Walthamstow Avenue		
1952–1958	Chelsea	90	(38)
1958–1968	Walthamstow Avenue		

International career
1954	England amateurs	49	(8)
- * Club domestic league appearances and goals

James Lewis (26 June 1927 – 21 November 2011) was an English footballer. He was one of the most successful amateur footballers of his generation.

== Biography ==
Lewis, educated at the Monoux School, Walthamstow, began his football career as a 16-year-old with the famous amateur side Walthamstow Avenue (his father had also played for them) and in three stints with the club scored 423 goals in 522 appearances, mainly as a centre forward. He had briefly left Walthamstow in November 1950 to play for Leyton Orient, but after playing as an amateur in 4 League games he rejected their contract terms. Lewis was a key part of the Walthamstow side which reached the FA Cup fourth round in 1953, beating sides such as Stockport County and Watford and drawing 1–1 with Manchester United at Old Trafford, before losing 5–2 in the replay. Just days later, Lewis received a telephone call from Chelsea manager Ted Drake, and promptly signed for the club.

In the days when the disparity between the pay of amateur and professional footballers was minimal, Lewis never turned professional, although his Chelsea teammate Derek Saunders, who also played for Walthamstow, did. He juggled his playing time with working as a salesman for Thermos flasks which, unlike many of his fellow players, allowed him to have a car. With Roy Bentley established as Chelsea's centre forward, Lewis was switched to either outside or inside left. He made his Chelsea debut in October 1952 against Charlton Athletic and scored in a 2–2 draw.

His most noteworthy contribution to Chelsea was to be a member of their 1954–55 championship-winning side. He played in 17 league games that season, and scored 6 goals, including crucial goals in wins over Bolton Wanderers, Sheffield United and Tottenham Hotspur. Chelsea's professional players each received a suit to commemorate the success, but Lewis instead received an illuminated address from the club. Lewis remained with Chelsea until 1958, and scored 40 goals in 95 appearances for the club. He was also a member of the representative London XI which competed in the Inter-Cities Fairs Cup in 1958. He played in the 6–0 second-leg loss in the final against FC Barcelona.

Lewis won 49 caps for the England amateur national side, and also played for the Great Britain football team at the 1952, 1956 and 1960 Olympic Games.
