= Stan Willemse =

English footballer

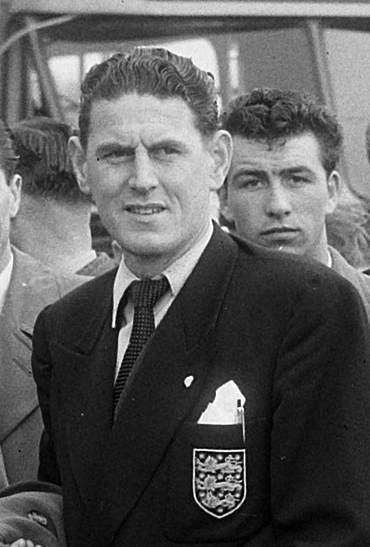
- Stan Willemse, May 1955

Personal information
- Full name: Stanley Bernard Willemse
- Date of birth: 23 August 1924
- Place of birth: Brighton, England
- Date of death: 5 August 2011 (aged 86)
- Place of death: Brighton, England
- Position: Left back

Senior career*
Years	Team	Apps	(Gls)
1946–1949	Brighton & Hove Albion	91	(3)
1949–1956	Chelsea	198	(2)
1956–1958	Leyton Orient	59	(2)
- * Club domestic league appearances and goals

Stanley Bernard Willemse (23 August 1924 – 5 August 2011) was an English footballer who played as a left-back in the Football League for Brighton and Hove Albion, Chelsea and Leyton Orient.

Born in Brighton, Willemse served in the Royal Marines during the Second World War, and began his football career with Brighton & Hove Albion before signing for Londoners Chelsea in 1949 for £6,000, a sum which helped fund rebuilding work at Brighton's Goldstone Ground. He earned a reputation as a hard-tackling defender whilst with the club, and formed the backbone of the team which won the League Championship in 1954–55, alongside the likes of Roy Bentley, Ken Armstrong, Eric Parsons and Derek Saunders, playing 39 games that season.

Willemse also featured in the representative London XI side which reached the final of the 1955–58 Inter-Cities Fairs Cup. He only remained at Chelsea for one more season after that, and signed for Leyton Orient in 1956.

When Chelsea won the title again in the 2004–05 season, Willemse and fellow 1955 title-winner Roy Bentley carried out the trophy at Stamford Bridge for it to be presented to captain John Terry. As of 2005, he was living in Brighton.

Willemse died in Brighton on 5 August 2011 at the age of 86.
