= Peter Sillett =

English footballer (1933–1998)

Personal information
- Full name: Richard Peter Tudor Sillett
- Date of birth: 1 February 1933
- Place of birth: Southampton, England
- Date of death: 13 March 1998 (aged 65)
- Place of death: Ashford, Kent, England
- Height: 6 ft 0 in (1.83 m)
- Position: Right-back

Youth career
- 1949–1950: Southampton

Senior career*
Years	Team	Apps	(Gls)
1950–1953	Southampton	59	(4)
1953–1962	Chelsea	260	(29)
1962–1965	Guildford City		
1965–1973	Ashford Town		
Total		319	(33)

International career
1955	England U23	3	(0)
1955	England	3	(0)
1957	England B	1	(0)

Managerial career
- 1965–1973: Ashford Town
- 1979–1983: Hastings United
- 1985–1987: Ashford Town
- 1987–1988: Poole Town
- 1988–1992: Hastings Town
- * Club domestic league appearances and goals

Richard Peter Tudor Sillett (1 February 1933 – 13 March 1998) was an English footballer. He played for Chelsea and Southampton as a right-back, and made three appearances for England. He was the older brother of John Sillett, who managed Coventry City to FA Cup success in 1987. Sir Stanley Matthews once said that Sillett was the best full-back he ever played against.

== Club career ==
=== Southampton ===
Peter was the son of Charlie Sillett (who was a full-back with Southampton from 1931 to 1938) and inherited his father's skills. He joined the Saints in January 1949 and soon afterwards gained England Youth recognition.

Weighing over 13 stone when only 18, Sillett matured quickly into a full-back of some distinction.

Southampton were facing mounting debts and, with this fact known to many of the country's top clubs, Sillett, together with his younger brother John, was "induced" to join Ted Drake's Chelsea, for a fee of £12,000.

In his two seasons at The Dell, he made 65 appearances in all competitions and scored four goals.

=== Chelsea ===
Sillett signed for Chelsea in 1953 and became club's established full-back when fit. A strong defender with a powerful shot, he scored 34 goals for Chelsea, which made him the highest scoring defender in the club's history until being overtaken recently by John Terry, and is acclaimed for scoring what is widely perceived as the 1954–55 title-winning goal. During a match against Chelsea's principal rivals, Wolves on Easter Saturday 1955 in front of a crowd of 75,043, Chelsea were awarded a penalty with that game at 0–0 after Wolves captain Billy Wright had handled the ball in the penalty area. Sillett stepped up to take it and nervelessly smashed the ball past goalkeeper Bert Williams to give Chelsea a 1–0 win and complete a league double over Wolves, one of five goals he netted in the run-in. Chelsea went on to wrap up the title in their next home game, against Sheffield Wednesday.

Playing in London, Sillett received England Under-23 caps, followed by his first full international against France in May 1955. He also turned out for the representative London XI in the 1955-58 Inter-Cities Fairs Cup alongside Chelsea teammates Ken Armstrong, Derek Saunders and Jim Lewis, during which the side reached the final, though they lost on aggregate to FC Barcelona. Sillett captained the England under-23 side on four occasions in 1955 skippering teams that included Ronnie Clayton, Bobby Robson, Johnny Haynes and Duncan Edwards. That same year saw Sillett play for a Great Britain side against a Rest of Europe team to celebrate the Irish Football Association's 75th anniversary at Belfast's Windsor Park in a team that also comprised Danny Blanchflower, John Charles and Stanley Matthews.

Sillett was known for his accurate distribution and composed style of play, and he frequently took responsibility for set pieces. His long-range shooting ability made him a regular threat from distance, and he scored several goals from free kicks during his time at Stamford Bridge. In fact opponents' often used to place defensive "walls" even when Sillett struck free kicks from the halfway line such was his power and accuracy. Chelsea legend and captain of the 1954/5 championship winning side, Roy Bentley, described Peter Sillett as one of the greatest passers of a ball he has ever seen and the first man in the game that could regularly produce 100-yard passes direct to a teammate.

Sillett played the game with a calm, controlled style, avoiding unnecessary flair while demonstrating strong natural ability and consistency. Sillett was courted by Italian giants Juventus but turned down the move in typically laid back fashion by reportedly stating that Italy was "too bloody hot for football". Sillett is listed among only sixty-one English defenders rated on the Italian football website enciclopedia-football.com

England and Wolves captain and legend Billy Wright once said to Sillett’s brother, John, "If I was a 100-cap player, then so was Peter."

Sillett made a total of 288 appearances for Chelsea and remained at the club until June 1962, when new manager Tommy Docherty made a series of sweeping changes to the playing squad.

=== Later career ===
He moved to Guildford City and then on to Ashford Town as player-manager. He managed both Ashford Town and Hastings United twice each and oversaw promotion during each spell.

== England ==
Sillett was also an England international, winning three caps in 1955, and was in England's squad for the 1958 FIFA World Cup.

== Honours ==
Chelsea

- First Division championship: 1954–55
- FA Charity Shield: 1955
