= Eric Parsons =

English footballer

Personal information
- Full name: Eric George Parsons
- Date of birth: 9 November 1923
- Place of birth: Worthing, England
- Date of death: 7 February 2011 (aged 87)
- Place of death: Worthing, England
- Position: Outside forward

Senior career*
Years	Team	Apps	(Gls)
1947–1950	West Ham United	145	(34)
1950–1956	Chelsea	158	(37)
1956–1961	Brentford	118	(18)
- Dover

International career
1949	England B	2	(1)
- * Club domestic league appearances and goals

Eric George Parsons (9 November 1923 – 7 February 2011) was a footballer who played for West Ham United, Chelsea and Brentford in England.

== Career ==
An outside forward and crowd favourite whose blistering pace earned him the nickname "the Rabbit", Parsons started his career with West Ham United, spotted by the club during a game against West Ham Boys at Upton Park while playing for Worthing Boys. He played his first game for the Irons on 4 January 1947, in a Division Two game against Leicester City, then his second a week later against the same club in the FA Cup. He was an ever-present during the 1947–48 and 1948–49 seasons and made a total of 152 appearances for the club, scoring 35 goals. His last game came against Notts County on 25 November 1950.

He served in Montgomery's Eighth Army during the Second World War.

Parsons joined Chelsea in November 1950 for a then club record fee of £23,000. A pacy outside forward, Parsons was unfortunate to play in an era of great English outside forward, such as Stanley Matthews and Tom Finney, which limited his international opportunities to two "England B" caps. Nevertheless, Parsons formed an important part of Ted Drake's Chelsea side of the early 1950s, as both goalscorer and creator. Despite this, he was occasionally barracked by sections of the Chelsea crowd. He played in every game of Chelsea's Championship-winning side in 1955 and contributed 11 goals, including two in the 3–0 win over Sheffield Wednesday which clinched the title. During the title celebrations and speeches following the win over Wednesday, he finally won over the crowd at Stamford Bridge, who chanted "We want Rabbit."

Parsons left Chelsea in November 1956 for Brentford. He sustained a broken leg while at the club, but still managed to take his total to over 400 League appearances before retiring from football after a spell with Dover. When Chelsea won the Premier League title in 2004–05 Parsons was among several surviving members of the 1954–55 title-winning side to be invited to the trophy presentation at Stamford Bridge. He continued to live in his home town of Worthing and played for the town's bowling club. He died on 7 February 2011.
