= Frank Blunstone =

English football player and manager (born 1934)

Personal information
- Date of birth: 17 October 1934 (age 92)
- Place of birth: Crewe, England
- Position: Outside left

Senior career*
Years	Team	Apps	(Gls)
1951–1953	Crewe Alexandra	48	(12)
1953–1964	Chelsea	317	(47)
Total		365	(59)

International career
1954–1956	England U23	5	(3)
1954–1956	England	5	(0)
	The Football League XI	2	

Managerial career
- 1969–1973: Brentford
- 1979–1980: Ethnikos
- 1980: Aris
- 1984: Brentford
- * Club domestic league appearances and goals

Frank Blunstone (born 17 October 1934) is an English former footballer who played as an outside left for Crewe Alexandra, Chelsea and the England national team. As of July 2026, Blunstone is the earliest-surviving England senior international.

== Playing career ==
Blunstone started his career at Crewe Alexandra when he was just 16 years,and after surprisingly rejecting Wolverhampton Wanderers in favour of his home-town club, he signed professional terms with Crewe in early 1952. Following a string of impressive performances in Division Three North, he was signed by Chelsea manager Ted Drake for £7,500 a year later while still doing national service.

Blunstone made his Chelsea debut in a 3–2 victory over Tottenham Hotspur, at White Hart Lane in February 1953, scoring the decisive third goal. His early years at the club saw little success for the team, but in 1954–55 Chelsea became First Division champions, with Blunstone an important part of the side, though he continued to juggle appearances for Chelsea with his national service.

Between 1954 and 1956, Blunstone was capped on five occasions by England under-23s, scoring three goals, and also won five caps for the senior England team. Following an injury to Nat Lofthouse, he made his debut against Wales, creating two goals for teammate Roy Bentley in a 3–2 win. He also played in England's famous 7–2 win over Scotland at Wembley. He also won two caps for the Football League XI. Blunstone retired from playing in 1964 aged only 29, due to injury, having made 347 appearances for Chelsea and scored 54 goals

== Managerial career ==
Blunstone immediately joined the Chelsea coaching staff. He was later appointed Brentford manager in 1969 and led the team to the 5th round of the FA Cup in 1971 and promotion to the Third Division a year later. In 1973, after a disagreement with the Brentford chairman, he joined Manchester United which reunited him with his old boss at Chelsea, Tommy Docherty. Blunstone officially became assistant manager at United in 1976 after the departure of Paddy Crerand, but he had been that in all but name since his arrival at Manchester United. Blunstone was also heavily involved in the reserve team at United, working alongside reserve team managers, Bill Foulkes from 1973 to 1974, and then alongside Foulkes' successor, Jack Crompton, from 1974 to 1977. Blunstone later had brief spells as assistant manager of Derby County and manager of Greek clubs Ethnikos and Aris.

== Personal life ==
As of 2005, Blunstone was living in Weston, near Crewe. He is the president of Nantwich Town F.C., and still attends games. As of July 2026, Blunstone is the earliest-surviving England senior international.
