= 1954–55 Football League =

56th season of the Football League

The Football League
- Season: 1954–55
- Champions: Chelsea

The 1954–55 season was the 56th completed season of The Football League.

== Final league tables ==
The tables below are reproduced here in the exact form that they can be found at The Rec.Sport.Soccer Statistics Foundation website and in Rothmans Book of Football League Records 1888–89 to 1978–79, with home and away statistics separated.

Beginning with the season 1894–95, clubs finishing level on points were separated according to goal average (goals scored divided by goals conceded), or more properly put, goal ratio. In case one or more teams had the same goal difference, this system favoured those teams who had scored fewer goals. The goal average system was eventually scrapped beginning with the 1976–77 season.

From the 1922–23 season, the bottom two teams of both Third Division North and Third Division South were required to apply for re-election.

== First Division ==
First Division
- Season: 1954–55
- Champions: Chelsea; 1st English title
- Relegated: Leicester City; Sheffield Wednesday
- Matches: 462
- Goals: 1,572 (3.4 per match)
- Top goalscorer: Ronnie Allen (27 goals)
- Biggest home win: Preston North End 7–1 Cardiff City (1 September 1954); Preston North End 6–0 Sheffield Wednesday (30 October 1954)
- Biggest away win: Manchester City 1–6 Blackpool (23 April 1955)
- Highest scoring: Chelsea 5–6 Manchester United (16 October 1954)

Chelsea celebrated their 50th anniversary by winning the First Division title – the first major trophy of their history. They finished four points above runners-up and defending champions Wolverhampton Wanderers, who were level on points with Portsmouth and Sunderland. Manchester United recovered well after a slow start to the season and finished fifth. Leicester City and Sheffield Wednesday went down to the Second Division.

| Pos | Team | Pld | W | D | L | GF | GA | GAv | Pts | Qualification or relegation |
|---|---|---|---|---|---|---|---|---|---|---|
| 1 | Chelsea (C) | 42 | 20 | 12 | 10 | 81 | 57 | 1.421 | 52 | Denied entry to the European Cup (Note: Chelsea were invited to play at the inaugural European Cup but were barred from participation by The FA.) |
| 2 | Wolverhampton Wanderers | 42 | 19 | 10 | 13 | 89 | 70 | 1.271 | 48 | |
| 3 | Portsmouth | 42 | 18 | 12 | 12 | 74 | 62 | 1.194 | 48 | |
| 4 | Sunderland | 42 | 15 | 18 | 9 | 64 | 54 | 1.185 | 48 | |
| 5 | Manchester United | 42 | 20 | 7 | 15 | 84 | 74 | 1.135 | 47 | |
| 6 | Aston Villa | 42 | 20 | 7 | 15 | 72 | 73 | 0.986 | 47 | |
| 7 | Manchester City | 42 | 18 | 10 | 14 | 76 | 69 | 1.101 | 46 | |
| 8 | Newcastle United | 42 | 17 | 9 | 16 | 89 | 77 | 1.156 | 43 | |
| 9 | Arsenal | 42 | 17 | 9 | 16 | 69 | 63 | 1.095 | 43 | |
| 10 | Burnley | 42 | 17 | 9 | 16 | 51 | 48 | 1.063 | 43 | |
| 11 | Everton | 42 | 16 | 10 | 16 | 62 | 68 | 0.912 | 42 | |
| 12 | Huddersfield Town | 42 | 14 | 13 | 15 | 63 | 68 | 0.926 | 41 | |
| 13 | Sheffield United | 42 | 17 | 7 | 18 | 70 | 86 | 0.814 | 41 | |
| 14 | Preston North End | 42 | 16 | 8 | 18 | 83 | 64 | 1.297 | 40 | |
| 15 | Charlton Athletic | 42 | 15 | 10 | 17 | 76 | 75 | 1.013 | 40 | |
| 16 | Tottenham Hotspur | 42 | 16 | 8 | 18 | 72 | 73 | 0.986 | 40 | |
| 17 | West Bromwich Albion | 42 | 16 | 8 | 18 | 76 | 96 | 0.792 | 40 | |
| 18 | Bolton Wanderers | 42 | 13 | 13 | 16 | 62 | 69 | 0.899 | 39 | |
| 19 | Blackpool | 42 | 14 | 10 | 18 | 60 | 64 | 0.938 | 38 | |
| 20 | Cardiff City | 42 | 13 | 11 | 18 | 62 | 76 | 0.816 | 37 | |
| 21 | Leicester City (R) | 42 | 12 | 11 | 19 | 74 | 86 | 0.860 | 35 | Relegation to the Second Division |
| 22 | Sheffield Wednesday (R) | 42 | 8 | 10 | 24 | 63 | 100 | 0.630 | 26 | Relegation to the Second Division |

Source: World Football
Rules for classification: 1) Points; 2) Goal average; 3) Goals scored
(C) Champions; (R) Relegated

=== Results ===
| Home \ Away | ARS | AST | BLP | BOL | BUR | CAR | CHA | CHE | EVE | HUD | LEI | MCI | MUN | NEW | POR | PNE | SHU | SHW | SUN | TOT | WBA | WOL |
|---|---|---|---|---|---|---|---|---|---|---|---|---|---|---|---|---|---|---|---|---|---|---|
| Arsenal | | 2–0 | 3–0 | 3–0 | 4–0 | 2–0 | 3–1 | 1–0 | 2–0 | 3–5 | 1–1 | 2–3 | 2–3 | 1–3 | 0–1 | 2–0 | 4–0 | 3–2 | 1–3 | 2–0 | 2–2 | 1–1 |
| Aston Villa | 2–1 | | 3–1 | 3–0 | 3–1 | 0–2 | 1–2 | 3–2 | 0–2 | 0–0 | 2–5 | 2–0 | 2–1 | 1–2 | 1–0 | 1–3 | 3–1 | 0–0 | 2–2 | 2–4 | 3–0 | 4–2 |
| Blackpool | 2–2 | 0–1 | | 2–3 | 1–0 | 0–0 | 1–1 | 1–0 | 4–0 | 1–1 | 2–0 | 1–3 | 2–4 | 2–0 | 2–2 | 1–2 | 1–2 | 2–1 | 0–0 | 5–1 | 3–1 | 0–2 |
| Bolton Wanderers | 2–2 | 3–3 | 3–0 | | 0–1 | 0–0 | 3–2 | 2–5 | 2–0 | 1–0 | 4–1 | 2–2 | 1–1 | 2–1 | 3–1 | 2–1 | 1–0 | 2–2 | 3–0 | 1–2 | 2–4 | 6–1 |
| Burnley | 3–0 | 2–0 | 0–1 | 2–0 | | 1–0 | 3–0 | 1–1 | 0–2 | 1–1 | 3–1 | 2–0 | 2–4 | 0–1 | 1–0 | 2–2 | 2–1 | 2–0 | 0–1 | 1–2 | 0–2 | 1–0 |
| Cardiff City | 1–2 | 0–1 | 1–2 | 2–2 | 0–3 | | 4–3 | 0–1 | 4–3 | 1–1 | 2–1 | 3–0 | 3–0 | 4–2 | 1–1 | 2–5 | 1–1 | 5–3 | 0–1 | 1–2 | 3–2 | 3–2 |
| Charlton Athletic | 1–1 | 6–1 | 3–3 | 2–0 | 3–1 | 4–1 | | 0–2 | 5–0 | 2–1 | 2–3 | 1–1 | 1–1 | 1–1 | 2–2 | 0–4 | 3–1 | 3–0 | 1–3 | 1–2 | 1–3 | 1–3 |
| Chelsea | 1–1 | 4–0 | 0–0 | 3–2 | 1–0 | 1–1 | 1–2 | | 0–2 | 4–1 | 3–1 | 0–2 | 5–6 | 4–3 | 4–1 | 0–1 | 1–1 | 3–0 | 2–1 | 2–1 | 3–3 | 1–0 |
| Everton | 1–0 | 0–1 | 0–1 | 0–0 | 1–1 | 1–1 | 2–2 | 1–1 | | 4–0 | 2–2 | 1–0 | 4–2 | 1–2 | 2–3 | 1–0 | 2–3 | 3–1 | 1–0 | 1–0 | 1–2 | 3–2 |
| Huddersfield Town | 0–1 | 1–2 | 1–3 | 2–0 | 0–1 | 2–0 | 0–0 | 1–0 | 2–1 | | 3–1 | 0–0 | 1–3 | 2–0 | 2–1 | 0–4 | 1–2 | 3–0 | 1–1 | 1–0 | 3–3 | 2–0 |
| Leicester City | 3–3 | 4–2 | 2–2 | 4–0 | 2–2 | 2–1 | 0–1 | 1–1 | 2–2 | 1–3 | | 0–2 | 1–0 | 3–2 | 4–0 | 0–1 | 0–1 | 4–3 | 1–1 | 2–0 | 6–3 | 1–2 |
| Manchester City | 2–1 | 2–4 | 1–6 | 4–2 | 0–0 | 4–1 | 1–5 | 1–1 | 1–0 | 2–4 | 2–2 | | 3–2 | 3–1 | 1–2 | 3–1 | 5–2 | 2–2 | 1–0 | 0–0 | 4–0 | 3–0 |
| Manchester United | 2–1 | 0–1 | 4–1 | 1–1 | 1–0 | 5–2 | 3–1 | 2–1 | 1–2 | 1–1 | 3–1 | 0–5 | | 2–2 | 1–3 | 2–1 | 5–0 | 2–0 | 2–2 | 2–1 | 3–0 | 2–4 |
| Newcastle United | 5–1 | 5–3 | 1–1 | 0–0 | 2–1 | 3–0 | 3–1 | 1–3 | 4–0 | 2–2 | 2–0 | 2–0 | 2–0 | | 2–1 | 3–3 | 1–2 | 5–0 | 1–2 | 4–4 | 3–0 | 2–3 |
| Portsmouth | 2–1 | 2–2 | 3–0 | 1–0 | 0–2 | 1–3 | 2–0 | 0–0 | 5–0 | 4–2 | 2–1 | 1–0 | 0–0 | 3–1 | | 2–0 | 6–2 | 2–1 | 2–2 | 0–3 | 6–1 | 0–0 |
| Preston North End | 3–1 | 0–3 | 3–1 | 2–2 | 0–1 | 7–1 | 1–2 | 1–2 | 0–0 | 2–3 | 2–4 | 5–0 | 0–2 | 3–3 | 1–1 | | 1–2 | 6–0 | 3–1 | 1–0 | 3–1 | 3–3 |
| Sheffield United | 1–1 | 1–3 | 2–1 | 2–0 | 1–0 | 1–3 | 5–0 | 1–2 | 2–5 | 2–2 | 1–1 | 0–2 | 3–0 | 6–2 | 5–2 | 0–5 | | 1–0 | 1–0 | 4–1 | 1–2 | 1–2 |
| Sheffield Wednesday | 1–2 | 6–3 | 2–1 | 3–2 | 1–1 | 1–1 | 2–2 | 1–1 | 2–2 | 4–1 | 1–0 | 2–4 | 2–4 | 0–3 | 1–3 | 2–0 | 1–2 | | 1–2 | 2–2 | 5–0 | 2–2 |
| Sunderland | 0–1 | 0–0 | 2–0 | 1–1 | 2–2 | 1–1 | 1–2 | 3–3 | 3–0 | 1–1 | 1–1 | 3–2 | 4–3 | 4–2 | 2–2 | 2–1 | 2–2 | 2–0 | | 1–1 | 4–2 | 0–0 |
| Tottenham Hotspur | 0–1 | 1–1 | 3–2 | 2–0 | 0–3 | 0–2 | 1–4 | 2–4 | 1–3 | 1–1 | 5–1 | 2–2 | 0–2 | 2–1 | 1–1 | 3–1 | 5–0 | 7–2 | 0–1 | | 3–1 | 3–2 |
| West Bromwich Albion | 3–1 | 2–3 | 0–1 | 0–0 | 2–2 | 1–0 | 2–1 | 2–4 | 3–3 | 2–1 | 6–4 | 2–1 | 2–0 | 4–2 | 3–1 | 2–0 | 3–3 | 1–2 | 2–2 | 1–2 | | 1–0 |
| Wolverhampton Wanderers | 3–1 | 1–0 | 1–0 | 1–2 | 5–0 | 1–1 | 2–1 | 3–4 | 1–3 | 6–4 | 5–0 | 2–2 | 4–2 | 2–2 | 2–2 | 1–1 | 4–1 | 4–2 | 2–0 | 4–2 | 4–0 | |

Updated to match(es) played on unknown. Source: Ian Laschke: Rothmans Book of Football League Records 1888–89 to 1978–79. Macdonald and Jane’s, London & Sydney, 1980.
Legend: Blue = home team win; Yellow = draw; Red = away team win.

=== Maps ===
Locations of the Football League First Division London teams 1954–1955
Locations of the Football League First Division 1954–1955 teams

== Second Division ==
Second Division
- Season: 1954–55
- Champions: Birmingham City
- Promoted: Birmingham City; Luton Town
- Relegated: Ipswich Town; Derby County
- Inter-Cities Fairs Cup: Birmingham City
- Matches: 462
- Goals: 1,597 (3.46 per match)
- Top goalscorer: Tommy Briggs (33 goals)

| Pos | Team | Pld | W | D | L | GF | GA | GAv | Pts | Qualification or relegation |
|---|---|---|---|---|---|---|---|---|---|---|
| 1 | Birmingham City (C, P) | 42 | 22 | 10 | 10 | 92 | 47 | 1.957 | 54 | Inter-Cities Fairs Cup group stage and promotion to the First Division |
| 2 | Luton Town (P) | 42 | 23 | 8 | 11 | 88 | 53 | 1.660 | 54 | Promotion to the First Division |
| 3 | Rotherham United | 42 | 25 | 4 | 13 | 94 | 64 | 1.469 | 54 | |
| 4 | Leeds United | 42 | 23 | 7 | 12 | 70 | 53 | 1.321 | 53 | |
| 5 | Stoke City | 42 | 21 | 10 | 11 | 69 | 46 | 1.500 | 52 | |
| 6 | Blackburn Rovers | 42 | 22 | 6 | 14 | 114 | 79 | 1.443 | 50 | |
| 7 | Notts County | 42 | 21 | 6 | 15 | 74 | 71 | 1.042 | 48 | |
| 8 | West Ham United | 42 | 18 | 10 | 14 | 74 | 70 | 1.057 | 46 | |
| 9 | Bristol Rovers | 42 | 19 | 7 | 16 | 75 | 70 | 1.071 | 45 | |
| 10 | Swansea Town | 42 | 17 | 9 | 16 | 86 | 83 | 1.036 | 43 | |
| 11 | Liverpool | 42 | 16 | 10 | 16 | 92 | 96 | 0.958 | 42 | |
| 12 | Middlesbrough | 42 | 18 | 6 | 18 | 73 | 82 | 0.890 | 42 | |
| 13 | Bury | 42 | 15 | 11 | 16 | 77 | 72 | 1.069 | 41 | |
| 14 | Fulham | 42 | 14 | 11 | 17 | 76 | 79 | 0.962 | 39 | |
| 15 | Nottingham Forest | 42 | 16 | 7 | 19 | 58 | 62 | 0.935 | 39 | |
| 16 | Lincoln City | 42 | 13 | 10 | 19 | 68 | 79 | 0.861 | 36 | |
| 17 | Port Vale | 42 | 12 | 11 | 19 | 48 | 71 | 0.676 | 35 | |
| 18 | Doncaster Rovers | 42 | 14 | 7 | 21 | 58 | 95 | 0.611 | 35 | |
| 19 | Hull City | 42 | 12 | 10 | 20 | 44 | 69 | 0.638 | 34 | |
| 20 | Plymouth Argyle | 42 | 12 | 7 | 23 | 57 | 82 | 0.695 | 31 | |
| 21 | Ipswich Town (R) | 42 | 11 | 6 | 25 | 57 | 92 | 0.620 | 28 | Relegation to the Third Division South |
| 22 | Derby County (R) | 42 | 7 | 9 | 26 | 53 | 82 | 0.646 | 23 | Relegation to the Third Division North |

Rules for classification: 1) Points; 2) Goal average; 3) Goals scored
(C) Champions; (P) Promoted; (R) Relegated

=== Results ===
| Home \ Away | BIR | BLB | BRR | BRY | DER | DON | FUL | HUL | IPS | LEE | LIN | LIV | LUT | MID | NOT | NTC | PLY | PTV | ROT | STK | SWA | WHU |
|---|---|---|---|---|---|---|---|---|---|---|---|---|---|---|---|---|---|---|---|---|---|---|
| Birmingham | | 3–1 | 2–1 | 1–3 | 1–1 | 4–1 | 3–2 | 0–0 | 4–0 | 2–0 | 3–3 | 9–1 | 2–1 | 3–0 | 0–1 | 1–1 | 3–1 | 7–2 | 3–1 | 2–0 | 2–0 | 1–2 |
| Blackburn Rovers | 3–3 | | 8–3 | 1–1 | 5–2 | 7–2 | 3–1 | 4–0 | 4–1 | 1–2 | 1–0 | 4–3 | 0–0 | 9–0 | 0–1 | 4–5 | 2–2 | 2–1 | 4–1 | 2–0 | 4–1 | 5–2 |
| Bristol Rovers | 1–1 | 2–1 | | 2–1 | 4–1 | 1–0 | 4–1 | 1–0 | 4–0 | 5–1 | 2–2 | 3–0 | 3–2 | 2–2 | 2–1 | 1–4 | 3–1 | 1–0 | 1–0 | 1–1 | 7–0 | 2–4 |
| Bury | 0–1 | 2–1 | 3–1 | | 2–2 | 1–4 | 1–3 | 4–1 | 2–1 | 5–3 | 3–1 | 3–4 | 2–1 | 0–1 | 1–1 | 1–2 | 3–1 | 2–2 | 2–2 | 1–1 | 2–1 | 4–1 |
| Derby County | 0–0 | 0–3 | 1–1 | 2–3 | | 5–0 | 3–4 | 3–0 | 2–0 | 2–4 | 3–0 | 3–2 | 0–0 | 1–2 | 1–2 | 1–1 | 2–2 | 6–1 | 2–3 | 1–2 | 1–4 | 0–0 |
| Doncaster Rovers | 1–5 | 1–3 | 2–2 | 1–0 | 2–0 | | 4–0 | 2–2 | 1–1 | 0–1 | 1–1 | 4–1 | 0–3 | 3–1 | 0–3 | 4–2 | 3–2 | 1–0 | 0–4 | 1–1 | 2–1 | 2–1 |
| Fulham | 2–1 | 5–1 | 2–3 | 0–0 | 2–0 | 5–2 | | 0–1 | 4–1 | 1–3 | 3–2 | 1–2 | 3–1 | 1–2 | 1–1 | 3–1 | 2–3 | 3–1 | 1–1 | 2–2 | 5–1 | 0–0 |
| Hull City | 0–3 | 1–4 | 0–1 | 1–0 | 1–1 | 1–1 | 0–0 | | 4–2 | 0–2 | 4–0 | 2–2 | 0–4 | 1–0 | 2–3 | 5–2 | 0–2 | 2–1 | 1–2 | 1–1 | 4–3 | 0–1 |
| Ipswich Town | 1–2 | 1–1 | 1–0 | 2–3 | 2–1 | 5–1 | 2–4 | 2–0 | | 1–2 | 1–2 | 2–0 | 3–1 | 6–1 | 2–1 | 0–1 | 2–1 | 1–0 | 2–2 | 0–1 | 1–1 | 0–3 |
| Leeds United | 1–0 | 2–0 | 2–0 | 1–0 | 1–0 | 1–0 | 1–1 | 3–0 | 4–1 | | 2–3 | 2–2 | 4–0 | 1–1 | 1–1 | 2–0 | 3–2 | 3–0 | 2–4 | 0–1 | 5–2 | 2–1 |
| Lincoln City | 1–1 | 2–1 | 0–2 | 3–2 | 3–0 | 5–1 | 2–2 | 0–1 | 1–1 | 2–0 | | 3–3 | 1–2 | 3–3 | 2–1 | 1–2 | 3–2 | 0–1 | 2–3 | 1–4 | 2–2 | 2–1 |
| Liverpool | 2–2 | 4–1 | 5–3 | 1–1 | 2–0 | 3–2 | 4–1 | 2–1 | 6–2 | 2–2 | 2–4 | | 4–4 | 3–1 | 1–0 | 3–1 | 3–3 | 1–1 | 3–1 | 2–4 | 1–1 | 1–2 |
| Luton Town | 1–0 | 7–3 | 2–0 | 3–2 | 2–0 | 3–0 | 3–0 | 1–1 | 3–2 | 0–0 | 2–1 | 3–2 | | 2–0 | 3–0 | 3–1 | 3–1 | 4–2 | 4–0 | 3–1 | 1–2 | 2–0 |
| Middlesbrough | 2–5 | 4–3 | 1–0 | 1–1 | 3–1 | 3–1 | 4–2 | 1–2 | 0–1 | 1–0 | 2–1 | 1–2 | 0–2 | | 1–4 | 2–0 | 4–1 | 2–0 | 5–1 | 1–2 | 4–2 | 6–0 |
| Nottingham Forest | 0–2 | 1–2 | 1–0 | 2–3 | 3–0 | 3–1 | 2–0 | 0–1 | 2–0 | 1–1 | 1–1 | 3–1 | 1–5 | 4–2 | | 0–1 | 2–0 | 2–3 | 0–2 | 0–3 | 0–0 | 1–1 |
| Notts County | 3–2 | 3–1 | 2–0 | 2–1 | 2–3 | 4–0 | 0–0 | 3–1 | 2–1 | 1–2 | 2–1 | 0–3 | 3–3 | 1–3 | 4–1 | | 2–0 | 1–1 | 3–2 | 1–0 | 2–1 | 5–1 |
| Plymouth Argyle | 1–0 | 0–2 | 0–1 | 2–4 | 1–0 | 1–2 | 3–2 | 1–2 | 2–0 | 3–1 | 1–0 | 1–0 | 2–1 | 2–2 | 1–2 | 1–3 | | 0–0 | 2–1 | 2–0 | 2–2 | 1–1 |
| Port Vale | 2–0 | 0–3 | 1–0 | 1–0 | 3–0 | 1–1 | 4–0 | 3–0 | 3–3 | 0–1 | 1–3 | 4–3 | 1–1 | 1–1 | 1–2 | 1–1 | 1–0 | | 1–0 | 0–1 | 1–0 | 1–1 |
| Rotherham United | 0–2 | 5–1 | 6–2 | 4–2 | 2–1 | 2–3 | 2–3 | 2–0 | 3–2 | 3–0 | 3–0 | 6–1 | 2–0 | 3–0 | 3–2 | 2–0 | 2–0 | 3–0 | | 2–1 | 2–0 | 2–2 |
| Stoke City | 2–1 | 1–1 | 2–0 | 3–2 | 3–1 | 3–0 | 1–1 | 0–0 | 3–0 | 0–1 | 4–2 | 2–0 | 0–0 | 1–2 | 2–0 | 3–0 | 3–1 | 0–0 | 1–2 | | 4–1 | 0–2 |
| Swansea Town | 0–3 | 2–3 | 1–1 | 1–1 | 3–0 | 3–0 | 2–2 | 1–0 | 6–1 | 2–0 | 3–1 | 3–2 | 2–1 | 2–0 | 3–2 | 3–0 | 4–2 | 7–1 | 2–1 | 3–5 | | 5–2 |
| West Ham United | 2–2 | 2–5 | 5–2 | 3–3 | 1–0 | 0–1 | 2–1 | 1–1 | 4–0 | 2–1 | 0–1 | 0–3 | 2–1 | 2–1 | 2–0 | 3–0 | 6–1 | 2–0 | 1–2 | 3–0 | 3–3 | |

Updated to match(es) played on unknown. Source: Ian Laschke: Rothmans Book of Football League Records 1888–89 to 1978–79. Macdonald and Jane’s, London & Sydney, 1980.
Legend: Blue = home team win; Yellow = draw; Red = away team win.

=== Maps ===
Locations of the Football League Second Division London teams 1954–1955
Locations of the Football League Second Division 1954–1955 teams

== Third Division North ==
Football League Third Division North
- Season: 1954–55
- Champions: Barnsley (3rd title)
- Failed re-election: None
- Matches: 552
- Goals: 1,627 (2.95 per match)
- Top goalscorer: Don Travis (Oldham Athletic), Jack Connor (Stockport County), Arthur Bottom (York City), 30

| Pos | Team | Pld | W | D | L | GF | GA | GAv | Pts | Promotion or relegation |
|---|---|---|---|---|---|---|---|---|---|---|
| 1 | Barnsley (C, P) | 46 | 30 | 5 | 11 | 86 | 46 | 1.870 | 65 | Promotion to the Second Division |
| 2 | Accrington Stanley | 46 | 25 | 11 | 10 | 96 | 67 | 1.433 | 61 | |
| 3 | Scunthorpe & Lindsey United | 46 | 23 | 12 | 11 | 81 | 53 | 1.528 | 58 | |
| 4 | York City | 46 | 24 | 10 | 12 | 92 | 63 | 1.460 | 58 | |
| 5 | Hartlepools United | 46 | 25 | 5 | 16 | 64 | 49 | 1.306 | 55 | |
| 6 | Chesterfield | 46 | 24 | 6 | 16 | 81 | 70 | 1.157 | 54 | |
| 7 | Gateshead | 46 | 20 | 12 | 14 | 65 | 69 | 0.942 | 52 | |
| 8 | Workington | 46 | 18 | 14 | 14 | 68 | 55 | 1.236 | 50 | |
| 9 | Stockport County | 46 | 18 | 12 | 16 | 84 | 70 | 1.200 | 48 | |
| 10 | Oldham Athletic | 46 | 19 | 10 | 17 | 74 | 68 | 1.088 | 48 | |
| 11 | Southport | 46 | 16 | 16 | 14 | 47 | 44 | 1.068 | 48 | |
| 12 | Rochdale | 46 | 17 | 14 | 15 | 69 | 66 | 1.045 | 48 | |
| 13 | Mansfield Town | 46 | 18 | 9 | 19 | 65 | 71 | 0.915 | 45 | |
| 14 | Halifax Town | 46 | 15 | 13 | 18 | 63 | 67 | 0.940 | 43 | |
| 15 | Darlington | 46 | 14 | 14 | 18 | 62 | 73 | 0.849 | 42 | |
| 16 | Bradford (Park Avenue) | 46 | 15 | 11 | 20 | 56 | 70 | 0.800 | 41 | |
| 17 | Barrow | 46 | 17 | 6 | 23 | 70 | 89 | 0.787 | 40 | |
| 18 | Wrexham | 46 | 13 | 12 | 21 | 65 | 77 | 0.844 | 38 | |
| 19 | Tranmere Rovers | 46 | 13 | 11 | 22 | 55 | 70 | 0.786 | 37 | |
| 20 | Carlisle United | 46 | 15 | 6 | 25 | 78 | 89 | 0.876 | 36 | |
| 21 | Bradford City | 46 | 13 | 10 | 23 | 47 | 55 | 0.855 | 36 | |
| 22 | Crewe Alexandra | 46 | 10 | 14 | 22 | 68 | 91 | 0.747 | 34 | |
| 23 | Grimsby Town | 46 | 13 | 8 | 25 | 47 | 78 | 0.603 | 34 | Re-elected |
| 24 | Chester | 46 | 12 | 9 | 25 | 44 | 77 | 0.571 | 33 | Re-elected |

Source: rsssf.com
(C) Champions; (P) Promoted

=== Results ===
| Home \ Away | ACC | BAR | BRW | BRA | BPA | CRL | CHE | CHF | CRE | DAR | GAT | GRI | HAL | HAR | MAN | OLD | ROC | SCU | SOU | STP | TRA | WRK | WRE | YOR |
|---|---|---|---|---|---|---|---|---|---|---|---|---|---|---|---|---|---|---|---|---|---|---|---|---|
| Accrington Stanley | | 2–3 | 6–3 | 1–0 | 4–3 | 3–2 | 3–0 | 4–1 | 1–0 | 3–0 | 6–2 | 3–0 | 3–1 | 2–5 | 3–2 | 4–0 | 5–4 | 2–1 | 1–1 | 0–1 | 3–1 | 2–0 | 2–0 | 2–2 |
| Barnsley | 1–2 | | 3–0 | 1–0 | 2–1 | 3–1 | 4–2 | 3–0 | 3–1 | 4–1 | 3–0 | 1–3 | 3–0 | 0–0 | 1–0 | 2–2 | 2–0 | 1–0 | 0–0 | 2–0 | 4–1 | 3–1 | 4–2 | 1–0 |
| Barrow | 1–2 | 3–1 | | 3–2 | 3–1 | 2–1 | 2–0 | 2–0 | 0–3 | 1–1 | 0–1 | 2–0 | 1–3 | 0–2 | 2–2 | 3–1 | 4–2 | 1–3 | 2–1 | 2–0 | 1–0 | 2–2 | 1–1 | 1–5 |
| Bradford City | 0–3 | 0–2 | 2–1 | | 1–1 | 2–0 | 0–0 | 1–1 | 2–0 | 3–0 | 1–1 | 4–0 | 2–0 | 0–1 | 1–0 | 0–1 | 1–0 | 2–4 | 0–1 | 2–3 | 2–1 | 0–1 | 2–2 | 2–3 |
| Bradford Park Avenue | 3–2 | 1–0 | 3–0 | 2–0 | | 0–2 | 3–0 | 1–3 | 2–1 | 1–1 | 2–2 | 2–1 | 0–1 | 1–0 | 0–0 | 0–2 | 1–1 | 0–0 | 1–0 | 2–1 | 0–0 | 3–1 | 0–0 | 1–3 |
| Carlisle United | 1–0 | 2–4 | 4–0 | 1–0 | 3–2 | | 1–2 | 1–2 | 4–0 | 0–1 | 1–2 | 3–1 | 4–0 | 3–2 | 1–2 | 5–2 | 7–2 | 1–2 | 2–1 | 3–3 | 1–2 | 0–4 | 1–0 | 4–5 |
| Chester | 1–1 | 0–2 | 3–1 | 1–0 | 2–0 | 1–2 | | 1–0 | 3–1 | 0–2 | 1–2 | 1–0 | 1–3 | 1–0 | 1–0 | 0–0 | 1–2 | 2–4 | 0–0 | 1–0 | 0–1 | 0–2 | 1–0 | 1–2 |
| Chesterfield | 6–1 | 3–1 | 4–1 | 2–1 | 1–3 | 2–1 | 5–3 | | 0–0 | 2–0 | 1–3 | 1–0 | 2–1 | 3–0 | 4–1 | 1–3 | 3–1 | 2–0 | 2–1 | 3–7 | 2–1 | 2–0 | 3–1 | 0–3 |
| Crewe Alexandra | 0–3 | 1–2 | 5–1 | 1–0 | 2–1 | 4–1 | 1–3 | 2–2 | | 2–2 | 1–1 | 2–0 | 0–0 | 1–1 | 2–1 | 4–1 | 2–2 | 1–1 | 2–3 | 4–4 | 3–0 | 1–1 | 2–2 | 2–3 |
| Darlington | 3–3 | 0–1 | 3–2 | 4–0 | 3–0 | 1–1 | 4–1 | 0–2 | 2–1 | | 5–1 | 1–3 | 1–0 | 0–1 | 3–1 | 0–2 | 2–2 | 1–1 | 2–0 | 0–0 | 2–2 | 1–2 | 2–2 | 1–0 |
| Gateshead | 1–1 | 0–4 | 3–1 | 2–1 | 3–2 | 0–0 | 0–0 | 1–3 | 1–0 | 1–1 | | 1–0 | 4–0 | 3–0 | 4–0 | 2–2 | 0–1 | 0–1 | 1–0 | 4–4 | 3–1 | 3–2 | 0–1 | 1–1 |
| Grimsby Town | 2–1 | 1–3 | 1–0 | 1–4 | 1–0 | 2–0 | 3–1 | 1–2 | 2–1 | 0–2 | 1–1 | | 0–1 | 1–0 | 3–2 | 1–1 | 1–1 | 1–4 | 0–1 | 1–0 | 2–2 | 0–1 | 1–3 | 2–1 |
| Halifax Town | 1–1 | 1–1 | 1–2 | 0–0 | 0–0 | 5–3 | 3–1 | 2–0 | 3–3 | 4–1 | 4–0 | 3–2 | | 1–0 | 1–2 | 0–0 | 1–2 | 3–1 | 0–1 | 1–2 | 0–0 | 2–2 | 2–0 | 3–3 |
| Hartlepool | 1–3 | 0–3 | 0–0 | 0–0 | 0–1 | 1–0 | 3–1 | 2–0 | 2–1 | 1–0 | 0–0 | 3–2 | 1–0 | | 1–2 | 2–0 | 3–1 | 4–2 | 2–1 | 2–1 | 4–0 | 3–2 | 3–0 | 1–0 |
| Mansfield Town | 2–2 | 1–1 | 0–5 | 1–0 | 2–1 | 1–1 | 2–1 | 2–0 | 4–2 | 3–1 | 0–1 | 3–0 | 2–1 | 0–2 | | 1–3 | 3–2 | 2–1 | 3–0 | 0–0 | 3–1 | 2–0 | 2–1 | 1–2 |
| Oldham Athletic | 0–1 | 4–1 | 3–2 | 1–1 | 5–0 | 2–1 | 2–1 | 4–1 | 4–0 | 3–1 | 1–2 | 4–0 | 1–2 | 0–1 | 1–1 | | 0–0 | 1–1 | 1–0 | 1–1 | 2–1 | 2–1 | 2–1 | 3–2 |
| Rochdale | 0–0 | 3–0 | 4–1 | 1–2 | 3–2 | 1–2 | 2–0 | 0–0 | 1–1 | 2–2 | 4–0 | 0–3 | 2–2 | 2–1 | 2–0 | 2–1 | | 2–0 | 0–0 | 1–0 | 2–0 | 2–1 | 2–1 | 1–1 |
| Scunthorpe & Lindsey United | 4–0 | 1–0 | 3–0 | 1–0 | 1–1 | 1–1 | 1–1 | 2–1 | 3–1 | 1–0 | 0–2 | 1–0 | 2–2 | 5–1 | 2–0 | 6–1 | 2–2 | | 2–0 | 3–0 | 1–2 | 1–1 | 1–0 | 1–2 |
| Southport | 1–1 | 0–2 | 2–1 | 1–0 | 1–0 | 4–1 | 1–1 | 0–0 | 1–0 | 0–0 | 1–2 | 2–2 | 4–0 | 1–0 | 1–0 | 1–0 | 1–0 | 1–1 | | 1–1 | 0–0 | 1–2 | 1–2 | 2–2 |
| Stockport County | 0–0 | 1–0 | 1–2 | 1–1 | 6–0 | 5–2 | 3–0 | 3–2 | 6–1 | 3–0 | 2–1 | 0–0 | 2–1 | 0–2 | 2–2 | 3–2 | 1–4 | 4–2 | 0–2 | | 2–0 | 0–1 | 4–0 | 1–2 |
| Tranmere | 3–1 | 0–1 | 0–4 | 2–0 | 3–3 | 6–1 | 1–1 | 0–0 | 1–2 | 0–1 | 1–2 | 2–0 | 1–2 | 3–1 | 2–1 | 2–1 | 3–1 | 1–2 | 2–2 | 1–1 | | 1–1 | 1–2 | 1–0 |
| Workington | 0–1 | 1–0 | 0–0 | 1–1 | 1–3 | 1–0 | 1–1 | 2–3 | 3–3 | 6–1 | 4–0 | 2–2 | 1–0 | 0–1 | 2–2 | 3–0 | 1–0 | 1–1 | 0–1 | 4–1 | 1–0 | | 2–1 | 2–1 |
| Wrexham | 3–1 | 3–0 | 3–0 | 1–3 | 1–0 | 1–1 | 2–1 | 0–2 | 5–0 | 2–2 | 2–0 | 5–0 | 1–1 | 1–4 | 1–3 | 2–1 | 0–0 | 0–1 | 2–2 | 1–4 | 1–2 | 1–1 | | 2–6 |
| York City | 1–1 | 1–3 | 1–4 | 0–1 | 1–2 | 2–1 | 5–0 | 3–2 | 3–1 | 3–1 | 2–1 | 0–0 | 2–1 | 1–0 | 3–1 | 2–1 | 2–0 | 2–3 | 1–1 | 4–0 | 1–0 | 0–0 | 3–3 | |

Updated to match(es) played on unknown. Source: Ian Laschke: Rothmans Book of Football League Records 1888–89 to 1978–79. Macdonald and Jane’s, London & Sydney, 1980.
Legend: Blue = home team win; Yellow = draw; Red = away team win.

=== Maps ===
Locations of the Football League Third Division North teams 1954–1955

== Third Division South ==
Football League Third Division South
- Season: 1954–55
- Champions: Bristol City (3rd title)
- Failed re-election: None
- Matches: 552
- Goals: 1,677 (3.04 per match)
- Top goalscorer: Ernie Morgan (Gillingham), 31

| Pos | Team | Pld | W | D | L | GF | GA | GAv | Pts | Promotion or relegation |
|---|---|---|---|---|---|---|---|---|---|---|
| 1 | Bristol City (C, P) | 46 | 30 | 10 | 6 | 101 | 47 | 2.149 | 70 | Promotion to the Second Division |
| 2 | Leyton Orient | 46 | 26 | 9 | 11 | 89 | 47 | 1.894 | 61 | |
| 3 | Southampton | 46 | 24 | 11 | 11 | 75 | 51 | 1.471 | 59 | |
| 4 | Gillingham | 46 | 20 | 15 | 11 | 77 | 66 | 1.167 | 55 | |
| 5 | Millwall | 46 | 20 | 11 | 15 | 72 | 68 | 1.059 | 51 | |
| 6 | Brighton & Hove Albion | 46 | 20 | 10 | 16 | 76 | 63 | 1.206 | 50 | |
| 7 | Watford | 46 | 18 | 14 | 14 | 71 | 62 | 1.145 | 50 | |
| 8 | Torquay United | 46 | 18 | 12 | 16 | 82 | 82 | 1.000 | 48 | |
| 9 | Coventry City | 46 | 18 | 11 | 17 | 67 | 59 | 1.136 | 47 | |
| 10 | Southend United | 46 | 17 | 12 | 17 | 83 | 80 | 1.038 | 46 | |
| 11 | Brentford | 46 | 16 | 14 | 16 | 82 | 82 | 1.000 | 46 | |
| 12 | Norwich City | 46 | 18 | 10 | 18 | 60 | 60 | 1.000 | 46 | |
| 13 | Northampton Town | 46 | 19 | 8 | 19 | 73 | 81 | 0.901 | 46 | |
| 14 | Aldershot | 46 | 16 | 13 | 17 | 75 | 71 | 1.056 | 45 | |
| 15 | Queens Park Rangers | 46 | 15 | 14 | 17 | 69 | 75 | 0.920 | 44 | |
| 16 | Shrewsbury Town | 46 | 16 | 10 | 20 | 70 | 78 | 0.897 | 42 | |
| 17 | Bournemouth & Boscombe Athletic | 46 | 12 | 18 | 16 | 57 | 65 | 0.877 | 42 | |
| 18 | Reading | 46 | 13 | 15 | 18 | 65 | 73 | 0.890 | 41 | |
| 19 | Newport County | 46 | 11 | 16 | 19 | 60 | 73 | 0.822 | 38 | |
| 20 | Crystal Palace | 46 | 11 | 16 | 19 | 52 | 80 | 0.650 | 38 | |
| 21 | Swindon Town | 46 | 11 | 15 | 20 | 46 | 64 | 0.719 | 37 | |
| 22 | Exeter City | 46 | 11 | 15 | 20 | 47 | 73 | 0.644 | 37 | |
| 23 | Walsall | 46 | 10 | 14 | 22 | 75 | 86 | 0.872 | 34 | Re-elected |
| 24 | Colchester United | 46 | 9 | 13 | 24 | 53 | 91 | 0.582 | 31 | Re-elected |

Source: rsssf.com
(C) Champions; (P) Promoted

=== Results ===
| Home \ Away | ALD | B&BA | BRE | B&HA | BRI | COL | COV | CRY | EXE | GIL | LEY | MIL | NPC | NOR | NWC | QPR | REA | SHR | SOU | STD | SWI | TOR | WAL | WAT |
|---|---|---|---|---|---|---|---|---|---|---|---|---|---|---|---|---|---|---|---|---|---|---|---|---|
| Aldershot | | 1–1 | 2–3 | 2–2 | 0–2 | 2–2 | 1–1 | 3–0 | 4–2 | 0–2 | 0–1 | 3–0 | 0–0 | 3–4 | 4–1 | 2–0 | 3–1 | 2–0 | 2–0 | 1–0 | 0–0 | 2–1 | 4–0 | 3–0 |
| Bournemouth & Boscombe Athletic | 4–0 | | 1–2 | 1–1 | 0–1 | 2–0 | 2–1 | 4–1 | 2–0 | 1–2 | 0–3 | 0–1 | 3–3 | 0–1 | 1–3 | 2–2 | 0–0 | 3–1 | 1–1 | 2–1 | 1–1 | 0–2 | 1–1 | 1–1 |
| Brentford | 1–1 | 1–3 | | 2–3 | 2–2 | 3–2 | 2–3 | 3–0 | 1–0 | 3–0 | 2–0 | 3–1 | 1–0 | 1–3 | 1–0 | 1–1 | 2–2 | 2–2 | 0–3 | 2–2 | 4–2 | 4–2 | 0–2 | 3–2 |
| Brighton & Hove Albion | 5–3 | 1–1 | 3–4 | | 0–1 | 1–1 | 2–0 | 1–0 | 5–3 | 1–0 | 1–0 | 1–2 | 4–1 | 2–1 | 0–1 | 4–1 | 3–2 | 0–0 | 1–2 | 2–1 | 3–1 | 1–1 | 3–0 | 3–1 |
| Bristol City | 6–1 | 2–2 | 2–1 | 3–2 | | 4–0 | 2–0 | 3–0 | 2–0 | 1–4 | 5–0 | 5–1 | 0–0 | 5–1 | 0–1 | 1–1 | 2–1 | 4–1 | 2–0 | 3–2 | 3–0 | 1–1 | 5–3 | 1–0 |
| Colchester United | 1–1 | 3–3 | 3–2 | 2–4 | 0–2 | | 0–1 | 2–0 | 1–2 | 2–2 | 2–2 | 0–2 | 1–0 | 4–1 | 1–0 | 1–0 | 0–2 | 2–4 | 3–5 | 2–0 | 0–0 | 0–2 | 2–2 | 1–3 |
| Coventry City | 2–1 | 1–0 | 1–0 | 2–1 | 1–3 | 0–0 | | 4–1 | 1–1 | 4–1 | 2–2 | 4–1 | 3–2 | 0–0 | 4–0 | 5–1 | 2–1 | 3–0 | 1–1 | 1–4 | 1–0 | 0–1 | 5–3 | 3–2 |
| Crystal Palace | 3–2 | 2–1 | 1–1 | 1–0 | 1–2 | 0–0 | 1–0 | | 1–1 | 0–2 | 1–1 | 1–1 | 2–1 | 3–1 | 2–0 | 2–1 | 1–1 | 2–2 | 1–2 | 2–2 | 0–0 | 1–1 | 3–1 | 1–1 |
| Exeter City | 0–1 | 1–1 | 3–2 | 3–1 | 0–1 | 2–2 | 0–0 | 2–0 | | 1–1 | 1–7 | 1–4 | 1–1 | 3–1 | 0–1 | 2–1 | 3–1 | 1–0 | 0–1 | 2–1 | 2–1 | 1–2 | 1–1 | 0–0 |
| Gillingham | 0–2 | 0–2 | 2–1 | 1–1 | 1–1 | 2–1 | 2–1 | 2–1 | 1–1 | | 0–0 | 1–1 | 4–2 | 2–2 | 2–1 | 3–1 | 5–1 | 3–3 | 1–0 | 1–1 | 2–1 | 3–1 | 3–2 | 0–1 |
| Leyton Orient | 1–5 | 3–1 | 0–1 | 0–0 | 4–1 | 2–0 | 1–0 | 2–1 | 5–0 | 2–2 | | 1–0 | 1–2 | 2–1 | 1–2 | 3–0 | 2–0 | 5–0 | 4–1 | 5–1 | 1–0 | 2–1 | 1–0 | 0–1 |
| Millwall | 3–1 | 1–1 | 2–2 | 2–0 | 1–3 | 5–2 | 3–1 | 5–2 | 2–2 | 3–2 | 1–0 | | 1–1 | 1–0 | 0–0 | 0–1 | 2–2 | 2–0 | 2–0 | 1–4 | 1–0 | 4–1 | 1–0 | 1–0 |
| Newport County | 2–1 | 1–1 | 3–1 | 1–3 | 2–2 | 0–0 | 1–1 | 0–1 | 2–1 | 1–3 | 1–2 | 2–1 | | 0–1 | 1–1 | 4–0 | 3–1 | 1–1 | 0–1 | 3–2 | 2–2 | 1–1 | 1–0 | 0–2 |
| Northampton Town | 2–1 | 5–0 | 1–2 | 1–0 | 2–0 | 6–1 | 1–0 | 1–1 | 2–0 | 4–1 | 2–2 | 0–1 | 2–2 | | 1–1 | 1–3 | 2–6 | 3–1 | 2–1 | 6–2 | 1–0 | 1–0 | 1–1 | 0–1 |
| Norwich City | 4–3 | 0–1 | 1–0 | 0–0 | 0–1 | 0–2 | 1–1 | 2–0 | 3–0 | 1–2 | 1–1 | 2–1 | 2–0 | 3–2 | | 1–1 | 0–1 | 2–0 | 2–0 | 3–3 | 2–1 | 5–1 | 2–1 | 3–1 |
| Queens Park Rangers | 5–0 | 1–1 | 1–1 | 3–2 | 1–1 | 4–1 | 3–2 | 1–0 | 1–2 | 1–1 | 2–0 | 1–2 | 2–0 | 1–0 | 2–1 | | 2–3 | 2–0 | 2–2 | 1–1 | 3–1 | 4–2 | 1–1 | 2–1 |
| Reading | 2–2 | 1–0 | 0–0 | 0–2 | 0–2 | 4–0 | 2–2 | 5–0 | 0–0 | 2–2 | 0–2 | 0–0 | 2–1 | 0–1 | 1–1 | 3–1 | | 1–2 | 0–1 | 1–1 | 2–1 | 3–2 | 2–2 | 1–1 |
| Shrewsbury Town | 1–0 | 3–0 | 2–2 | 3–0 | 0–2 | 2–0 | 1–0 | 1–1 | 1–1 | 1–1 | 0–2 | 3–2 | 3–0 | 4–0 | 2–1 | 1–0 | 2–3 | | 3–1 | 2–3 | 7–0 | 3–2 | 2–2 | 2–1 |
| Southampton | 1–1 | 0–0 | 6–4 | 3–2 | 2–1 | 0–1 | 1–0 | 2–2 | 3–0 | 3–1 | 1–0 | 3–0 | 2–0 | 4–0 | 3–1 | 2–2 | 3–1 | 2–1 | | 3–0 | 1–1 | 0–0 | 2–1 | 2–0 |
| Southend | 0–1 | 2–2 | 3–2 | 4–0 | 3–2 | 4–2 | 1–0 | 3–2 | 0–0 | 3–1 | 1–2 | 1–0 | 1–1 | 4–1 | 4–1 | 2–2 | 0–0 | 4–1 | 0–1 | | 4–1 | 1–2 | 2–1 | 1–3 |
| Swindon Town | 1–0 | 0–2 | 1–1 | 0–2 | 2–2 | 1–1 | 3–0 | 0–0 | 2–0 | 2–1 | 0–0 | 1–1 | 1–3 | 0–1 | 1–0 | 2–0 | 2–0 | 2–1 | 1–0 | 0–1 | | 0–0 | 2–2 | 6–1 |
| Torquay United | 2–2 | 0–1 | 4–2 | 2–1 | 2–2 | 2–1 | 1–2 | 2–2 | 1–0 | 1–3 | 2–7 | 4–2 | 2–3 | 5–2 | 2–0 | 3–2 | 3–1 | 2–0 | 2–2 | 4–1 | 1–1 | | 2–0 | 2–2 |
| Walsall | 2–2 | 6–1 | 2–2 | 0–2 | 1–3 | 3–1 | 1–1 | 1–4 | 1–0 | 0–1 | 1–4 | 1–1 | 3–3 | 6–1 | 2–1 | 4–1 | 4–0 | 4–0 | 0–0 | 4–1 | 1–2 | 2–4 | | 0–1 |
| Watford | 0–0 | 1–0 | 2–2 | 0–0 | 0–2 | 2–0 | 1–0 | 7–1 | 1–1 | 1–1 | 1–3 | 5–3 | 3–2 | 1–1 | 2–2 | 1–1 | 1–3 | 2–1 | 2–1 | 1–1 | 3–0 | 4–1 | 4–0 | |

Updated to match(es) played on unknown. Source: Ian Laschke: Rothmans Book of Football League Records 1888–89 to 1978–79. Macdonald and Jane’s, London & Sydney, 1980.
Legend: Blue = home team win; Yellow = draw; Red = away team win.

=== Maps ===
Locations of the Football League Third Division South London teams 1954–1955
Locations of the Football League Third Division South teams 1954–1955

== Attendances ==
=== Division One ===
| No. | Club | Average |
|---|---|---|
| 1 | Chelsea FC | 48,260 |
| 2 | Everton FC | 46,394 |
| 3 | Arsenal FC | 43,725 |
| 4 | Sunderland AFC | 43,043 |
| 5 | Newcastle United FC | 42,925 |
| 6 | Tottenham Hotspur FC | 37,248 |
| 7 | Wolverhampton Wanderers FC | 36,477 |
| 8 | Manchester United | 35,960 |
| 9 | Manchester City FC | 35,217 |
| 10 | West Bromwich Albion FC | 31,098 |
| 11 | Leicester City FC | 31,067 |
| 12 | Portsmouth FC | 29,868 |
| 13 | Aston Villa FC | 29,578 |
| 14 | Bolton Wanderers FC | 28,370 |
| 15 | Preston North End FC | 26,625 |
| 16 | Sheffield Wednesday FC | 26,141 |
| 17 | Burnley FC | 25,094 |
| 18 | Huddersfield Town AFC | 24,974 |
| 19 | Cardiff City FC | 24,311 |
| 20 | Charlton Athletic FC | 24,005 |
| 21 | Blackpool FC | 23,959 |
| 22 | Sheffield United FC | 23,880 |

=== Division Two ===
| No. | Club | Average |
|---|---|---|
| 1 | Liverpool FC | 36,214 |
| 2 | Blackburn Rovers FC | 26,928 |
| 3 | Bristol Rovers FC | 23,116 |
| 4 | Fulham FC | 21,566 |
| 5 | Leeds United FC | 21,387 |
| 6 | Stoke City FC | 21,131 |
| 7 | Middlesbrough FC | 21,118 |
| 8 | Swansea City AFC | 21,052 |
| 9 | Birmingham City FC | 20,973 |
| 10 | Port Vale FC | 20,869 |
| 11 | West Ham United FC | 20,299 |
| 12 | Hull City AFC | 20,285 |
| 13 | Plymouth Argyle FC | 19,422 |
| 14 | Luton Town FC | 17,311 |
| 15 | Notts County FC | 16,895 |
| 16 | Rotherham United FC | 16,353 |
| 17 | Ipswich Town FC | 15,390 |
| 18 | Derby County FC | 14,966 |
| 19 | Nottingham Forest FC | 14,617 |
| 20 | Bury FC | 14,174 |
| 21 | Doncaster Rovers FC | 12,385 |
| 22 | Lincoln City FC | 12,067 |

== See also ==
- 1954-55 in English football
