= Derek Saunders =

English footballer (1928–2018)

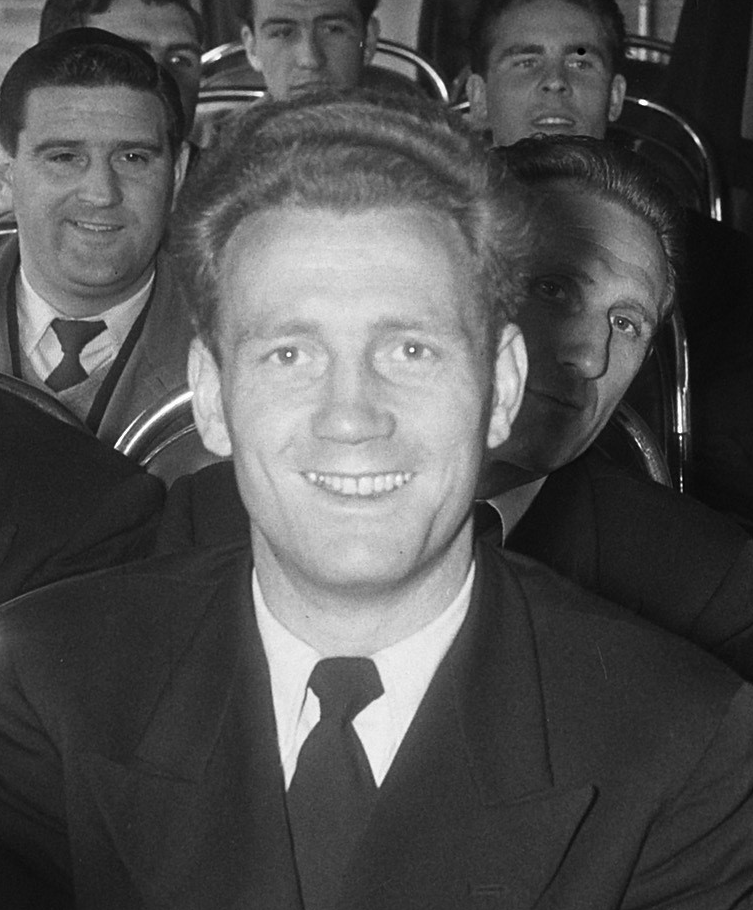
- Saunders in 1955

Personal information
- Date of birth: 6 January 1928
- Place of birth: Ware, England
- Date of death: 3 March 2018 (aged 90)
- Position: Half-back

Senior career*
Years	Team	Apps	(Gls)
1953–1959	Chelsea	203	(9)
- * Club domestic league appearances and goals

Derek Saunders (6 January 1928 – 3 March 2018) was an English footballer who played for Chelsea during the 1950s.

== Biography ==
Born in Ware, for whose Spartan League side he made 31 appearances in 1945–46 as its youngest ever captain, Saunders played in a number of positions. He matured into a wing-half and furthered his career with amateur side Walthamstow Avenue, who he captained in their 1952 FA Amateur Cup Final win. He joined Chelsea in June 1953 and immediately turned professional, making his club debut against Sheffield United.

Saunders was a member of Chelsea's 1954–55 Championship-winning team. He was one of only two players to play in every game that season. Saunders' position meant that he rarely scored goals, but he scored a crucial one against West Bromwich Albion to put Chelsea 3-2 ahead after they had trailed 0–2; they eventually won 4–2. He stayed with Chelsea for a further four seasons, though they were unable to repeat their title success. He featured in the first Chelsea side to play in a European competition, the Inter-Cities Fairs Cup in 1958. A year earlier, he had played for the representative London XI side in the same competition. He made 223 appearances for Chelsea, and scored nine goals. Upon leaving the club in 1959, Saunders became the Head Groundsman at Vincent Square, the central London playing fields for Westminster School.

== Honours ==
=== Chelsea ===
- First Division: 1954-55
