= Ted Drake =

English footballer (1912–1995)

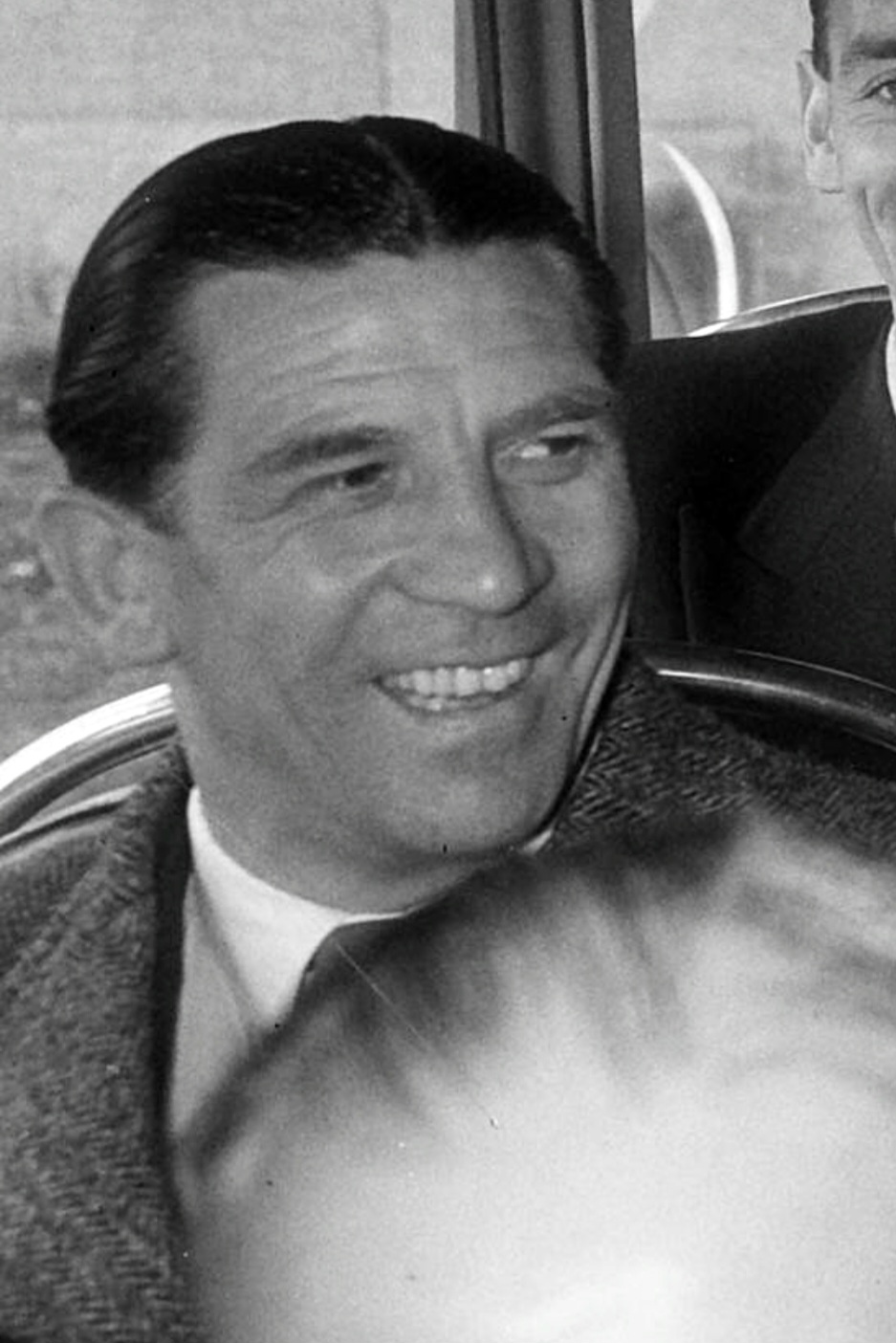
- Drake in 1955

Personal information
- Full name: Edward Joseph Drake
- Date of birth: 16 August 1912
- Place of birth: Southampton, England
- Date of death: 30 May 1995 (aged 82)
- Place of death: Raynes Park, England
- Height: 5 ft 10 in (1.78 m)
- Position: Centre forward

Youth career
- Winchester City

Senior career*
| Years | Team | Apps | (Gls) |
| 1931–1934 | Southampton | 71 | (47) |
| 1934–1945 | Arsenal | 167 | (124) |
| Total | | 238 | (171) |

International career
| 1934–1938 | England | 5 | (6) |

Managerial career
- 1946–1947: Hendon
- 1947–1952: Reading
- 1952–1961: Chelsea
- * Club domestic league appearances and goals

Edward Joseph Drake (16 August 1912 – 30 May 1995) was an English football player and manager. As a player, he first played for Southampton but made his name playing for Arsenal in the 1930s, winning two league titles and an FA Cup, as well as five caps for England. Drake is Arsenal's joint fifth highest goalscorer of all time. He also holds the record for the most goals scored in a top flight game in English football, with seven against Aston Villa in December 1935. A former centre forward, Drake has been described as a "classic number 9" and as a "strong, powerful, brave and almost entirely unthinking" player who "typified the English view."

After retiring from playing football, Drake became a manager, most notably of Chelsea. In 1955, he led the club to their first league title. This made him the first person to win the English top-flight as both a player and a manager. He was also a cricketer, but only ever played sparingly for Hampshire.

== Club career ==
=== Southampton ===
Born in Southampton, Drake started playing at Winchester City, whilst continuing to work as a gas-meter reader. He nearly joined Spurs as a schoolboy, but missed the trial match with an injury. In June 1931, he was persuaded by George Kay to join Southampton, then playing in Division Two. He made his Saints debut on 14 November 1931 at Swansea Town, and signed as a professional in November, becoming first-choice centre-forward by the end of the 1931–32 season.

In the following season he made 33 league appearances, scoring 20 goals. After only one full season, his bravery and skill attracted the attention of Arsenal's Herbert Chapman, who tried to persuade Drake to move to north London. Drake rejected the chance of a move to Highbury and decided to remain at The Dell. He started the 1933–34 season by scoring a hat-trick in the opening game against Bradford City, following this with at least one goal in the next four games, thereby amassing eight goals in the opening five games. By early March he had blasted his way to the top of the Football League Division Two goal-scoring table with 22 goals.

Arsenal, with George Allison now in charge, renewed their interest and Drake eventually decided to join the Gunners. Saints had declined several previous offers, but eventually were forced to sell to balance their books. Drake made a total of 74 appearances for Southampton, scoring 48 goals.

=== Arsenal ===
Drake moved to Arsenal in March 1934 for £6,500, and scored on his league debut against Wolves on 24 March 1934, in a 3–2 win. Although he joined too late to qualify for a League Championship medal in 1933–34, Drake would win one in 1934–35, scoring 42 goals in 41 league games in the process – this included three hat-tricks and four four-goal hauls. With two more goals in the FA Cup and Charity Shield, Drake scored 44 in all that season, breaking Jack Lambert's club record, one that still holds to this day.

The following season, 1935–36 Drake scored seven in a single match against Aston Villa at Villa Park on 14 December 1935, a club record and top flight record that also still stands. Drake claimed an eighth shot hit the crossbar and went over the line, but the referee waved away his appeal. Drake would go on to win the FA Cup in 1935–36 with him scoring the only goal in the final and the League title again in 1937–38 with Arsenal.

Despite being injured regularly (he was a doubt up until the last minute for the 1936 Cup Final), Drake's speed, fierce shooting and brave playing style meant he was Arsenal's first-choice centre forward for the rest of the decade, and he was the club's top scorer for each of the five seasons from 1934–35 to 1938–39. The Second World War curtailed Drake's career, although he served in the Royal Air Force as well as turning out for Arsenal in wartime games and also appearing as a guest player for West Ham United later in World War II. However, Drake's career would not last long into peacetime; a spinal injury incurred in a game against Reading in 1945 forced him to retire from playing. With 139 goals in 184 games, he is along with Jimmy Brain the joint-fifth all-time scorer for Arsenal.

Drake was one of 32 Arsenal legends who were emblazoned in a mural upon the walls of the club's Emirates Stadium.

== International career ==
Drake's exploits at club level brought him recognition at international level, and he made his England debut against Italy in the "Battle of Highbury" on 14 November 1934. As one of seven Arsenal players in the side, he scored the third goal in a heated 3–2 win. With England Drake also went on to win the 1935 British Home Championship title. In total he won five caps, scoring six times for the Three Lions.

== Cricket career ==
Drake made his debut for Hampshire in 1931 and shared a vital stand of 86 with Phil Mead against Glamorgan. He made 45 but never reached this score again in the 15 further matches he played over the next six years, first as an amateur and then as a professional.

== Managerial career ==
=== Hendon and Reading ===
After retiring as a player, Drake managed Hendon in 1946, and then Reading from 1947. He led the club to the runners-up spot in Division Three South in 1948–49 and again in 1951–52, though at the time only the champions were promoted.

=== Chelsea ===
He was appointed manager of First Division Chelsea in June 1952. Upon Drake's arrival at Chelsea, he made a series of sweeping changes, doing much to rid the club of its previous image. He discarded the club's Chelsea pensioner crest and with it the Pensioners nickname, and insisted a new one be adopted. From these changes came the Lion Rampant Regardant crest and the Blues nickname. He introduced scouting reports and a new, tougher, training regime based on ballwork, a rare practice in English football at the time. The club's previous policy of signing unreliable big-name players was abandoned; Drake instead used his knowledge of the lower divisions and the amateur game to recruit little-known, but more reliable players. These included John McNichol, Frank Blunstone, Derek Saunders, Jim Lewis and Peter Sillett

Within three years, in the 1954–55 season, Drake had led Chelsea to their first league championship triumph. In doing so, he became the first person to win the league title both as player and manager. However, Drake never came close to repeating the success. The championship-winning side was gradually broken up, to be replaced by the crop of youngsters emerging from the club's youth team, such as Jimmy Greaves, Peter Brabrook and Bobby Tambling. Thereafter performances and results were erratic, leaving the club stranded in mid-table; an FA Cup loss to Fourth Division side Crewe Alexandra weakened his position at the club and a few months later during the 1961–62 season Drake was dismissed.

=== Later career ===
After leaving Chelsea, he became reserve team manager at Fulham, where he was also assistant to the manager Vic Buckingham. In December he joined Barcelona as assistant to Buckingham, staying until June 1970. He later returned to Fulham where he became a chief scout, director and life president of the Cottagers. Drake died at the age of 82 on 30 May 1995.

== Honours ==
=== Player ===
Arsenal

- Football League First Division: 1934–35, 1937–38
- FA Cup: 1935–36
- FA Charity Shield: 1934, 1938

England

- British Home Championship: 1935

=== Manager ===
Chelsea

- Football League First Division: 1954–55
- FA Charity Shield: 1955

=== Individual ===
- First Division Golden Boot: 1935

== See also ==
- List of English football championship winning managers

== Bibliography ==
- Gary Chalk & Duncan Holley (1987). Saints – A complete record. Breedon Books. ISBN 0-907969-22-4.
- Duncan Holley & Gary Chalk (1992). The Alphabet of the Saints. ACL & Polar Publishing. ISBN 0-9514862-3-3.
- Harris, Jeff (1995). Hogg, Tony (ed.). Arsenal Who's Who. Independent UK Sports. ISBN 1-899429-03-4.
