= 1954–55 in English football =

Football in England
- Season: 1954–55

Men's football
- First Division: Chelsea
- Second Division: Birmingham
- FA Cup: Newcastle United

The 1954–55 season was the 75th season of competitive football in England, from August 1954 to May 1955.

== Overview ==
Chelsea, managed by legendary former Arsenal forward Ted Drake, celebrate their 50th anniversary by winning the league championship. They finish four points ahead of their nearest three rivals Wolverhampton Wanderers, Portsmouth and Sunderland.

Manchester United's new-look side with an emphasis on youth finish fifth, their title hopes dashed only by a slow start to the season. Just before the end of the season, their 18-year-old half-back Duncan Edwards becomes the youngest full England international of the 20th century.

Tottenham Hotspur can only manage a 16th-place finish in the First Division, despite the acquisition of skilful half-back Danny Blanchflower from Aston Villa.

This was the first season in Liverpool F.C.'s history in which they had played in the second division and not been champions. They had had three seasons in the division previously – 1893–94, 1895–96 and 1904–05, and were immediately promoted as champions each time.

Newcastle United win the FA Cup for the sixth time, matching the record set by Aston Villa. Three of those victories have come in the last five seasons.

UEFA announces that the European Champions Cup will be introduced from next season, to be contested between the champions of European domestic leagues, including those from Eastern Bloc countries.

== Events ==
- 29 September 1954 – Champions Wolverhampton Wanderers and FA Cup holders West Bromwich Albion share the Charity Shield after a 4–4 draw.
- 16 November 1954 – Wolverhampton Wanderers defeat Spartak Moscow 4–0 at Molineux, a team widely regarded as one of the best in the world.
- 11 December 1954 – Liverpool suffer the heaviest defeat of their history, losing 9–1 at Birmingham City in the Second Division.
- 13 December 1954 – Wolves restore some pride to English football with a 3–2 win over Budapest Honvéd FC of Hungary, a team containing seven Hungarian internationals who defeated England 6–3 at Wembley in 1953, including Ferenc Puskás. It prompts the famous newspaper headline, which proclaims Wolves as the champions of the world.
- April 1955 – Gabriel Hanot's proposal for a European Champions' Cup is formally endorsed at the UEFA Congress.
- 2 April 1955 – England win the British Home Championship after a 7–2 defeat of Scotland, in which the 40-year-old Stanley Matthews creates five goals and the 18-year-old Manchester United protégé Duncan Edwards makes his debut.
- 16 April 1955 – Chelsea go four points clear of reigning league champions Wolverhampton in second with a draw with Portsmouth: the Londoners have two matches remaining of the season while Wolves have three. Six points behind the Pensioners are Portsmouth, Sunderland and Manchester City: the latter are chasing the Double, having qualified for the 1955 FA Cup Final.
- 18 April 1955 – Inauguration of the Inter-Cities Fairs Cup.
- 23 April 1955 – Chelsea secure the championship with a 3–0 home win against Sheffield Wednesday.
- 4 May 1955 – Birmingham City win 5–1 at Doncaster Rovers to finish level on points with both Luton Town and Rotherham United in the Second Division. On goal average, Birmingham are promoted as champions, Luton as runners-up while Rotherham miss out.
- 7 May 1955 – Newcastle United win the FA Cup, defeating Manchester City 3–1 at Wembley. Jackie Milburn opens the scoring after just 45 seconds – a Wembley Cup final record which stands for the next 42 years.

== Honours ==
Competition	Winner	Runner-up
First Division	Chelsea (1)	Wolverhampton Wanderers
Second Division	Birmingham City	Luton Town
Third Division North	Barnsley	Accrington Stanley
Third Division South	Bristol City	Leyton Orient
FA Cup	Newcastle United (6*)	Manchester City
Charity Shield	Wolverhampton Wanderers and West Bromwich Albion (shared)	
Home Championship	England	Scotland

Notes = Number in parentheses is the times that club has won that honour. * indicates new record for competition

== Awards ==
Football Writers' Association

- Footballer of the Year – Don Revie (Manchester City)

Top goalscorer

- Ronnie Allen (West Bromwich Albion), 27

== Football League ==
=== First Division ===
Pos	Team	Pld	W	D	L	GF	GA	GAv	Pts	Qualification or relegation
1	Chelsea (C)	42	20	12	10	81	57	1.421	52	Denied entry to the European Cup (Note: Chelsea were invited to play at the inaugural European Cup but were barred from participation by The FA.)
2	Wolverhampton Wanderers	42	19	10	13	89	70	1.271	48	
3	Portsmouth	42	18	12	12	74	62	1.194	48	
4	Sunderland	42	15	18	9	64	54	1.185	48	
5	Manchester United	42	20	7	15	84	74	1.135	47	
6	Aston Villa	42	20	7	15	72	73	0.986	47	
7	Manchester City	42	18	10	14	76	69	1.101	46	
8	Newcastle United	42	17	9	16	89	77	1.156	43	
9	Arsenal	42	17	9	16	69	63	1.095	43	
10	Burnley	42	17	9	16	51	48	1.063	43	
11	Everton	42	16	10	16	62	68	0.912	42	
12	Huddersfield Town	42	14	13	15	63	68	0.926	41	
13	Sheffield United	42	17	7	18	70	86	0.814	41	
14	Preston North End	42	16	8	18	83	64	1.297	40	
15	Charlton Athletic	42	15	10	17	76	75	1.013	40	
16	Tottenham Hotspur	42	16	8	18	72	73	0.986	40	
17	West Bromwich Albion	42	16	8	18	76	96	0.792	40	
18	Bolton Wanderers	42	13	13	16	62	69	0.899	39	
19	Blackpool	42	14	10	18	60	64	0.938	38	
20	Cardiff City	42	13	11	18	62	76	0.816	37	
21	Leicester City (R)	42	12	11	19	74	86	0.860	35	Relegation to the Second Division
22	Sheffield Wednesday (R)	42	8	10	24	63	100	0.630	26	Relegation to the Second Division

Source: World Football
Rules for classification: 1) Points; 2) Goal average; 3) Goals scored
(C) Champions; (R) Relegated

=== Second Division ===
Pos	Team	Pld	W	D	L	GF	GA	GAv	Pts	Qualification or relegation
1	Birmingham City (C, P)	42	22	10	10	92	47	1.957	54	Inter-Cities Fairs Cup group stage and promotion to the First Division
2	Luton Town (P)	42	23	8	11	88	53	1.660	54	Promotion to the First Division
3	Rotherham United	42	25	4	13	94	64	1.469	54	
4	Leeds United	42	23	7	12	70	53	1.321	53	
5	Stoke City	42	21	10	11	69	46	1.500	52	
6	Blackburn Rovers	42	22	6	14	114	79	1.443	50	
7	Notts County	42	21	6	15	74	71	1.042	48	
8	West Ham United	42	18	10	14	74	70	1.057	46	
9	Bristol Rovers	42	19	7	16	75	70	1.071	45	
10	Swansea Town	42	17	9	16	86	83	1.036	43	
11	Liverpool	42	16	10	16	92	96	0.958	42	
12	Middlesbrough	42	18	6	18	73	82	0.890	42	
13	Bury	42	15	11	16	77	72	1.069	41	
14	Fulham	42	14	11	17	76	79	0.962	39	
15	Nottingham Forest	42	16	7	19	58	62	0.935	39	
16	Lincoln City	42	13	10	19	68	79	0.861	36	
17	Port Vale	42	12	11	19	48	71	0.676	35	
18	Doncaster Rovers	42	14	7	21	58	95	0.611	35	
19	Hull City	42	12	10	20	44	69	0.638	34	
20	Plymouth Argyle	42	12	7	23	57	82	0.695	31	
21	Ipswich Town (R)	42	11	6	25	57	92	0.620	28	Relegation to the Third Division South
22	Derby County (R)	42	7	9	26	53	82	0.646	23	Relegation to the Third Division North

Rules for classification: 1) Points; 2) Goal average; 3) Goals scored
(C) Champions; (P) Promoted; (R) Relegated

=== Third Division North ===
Pos	Team	Pld	W	D	L	GF	GA	GAv	Pts	Promotion or relegation
1	Barnsley (C, P)	46	30	5	11	86	46	1.870	65	Promotion to the Second Division
2	Accrington Stanley	46	25	11	10	96	67	1.433	61	
3	Scunthorpe & Lindsey United	46	23	12	11	81	53	1.528	58	
4	York City	46	24	10	12	92	63	1.460	58	
5	Hartlepools United	46	25	5	16	64	49	1.306	55	
6	Chesterfield	46	24	6	16	81	70	1.157	54	
7	Gateshead	46	20	12	14	65	69	0.942	52	
8	Workington	46	18	14	14	68	55	1.236	50	
9	Stockport County	46	18	12	16	84	70	1.200	48	
10	Oldham Athletic	46	19	10	17	74	68	1.088	48	
11	Southport	46	16	16	14	47	44	1.068	48	
12	Rochdale	46	17	14	15	69	66	1.045	48	
13	Mansfield Town	46	18	9	19	65	71	0.915	45	
14	Halifax Town	46	15	13	18	63	67	0.940	43	
15	Darlington	46	14	14	18	62	73	0.849	42	
16	Bradford (Park Avenue)	46	15	11	20	56	70	0.800	41	
17	Barrow	46	17	6	23	70	89	0.787	40	
18	Wrexham	46	13	12	21	65	77	0.844	38	
19	Tranmere Rovers	46	13	11	22	55	70	0.786	37	
20	Carlisle United	46	15	6	25	78	89	0.876	36	
21	Bradford City	46	13	10	23	47	55	0.855	36	
22	Crewe Alexandra	46	10	14	22	68	91	0.747	34	
23	Grimsby Town	46	13	8	25	47	78	0.603	34	Re-elected
24	Chester	46	12	9	25	44	77	0.571	33	Re-elected

Source: rsssf.com
(C) Champions; (P) Promoted

=== Third Division South ===
Pos	Team	Pld	W	D	L	GF	GA	GAv	Pts	Promotion or relegation
1	Bristol City (C, P)	46	30	10	6	101	47	2.149	70	Promotion to the Second Division
2	Leyton Orient	46	26	9	11	89	47	1.894	61	
3	Southampton	46	24	11	11	75	51	1.471	59	
4	Gillingham	46	20	15	11	77	66	1.167	55	
5	Millwall	46	20	11	15	72	68	1.059	51	
6	Brighton & Hove Albion	46	20	10	16	76	63	1.206	50	
7	Watford	46	18	14	14	71	62	1.145	50	
8	Torquay United	46	18	12	16	82	82	1.000	48	
9	Coventry City	46	18	11	17	67	59	1.136	47	
10	Southend United	46	17	12	17	83	80	1.038	46	
11	Brentford	46	16	14	16	82	82	1.000	46	
12	Norwich City	46	18	10	18	60	60	1.000	46	
13	Northampton Town	46	19	8	19	73	81	0.901	46	
14	Aldershot	46	16	13	17	75	71	1.056	45	
15	Queens Park Rangers	46	15	14	17	69	75	0.920	44	
16	Shrewsbury Town	46	16	10	20	70	78	0.897	42	
17	Bournemouth & Boscombe Athletic	46	12	18	16	57	65	0.877	42	
18	Reading	46	13	15	18	65	73	0.890	41	
19	Newport County	46	11	16	19	60	73	0.822	38	
20	Crystal Palace	46	11	16	19	52	80	0.650	38	
21	Swindon Town	46	11	15	20	46	64	0.719	37	
22	Exeter City	46	11	15	20	47	73	0.644	37	
23	Walsall	46	10	14	22	75	86	0.872	34	Re-elected
24	Colchester United	46	9	13	24	53	91	0.582	31	Re-elected

Source: rsssf.com
(C) Champions; (P) Promoted

=== Top goalscorers ===
First Division

- Ronnie Allen (West Bromwich) – 27 goals

Second Division

- Tommy Briggs (Blackburn Rovers) – 33 goals

Third Division North

- Don Travis (Oldham Athletic), John Connor (Stockport County) and Arthur Bottom (York City) – 30 goals

Third Division South

- Ernie Morgan (Gillingham) – 31 goals

== Non-League honours ==
Competition	Winners
Isthmian League	Walthamstow Avenue
FA Amateur Cup	Bishop Auckland

== National team ==
Date	Opposition	Venue	Competition	Result	Score
2 October 1954	Northern Ireland	Windsor Park, Belfast	British Championship	Won	2–0
10 November 1954	Wales	Wembley Stadium	British Championship	Won	3–2
1 December 1954	West Germany	Wembley Stadium	Friendly	Won	3–1
2 April 1955	Scotland	Wembley Stadium	British Championship	Won	7–2
15 May 1955	France	Stade Olympique Yves-du-Manoir, Paris	Friendly	Lost	0–1
18 May 1955	Spain	Nuevo Estadio Chamartin, Madrid	Friendly	Drew	1–1
22 May 1955	Portugal	Estadio das Antas, Porto	Friendly	Lost	1–3
