= History of Fulham F.C. =

History of an English football club

The history of Fulham Football Club, an English professional football club based in Fulham, West London, dates back to the club's formation in 1879.

== 1879–1898: Amateur days ==
Fulham started its existence in 1879 as St Andrew's Cricket & Football Club, founded by worshippers at St. Andrew's Church, Fulham on Star Road, West Kensington, which still stands today with a plaque commemorating the team's foundation. They won the West London Cup in 1887 and, having shortened the name to its present form in 1888, they then won the West London League in 1893 at the first attempt. The club's first ever kit was dark and light blue halved shirts with white shorts. Fulham started playing at their current ground Craven Cottage in 1896, their first game against now defunct rivals Minerva F.C.

== 1898–1907: Southern League ==
Years	League
1898-03	Southern League Division 2
1903-07	Southern League Division 1

The club gained professional status on 12 December 1898, in the same year that they were admitted into the Southern League's 2nd division. By this time, they wore a kit very similar to modern Arsenal colours in this period, which was worn during the 1896–97 season. In 1902–03, they won promotion from this division, entering the Southern League 1st Division. The club's first white club kit came in 1903, and ever since then the club has been playing in white shirts and black shorts, with socks going through various evolutions of black and/or white, but are now normally white-only. The club won the Southern League twice, in 1905–06 and 1906–07. (Link)

== 1907–1949: Into the Football League ==
1907–28	Football League Div. 2	(Level 2)
1928–32	Football League Div. 3S	(Level 3)
1932–49	Football League Div. 2	(Level 2)

Fulham gained admission to the national Football League after the second of their Southern League triumphs. The club's first ever league game, playing in the 2nd Division's 1907-8 season, saw them losing 1–0 at home to Hull City on 3 September 1907. The first win came a few days later on 7 September 1907 at Derby County's Baseball Ground, by a score of 1–0. When they eventually found their feet in the division they impressed, ending up only three points short of promotion in fourth place. However, this was the best season they had in their 21-year stay in that division, and after only winning 13 out of 42 games in the 1927–28 season Fulham were relegated to the 3rd Division South, which was created in 1920.

A highlight of that first season was an 8–3 away win at Luton Town in an FA Cup game. The club actually managed to reach the semi-finals of that tournament, where they were humbled 6–0 by Newcastle United. This is still a record loss for an FA Cup semi-final game. A couple of years later, the club won the London Challenge Cup in the 1909–10 season.

During this period, businessman and politician Henry Norris was the club chairman and curiously he had an indirect role in the foundation of Fulham's local rivals Chelsea. When he rejected an offer from businessman Gus Mears to move Fulham to land where the present-day Chelsea stadium Stamford Bridge is situated, Mears decided to create his own team to occupy the ground. In 1910, Norris started to combine his role at Fulham with the chairmanship of Arsenal.

After finishing fifth, seventh and ninth (out of 22 teams) in their first three seasons in the 3rd Division South, Fulham won the division in the 1931–32 season. In doing so, they beat Torquay United 10–2, won 24 out of 42 games and scored 111 goals, thus being promoted back to the Second Division. The next season, they missed out on a second consecutive promotion, finishing third behind Tottenham Hotspur and Stoke City. A mixed bag of league performances followed, although the club also reached another FA Cup semi-final during the 1935–36 season. On 8 October 1938, Craven Cottage saw its all-time highest attendance at a match against Millwall, with a crowd of 49,335 watching the game.

League and cup football were severely disrupted by the outbreak of World War II in 1939, with the Football League split into regional divisions temporarily, with a national Football League War Cup and a London War Cup up for grabs. Post-war, a full league programme was only restored for 1946–47. In the third season of what is now considered the modern era of football, Fulham finished top of the Second Division, with a win–loss–draw record of 24–9–9 (identical to that which won them the 3rd Division South 17 years previously).

== 1949–1970: Reaching the top flight ==
Promotion to the top flight of English football saw the club perform poorly, finishing 17th in their first year and 18th in their second. In only their third season of First Division football, Fulham finished rock bottom of the 22-team league in the 1951–52 season, winning only 8 of 42 games. On 20 May 1951, Fulham played one of their first ever games in North America in an exhibition match against Celtic at Delorimier Stadium in Montreal in front of 29,000 spectators.

1949–52	Football League Div. 1	(Level 1)
1952–59	Football League Div. 2	(Level 2)
1959–68	Football League Div. 1	(Level 1)
1968-69	Football League Div. 2	(Level 2)

A few seasons of mediocrity in the 2nd Division followed, but then the club reached the FA Cup semi-finals in 1958 and used this momentum to win promotion back to the 1st Division in the following season, having finished second to Sheffield Wednesday. Also joining Fulham in 1958 was Graham Leggat, who went on to score 134 goals in 277 appearances, making him the club's fifth all-time top scorer. In the 1959–60 season, they achieved tenth position in the 1st Division, which until finishing ninth in the 2003–04 FA Premier League was their highest ever league position. This accompanied another appearance in the last four of the FA Cup in 1962.

By this time the club were regularly playing in front of 30,000 plus crowds at Craven Cottage, despite struggling in the League. The club experienced several close escapes from relegation none more spectacular than in 1965–66. On the morning of 26 February 1966, Fulham had just 15 points from 29 matches. The last 13 games saw Fulham win nine and draw two to reach safety. Eventually the club suffered relegation in the 1967–68 season, having won just 10 out of their 42 games. Even that, however, was not as catastrophic as the calamity of next season. Winning only 7 in 42, the club were again relegated to the 3rd Division. (Note that this is not the same as the 3rd Division South, as the regional 3rd Divisions had been removed with the 1959 creation of the 4th Division).

It is impossible to talk about Fulham's history without mentioning probably the single most influential character in Fulham's history, Johnny Haynes. "Mr. Fulham" or "The Maestro", as he later came to be known, signed for the Cottagers as a schoolboy in 1950, making his first team debut on Boxing Day 1952 against Southampton at Craven Cottage. Haynes played for another 18 years, making 657 appearances (along with many other club records too), his last appearance for Fulham coming on 17 January 1970. He is often considered as the greatest player in Fulham history, and never played for another team in Britain. He gained 56 caps for England (22 as captain), with many being earned while playing for Fulham in the Second Division. Haynes was injured in a car accident in Blackpool in 1962, but by his own admissions never regained the fitness or form to play for England again, missing out on England's victory in the 1966 FIFA World Cup, which he would have stood a chance of being selected for. The Stevenage Road Stand was renamed in his honour after his death in a car crash in 2005.

== 1970–1994: Bouncing between the second and third tiers ==
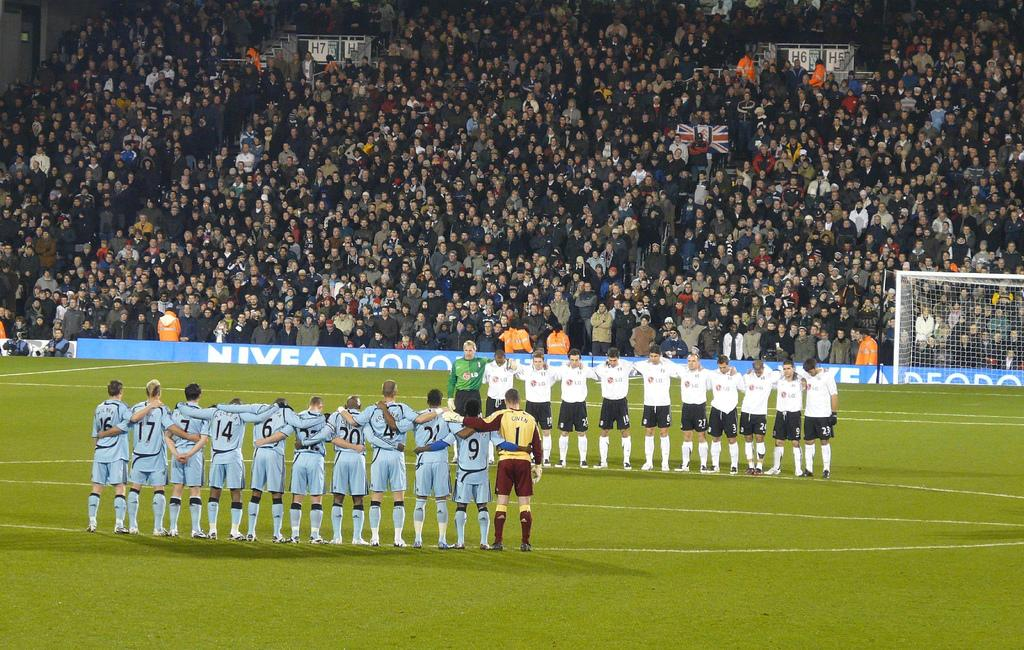
A minute's silence for Jim Langley

The aforementioned 3rd Division hiatus lasted only two seasons though, they were then promoted back to the Second Division as runners-up in 1970–71. This spell also saw Fulham invited to the not particularly prestigious Anglo-Italian Cup, which saw the club draw four out of four games in 1973. Thus started off a period of high-profile signings for the club under Alec Stock in the mid-1970s, including Alan Mullery and Bobby Moore. The reward of this was their only ever FA Cup final in 1975, having won their first semi-final in five attempts. The club then lost to West Ham United in the final. This gained the club qualification to another low-key European tournament, the Anglo-Scottish Cup, where they made the final, losing to Middlesbrough.

That run in the FA Cup saw the setting of an improbable record, that of the most games needed to reach the final, Fulham playing 11 games including replays. In the buildup to the 12th game, the Wembley final, Tony Rees and the Cottagers released a single, "Viva el Fulham" (based on Manolo Escobar's "Y viva España") which is still played (and occasionally chanted) at Fulham games. It reached number 46 in the Pop Charts in 1975.

1969–71	Football League Div. 3	(Level 3)
1971–80	Football League Div. 2	(Level 2)
1980–82	Football League Div. 3	(Level 3)
1982–86	Football League Div. 2	(Level 2)
1986–94	Football League Div. 3/2	(Level 3)

George Best played 47 times for the club in the 1976–77 season. Rodney Marsh, who having grown up with Fulham in the 1960s went on to play 1st Division football and play for England, rejoined the club in the same season, playing only 16 games. This capped one of the most successful eras in Fulham history.

The hangover from this meant the club were relegated again after winning only 11 in 42 in the 1979–80 season, followed by Bobby Campbell's sacking in October 1980, replaced by Malcolm Macdonald. With a strong squad during his 1980–1984 period in charge (with players such as Ray Houghton, Tony Gale, Paul Parker, Gerry Peyton and Ray Lewington), they won promotion again in 1981–82 back to Division 2. In 1980, Fulham founded the rugby league club that is now Harlequins RL, designed to be an extra stream of income for the football club. Then called Fulham Rugby League, they played at Craven Cottage until moving away from the parent club in 1984.

Fulham narrowly missed out on back-to-back promotions to the First Division, losing 1–0 to Derby County away on the last day of the 1982–83 season – although the match was abandoned after 88 minutes due to a pitch invasion. The side which had shown so much promise was gradually sold off and broken up as the club had debts to pay off, so it was little surprise when the club were relegated again to the Third Division in 1986. The club nearly went out of business in 1987 with the breakdown of an ill-advised merger attempt with Queens Park Rangers. The intervention of the Football League and the emergence of a consortium fronted by ex-player Jimmy Hill allowed the club to stay in business as a re-structured Fulham FC (1987) Ltd. In the same year, the club took part in the longest penalty decider recorded to that time – it needed 28 spot kicks to sort out a winner between them and Aldershot in a Freight Rover Trophy match.

In 1992, the foundation of the Premier League, and the resignation of the entire top division from the Football League, saw Fulham elevated to the 2nd Division. The club, however, was relegated from that to the new 3rd Division after a poor 1993–94 season, following which Ian Branfoot was appointed manager.

== 1994–97: Fulham start rise from fourth tier ==
1994–97	Football League Div. 3	(Level 4)

After an eighth-place finish in Branfoot's first season in charge, the club hit its lowest position since Edwardian times, in the 1995–96 season, finishing 17th out of 24. This season included a loss against Torquay United, who were at the time bottom of the Division, with Fulham just one place above them. Branfoot was soon sacked as team manager, but remained at the club in other capacities for a short while.

In February 1996, the club appointed then-player Micky Adams as manager, and it was in the summer of that year that his revolution really took off. That signalled the start of the new era of Fulham. Adams was appointed as manager and oversaw an upturn in form that lifted the side out of what little relegation danger was present (as it turned out, no team was even relegated from the league that season). The next campaign, he engineered a complete turnaround in form and his side, captained by Simon Morgan, finished second – only missing out on first place because the League had dropped the old "goal difference" to decide tied positions, system in favour of a "goals scored" tally. (While Fulham's goal difference was one better than that of champions Wigan Athletic, they scored 12 fewer goals.) This was somewhat ironic, as the club's then chairman Jimmy Hill had successfully argued that goals scored should decide positions of teams tied on points at the Football League's 1992 AGM.

== 1997–2001: Al Fayed's revolution ==
1997–99	Football League Div. 2	(Level 3)
1999–01	Football League Div. 1	(Level 2)
2001–	Premier League	(Level 1)

Millionaire Mohamed Al-Fayed purchased the club that summer and fired Adams after a mid-table start. He installed a two-tier management "dream team" of Ray Wilkins (as first team manager) and Kevin Keegan (as chief operating officer), pledging that the club would reach the Premier League within five years.

After an argument over team selection, Wilkins left the club in May 1998 to hand over the full managerial duties to Keegan, who steered the club to a spectacular promotion the next season, winning 101 points out of a possible 138, after splashing £1.1 million to sign Paul Peschisolido from West Bromwich Albion who was top scorer and captained by Chris Coleman, then the most expensive footballer outside the top two divisions of the English league. Keegan then left to become manager of the England national team, and veteran player Paul Bracewell was put in charge.

Bracewell was sacked in March 2000, as Fulham's promising early season form dwindled away to mid-table mediocrity. Frenchman Jean Tigana was put in charge and with only two changes to the first team, including French striker Louis Saha, he guided Fulham to their third promotion in five seasons in the 2000–01 season in emphatic style, scoring 90 goals in 46 games. That gave Fulham top-flight status for the first time since 1968, which had only taken four years – one shorter than Al Fayed's pledge. During this season, club captain and subsequent manager Chris Coleman was involved in a car crash which put him out of action for well over a year and eventually ended his playing career after he failed to make a sufficient recovery. Fulham's run through the divisions saw many players come and go, and the only player to play for the club in all four leagues was Sean Davis, indeed he is one of few players to ever have played in four divisions of professional football with one team.

== 2001–07: Premiership years ==
Despite some scepticism, Fulham were widely tipped to take the Premier League by storm, with many pundits predicting a challenge for the UEFA Cup or even UEFA Champions League places, but their first Premier League season was largely underwhelming; despite a couple of good games and some flashes of brilliance, the end product was a respectable 13th-place finish. Fulham remain the only team in this millennium to host top-flight football with some standing areas. Due to restrictions on standings, Fulham decamped to Loftus Road during the 2002–03 and 2003–04 seasons while their own stadium was rebuilt, but then returned to Craven Cottage.

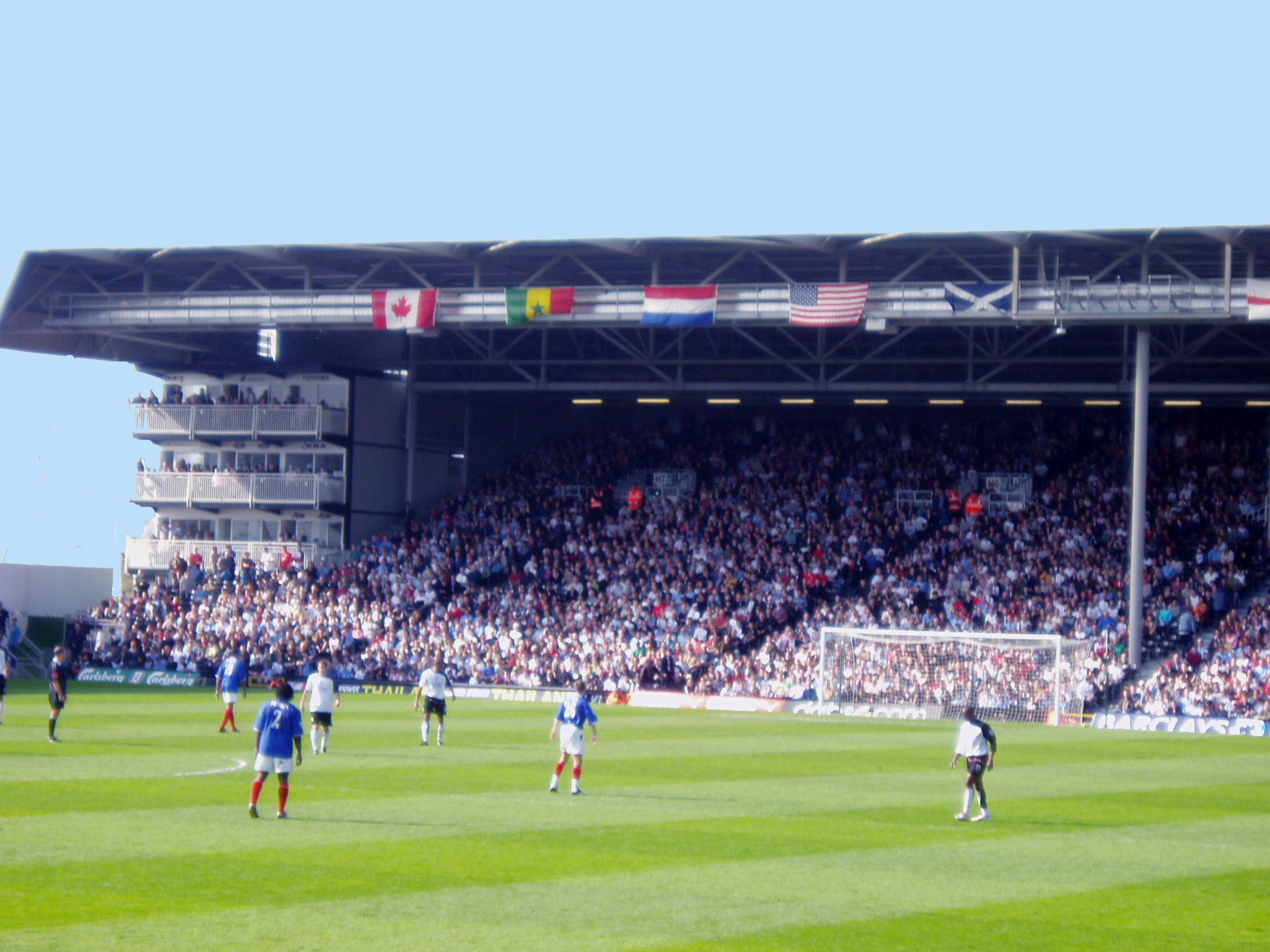
Fulham (White) playing Portsmouth (Blue) in front of Fulham fans in the Hammersmith End.

The following season saw Fulham dangerously close to the relegation zone, and chairman Mohammed Al Fayed told Tigana that his contract would not be renewed at the end of the season. But an awful run of results, culminating in a 4–0 home defeat by Blackburn Rovers led him to be sacked before the season came to an end with relegation desperately near. Jean Tigana made the club's record signing, buying Steve Marlet from Lyon for £11.5 million. He failed to live up to expectations, however, playing only 54 league games in three years and scoring only 11 goals. He was loaned out to Marseille for 18 months when Coleman took over, with his sizeable contract still being paid by the English team, before it eventually expired.

Chris Coleman took charge for five games at the end of that (2002–03) season, earning Fulham 10 points out of a possible 15 and preserving a place in the Premier League for the next season. Coleman was given the manager's job on a permanent basis in the summer of 2003 and despite predictions that the inexperience of Coleman would result in Fulham's relegation, he kept the club well clear of relegation, guiding them to a club record ninth-place finish in his debut season. This might have been greater had the club not come under significant financial pressure to sell Louis Saha to Manchester United, for which they received a club record £13 million. The final day of the season saw them win 2–0 away to Bolton Wanderers, a third goal could have seen them jump the Trotters into eighth place.

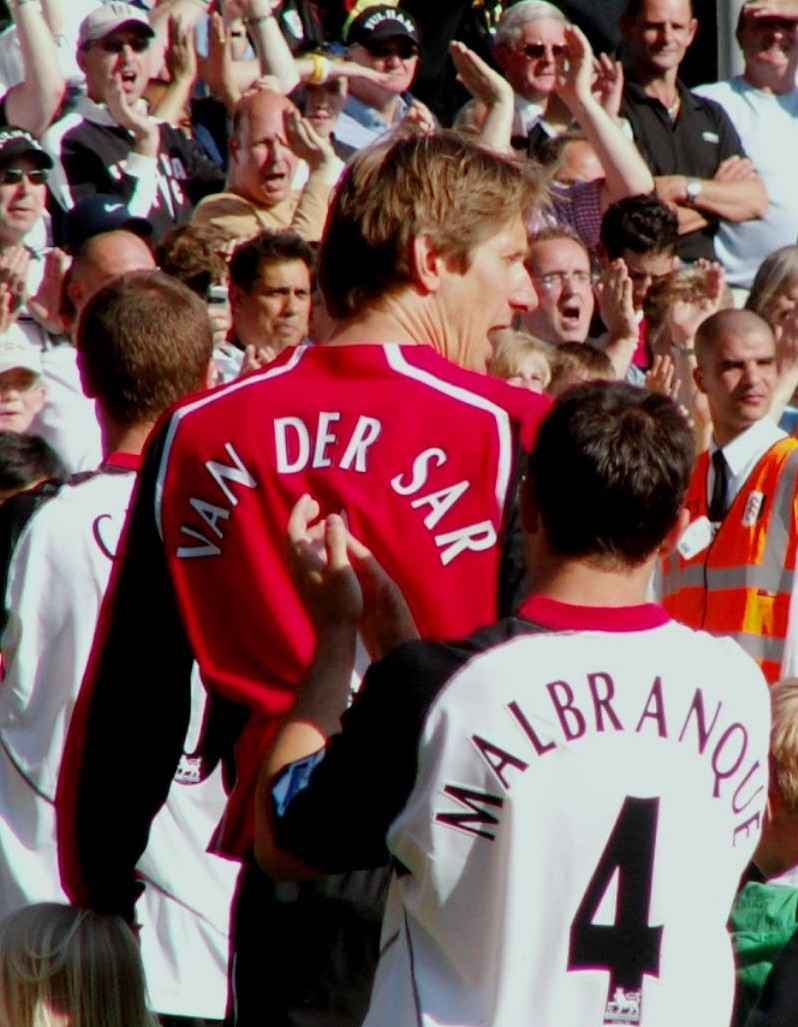
Van der Sar and Malbranque at Fulham

Coleman notched up another impressive performance in the 2004–05 season and guided Fulham to a secure 13th-place finish.

The 2005–06 season proved a tougher affair, but safety was once again mathematically assured with three games left of the season and a 1–0 win over Wigan. There were three relative high points in an inconsistent season: a 6–1 rout of West Bromwich Albion, a 1–0 win over rivals and champions Chelsea in the West London derby and a 2–0 win over 2005 European champions Liverpool. Fulham's home form was the best outside the top six, with 12 wins from 18 games, while their away form was the worst in the entire league with one win and four draws from 18 games. A game they were winning away 1–0, against Sunderland, was abandoned after 21 minutes because of persistent snowfall. Finally, on 29 April 2006, Fulham achieved a first away victory of the campaign with a 2–1 win over Manchester City. Despite the difficulties experienced throughout this season, Fulham achieved a 12th-place finish, an improvement on the previous campaign.

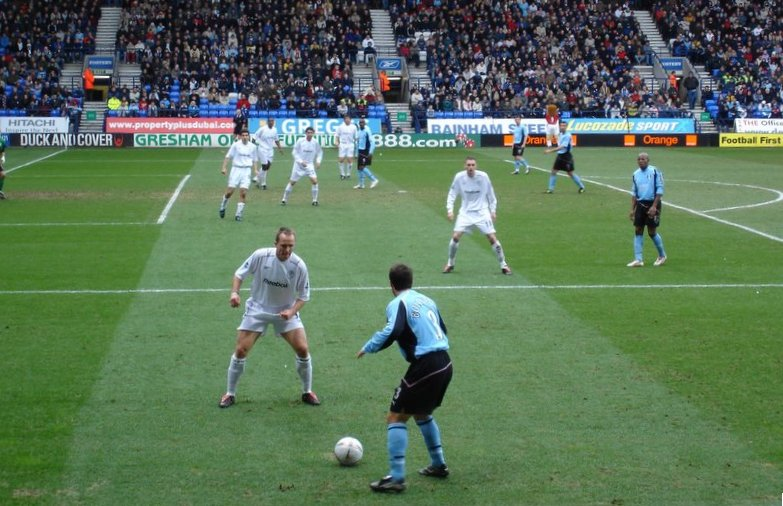
Fulham playing in light blue against Bolton Wanderers in the FA Cup 2005.

Fulham did not get off to a good start in 2006–07, losing their first match 5–1 to Manchester United at Old Trafford. This result consigned them to the foot of the table and left them as the season's favourites for early relegation contenders with the bookies, but then recovered well and were riding as high as eighth at one point in December 2006.

During the January transfer window, Coleman added Russian midfielder Alexey Smertin, American winger Clint Dempsey and fellow countryman Simon Davies to the squad, and captured exciting loan signing Vincenzo Montella. Between mid-December and May, however, Fulham only won a single game, a 2–1 victory over Newcastle United. In the same time period, Fulham drew nine games and lost four. Additionally, Fulham were dumped meekly out of the FA Cup 4–0 by Tottenham Hotspur. On 10 April 2007, following defeats at the hands of Manchester City (3–1) and Everton (4–1), Fulham terminated the contracts of Chris Coleman and Steve Kean with immediate effect, while Northern Ireland manager Lawrie Sanchez and Les Reed were put in charge on an interim basis.

Sanchez did not have the immediate impact that the Fulham board would have hoped for. With five games to save the season, Sanchez managed only a point from the first three, a home-draw against Blackburn Rovers sandwiched between away defeats to Reading and Arsenal. In Sanchez's fourth game, Fulham took on a Liverpool side largely focused on their upcoming Champions League final against Milan. Liverpool manager Rafael Benítez made nine changes to his starting XI for the game, much to the annoyance of Neil Warnock, manager of fellow strugglers Sheffield United. Fulham, however, still faced a strong team, eager to impress and stake their claims for a starting berth in the final. January signing Clint Dempsey took the game by the scruff of the neck in the 68th minute, combining neatly with English right-back Liam Rosenior to earn Sanchez his first victory and ensure safety for the West Londoners. Fulham finished the season with a 3–1 defeat away to Middlesbrough.

Despite a return of just 4 points from a possible 15, Sanchez had retained Fulham's top-flight status and was rewarded for his efforts with a permanent contract, subsequently resigning as Northern Ireland manager on Friday 11 May 2007.

Sanchez received strong financial backing from the board and made a number of signings during the summer-break. The most expensive of these additions was striker Diomansy Kamara, a £6 million signing from Championship outfit West Brom. The majority of Sanchez's purchases, however, were players from the Northern Ireland set-up, including Steven Davis, David Healy, Aaron Hughes and Chris Baird.

Fulham showed little signs of improvement from the previous season but were unfortunate not to start the 2007–08 season with a victory, after leading Premier League title contenders Arsenal for 84 minutes at the Emirates Stadium. Healy opened his Fulham account taking advantage of a mistake by Gunners' goalkeeper Jens Lehmann in the opening minute. Robin van Persie, however, replied from the penalty spot before Belarusian Alexander Hleb added the winner in the 90th minute. Fulham brushed aside this disappointment to beat Bolton Wanderers 2–1 in the following match. Despite defensive frailties, The whites had begun their first-full season under Sanchez by playing attractive, attacking football. This Fulham team was cursed by bad luck, however, and as Sanchez was quick to point out, dubious refereeing decisions. In their third fixture of the season, at home to Gareth Southgate's Middlesbrough, striker and club captain Brian McBride was seriously injured in the process of opening the scoring, before Tony Warner's mistake allowed 'Boro back into the game. Fulham's misery and Sanchez's fury was compounded when Healy's injury time strike was incorrectly ruled out by the linesman, despite clearly crossing the goal-line.

Following this result, Fulham registered several draws, including two six-goal thrillers against Tottenham and Manchester City. Both games showcased the good and bad aspects of Fulham's play under Sanchez – incisive attacking football undone by continued poor defending. Sanchez attempted a more direct style of play to grab an elusive win but his squad were ill-suited to long ball football. Though the former Wimbledon defender oversaw a second win of the campaign at home to Reading, he was dismissed on 21 December 2007, after a defeat by Newcastle United, with Fulham in the relegation zone. His case was not helped by the number of Championship-quality players he signed and his reliance on a high-defensive live, despite employing relatively slow personnel.

== 2007–2010: Roy Hodgson years ==
Roy Hodgson was named as the new manager of Fulham on 28 December 2007, and took up his contractual duties on 30 December 2007, just two days before the January transfer window opened. The squad's spine was strengthened with the signings of Brede Hangeland, Leon Andreasen, Eddie Johnson, Erik Nevland and veteran former Liverpool striker, Jari Litmanen. Canadian captain and right-back Paul Stalteri and Finland's Toni Kallio were also signed on loan from Tottenham and Young Boys, respectively. This new look squad was complemented by the return of key players and fan favourites Brian McBride and Jimmy Bullard. Both would prove to be hugely influential in Fulham's end-of-season run-in.

Hodgson's tenure started with a 2–1 loss to Chelsea on New Year's Day, followed by a goalless draw with Bolton Wanderers at the Reebok Stadium before he claimed his first win five days later against Aston Villa, courtesy of a trademark Jimmy Bullard free-kick. Despite this positive start, Fulham struggled to build momentum and their form remained patchy throughout March. Hodgson did, however, add a second victory on 16 March 2008, against an Everton side chasing the fourth and final Champions League qualification spot. Former Toffees Simon Davies and Brian McBride combined, with the latter heading home to secure a 1–0 win at Craven Cottage.

Again, however, Fulham failed to maintain a consistent run of form following a victory. A drab 3–1 home defeat at the hands of Roy Keane's Sunderland side left Hodgson on the verge of tears in the post-match press conference and many pundits writing off Fulham's survival chances. Fans contended that although Hodgson's side were markedly improved defensively, and retained possession much better than under either Coleman or Sanchez, with aesthetically pleasing football, a lack of firepower up front and the failure to settle on a first-choice XI had hurt the team and caused vital points to be dropped.

Despite the negative press, Hodgson continued to believe survival was attainable and rallied his team to win four of their remaining five games and secure their Premier League position for the 2008–09 season. This incredible run of form started with a first away win in 34 attempts against relegation rivals Reading. For many fans, however, the turning point of the season came two games later, against Manchester City. Fulham trailed 2–0 at half-time and had the half-time scores from every game remained the same after 90 minutes, Fulham would have been relegated. The introduction of the much-maligned Diomansy Kamara, however, heralded the start of a fantastic comeback. Kamara struck twice as Fulham registered 3–2 victory and second consecutive away win.

This result set the scene for a "six-pointer" against fellow strugglers Birmingham City at Craven Cottage. McBride and Erik Nevland struck to lift Fulham out of the relegation zone for the first time in months and leave survival in the club's own hands.

Barring a seven-goal margin win by Reading, a Fulham victory against a Portsmouth side looking ahead to their first FA Cup Final appearance in 69 years would guarantee survival. This, however, would be no easy feat. Portsmouth manager Harry Redknapp, himself a survivor of several relegation scrapes (West Ham in 1995 and 1997 as well as Portsmouth in 2006), promised to field a full-strength side. More importantly, Fulham had never recorded three consecutive victories in the Premier League, much less three consecutive away wins. Fulham's fans travelled to Fratton Park expecting a tense final-day and they were not disappointed. In fact, with 15 minutes to play, Fulham would again have been relegated had the scores remained the same, with Birmingham and Reading leading comfortably. Kamara, however, earned Fulham a free-kick with 76 minutes played, and Bullard's delivery found Danny Murphy, who headed home the decisive goal, sparking manic celebrations from the travelling fans. Hodgson had ensured survival against all odds, breaking several club records in the process and cementing his place in Fulham folklore.

After Fulham's relegation escape, Roy Hodgson spoke of the need to ensure Fulham never found themselves in such a precarious position again. He struck early during the summer transfer window to claim the signing of experienced Australian goalkeeper Mark Schwarzer on a free transfer from Middlesbrough on 22 May 2008. On 28 May 2008, the club announced that captain and club legend Brian McBride would not renew his contract and would be returning to Major League Soccer to play for the Chicago Fire. On 12 June, Fulham added the signing of Andranik Teymourian to its summer acquisitions. The 25-year-old Armenian-Iranian defensive midfielder has played most recently for Bolton and the Iran national team. Zoltán Gera was also added to the squad earlier in the same month, after turning down a new contract with newly promoted West Brom. In early July, Toni Kallio, whom Hodgson had signed on loan in January, signed a full contract with the club. On 15 July, Fulham announced the joint signing of Bobby Zamora and John Paintsil from London rivals West Ham.

Next followed the saga of Andrew Johnson, in which it was reported in the press on 29 June that Johnson (from Premier League rivals Everton) would be joining immediately for up to £12 million. The transfer eventually happened more than a week later and at fees rising to almost £13 million, then becoming the second most expensive signing in Fulham's history, after Steve Marlet.

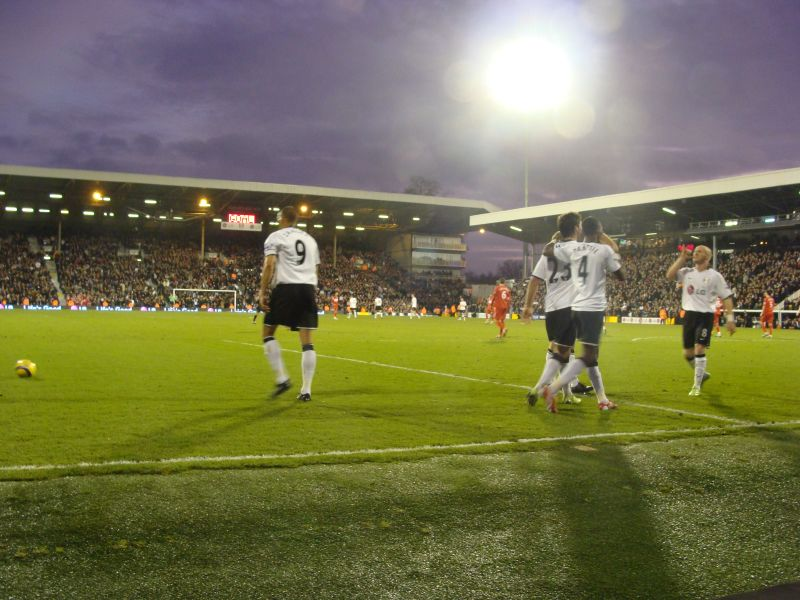
Clint Dempsey (23), John Paintsil (4), and Andrew Johnson celebrate a goal against Middlesbrough.

Fulham's start to the season was not fantastic, falling 2–1 defeat away to Hull City. Two home games in quick succession, however, saw them record a surprise 1–0 victory over Arsenal as well as a 2–1 win against Bolton. They also beat Leicester City in the League Cup, but it was a nervy affair for Fulham, who won 3–2 after being 2–1 down with seven minutes to play, Danny Murphy scoring the winner in stoppage time. Four successive defeats, three of which were in the League to Blackburn, West Ham] and West Brom, saw Fulham slide down the table; the other defeat, away to Burnley, saw them go out of the League Cup.

Two draws against Sunderland and Portsmouth helped to stop the rot, and a 2–0 home win against Wigan was crucial. Fulham then somehow contrived to lose away to Everton, but they rectified this by defeating both Newcastle and Tottenham at Craven Cottage. The win against Spurs was particularly noteworthy, as Roy Hodgson's side became the first to beat Tottenham under their new manager Harry Redknapp. Two 0–0 draws away to Liverpool and Aston Villa saw them rise to tenth in the table, already picking up over half their points tally of last season. Their 1–1 draw at home with Manchester City, followed by their 0–0 draw away at Stoke City mean that they are now unbeaten in six matches. Following the Stoke match, Fulham had a very comfortable 3–0 win against Boro.

Despite not winning either of their next two fixtures, the Christmas period was a satisfactory one for Fulham: on Boxing Day, they drew 0–0 away to Tottenham (the year before they had lost 5–1 in the same fixture on the same day), and two days later they snatched a dramatic draw at home to their local rivals Chelsea, with both goals coming from American Clint Dempsey. This saw them cement their place in mid-table, where they still remain at ninth position in the third week of March 2009, a month in which they have had mixed results, losing 1–2 to lowly ranked Blackburn and 0–1 to Hull City, but sensationally prevailing 2–0 on 21 March 2009 at Craven Cottage against Premier League defending champions and 2008–09 leaders Manchester United, who had two players, Paul Scholes and Wayne Rooney, sent off. The goals for Fulham were scored by Danny Murphy and Zoltán Gera. Earlier in the season, the team reached the quarter-finals of the FA Cup, eventually losing at home to Manchester United.

The following season saw Fulham achieve its greatest success reaching the 2009-10 Europa League Final losing to Atlético Madrid 2–1 after extra time. The club also finished 12th in the Premier League that season, resulting in Roy Hodgson being voted the LMA Manager of the Year.

== 2010–present: Ups and downs ==
On 29 July 2010, Mark Hughes succeeded Hodgson, signing a two-year contract with the club. But Hughes resigned after only one season on 2 June 2011. Martin Jol replaced Hughes as manager on a two-year deal. Shahid Khan took over as chairman in July 2013. Since then the club has had a succession of managers with Martin Jol being quickly replaced by René Meulensteen and other managers including Felix Magath, and temporary roles for Kit Symons and Peter Grant. This upheaval resulted in a spell back in the Championship. It was not until Khan appointed Slaviša Jokanović that Fulham started to improve and he took them back to the Premier League in 2017–18. However, Jokanović was sacked in November 2018 after a poor start to the season and replaced with former Leicester manager Claudio Ranieri. But the Italian was unable to turn things around and was replaced in February 2019 by coach Scott Parker as caretaker manager. Parker could not save Fulham and they were relegated back to the Championship at the end of the 2018–19 season. In his first full season as manager, Parker led the club straight back to the Premier League after defeating Brentford 2–1 in the 2020 Championship play-off final.
