= 1959–60 in Scottish football =

Division One champions
- Heart of Midlothian

Division Two champions
- St Johnstone

Scottish Cup winners
- Rangers

League Cup winners
- Heart of Midlothian

Junior Cup winners
- St Andrews United

Teams in Europe
- Rangers

Scotland national team
- 1960 BHC

The 1959–60 season was the 87th season of competitive football in Scotland and the 63rd season of the Scottish Football League.

== Scottish League Division One ==
Pos	Team	Pld	W	D	L	GF	GA	GR	Pts	Qualification or relegation
1	Heart of Midlothian (C)	34	23	8	3	102	51	2.000	54	Qualified for the European Cup
2	Kilmarnock	34	24	2	8	67	45	1.489	50	
3	Rangers	34	17	8	9	72	38	1.895	42	Qualified for the Cup Winners' Cup
4	Dundee	34	16	10	8	70	49	1.429	42	
5	Motherwell	34	16	8	10	71	61	1.164	40	
6	Clyde	34	15	9	10	77	69	1.116	39	
7	Hibernian	34	14	7	13	106	85	1.247	35	Invited for the Inter-Cities Fairs Cup
8	Ayr United	34	14	6	14	65	73	0.890	34	
9	Celtic	34	12	9	13	73	59	1.237	33	
10	Partick Thistle	34	14	4	16	54	78	0.692	32	
11	Raith Rovers	34	14	3	17	64	62	1.032	31	
12	Third Lanark	34	13	4	17	75	83	0.904	30	
13	Dunfermline Athletic	34	10	9	15	72	80	0.900	29	
14	St Mirren	34	11	6	17	78	86	0.907	28	
15	Aberdeen	34	11	6	17	54	72	0.750	28	
16	Airdrieonians	34	11	6	17	56	80	0.700	28	
17	Stirling Albion (R)	34	7	8	19	55	72	0.764	22	Relegated to the Second Division
18	Arbroath (R)	34	4	7	23	38	106	0.358	15	Relegated to the Second Division

Source: RSSSF
(C) Champions; (R) Relegated

Champions: Hearts
Relegated: Stirling Albion, Arbroath

== Scottish League Division Two ==
Pos	Team	Pld	W	D	L	GF	GA	GD	Pts	Promotion or relegation
1	St Johnstone	36	24	5	7	87	47	+40	53	Promotion to the 1960–61 First Division
2	Dundee United	36	22	6	8	90	45	+45	50	Promotion to the 1960–61 First Division
3	Queen of the South	36	21	7	8	94	52	+42	49	
4	Hamilton Academical	36	21	6	9	91	62	+29	48	
5	Stenhousemuir	36	20	4	12	86	67	+19	44	
6	Dumbarton	36	18	7	11	67	53	+14	43	
7	Montrose	36	19	5	12	60	52	+8	43	
8	Falkirk	36	15	9	12	77	43	+34	39	
9	Berwick Rangers	36	16	5	15	62	55	+7	37	
10	Albion Rovers	36	14	8	14	71	78	−7	36	
11	Queen's Park	36	17	2	17	65	79	−14	36	
12	Brechin City	36	14	6	16	66	66	0	34	
13	Alloa Athletic	36	13	5	18	70	85	−15	31	
14	Morton	36	10	8	18	67	79	−12	28	
15	East Stirlingshire	36	10	8	18	68	82	−14	28	
16	Forfar Athletic	36	10	8	18	53	84	−31	28	
17	Stranraer	36	10	3	23	53	79	−26	23	
18	East Fife	36	7	6	23	50	87	−37	20	
19	Cowdenbeath	36	6	2	28	42	124	−82	14	

Source: "1959-1960 Second Division - SPFL Archive". SPFL (in Malay).

Promoted: St Johnstone, Dundee United

== Cup honours ==
Competition	Winner	Score	Runner-up
Scottish Cup 1959–60	Rangers	2 – 0	Kilmarnock
League Cup 1959–60	Heart of Midlothian	2 – 1	Third Lanark
Junior Cup	St Andrews United	3 – 1	Greenock Juniors

== Other honours ==
=== National ===
Competition	Winner	Score	Runner-up
Scottish Qualifying Cup – North	Keith	7 – 5 *	Buckie Thistle
Scottish Qualifying Cup – South	Duns	9 – 6 *	Peebles Rovers

=== County ===
Competition	Winner	Score	Runner-up
Aberdeenshire Cup	Keith		
Ayrshire Cup	Kilmarnock	3 – 2 *	Ayr United
East of Scotland Shield	Hibernian	3 – 2	Hearts
Fife Cup	Dunfermline Athletic	2 – 2 * ‡	Raith Rovers
Forfarshire Cup	Dundee	3 – 2	Forfar Athletic
Glasgow Cup	Rangers	2 – 1	Partick Thistle
Lanarkshire Cup	Motherwell	3 – 1	Hamilton
Renfrewshire Cup	St Mirren	5 – 0 *	Morton
Stirlingshire Cup	Alloa Athletic	2 – 2 †	Falkirk

^{*} – aggregate over two legs
† – replay (won on corners)
‡ – trophy shared

=== Highland League ===
Top Three
Pos	Team	Pld	W	D	L	GF	GA	GD	Pts
1	Elgin City	28	19	4	5	90	54	+36	42
2	Inverness Caledonian	28	17	6	5	96	61	+35	40
3	Keith	28	18	3	7	66	35	+31	39

== Scotland national team ==
Date	Venue	Opponents	Score	Competition	Scotland scorer(s)
3 October 1959	Windsor Park, Belfast (A)	Northern Ireland	4–0	BHC	Graham Leggat, John Hewie (pen.), John White, George Mulhall
4 November 1959	Hampden Park, Glasgow (H)	Wales	1–1	BHC	Graham Leggat
9 April 1960	Hampden Park, Glasgow (H)	England	1–1	BHC	Graham Leggat
4 May 1960	Hampden Park, Glasgow (H)	Poland	2–3	Friendly	Denis Law, Ian St. John
29 May 1960	Prater Stadium, Vienna (A)	Austria	1–4	Friendly	Dave Mackay
5 June 1960	Népstadion, Budapest (A)	Hungary	3–3	Friendly	William Hunter, George Herd, Alex Young
8 June 1960	19 Mayis Stadium, Ankara (A)	Turkey	2–4	Friendly	Eric Caldow (pen.), Alex Young

1960 British Home Championship – Joint winners with England and Wales

Key:

- (H) = Home match
- (A) = Away match
- BHC = British Home Championship
