= Ally Riddle =

Scottish footballer

Personal information
- Full name: Alastair Riddle
- Date of birth: 7 June 1941 (age 85)
- Place of birth: Arbroath, Scotland
- Position: Winger

Youth career
- Arbroath Lads Club

Senior career*
Years	Team	Apps	(Gls)
1959–1962	Montrose		
1962–1963	Dundee United	4	(0)
1963–1967	Montrose		
- * Club domestic league appearances and goals

Alastair Riddle (born 7 June 1941) is a Scottish former footballer who played as a winger. Beginning his career in 1959 with Montrose, Riddle was transferred to Dundee United in 1962 but made just four appearances for the club, returning to Montrose shortly after. Riddle spent four years at Montrose during his second spell before retiring at the end of the 1966-67 season.

After retiring, Riddle – who never played full-time – worked as an electrical engineer before running his own television business. He is now retired.
