= 1957–58 British Home Championship =

Tournament details
- Host country: England, Ireland, Scotland and Wales
- Dates: 19 October 1957 – 19 April 1958
- Teams: 4

Final positions
- Champions: England; Ireland

Tournament statistics
- Matches played: 6
- Goals scored: 19 (3.17 per match)
- Top scorer(s): (England) Johnny Haynes (England) Derek Kevan (Northern Ireland) Billy Simpson (2 each)

The 1957–58 British Home Championship was a football tournament played between the British Home Nations during the 1957–58 season. The competition was marred by the Munich air disaster on 6 February 1958, when an aircraft carrying the Manchester United football team home from a European Cup match in Belgrade crashed at the Munich-Riem airport on take-off. Eight players and fifteen other people, including an array of senior coaches, officials and sports journalists, were killed and another nineteen seriously injured. Three of the dead, Roger Byrne, Tommy Taylor and Duncan Edwards were experienced England team members while Jackie Blanchflower, an Ireland international, was left permanently disabled. Several other international footballers were also injured more or less severely. This tragedy rather subdued the tournament culmination two months later, although the England team did secure a cathartic 4–0 victory in Glasgow over the Scots with one of the goals coming from Bobby Charlton, who had been injured in the Munich crash.

The tournament itself was shared by England and Ireland after weak performances by Scotland and Wales in their games. While Scotland and Ireland played out a 1–1 draw in their opener, England began well, beating the Welsh 4–0 in Cardiff. The second round of matches however changed the tournament's direction as Ireland beat England in London in a surprising overturn of form. The match was very close, the Irish only winning 3–2, one of the English goals coming from Duncan Edwards. Scotland and Wales meanwhile were both unable to take advantage of England's discomfort, drawing 1–1. Before the final matches, the season was permanently disfigured by the Munich disaster. Wales and Ireland again struggled to a 1–1 draw, denying the Irish a rare undisputed title while England, with a team containing several young and inexperienced players, achieved an impressive 4–0 victory over the Scots in Glasgow to take their share of the tournament.

The competition was also intended to have been a good indicator of form going into the 1958 FIFA World Cup in Sweden, which all four Home Nations had reached through separate qualifying groups. The disaster however made the tournament a poor indicator and so it proved, England and Scotland unable to progress from the group stage, England still suffering from the loss of so many key players. Wales and Northern Ireland progressed from their groups in impressive form but were unable to sustain their momentum, Wales going down to a Pelé goal in a hard fought match to eventual winners Brazil, while the Irish lost 4–0 in the Quarter-Final to the France of Just Fontaine.

== Table ==
Team	Pld	W	D	L	GF	GA	GD	Pts
England (C)	3	2	0	1	10	3	+7	4
Ireland (C)	3	1	2	0	5	4	+1	4
Scotland	3	0	2	1	2	6	−4	2
Wales	3	0	2	1	2	6	−4	2

Rules for classification: 1) points. The points system worked as follows: 2 points for a win and 1 point for a draw.
(C) Co-champions

== Results ==
19 October 1957

Wales	0 – 4	England
		Johnny Haynes 2, Tom Finney, Own goal

Ninian Park, Cardiff

5 October 1957

Ireland	1 – 1	Scotland
Billy Bingham		Graham Leggat

Windsor Park, Belfast

13 November 1957

Scotland	1 – 1	Wales
Bobby Collins		Terry Medwin

Hampden Park, Glasgow

6 November 1957

England	2 – 3	Ireland
Alan A'Court, Duncan Edwards		Jimmy McIlroy, Billy Simpson, Sammy McCrory

Wembley Stadium, London

16 April 1958

Wales	1 – 1	Ireland
Ron Hewitt		Billy Simpson

Ninian Park, Cardiff

19 April 1958

Scotland	0 – 4	England
		Derek Kevan 2, Bobby Charlton, Bryan Douglas

Hampden Park, Glasgow
