= Tosh Chamberlain =

English footballer (1934–2021)

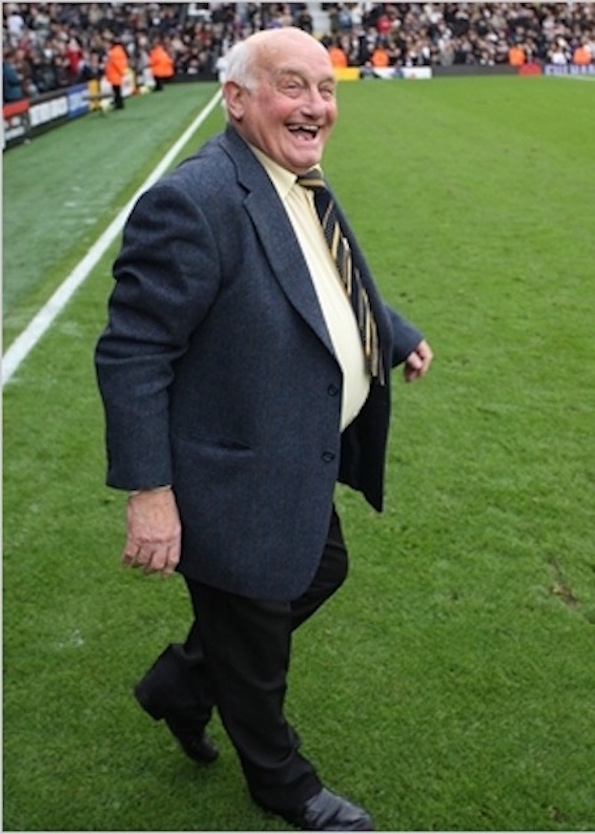
- Chamberlain at Craven Cottage in 2003

Personal information
- Full name: Trevor Chamberlain
- Date of birth: 11 July 1934
- Place of birth: London, England
- Date of death: 10 January 2021 (aged 86)
- Position: Forward

Senior career*
Years	Team	Apps	(Gls)
1954–1965	Fulham	187	(59)
1965–1966	Dover Athletic		
1966	Gravesend & Northfleet		
- * Club domestic league appearances and goals

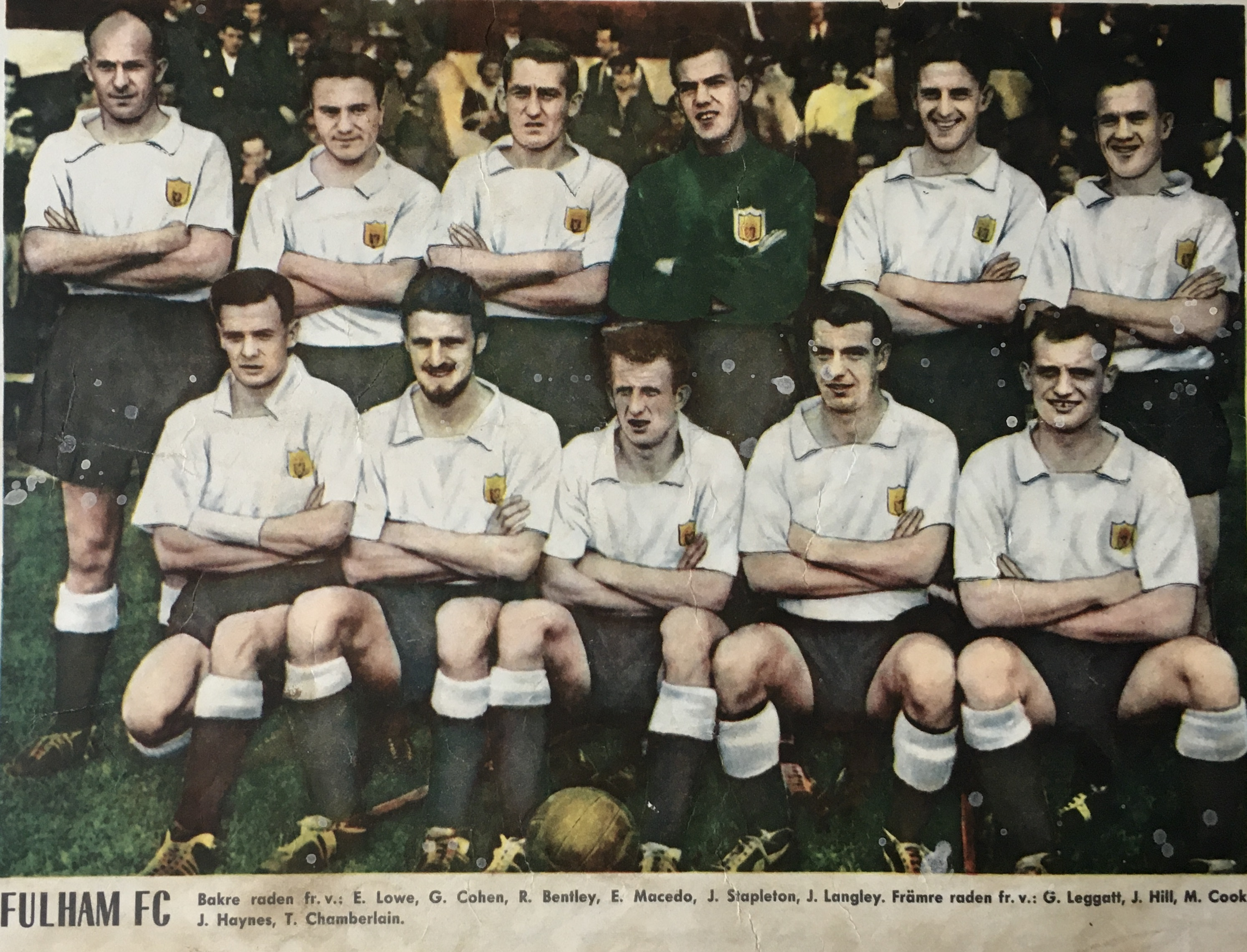
Fulham F.C. at 1958 with following players, from left standing: Eddie Lowe, George Cohen, Roy Bentley, Tony Macedo, Joe Stapleton, Jim Langley; front row: Graham Leggat, J. Hill, M. Cook, Johnny Haynes and Tosh Chamberlain.

Trevor "Tosh" Chamberlain (11 July 1934 – 10 January 2021) was an English professional footballer. He played at outside left.

Chamberlain began his career as a youth player with Middlesex and London, and gained youth international honours for his country. In 1952 he joined Fulham, for whom he made 204 first-team appearances, scoring 64 goals, before leaving for Dover Athletic in 1965. He finished his professional career at Gravesend and Northfleet.

== Career ==
Chamberlain was born in Kings Cross, London, and as a youth joined the local boys club The Mary Ward Settlement, in Bloomsbury, where he played in the London Federation of Boys Club Leagues. He was also a schoolboy international before signing for Fulham. After spending his youth career in London and Middlesex, Chamberlain signed for Fulham in 1954, encouraging his schoolboy friend Johnny Haynes to join him there. He made his debut in November that year. Two years later, after his National Service, in Chamberlain's first team game in 1954, with his first kick in the very first minute, he scored a goal against Lincoln City. Next season, he even postponed his wedding day in order to play against Newcastle United in pouring rain in the fourth round of the FA Cup. Chamberlain scored a hat trick, but Fulham lost 5–4. His last game was in a FA Cup third-round replay at Millwall on 11 January 1965.

== After retirement ==
After retiring from football, Chamberlain worked for Richmond Park authorities in the 1980s and '90s. He also worked as a sports instructor at Elliott School in Putney. He was frequently seen at Craven Cottage and continued to support Fulham.

Chamberlain died on 10 January 2021, aged 86.

== Career statistics ==
Appearances and goals by club, season and competition
Club	Season	League			FA Cup		League Cup		Europe		Total	
Club	Season	Division	Apps	Goals	Apps	Goals	Apps	Goals	Apps	Goals	Apps	Goals
Fulham	1954–55	Second Division	6	1	0	0	0	0	–		6	1
Fulham	1955–56	Second Division	21	11	1	3	0	0	–		22	14
Fulham	1956–57	Second Division	39	15	2	0	0	0	–		41	15
Fulham	1957–58	Second Division	27	13	6	1	0	0	–		33	14
Fulham	1958–59	Second Division	24	7	0	0	0	0	–		24	7
Fulham	1959–60	First Division	27	6	2	1	0	0	–		29	7
Fulham	1960–61	First Division	11	1	1	0	1	0	–		13	1
Fulham	1961–62	First Division	14	2	0	0	2	0	–		16	2
Fulham	1962–63	First Division	3	0	1	0	6	1	–		4	0
Fulham	1963–64	First Division	7	2	0	0	0	0	–		7	2
Fulham	1964–65	First Division	8	1	1	0	0	0	–		9	1
Career total			187	59	13	5	4	0	0	0	204	64
