= George Cohen =

English footballer (1939–2022)

George Cohen MBE
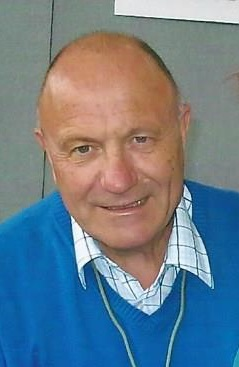
- Cohen in 2007

Personal information
- Full name: George Reginald Cohen
- Date of birth: 22 October 1939
- Place of birth: Fulham, London, England
- Date of death: 23 December 2022 (aged 83)
- Place of death: Mayfield, East Sussex, England
- Height: 5 ft 10 in (1.78 m)
- Position: Right-back

Senior career*
Years	Team	Apps	(Gls)
1956–1969	Fulham	459	(6)

International career
1959–1963	England U23	8	(0)
1964–1967	England	37	(0)
Medal record
Representing England
Men's football
FIFA World Cup
Winner	1966 England
- * Club domestic league appearances and goals

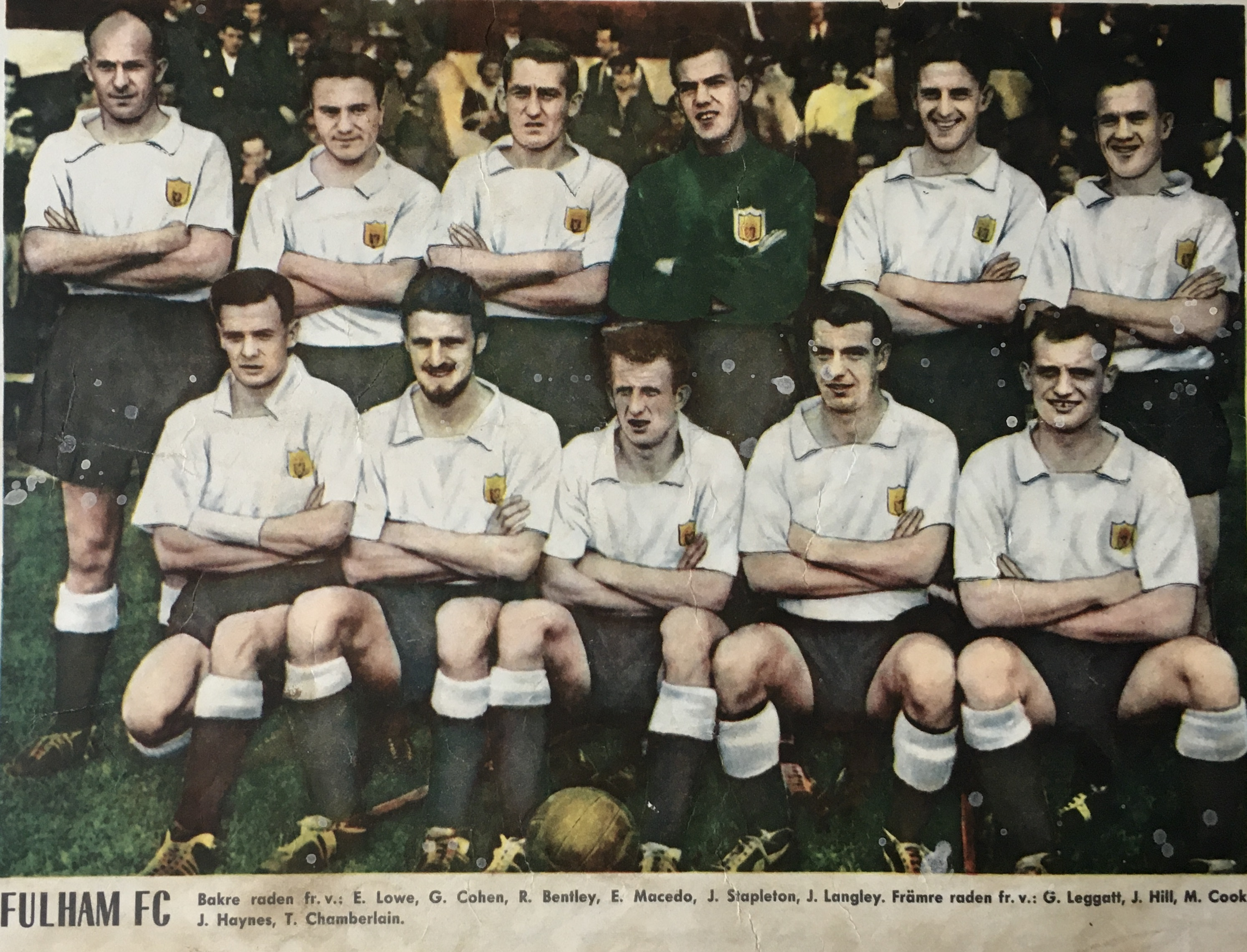
Fulham F.C. at 1958 with following players, from left standing: Eddie Lowe, George Cohen, Roy Bentley, Tony Macedo, Joe Stapleton, Jim Langley; front row: Graham Leggat, J. Hill, M. Cook, Johnny Haynes and Tosh Chamberlain.

George Reginald Cohen MBE (22 October 1939 – 23 December 2022) was an English professional footballer who played as a right-back. He spent his entire professional career with Fulham and won the 1966 FIFA World Cup with England. He is a member of the English Football Hall of Fame and was the uncle of rugby union World Cup winner Ben Cohen.

== Playing career ==
=== Fulham ===
Cohen was a one-club footballer, joining Fulham professionally in 1956 and remaining there until retirement through injury 13 years later in March 1969. Fulham had been relegated to the Second Division the season before he retired as a player and did not return to the top flight for 33 years. He ended his career with 459 appearances for the club, a figure surpassed by only five other players in Fulham's history. As a full-back he also managed to score six League goals for Fulham.

=== England ===
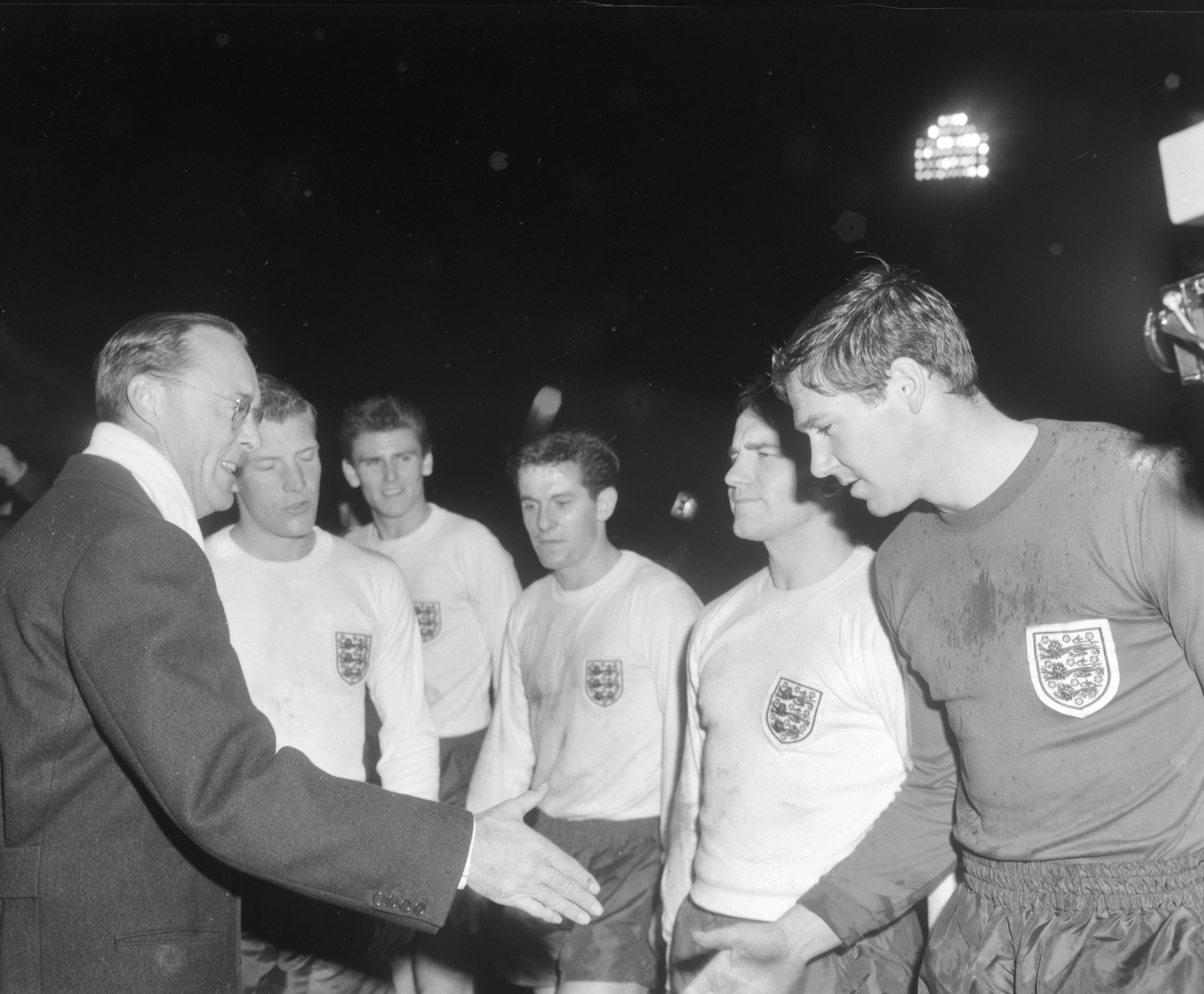
Cohen in December 1964, standing next to Tony Waiters, who is about to shake hands with Prince Bernhard of Lippe-Biesterfeld

Blackpool's Jimmy Armfield played in the 1962 World Cup in Chile. In April 1964, however, Armfield won his 41st cap in a 1–0 defeat to an Alan Gilzean of Scotland goal at Hampden Park. England coach Alf Ramsey duly tried out Cohen for his international debut a month later in a 2–1 win over Uruguay. With Armfield suffering an injury – badly timed with the World Cup imminent – Cohen went on to play in 21 of the next 23 internationals. Armfield managed two more caps in preparation for the 1966 tournament after regaining his fitness, but Cohen was Ramsey's first choice by the time the England-hosted competition started.

Ramsey's team played without conventional wingers, allowing extra strength in midfield and relying on young, stamina-based players like Martin Peters and Alan Ball to drift from centre to flank and back again as required. When these players were occupied in more central positions, or chasing high up the flank and needing support, attacking full-backs like Cohen proved their worth.

After England's win over Argentina in the quarter-finals, Cohen was featured in a photograph in which Ramsey prevented him from swapping shirts as customary with an opponent – Ramsey had referred to the Argentine players as "animals" for their fouling and gamesmanship during the match.

Three days later, one of Cohen's overlapping runs and near-post passes contributed to Charlton's semi-final clincher as England edged out Portugal.

As vice-captain in the final against West Germany Cohen won his 30th cap. He blocked the last-minute Lothar Emmerich free-kick that subsequently found its way across the England six-yard box for Wolfgang Weber to equalise 2–2. England won 4–2 in extra-time.

Cohen played seven of the next eight internationals. His 37th and final England appearance was a 2–0 win over Northern Ireland at Wembley on 22 November 1967. Although he never scored for England, Cohen was regarded as "England's greatest right-back" due to his skilled attacking intent. He was the first of England's 1966 XI to retire from international football.

== Coaching career ==
Following his retirement, Cohen coached the Fulham youth team and the England under-23 team for a time. He also briefly managed non-league Tonbridge, who he led to victory in the Kent Senior Cup in 1974–75.

== Accolades ==
Manchester United's George Best described Cohen as "the best full-back I ever played against," while Alf Ramsey called Cohen "England's greatest right-back". Cohen also bears the distinction of being the only Fulham player to have won a World Cup winner's medal while at the Cottagers.

Cohen was awarded the MBE in 2000, along with four teammates from 1966 after a campaign from sections of the media who were surprised that the quintet had never been officially recognised for their part in England's success. The others were Ball, Wilson, Nobby Stiles and Roger Hunt.

In October 2016, a statue of Cohen was unveiled at Craven Cottage by club chairman Shahid Khan to commemorate their former player and mark the 50th anniversary of the England World Cup win. Cohen attended the ceremony. Hammersmith & Fulham Council announced that it was making the former footballer a freeman of the borough.

In a documentary on Channel 4 to find the greatest England XI, Cohen was given the right-back spot by the public, ahead of Phil Neal and Gary Neville. He was one of four veterans of the 1966 team to make it.

His attacking intent has been regarded as an encouragement for modern day full-backs as well.

== Later life ==
In 2003, Cohen published George Cohen: My Autobiography. (ISBN 9780755313976). He was a frequent guest at functions around the country as well as at Craven Cottage raising money for cancer charities. He hosted a luncheon before every home game at Craven Cottage in the George Cohen Restaurant.

In 2010, Cohen criticized changes to the design of footballs following the intense criticism of the Adidas Jabulani used at the 2010 World Cup. He was quoted: "Designers have constantly tried to create more goals by using lighter and lighter balls. It was thought they would fly further and everyone loves to see a 30-yard screamer bend into the top corner. But things have gone too far."

Cohen was also known for being vocal in his demands for a public inquiry into dementia in football, following research that suggested ex-professionals were more than three times at risk of getting the condition.

== Personal life and death ==
Cohen was born and raised in Fulham, London, where his Irish-born mother, Catherine (née Gibbs), was a stores manager at the local Lots Road power station and his father, Louis (known as Harry) Cohen, was a gas fitter. Though of Jewish heritage on his father's side, with some of his family originally from Ukraine, he was brought up in the Church of England. He married his wife Daphne in 1962. They had two sons.

He had a history of bowel cancer, being first diagnosed with the condition in 1976. He was ultimately declared cancer-free in 1990.

His nephew Ben Cohen is an English former rugby union player and Rugby World Cup winner with England in 2003.

Cohen died at home in Mayfield, East Sussex, on 23 December 2022, aged 83. He had recently suffered a stroke and also lived with chronic osteomyelitis He was known as one of the few "greatest one-trophy wonders", winning solely a World Cup winner's medal in his career.

== Career statistics ==
=== Club ===
Appearances and goals by club, season and competition
Club	Season	League			FA Cup		League Cup		Other		Total	
Club	Season	Division	Apps	Goals	Apps	Goals	Apps	Goals	Apps	Goals	Apps	Goals
Fulham	1956–57	Second Division	1	0	0	0	-	-	-	-	1	0
Fulham	1957–58	Second Division	26	0	7	0	-	-	-	-	33	0
Fulham	1958–59	Second Division	41	1	4	0	-	-	-	-	45	1
Fulham	1959–60	First Division	42	0	2	0	-	-	-	-	44	0
Fulham	1960–61	First Division	41	0	1	0	1	0	-	-	43	0
Fulham	1961–62	First Division	41	1	8	0	2	0	-	-	51	1
Fulham	1962–63	First Division	38	0	2	0	1	0	-	-	41	0
Fulham	1963–64	First Division	41	1	2	0	1	0	-	-	44	1
Fulham	1964–65	First Division	40	2	2	0	2	0	-	-	44	2
Fulham	1965–66	First Division	39	0	1	0	3	0	-	-	43	0
Fulham	1966–67	First Division	35	1	3	0	3	0	-	-	41	1
Fulham	1967–68	First Division	17	0	0	0	5	0	-	-	22	0
Fulham	1968–69	Second Division	6	0	1	0	0	0	-	-	7	0
Career total			408	6	33	0	18	0	-	-	459	6

== Honours ==
England

- FIFA World Cup: 1966
