= Joe Stapleton (footballer) =

English footballer

Personal information
- Full name: Joseph Edward Stapleton
- Date of birth: 27 June 1928
- Place of birth: Marylebone, England
- Date of death: 14 July 2005 (aged 77)
- Place of death: Twickenham, England
- Position: Centre half

Senior career*
Years	Team	Apps	(Gls)
- Uxbridge Town
1954–1960	Fulham	97	(2)
- Cambridge City
- * Club domestic league appearances and goals

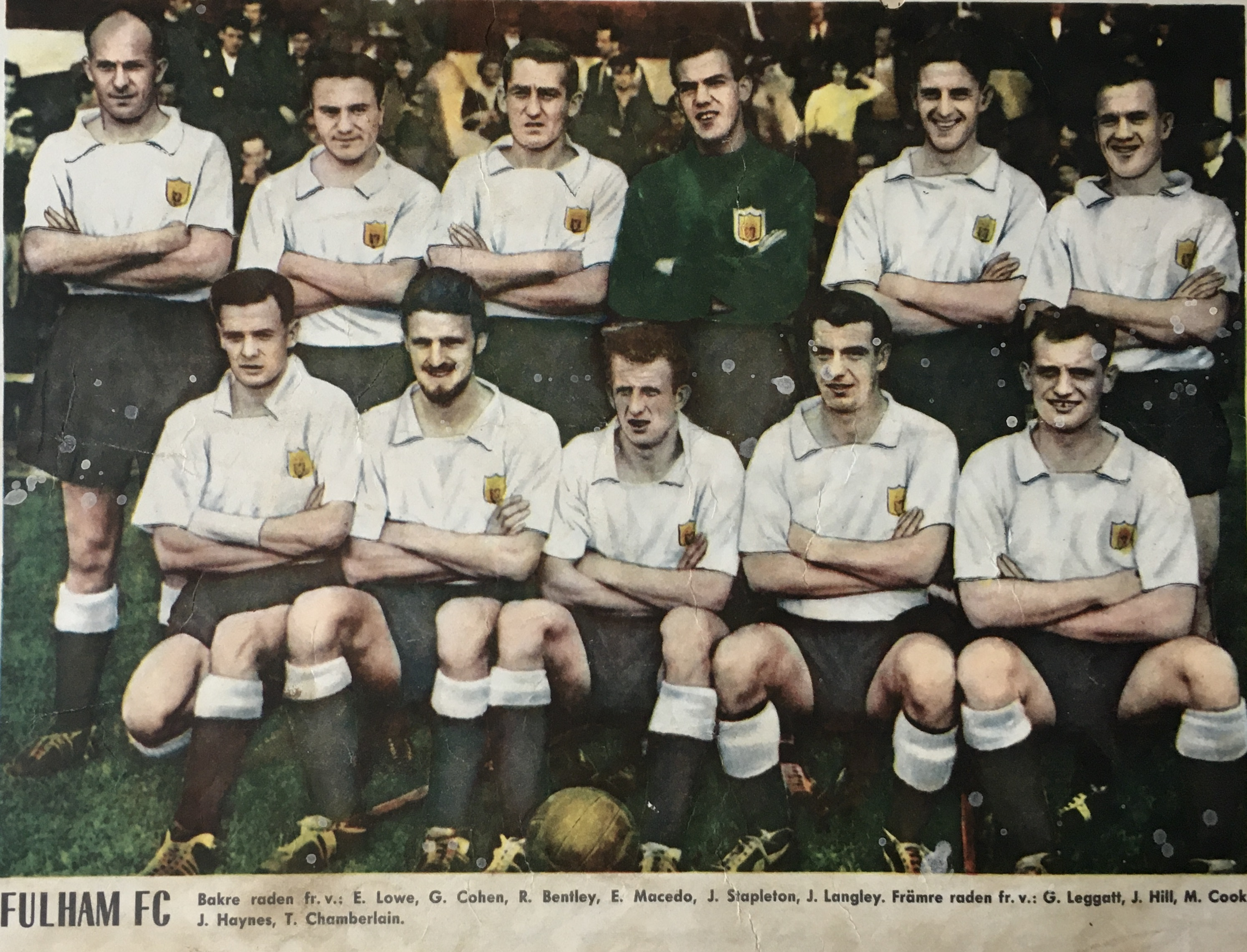
Fulham F.C. at 1958 with following players, from left standing: Eddie Lowe, George Cohen, Roy Bentley, Tony Macedo, Joe Stapleton, Jim Langley; front row: Graham Leggat, J. Hill, M. Cook, Johnny Haynes and Tosh Chamberlain.

Joseph Edward Stapleton (27 June 1928 – 14 July 2005) was an English professional footballer who played as a centre half for Uxbridge Town, Fulham and Cambridge City.
