= Tony Macedo =

Footballer (1938–2024)

Personal information
- Full name: Elliot Macedo
- Date of birth: 22 February 1938
- Place of birth: Gibraltar
- Date of death: 2024 (aged 86)
- Position: Goalkeeper

Youth career
- 1955–1957: Fulham

Senior career*
Years	Team	Apps	(Gls)
1955–1968	Fulham	346	(0)
1961	→ Montreal Concordia (loan)		
1968–1969	Colchester United	38	(0)
1969–1971	Durban City	35	(0)
1971–1973	Highlands Power	59	(0)

International career
1959–1961	England U23	10	(0)
- * Club domestic league appearances and goals

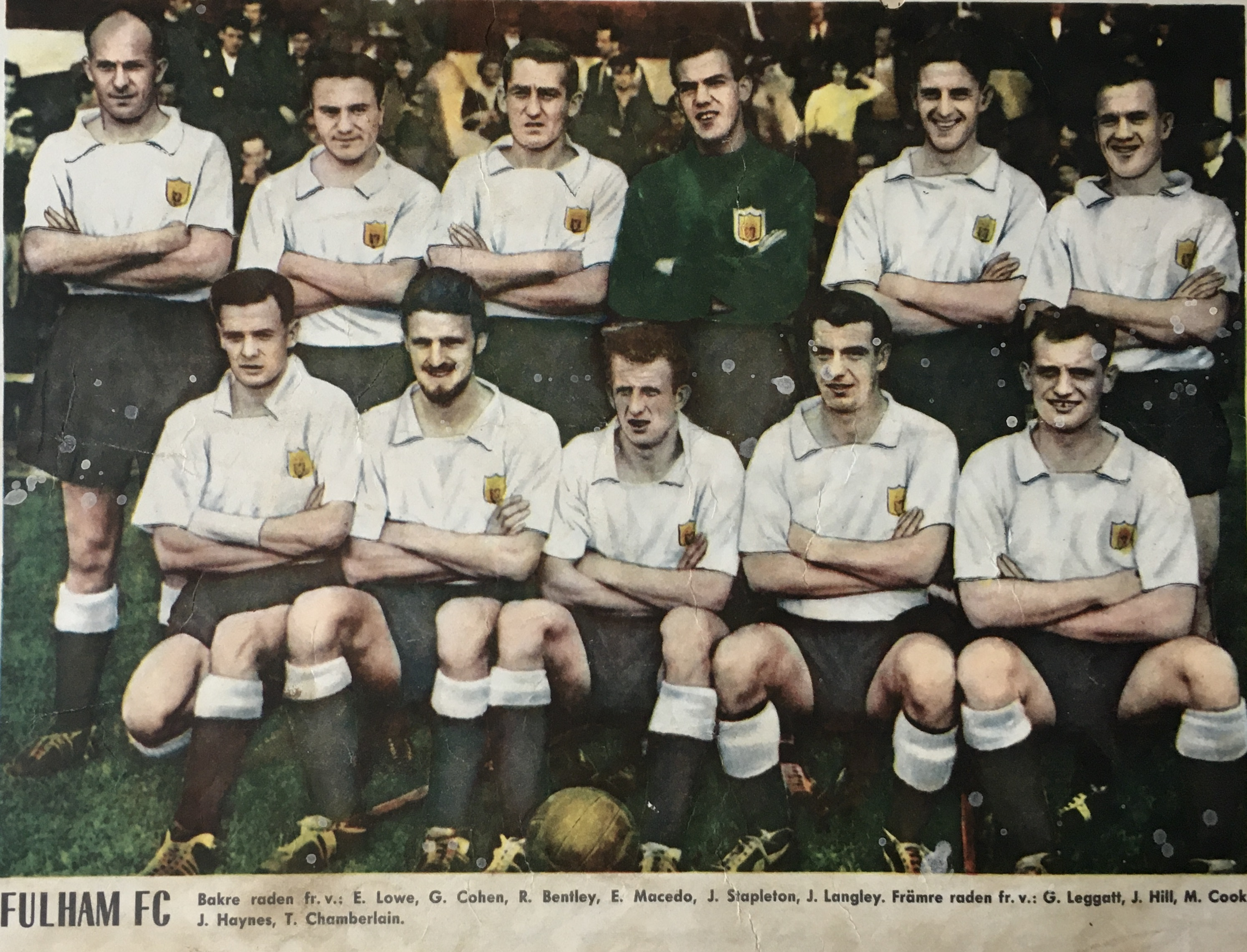
Fulham F.C. at 1958 with following players, from left standing: Eddie Lowe, George Cohen, Roy Bentley, Tony Macedo, Joe Stapleton, Jim Langley; front row: Graham Leggat, Jimmy Hill, M. Cook, Johnny Haynes and Tosh Chamberlain.

Elliot "Tony" Macedo (22 February 1938 – 2024) was a professional footballer who played as a goalkeeper, spending nearly his whole career at Fulham. He made 346 league appearances and played a total of 391 matches in all competitions. He ended his career in 1968 after suffering a string of injuries. Born in Gibraltar, he represented the England U23s.

== Career ==
Macedo was born in Gibraltar in 1938 to British Gibraltarian parents. Macedo joined Fulham as a youth team player in 1955. He made his debut for the first team in a match against Bristol City in December 1957. Following his debut he went on to establish himself as the club's number one goalkeeper. He was part of the side that reached the semi-final of the FA Cup in 1958 and 1962. In 1958, he played a crucial role in Fulham's successful promotion to the First Division. He played in each of Fulham's nine successive seasons in the First Division. A series of injuries, including a backpass from Tosh Chamberlain breaking his ribs, reduced his appearances towards the end of the decade.

Macedo spent one season at Colchester United, making 38 appearances, before retiring at the premature age of 31. He emigrated to South Africa, where he lived for the rest of his life. He was considered the "finest 'keeper never to win a full England cap", if it was not for his ineligibility, having been born in Gibraltar, who did not become members of UEFA until 2013 and remained unrecognised territory by FIFA until 2016.

He played on Fulham sides with George Cohen, Jim Langley, Alan Mullery, Bobby Robson, Rodney Marsh and Bedford Jezzard, as well as Fulham's greatest ever player Johnny Haynes.

== Death ==
In June 2024, Fulham announced that Macedo had died. He was survived by his wife Margaret, children and grandchildren.

== Honours ==
Fulham

- Football League Second Division runner-up: 1958–59
