= Eddie Lowe (footballer) =

English footballer and manager

Personal information
- Full name: Edward Lowe
- Date of birth: 11 July 1925
- Place of birth: Halesowen, England
- Date of death: 9 March 2009 (aged 83)
- Place of death: Nottingham, England
- Position: Wing half

Senior career*
Years	Team	Apps	(Gls)
1946–1950	Aston Villa	104	(3)
1950–1963	Fulham	473	(8)
1963–1965	Notts County	9	(0)
Total		586	(11)

International career
1947	England	3	(0)

Managerial career
- 1963–1965: Notts County
- * Club domestic league appearances and goals

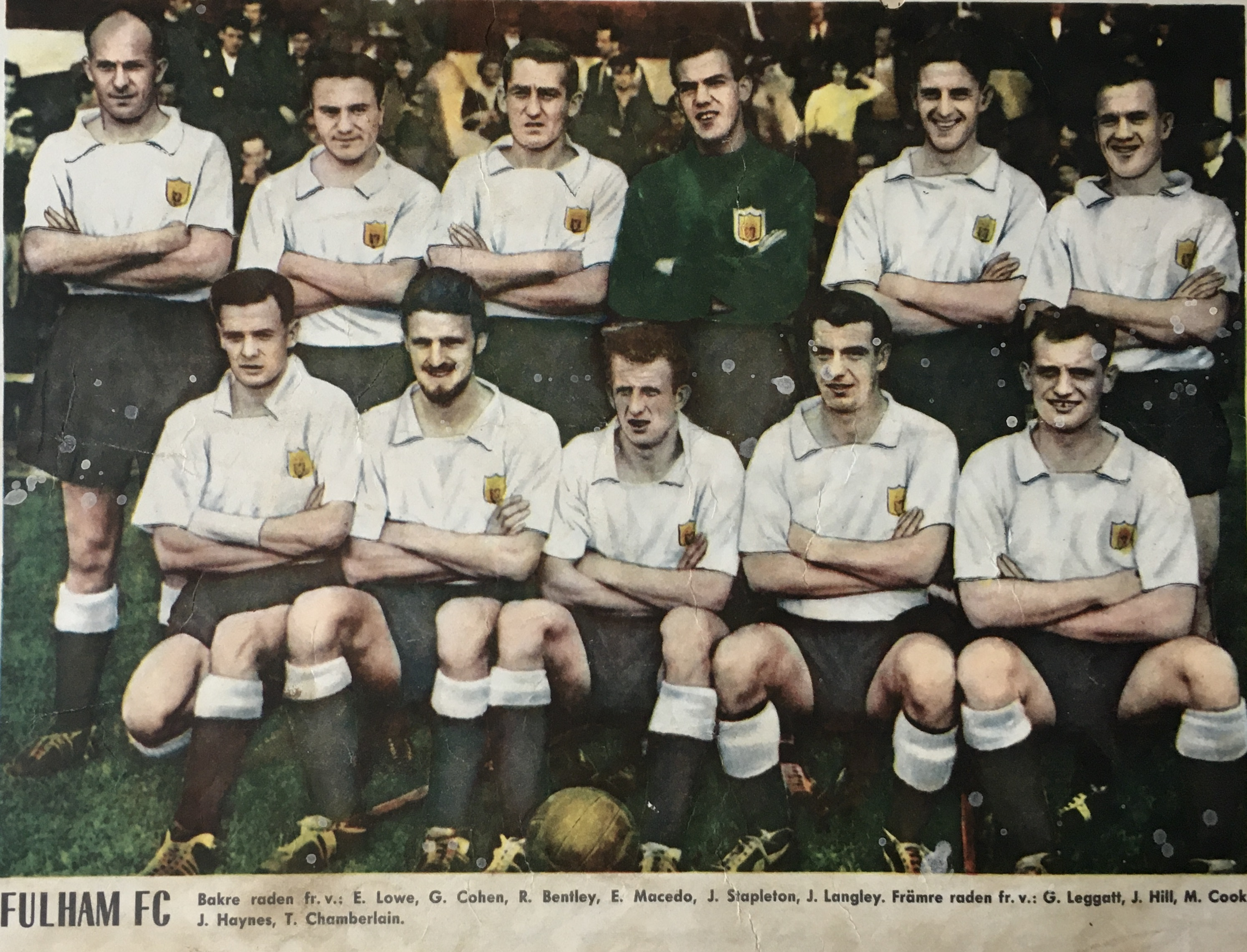
Fulham F.C. at 1958 with following players, from left standing: Eddie Lowe, George Cohen, Roy Bentley, Tony Macedo, Joe Stapleton, Jim Langley; front row: Graham Leggat, J. Hill, M. Cook, Johnny Haynes and Tosh Chamberlain.

Edward Lowe (11 July 1925 – 9 March 2009) was an English professional footballer who played for Aston Villa and Fulham, making the second-all-time club record appearances for Fulham of 511, behind Johnny Haynes, between 1950 and 1963. He was also an England international and later, the manager for Notts County. Lowe died on 9 March 2009 in Nottingham.
