= 1959–60 British Home Championship =

Tournament details
- Host country: England, Ireland, Scotland and Wales
- Dates: 3 October 1959 – 9 April 1960
- Teams: 4

Final positions
- Champions: England; Scotland; Wales

Tournament statistics
- Matches played: 6
- Goals scored: 18 (3 per match)
- Top scorer(s): (England) Billy Bingham (Scotland) Graham Leggat (Wales) Terry Medwin (2 each)

The 1959–60 British Home Championship football tournament was played by the British Home Nations throughout the 1959–60 season and was shared between three of the competing teams at the expense of Ireland. Football at the United Kingdom was at a low point in 1959 and 1960, following the failure of the national sides (except Wales and Ireland), to perform well in the 1958 FIFA World Cup two years before. A part of the problem involved the deaths of senior members of all four national sides at the Munich air disaster in early 1958. England had also suffered a further loss of confidence following poor form in a pre-season tour of the Americas, losing three games in a row to Brazil, Peru 4–1 and Mexico. An 8–1 victory over a weak United States in the final match did little to raise their spirits.

The title was shared between three teams who were unable to beat each other but all managed a victory over the hapless Irish. The Scots started well, with a 4–0 drubbing of their opponents in Belfast whilst the English and Welsh played out a tame draw. This set the tone for the tournament, with the Irish losing their subsequent matches with more respectable scorelines but still unable to gain a point. The Scots could not capitalise on their good start and were held by England and Wales in their subsequent matches whilst the Welsh took their draws and narrowly beat Ireland in their last match to claim their own third share of the title. Goal difference was not at this stage used to differentiate between the teams. if it had been, Scotland would have won with Wales and England again tied for second.

== Table ==
| Team | Pld | W | D | L | GF | GA | GD | Pts |
|---|---|---|---|---|---|---|---|---|
| Scotland (C) | 3 | 1 | 2 | 0 | 6 | 2 | +4 | 4 |
| England (C) | 3 | 1 | 2 | 0 | 4 | 3 | +1 | 4 |
| Wales (C) | 3 | 1 | 2 | 0 | 5 | 4 | +1 | 4 |
| Ireland | 3 | 0 | 0 | 3 | 3 | 9 | −6 | 0 |

Rules for classification: 1) points. The points system worked as follows: 2 points for a win and 1 point for a draw.
(C) Co-champions

== Results ==
3 October 1959

| Ireland | 0–4 | Scotland |
|---|---|---|
| | | Leggat; Hewie (pen.); White; Mulhall |

Windsor Park, Belfast

17 October 1959

| Wales | 1–1 | England |
|---|---|---|
| Moore | | Greaves |

Ninian Park, Cardiff

4 November 1959

| Scotland | 1–1 | Wales |
|---|---|---|
| Leggat | | Charles |

Hampden Park, Glasgow

18 November 1959

| England | 2–1 | Ireland |
|---|---|---|
| Baker; Parry | | Bingham |

Wembley Stadium, London

6 April 1960

| Wales | 3–2 | Ireland |
|---|---|---|
| Medwin; Woosnam | | Bingham; Blanchflower |

Racecourse Ground, Wrexham

9 April 1960

| Scotland | 1–1 | England |
|---|---|---|
| Leggat | | Charlton (pen.) |

Hampden Park, Glasgow
