= Jim Langley =

English footballer (1929–2007)

Personal information
- Full name: Ernest James Langley
- Date of birth: 7 February 1929
- Place of birth: London, England
- Date of death: 9 December 2007 (aged 78)
- Place of death: London, England
- Position: Full-back

Senior career*
Years	Team	Apps	(Gls)
- Yiewsley
- Hounslow Town
- Uxbridge
- Hayes
- Brentford
- Ruislip
1948–1952	Guildford City	155	(7)
1952–1953	Leeds United	9	(3)
1953–1957	Brighton & Hove Albion	178	(16)
1957–1965	Fulham	356	(33)
1965–1967	Queens Park Rangers	87	(9)
1967–1971	Hillingdon Borough		
Total		785	(61)

International career
1958	England	3	(0)

Managerial career
- 1967–1971: Hillingdon Borough
- 1973–1975: Hillingdon Borough
- 1977: Dulwich Hamlet
- 1977–1978: Hillingdon Borough
- * Club domestic league appearances and goals

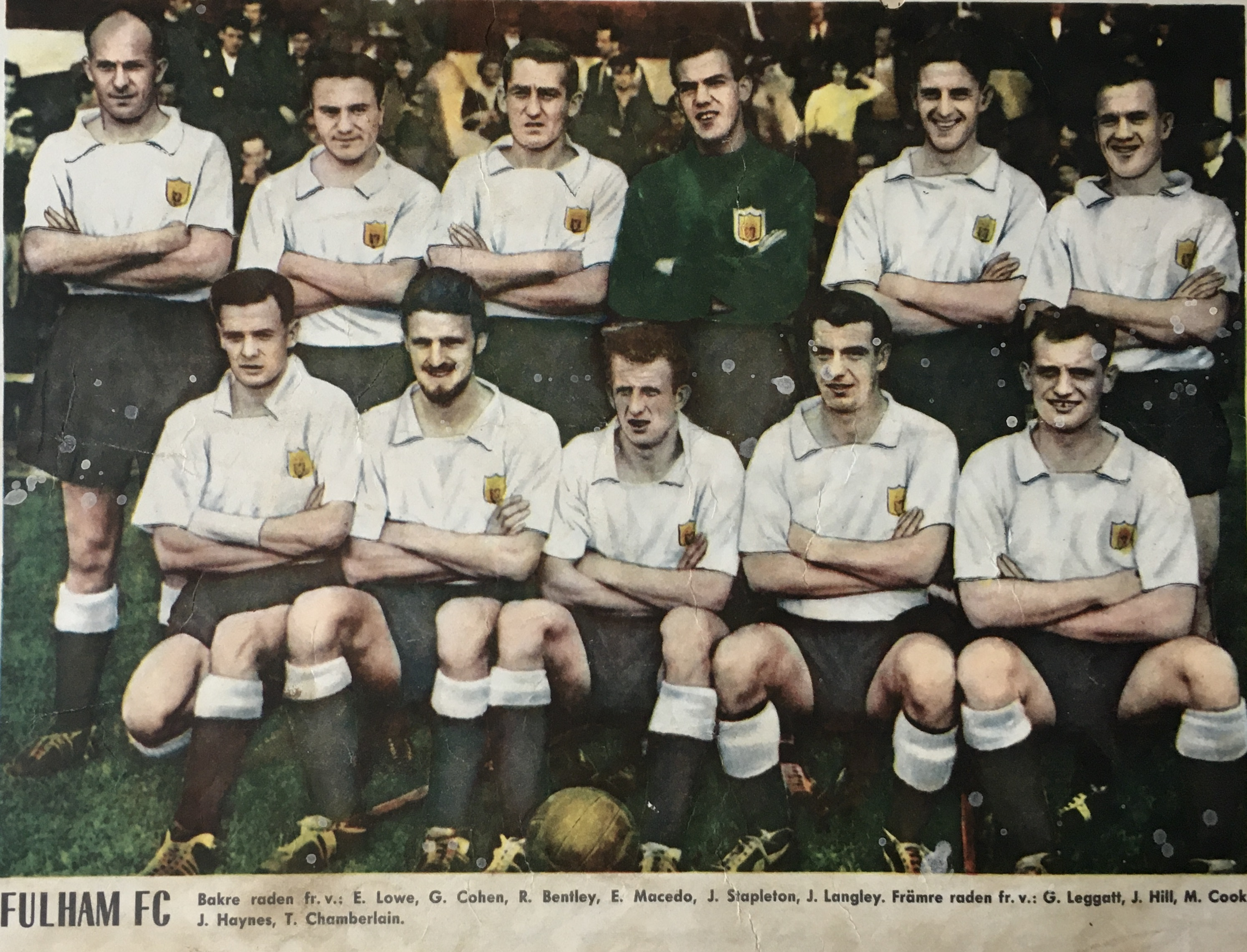
Fulham F.C. at 1958 with following players, from left standing: Eddie Lowe, George Cohen, Roy Bentley, Tony Macedo, Joe Stapleton, Jim Langley; front row: Graham Leggat, J. Hill, M. Cook, Johnny Haynes and Tosh Chamberlain.

Ernest James Langley (7 February 1929 – 9 December 2007) was an English professional footballer.

He was noted for his pacey, rampaging runs from the left full-back position and his long throw-ins. He is remembered particularly fondly by supporters of Fulham for his long service with the club during which he helped them achieve promotion to the First Division during the 1958–59 season; by Queens Park Rangers fans for featuring in the side which won the Third Division title and sensationally beat First Division West Bromwich Albion in the League Cup Final in the 1966–67 season and by non-league side Guildford City where he remains one of their most successful former players. Langley also enjoyed a short spell as an England international, playing three games for his country in 1958.

== Club career ==
=== Amateur ===
Langley started his football career as an amateur playing for a number of non-league sides in the London area whilst still a teenager. At the age of fourteen he was the youngest player to play for Yiewsley. His ability was soon attracting attention and in 1946 Langley was given his dream move – First Division side Brentford signing him when he was still only 17. Langley's stay with the Bees did not last long however - his height of 5 feet 9 inches apparently counting against him with manager Harry Curtis - and the Londoner was soon looking for another club.

As with many youngsters his age, Langley was called upon to do national service and it was while he was still in the army that Langley joined Guildford City in 1948. After a season playing with the Southern League side as an amateur, during which they narrowly avoided relegation, Langley turned professional in 1949.

=== Guildford City ===
Langley was a huge crowd favourite at Guildford City, helping them to two Southern League cup finals in 1951 and 1952 during his four seasons there. After the near catastrophic 1948–49 season he also helped the Surrey side to record a top ten finish in each of the following three seasons. It was hence with great reluctance that Guildford were forced to sell their prized asset to Second Division Leeds United for £2,000 in the summer of 1952 after slipping some £12,000 into debt. He was not forgotten by the club however and in the mid 1970s when Guildford City merged with Dorking FC and were forced to sell their Joseph's Road ground for housing, a Langley Close was created on the site in his honour

=== Leeds United ===
Langley's second shot at making it in the Football League was as unhappy as his first as Langley made only 9 appearances for Leeds during his one season there. Despite scoring on his debut and on two subsequent occasions in his nine appearances on the left wing, manager Major Frank Buckley preferred to play Elland Road stalwart Grenville Hair at Langley's preferred position of left back and Langley moved to Third Division (South) Brighton & Hove Albion in the summer of 1953.

=== Brighton and Hove Albion ===
Albion finally provided Langley with the opportunity to show his ability and he thrived at the south coast club during his four seasons there, helping them secure runners up position in the 1953–54 and 1955–56 seasons and captaining them for two years. He was selected to play for the Third Division South representative side in 1954–55 and 1956–57. Langley clearly felt he needed to prove his ability at a higher level, however and he agreed to a £12,000 move to Second Division Fulham in 1957.

=== Fulham ===
This move to Craven Cottage was arguably the making of Langley as he slotted well into Doug Livingstone's stylish side alongside the legendary midfielder Johnny Haynes. During Langley's eight seasons at the club he helped the Cottagers to the FA Cup semi finals in 1957–58 where they lost to Manchester United; and then to promotion back to the first division the following season. In 1959–60 the Cottagers secured their highest league position in the top flight ever as they finished 10th – a record not beaten until Chris Coleman helped the Cottagers to a ninth position finish in 2003–04. There were many highlights in Langley's career at Fulham but particularly picked out by the press after his death were his goal in the 1962 FA Cup semi-final replay against Burnley, despite his side eventually losing to the Clarets; and his selection for a London XI which lost to Barcelona in the Inter City Fairs Cup final in 1958. Perhaps the ultimate accolade however came from Sir Stanley Matthews when he selected Langley to be his opposite number in his final league match.

=== Queens Park Rangers ===
Langley left Fulham in 1965, moving to Queens Park Rangers in a £5,000 deal. Despite being in his mid thirties, he helped Rangers to a third-place finish in the Third Division in 1965–66 and the following season, he featured in the side which won the Third Division and won the 1966–67 League Cup, pulling off one of the greatest comebacks in football. They had had an outstanding run in earlier rounds, beating Colchester United 5–0 in the first round and Leicester City (4-2) Carlisle (2–1) and Birmingham City (7–2 on aggregate) in the semi-finals. In the final at Wembley Stadium, they met the holders, First Division side West Bromwich Albion and appeared to be heading for a comprehensive defeat after conceding two Clive Clark goals in the first half. Yet Rangers responded by scoring three goals in the last 17 minutes and winning 3–2, handing Langley the first, and only silverware of his career.

=== Return to non-league ===
After being released by QPR at the end of that season, Langley turned his attention to management, becoming player-manager of Hillingdon Borough of the Southern League on 26 September 1967. Yet again he tasted success, steering the club to finish Premier Division runners-up to Cambridge United in the 1968–69 season. In the following 1969–70 season they reached the third round proper of the FA Cup, beating Luton Town in the second round. He almost triumphed at Wembley once again in 1970–71 when Hillingdon featured in the FA Trophy final but his side lost 3–2 to Telford United.

== International career ==
Langley's career for his national team was short and sweet and he perhaps should have had more time to prove himself. Then manager Walter Winterbottom selected Langley for the home international against Scotland in April 1958 after his impressive first season with Fulham and he helped the side to a 4–0 victory and he played in the 2–1 victory over Portugal at Wembley, though he did miss a penalty in that game. However a 5–0 defeat by Yugoslavia in the next game meant that he was never called up again after an international career of barely three weeks.

== Post-playing career ==
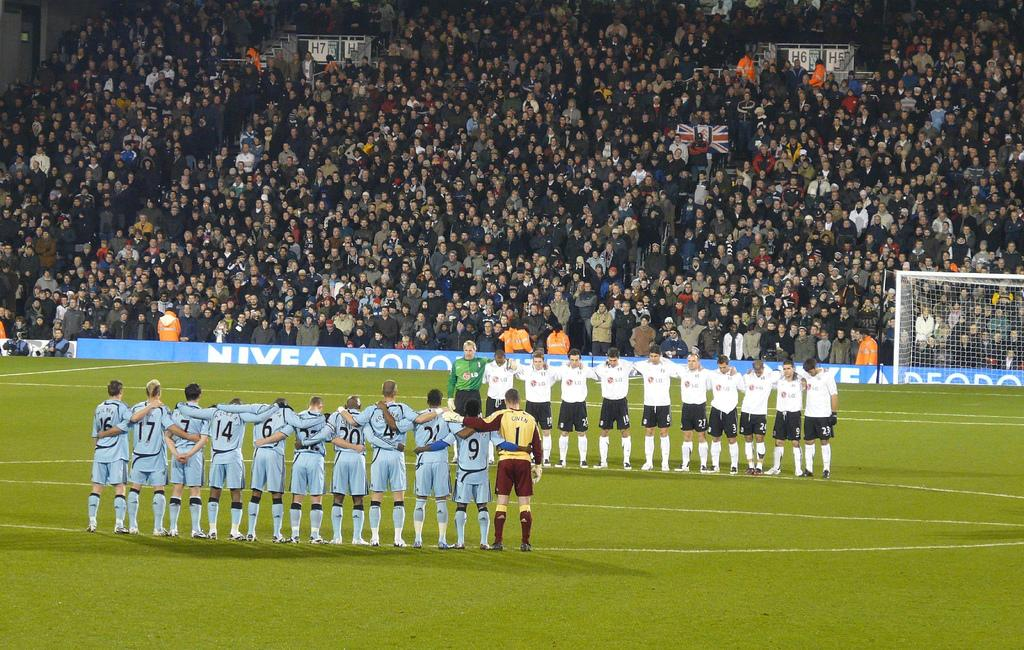
Langley minute silence before Fulham-Newcastle, 16 December 2007.

Langley left the role as Hillingdon Borough player-manager after the FA Trophy final in May 1971, becoming a trainer-coach at Crystal Palace on 23 August 1971. He returned to Hillingdon Borough as manager on 27 November 1973 serving until August 1975. He was unable to prevent the club's relegation in the 1973–74 season but oversaw their return to the Southern League Premier Division in the following season. In early March 1977 he became manager of Dulwich Hamlet where he strived, ultimately fruitlessly, to prevent their relegation into the Second Division of the Isthmian League. He returned to Hillingdon Borough as manager for the final time in the 1977–78 season before becoming general manager of the club in May 1978.

After leaving Hillingdon Borough Football Club, Langley worked in the hospitality sector as a managing steward at West Drayton Royal British Legion and later at Sipson Royal British Legion, where he was responsible for overseeing the operation of the clubs, including their bars and premises. He was known for his distinctive wide-legged gait, which has been attributed to years of playing football.

He became Club President of his Grandson Lee Langley's boyhood club; Staines Town. Lee attempted to follow in Jimmy's footsteps, trialling for Brentford, before becoming a trainee at QPR, interest in the young, but tough central midfielder also came from Chelsea; but within a month of this interest he tore a cruciate ligament and his time at the pro clubs came to an end. Lee is now a founder member and the Club President of Stoke & Torbay Police FC, whose annual charity matches are named 'The Gentleman Jim Cup' after Jimmy.

Langley died in London at the age of 78. Six days after his death his former club Fulham held a minute's silence before their home match with Newcastle United.

== Honours ==
Queens Park Rangers

- Football League Cup: 1966–67
