= Johnny Haynes =

English footballer

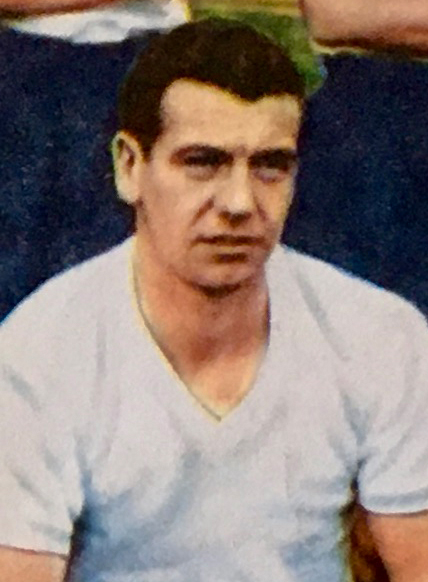
- Haynes with England in 1959

Personal information
- Full name: John Norman Haynes
- Date of birth: 17 October 1934
- Place of birth: Kentish Town, London, England
- Date of death: 18 October 2005 (aged 71)
- Place of death: Edinburgh, Scotland
- Height: 1.76 m (5 ft 9 in)
- Position: Inside forward

Senior career*
Years	Team	Apps	(Gls)
1952–1970	Fulham	594	(146)
1951	→ Wimbledon (loan)	6	(4)
1961	→ Toronto City (loan)	5	(1)
1970–1971	Durban City	24	(9)
1972–1973	Wealdstone	3	(0)
Total		632	(160)

International career
1955–1957	England U23	8	(8)
1954–1962	England	56	(18)

Managerial career
- 1968: Fulham (caretaker)
- * Club domestic league appearances and goals

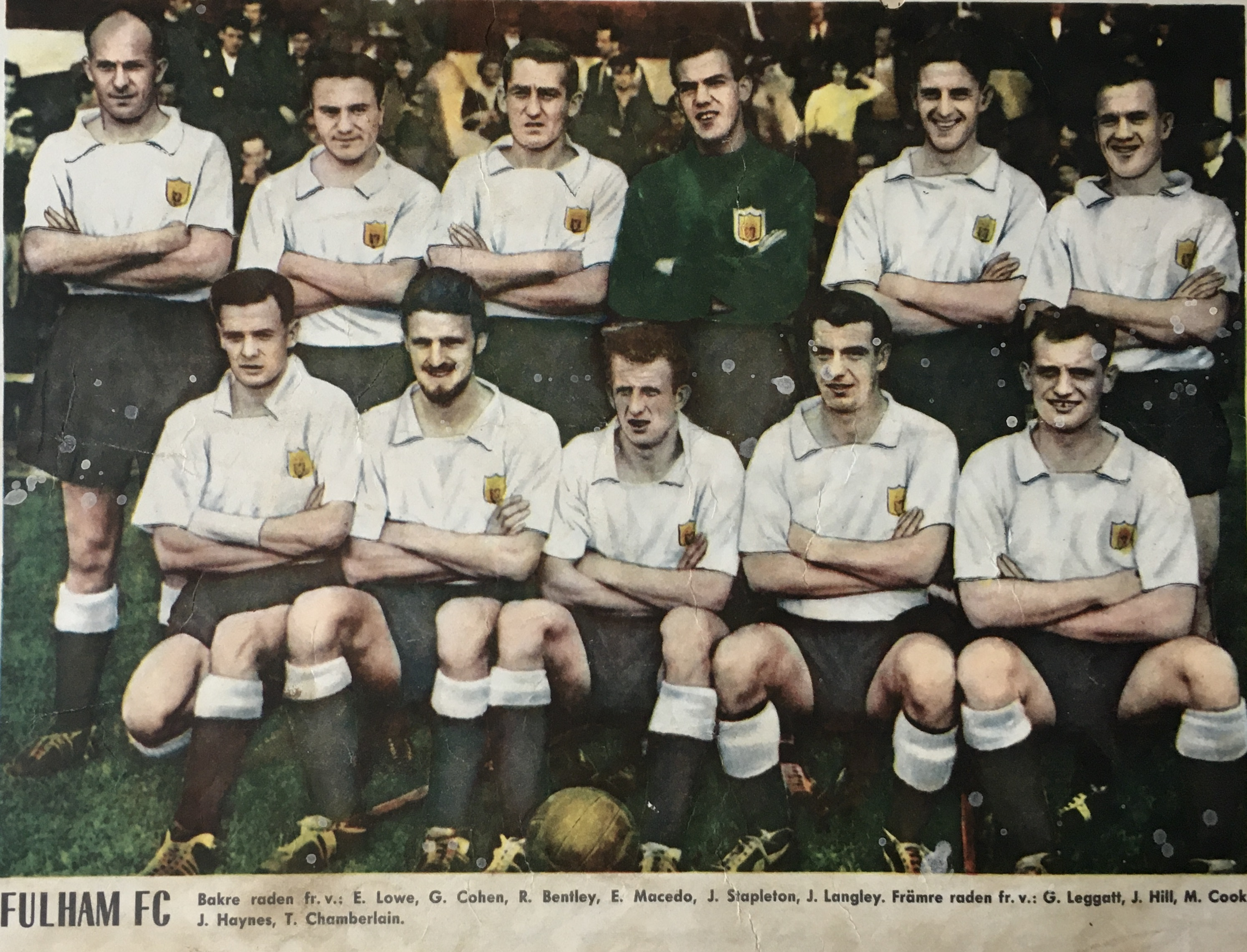
Fulham F.C. at 1958 with following players, from left standing: Eddie Lowe, George Cohen, Roy Bentley, Tony Macedo, Joe Stapleton, Jim Langley; front row: Graham Leggat, J. Hill, M. Cook, Johnny Haynes and Tosh Chamberlain.

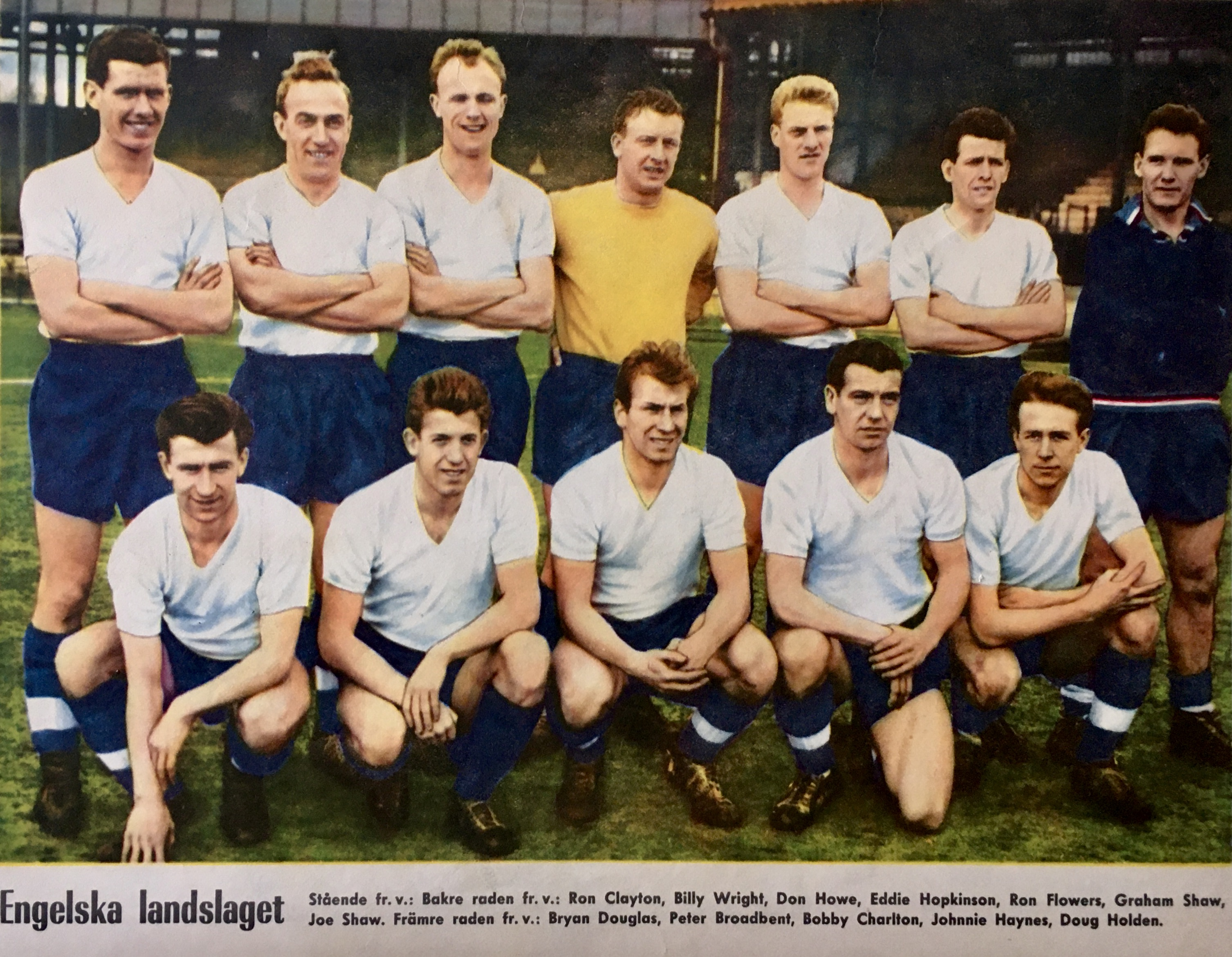
England national football team at Empire Stadium, London 11th April 1959. From left, standing: Ronnie Clayton, Billy Wright (captain), Don Howe, Eddie Hopkinson, Ron Flowers, Graham Swaw, Joe Shaw; front row: Bryan Douglas, Peter Broadbent, Bobby Charlton, Johnny Haynes and Doug Holden.

John Norman Haynes (17 October 1934 – 18 October 2005) was an English association footballer who played as an inside forward. He made 56 appearances for his country including 22 as captain. He was selected for three World Cup finals squads playing in the latter two of those. Nicknamed "the Maestro", his attacking play was noted for two-footed passing ability, vision and deftness of touch. Haynes is widely regarded as Fulham's greatest ever player, remaining loyal there for twenty years despite coming no nearer to a major trophy win than two FA Cup semi-final appearances. Immediately following the abolition of the £20 maximum wage in 1961, he became the first player to be paid £100 a week. He also had a spell on loan with Toronto City in 1961 and ended his playing days at Durban City, winning there the only trophy he won in his football career.

== Playing career ==
The son of a post office engineer, Haynes was born in Kentish Town and supported Arsenal as a boy. He signed for Fulham as a 15-year-old amateur in 1950 when Fulham were in a three-season spell in the First Division. He was loaned to then non-League Wimbledon. He made his senior debut aged 18 in the 1952 Boxing Day visit of Southampton to Fulham, then in their first season back in the Second Division.

Haynes made his debut for England in October 1954, scoring a goal in a 2–0 victory over Northern Ireland in Belfast. He first captained England in 1960 and played for them in two World Cups.

He was one of many signatories of a letter to The Times on 17 July 1958 opposing "the policy of apartheid" in international sport and defending "the principle of racial equality which is embodied in the Declaration of the Olympic Games".

Haynes played in his first of two FA Cup semi-finals in 1958. Fulham were eliminated in a replay by the remnants of Manchester United's Busby Babes team that had been devastated by the Munich air disaster the month before. United were the first top-division team Fulham played in that cup run. Fulham were promoted to the top division after finishing runners-up behind Sheffield Wednesday in 1959. In the 1959–60 season, Fulham finished 10th in the First Division, which was their highest league position until finishing 9th in the 2003–04 Premier League season. Following the abolition of the £20 maximum wage in 1961, he became Britain's first footballer to earn £100 per week. He played in a second FA Cup semi-final in 1962, losing in a replay to Burnley. In 1961, during the English off-season, he played abroad in the Eastern Canada Professional Soccer League with Toronto City.

In August 1962 on Blackpool promenade, the sports car in which he was returning late to his hotel was blown by a gust of wind into the path of another vehicle. Haynes suffered broken bones in both feet and a badly injured knee. He recounted that the police officer who attended the incident reassured him by saying "Don't worry son, you've only broken your legs". He missed almost the entire season and, when he returned to the Fulham side, was not quite the same player. Prior to the accident, he had captained England 22 times, and, being only 27, was expected to lead them in the 1966 FIFA World Cup, but he was never again selected for the national team.

Fulham were relegated in 1968. Haynes then had a single spell in football management, taking charge of Fulham for eighteen days in November that year after the dismissal of Bobby Robson as player-manager, but Haynes never had any ambition to go into coaching. That season, Fulham endured a second successive relegation. His last appearance for Fulham's first team was on 17 January 1970 in a Third Division home match against Stockport County. In total, he made 657 appearances for Fulham and scored 157 goals.

In 1970, Haynes announced his retirement, aged 35, and joined Durban City, playing one season and winning South Africa's 1970–71 National Football League. This was his only winner's medal in senior football. During the 1972–73 season, Haynes made three league appearances for non-League club Wealdstone.

== Post-playing career ==
On retiring from playing in 1970 he was already an active bookmaker. He sold his chain of bookmakers to The Tote in 1976. In 1985 he moved to Edinburgh, the city of his partner Avril. Haynes first met Avril in the 1960s when she travelled down to London to buy stock for boutiques she ran in Edinburgh. On moving to Edinburgh he ran a laundry business with Avril, played golf and watched local club, Heart of Midlothian. In 2004 he and Avril married in a private ceremony at Dalkeith registry office.

== Death ==
On 17 October 2005, his 71st birthday, Haynes was driving his car, with Avril as passenger, on Edinburgh's Dalry Road when he suffered a brain haemorrhage, instantaneously effectively rendering him brain-dead. The vehicle veered across the road and crashed into a van. After being kept on a ventilator for some 30 hours, the ventilator was turned off on the evening of 18 October 2005. The funeral at Mortonhall Crematorium was attended by ex-players Bobby Charlton, George Cohen, Sven-Göran Eriksson, Dave Mackay, Alan Mullery, Jimmy Murray and Bobby Robson, and also George Foulkes. Avril was unable to attend due to injuries from the car accident. Haynes was survived by Avril and his two stepchildren.

== Tributes ==
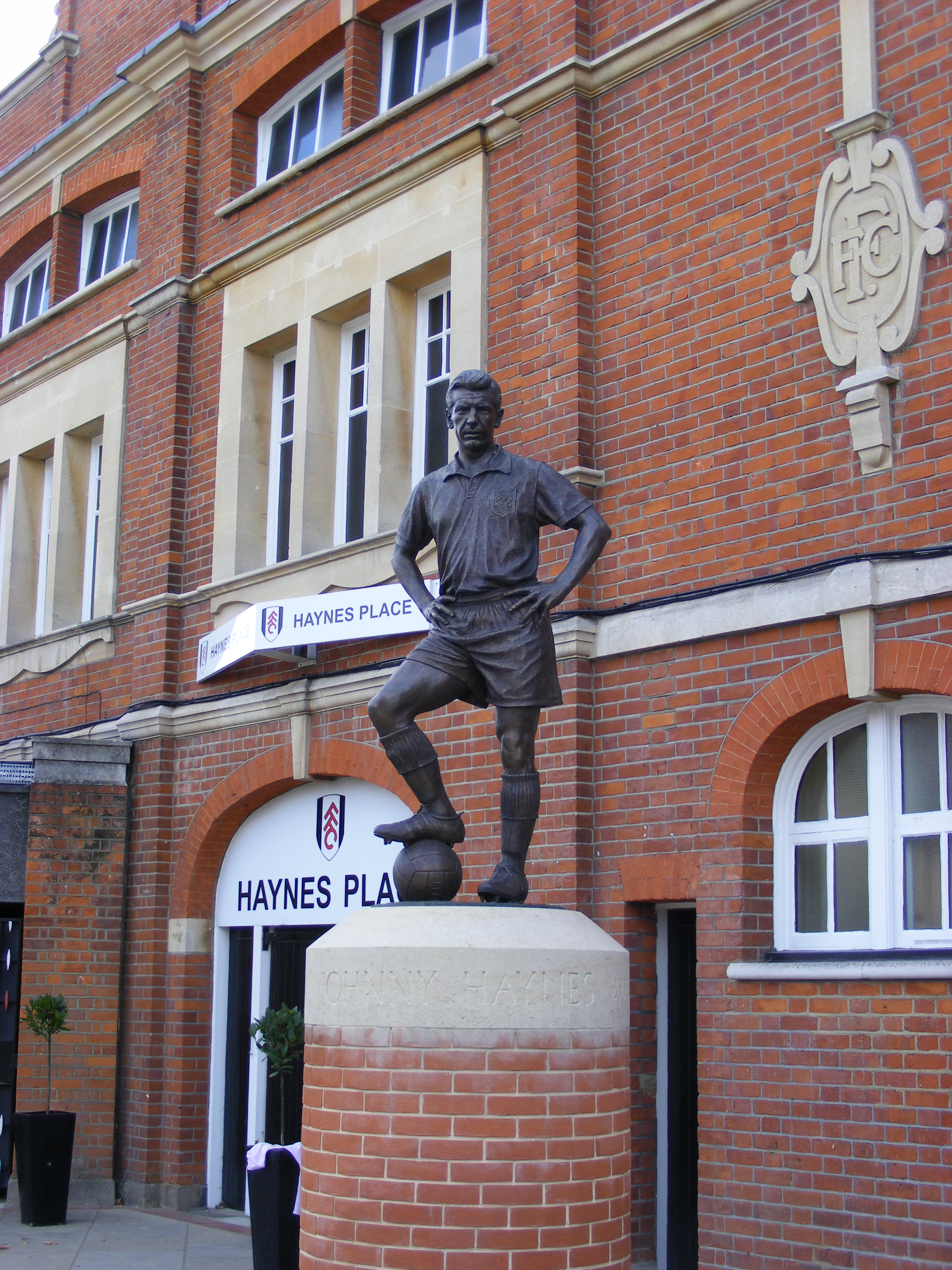
Statue of Haynes outside Craven Cottage

In 2002 Haynes became an inaugural inductee into the English Football Hall of Fame in recognition of his football talents and impact on the English game.

On the day of Haynes' death, Alan Mullery, another ex-Fulham and England player, made the following tribute: "He was the only reason I went to Fulham as a young boy of 15 leaving school. He was my hero, the captain of England and Fulham. The word great rolls off the tongue quite easily these days but he really was. He was the best passer of a ball I have ever seen—I don't know anyone who could pass a ball as accurately. Anyone who saw him will know what a great player he was."

Shortly after his death, the Stevenage Road Stand at Craven Cottage was renamed The Johnny Haynes Stand.

George Cohen, a World Cup winner for England in 1966 and a Fulham teammate of Johnny Haynes, stated: "I have a hundred individual memories of the beauty of John's play. One stands out for the sheer perfection of his skill. It was a charity match which, but for that one second, has faded completely from my memory. The ball came to him at speed on a wet, slippery surface but with the slightest of adjustments, one that was almost imperceptible, he played it inside a full-back and into the path of an on-running winger. I looked at our coach Dave Sexton on the bench and he caught my glance and shook his head as if to say 'fantastic'. Haynes could give you goose bumps on a wet night in a match that didn't matter."

Bobby Moore, England captain from 1964 to 1973, said of him: "Once you get used to watching that perfection you realised the rest of the secret. John was always available, always hungry for the ball, always wanting to play. I loved watching the player. Later I learnt to love the man." Pelé said he had "never seen a better passer of the ball" than Haynes.

The Fulham Supporters Trust stated: "His dedication, skill, professionalism, grace and charm—both in his playing days and in retirement—serve as a poignant reminder to many of today's footballers about what true greatness really means." On 28 July 2008, Fulham announced that fundraising had commenced, with the co-operation of a fan's group, to produce a lasting tribute to Haynes. The Johnny Haynes Statue was unveiled outside the stadium before the 0–0 draw v Sunderland on Saturday 18 October 2008.

== Career statistics ==
=== Club ===
Appearances and goals by club, season and competition
Club	Season	League			FA Cup		League Cup		Europe		Total	
Club	Season	Division	Apps	Goals	Apps	Goals	Apps	Goals	Apps	Goals	Apps	Goals
Fulham	1952–53	Second Division	18	1								
Fulham	1953–54	Second Division	41	16								
Fulham	1954–55	Second Division	37	8								
Fulham	1955–56	Second Division	40	18								
Fulham	1956–57	Second Division	33	5								
Fulham	1957–58	Second Division	38	15								
Fulham	1958–59	Second Division	34	26								
Fulham	1959–60	First Division	31	10								
Fulham	1960–61	First Division	39	9								
Fulham	1961–62	First Division	38	5								
Fulham	1962–63	First Division	8	0								
Fulham	1963–64	First Division	40	8								
Fulham	1964–65	First Division	39	5								
Fulham	1965–66	First Division	33	6								
Fulham	1966–67	First Division	36	6								
Fulham	1967–68	First Division	34	5								
Fulham	1968–69	Second Division	28	1								
Fulham	1969–70	Third Division	27	3								
Career total			594	147								

=== International ===
Appearances and goals by national team and year
National team	Year	Apps	Goals
England	1954	1	1
England	1955	2	0
England	1956	7	4
England	1957	6	3
England	1958	10	4
England	1959	7	1
England	1960	7	3
England	1961	8	2
England	1962	8	0
Total		56	18

Scores and results list England's goal tally first, score column indicates score after each Haynes goal.

List of international goals scored by Johnny Haynes
No.	Date	Venue	Opponent	Score	Result	Competition	Ref.
1	2 October 1954	Windsor Park, Belfast, Northern Ireland	Northern Ireland	1–0	2–0	1954–55 British Home Championship	
2	14 April 1956	Hampden Park, Glasgow, Scotland	Scotland	1–1	1–1	1955–56 British Home Championship	
3	20 May 1956	Helsinki Olympic Stadium, Helsinki, Finland	Finland	–	5–1	Friendly	
4	26 May 1956	Olympiastadion, Berlin, Germany	West Germany	3–0	3–1	Friendly	
5	14 November 1956	Wembley Stadium, London, England	Wales	3–1	3–1	1956–57 British Home Championship	
6	15 May 1957	Idrætsparken, Copenhagen, Denmark	Denmark	1–1	4–1	1958 FIFA World Cup qualification	
7	19 October 1957	Ninian Park, Cardiff, Wales	Wales	2–0	4–0	1957–58 British Home Championship	
8	19 October 1957	Ninian Park, Cardiff, Wales	Wales	4–0	4–0	1957–58 British Home Championship	
9	15 June 1958	Ryavallen, Borås, Sweden	Austria	2–2	2–2	1958 FIFA World Cup	
10	22 October 1958	Wembley Stadium, London, England	Soviet Union	1–0	5–0	Friendly	
11	22 October 1958	Wembley Stadium, London, England	Soviet Union	2–0	5–0	Friendly	
12	22 October 1958	Wembley Stadium, London, England	Soviet Union	3–0	5–0	Friendly	
13	28 May 1959	Wrigley Field, Los Angeles, United States	United States	8–1	8–1	Friendly	
14	11 May 1960	Wembley Stadium, London, England	Yugoslavia	3–3	3–3	Friendly	
15	19 October 1960	Stade Municipal, Luxembourg City, Luxembourg	Luxembourg	6–0	9–0	1962 FIFA World Cup qualification	
16	23 November 1960	Wembley Stadium, London, England	Wales	3–0	5–1	1960–61 British Home Championship	
17	15 April 1961	Wembley Stadium, London, England	Scotland	6–3	9–3	1960–61 British Home Championship	
18	15 April 1961	Wembley Stadium, London, England	Scotland	7–3	9–3	1960–61 British Home Championship	

== Honours ==
Durban City

- National Football League: 1970–71

Individual

- Ballon d'Or Bronze Award: 1961
- Football League 100 Legends: 1998
- Member of English Football Hall of Fame: 2002

== Bibliography ==
- Brown, Geoff and Hogsbjerg, Christian. Apartheid is not a Game: Remembering the Stop the Seventy Tour campaign. London: Redwords, 2020. ISBN 9781912926589.

Sporting positions
Preceded by Billy Wright	England captain 1960–1963	Succeeded by Bobby Moore
