= Graham Leggat =

Scottish footballer and manager (1934–2015)

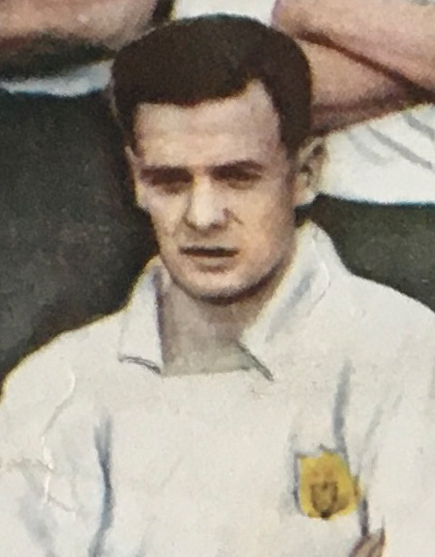
- Leggat with Fulham in 1958

Personal information
- Full name: Graham Leggat
- Date of birth: 20 June 1934
- Place of birth: Aberdeen, Scotland
- Date of death: 29 August 2015 (aged 81)
- Place of death: Toronto, Ontario, Canada
- Position: Right winger

Youth career
- Banks O'Dee

Senior career*
Years	Team	Apps	(Gls)
1953–1958	Aberdeen	109	(64)
1958–1966	Fulham	254	(127)
1966–1967	Birmingham City	15	(3)
1968	Rotherham United	16	(7)
1970	Bromsgrove Rovers		
1971	Toronto Metros	11	(2)
Total		405	(203)

International career
1954–1957	Scottish Football League XI	5	(6)
1956–1960	Scotland	18	(8)
1959	SFA trial v SFL	1	(0)

Managerial career
- 1971–1972: Toronto Metros
- * Club domestic league appearances and goals

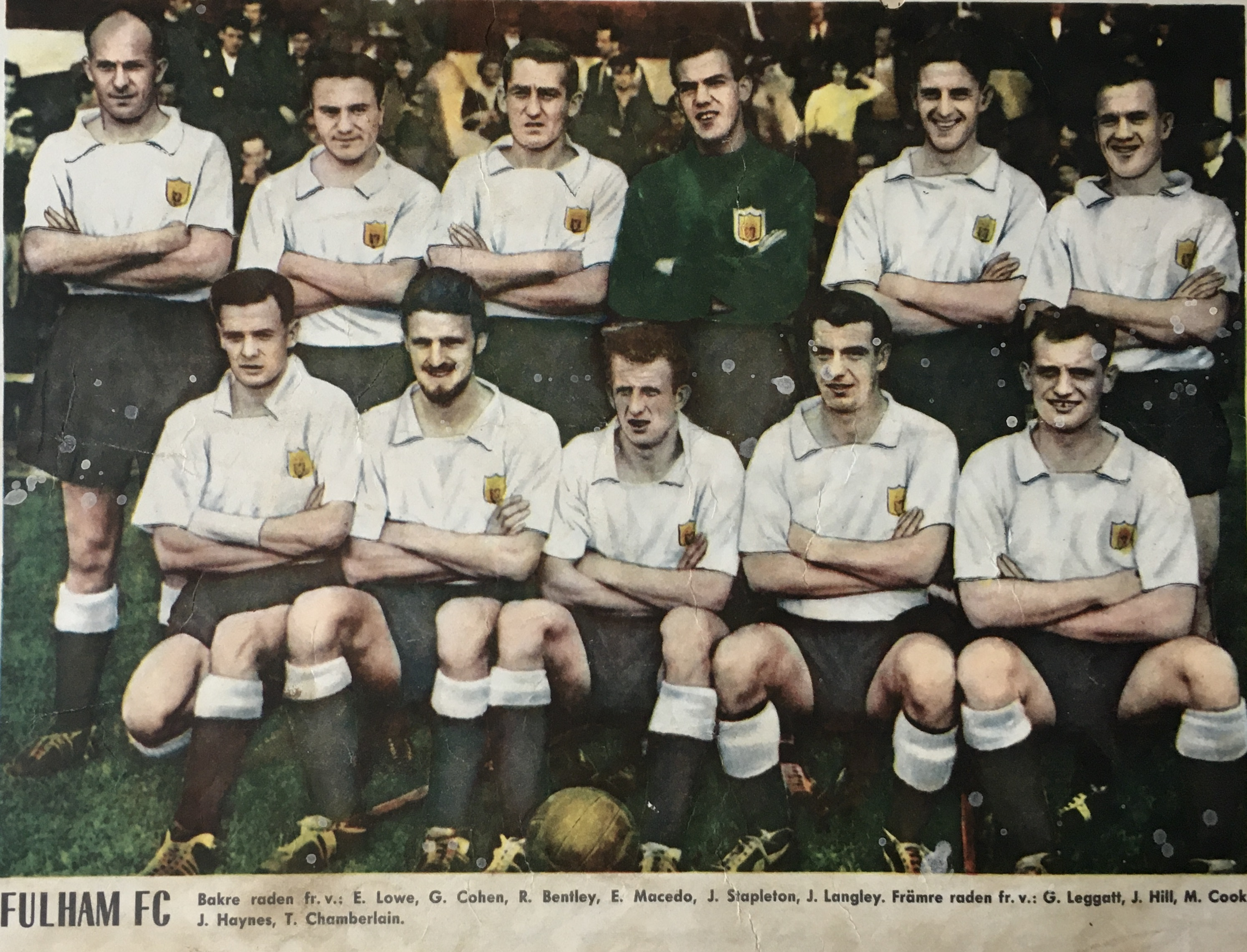
Fulham F.C. at 1958 with following players, from left standing: Eddie Lowe, George Cohen, Roy Bentley, Tony Macedo, Joe Stapleton, Jim Langley; front row: Graham Leggat, J. Hill, M. Cook, Johnny Haynes and Tosh Chamberlain.

Graham Leggat (20 June 1934 – 29 August 2015) was a Scottish international footballer.

== Playing career ==
Born in Aberdeen, Leggat started his career at his home town club as a right winger. He was part of the Aberdeen team that won the Scottish league title in 1954–55 and the 1955–56 Scottish League Cup. In November 2017, he was one of four inductees into the Aberdeen Hall of Fame.

He was transferred to Fulham in 1958 for £16,000 (£326,000 today), where he formed a right flank partnership with England captain Johnny Haynes. Leggat held the record for the fastest hat-trick in the English league, having scored three goals in three minutes in a 10–1 win for Fulham against Ipswich Town on 26 December 1963. This record was broken in May 2015 by Sadio Mané of Southampton.

He wound down his career with short spells at Birmingham City, Rotherham United and Bromsgrove Rovers.

=== International ===
Leggat was selected in the Scotland squad for the 1958 FIFA World Cup in Sweden, playing in the Scots' matches against Yugoslavia and Paraguay. In total he earned 18 full caps between 1956 and 1960. He also scored six goals for the Scottish Football League XI in five appearances.

== Coaching and media career ==
After a brief period working as a coach at Aston Villa, in 1971 Leggat emigrated to Canada and served as the first head coach of the Toronto Metros. Several years later he would become vice-president and managing director for the Edmonton Drillers from 1979 to 1980.

He began a second career as an analyst on soccer telecasts for the CBC at the 1976 Summer Olympics and at the World Cup. He later became host of TSN's popular Soccer Saturday program as well as an on-air analyst on its soccer telecasts. He was inducted into the Canadian Soccer Hall of Fame in 2001 as a 'builder'. Leggat died in August 2015, aged 81.

== Personal life ==
His son, also named Graham Leggat, was executive director of the San Francisco Film Society from October 2005 until his death in August 2011.

== Career statistics ==
=== Club ===
Appearances and goals by club, season and competition
Club	Season	League			National cup (Note: Includes Scottish Cup, FA Cup)		League cup (Note: Includes Scottish League Cup, Football League Cup)		Other		Total	
Club	Season	Division	Apps	Goals	Apps	Goals	Apps	Goals	Apps	Goals	Apps	Goals
Aberdeen	1953–54	Scottish Division One	26	15	5	4	0	0	—		31	19
Aberdeen	1954–55	Scottish Division One	26	11	5	0	5	2	—		36	13
Aberdeen	1955–56	Scottish Division One	18	19	1	1	10	9	—		29	29
Aberdeen	1956–57	Scottish Division One	24	12	2	1	5	3	—		31	16
Aberdeen	1957–58	Scottish Division One	15	7	3	1	6	7	—		24	15
Aberdeen	Total		109	64	16	7	26	21	—		151	92
Fulham	1958–59	Second Division	36	21	4	1	—		—		40	22
Fulham	1959–60	First Division	28	18	2	2	—		—		30	20
Fulham	1960–61	First Division	36	23	0	0	0	0	—		36	23
Fulham	1961–62	First Division	31	14	8	1	0	0	—		39	15
Fulham	1962–63	First Division	33	10	1	0	1	0	—		35	10
Fulham	1963–64	First Division	25	15	2	1	1	0	—		28	16
Fulham	1964–65	First Division	17	4	0	0	2	0	—		19	4
Fulham	1965–66	First Division	33	16	1	0	3	0	—		37	16
Fulham	1966–67	First Division	15	8	0	0	1	2	—		16	10
Fulham	Total		254	129	18	5	8	2	—		280	136
Birmingham City	1966–67	Second Division	9	1	3	0	0	0	—		12	1
Birmingham City	1967–68	Second Division	7	2	0	0	0	0	—		7	2
Birmingham City	Total		16	3	3	0	0	0	—		19	3
Rotherham United	1968–69	Third Division	16	7	2	0	1	0	—		19	7
Bromsgrove Rovers	1969–70	West Midlands (Regional) League	8	6	0	0	—		1 (Note: Appearance in Midland Floodlit League)	0	9	6
Toronto Metros	1971	North American Soccer League	11	2	—		—				11	2
Career total			414	211	39	12	35	23	1	0	489	246

=== International ===
Appearances and goals by national team and year
National team	Year	Apps	Goals
Scotland	1956	2	1
Scotland	1957	1	1
Scotland	1958	6	1
Scotland	1959	5	4
Scotland	1960	4	1
Total		18	8

=== International goals ===
Scores and results list Scotland's goal tally first, score column indicates score after each Leggat goal.

List of international goals scored by Graham Leggat
No.	Date	Venue	Opponent	Score	Result	Competition
1	14 April 1956	Hampden Park, Glasgow, Scotland	England	1–0	1–1	1956 British Home Championship
2	5 October 1957	Windsor Park, Belfast, Northern Ireland	Northern Ireland	1–1	1–1	1958 British Home Championship
3	18 October 1958	Ninian Park, Cardiff, Wales	Wales	1–0	3–0	1959 British Home Championship
4	6 May 1959	Hampden Park, Glasgow, Scotland	West Germany	3–1	3–2	Friendly
5	27 May 1959	Olympisch Stadion, Netherlands	Netherlands	2–1	2–1	Friendly
6	3 October 1959	Windsor Park, Belfast, Northern Ireland	Northern Ireland	1–0	4–0	1960 British Home Championship
7	4 November 1959	Hampden Park, Glasgow, Scotland	Wales	1–1	1–1	1960 British Home Championship
8	19 April 1960	Hampden Park, Glasgow, Scotland	England	1–0	1–1	1960 British Home Championship
