= List of Australian rules football clubs in New South Wales =

This is a list of clubs that play Australian rules football in New South Wales at the senior level. Guide to abbreviations:

- FC = Football Club
- AFC = Australian Football Club (mainly used if in Queensland or NSW or outside Australia) / Amateur Football Club (mainly used in the other Australian States)
- ARFC = Australian Rules Football Club

== National Level ==
=== Australian Football League ===
Club	Colours	Nickname	Home venue	Former league	Est.	Years in VFA/VFL	Premierships	
Club	Colours	Nickname	Home venue	Former league	Est.	Years in VFA/VFL	Total	Recent
Greater Western Sydney		Giants	ENGIE Stadium, Sydney Olympic Park	NEAFL	2009	2012–	0	–
Sydney (South Melbourne 1896–1981)		Swans	Sydney Cricket Ground, Moore Park	VFA	1874	1896–	5	2012

== State Level ==
=== AFL Canberra – First Grade ===
Club	Colours	Nickname	Home Ground	Former League	Est.	Years in AFLC	AFLC Senior Premierships	
Club	Colours	Nickname	Home Ground	Former League	Est.	Years in AFLC	Total	Most recent
Batemans Bay		Seahawks	Hanging Rock Oval, Batemans Bay, NSW	SCAFL	1984	1990–1998, 2011–	2	2023*
Queanbeyan		Tigers	Margaret Donoghoe Sports Complex, Karabar, NSW	–	1925	1925–1943, 1946–1951, 1958–1965, 1970–	15	2024

=== AFL Sydney – Premier Division ===
Club	Colours	Nickname	Home Ground	Former League	Est.	Years in NSWAFL	Known NSWAFL Senior Premierships	
Club	Colours	Nickname	Home Ground	Former League	Est.	Years in NSWAFL	Total	Most recent
East Coast (Baulkham Hills 1976–99, Sydney Hills 2012–14)		Eagles	Kanebridge Oval, Rouse Hill	NEAFL	1976	1988–	4	2016
Inner West (Western Suburbs 1926–2016)		Magpies	Picken Oval, Croydon Park	–	1926	1926–1930, 1948–	11	2017
Manly-Warringah		Wolves	Weldon Oval, Curl Curl	–	1969	1971–1979, 2004–	9	2025
North Shore		Bombers	Gore Hill Oval, St Leonards	–	1903	1903–1914, 1921–1941, 1946–2025	20	2024
Pennant Hills		Demons	Mike Kenny Oval, Cherrybrook	–	1971	1971–	13	2018
South West Sydney		Blues	Bob Prenter Oval, Macquarie Fields and Rosedale Oval, Warwick Farm	–	2022	2022–	2	2023
St George		Dragons	Olds Park, Penshurst	–	1929	1929–	9	2024
Sydney University		Students	University Oval, Camperdown	NSWFA	1887	1948–1957, 1962–1968, 1971–1979, 1988–1994, 2004–	13	2020
UNSW-Eastern Suburbs		Bulldogs	Henson Park, Marrickville	–	1999	2000–	13	2024
UTS		Bats	Waverley Oval, Bondi Junction	–	2000	2000–	11	2023

=== Victorian Football League ===
Club	Colours	Moniker	Home venue	Former league	Est.	Years in VFA/VFL	Premierships	
Club	Colours	Moniker	Home venue	Former league	Est.	Years in VFA/VFL	Total	Recent
Greater Western Sydney (R)		Giants	Tom Wills Oval, Sydney Olympic Park	NEAFL	2012	2021–	0	–
Sydney (R)		Swans	Tramway Oval, Moore Park	NEAFL	1919	2021–	0	–

== Metropolitan ==
=== Sydney AFL – Divisions 1–6 ===
Club	Colours	Nickname	Home Ground	Former League	Est.	Years in NSWAFL	Known NSWAFL Senior Premierships	
Club	Colours	Nickname	Home Ground	Former League	Est.	Years in NSWAFL	Total	Most recent
Balmain		Tigers	Rozelle Parklands, Rozelle	–	1903	1903–1909, 1913, 1919–1925, 1948–1987, 1994–	3	2014
Camden		Cats	Fairfax Reserve, Harrington Park	SCAFL	1982	2008–	2	2018
Hawkesbury Jets (Norwest Jets 2001–21)		Jets	Bensons Lane, Richmond Lowlands	–	2001	2001–	2	2006
Macquarie University		Warriors	Macquarie University Oval, Macquarie Park	–	1969	1971, 1973–1979, 2004–	3	2025
Newtown		Breakaways	HJ Mahoney Park, Marrickville	–	2002	2002–	1	2020
Parramatta (Holroyd-Parramatta 1983–2019)		Goannas	Gipps Road Oval, Smithfield	–	1979	1979–	1	2001
Penrith		Rams	Greygums Oval, Cranebrook	–	1981	1981–	4	2020
Randwick City (Saints AFC 2010–11)		Saints	Pioneers Park, Malabar	–	2010	2010–	4	2024
South West Sydney		Blues	Bob Prenter Oval, Macquarie Fields and Rosedale Oval, Warwick Farm	–	2022	2022–	2	2023
Southern Power (Sutherland 1972–93, Cronulla-Sutherland 1994–99, Southern Sharks 2000–08)		Power	Lincoln Oval (Waratah Park No 4), Sutherland	–	1972	1974–1979, 2004–	5	2024
Western Magic (Blacktown 2012–15)		Magic	Blacktown International Sportspark, Rooty Hill	–	2012	2012–	3	2015
Wollondilly		Knights	Hannaford Oval, Wilton	SCAFL	1989	1989–2007, 2014–	1	2016

=== Queensland Football Association ===
Club	Colours	Nickname	Home Ground	Former League	Est.	Years in AFLC	QFA Senior Premierships	
Club	Colours	Nickname	Home Ground	Former League	Est.	Years in AFLC	Total	Most recent
Tweed Coast		Tigers	Barry Sheppard Oval, Bogangar, New South Wales	SAFL	2009	2012–	3	2015

== Country ==
=== AFL Broken Hill ===
Club	Colours	Nickname	Home Ground	Est.	Years in BHFL	BHFL Senior Premierships	
Club	Colours	Nickname	Home Ground	Est.	Years in BHFL	Total	Years
Central Broken Hill		Magpies	Memorial Oval, Broken Hill	1900	1900–	24	1910, 1912, 1913, 1915, 1935, 1937, 1938, 1940, 1941, 1943, 1971, 1972, 1973, 1979, 1981, 1982, 1983, 1984, 1985, 1993, 1995, 2001, 2006, 2010
North Broken Hill		Bulldogs	Jubilee Oval, Broken Hill	1899	1899–	39	1902, 1904, 1905, 1907, 1908, 1909, 1911, 1914, 1920, 1924, 1934, 1936, 1945, 1946, 1947, 1948, 1950, 1951, 1957, 1959, 1960, 1965, 1975, 1976, 1977, 1986, 1988, 1992, 1994, 1998, 2000, 2004, 2007, 2008, 2011, 2012, 2013, 2016, 2024
South Broken Hill		Roos	Alma Oval, Broken Hill	1891	1891–1897, 1900–	37	1906, 1919, 1923, 1926, 1928, 1931, 1942, 1944, 1952, 1953, 1956, 1958, 1961, 1967, 1968, 1969, 1970, 1974, 1987, 1989, 1991, 1996, 1997, 1999, 2002, 2003, 2005, 2009, 2014, 2015, 2017, 2018, 2019, 2022, 2023, 2025
West Broken Hill		Robins	Jubilee Oval, Broken Hill	1900	1900–	24	1900, 1901, 1903, 1916, 1917, 1918, 1921, 1922, 1927, 1929, 1930, 1932, 1933, 1939, 1949, 1954, 1955, 1962, 1963, 1964, 1966, 1978, 1980, 1990

=== AFL Canberra – Community Divisions ===
Club	Colours	Nickname	Home Ground	Former League	Est.	Years in AFLC	AFLC Senior Premierships	
Club	Colours	Nickname	Home Ground	Former League	Est.	Years in AFLC	Total	Most recent
Cootamundra		Blues	Clarke Oval, Cootamundra	FFL	1960	2004–	3	2017
Googong (Harman 1976–2015)		Hogs	Rockley Oval, Googong, NSW	MAFL	1976	1995–	2	2015
Goulburn		Swans	Goodhew Park, Goulburn, NSW	–	2004	2004–	2	2009
Murrumbateman		Eagles	Murrumbateman Recreational Oval, Murrumbateman, NSW	–	2019	2020–	2	2023
Southern Cats (Cooma 1976–2015)		Cats	Snowy Oval, Cooma, NSW	MAFL	1976	1996–	1	2018
Yass		Roos	Joe O'Connor Park, Yass, NSW	–	2002	2002–	1	2008

=== AFL Central West ===
Club	Colours	Nickname	Home ground	Former league	Est.	Years in CWAFL	CWAFL Senior Premierships	
Club	Colours	Nickname	Home ground	Former league	Est.	Years in CWAFL	Total	Years
Bathurst		Bushrangers	George Park, Bathurst	–	2004	2004–	10	2004, 2005, 2009, 2012, 2017, 2019, 2020, 2022, 2024, 2025
Bathurst		Giants	George Park 2, Bathurst	–	2014	2014–	1	2023
Cowra		Blues	Mulyan Oval, Cowra	–	1982	1982–	7	1986, 1987, 2006, 2008, 2010, 2011, 2016
Dubbo		Demons	South Dubbo Oval, Dubbo	–	1981	1982–	4	1985, 2000, 2003, 2007
Orange		Tigers	Bloomfield Oval, Orange	–	1982	1982–	10	1983, 1991, 1992, 1998, 1999, 2002, 2013, 2014, 2015, 2018
Parkes		Panthers	North Parkes Oval, Parkes	NRFNL	1980	1982–1990, 1997–	4	1988, 1989, 1990, 2001

=== AFL Hunter Central Coast ===
Club	Colours	Nickname	Home Ground	Former League	Est.	Years in HCCAFL	HCCAFL Senior Premierships	
Club	Colours	Nickname	Home Ground	Former League	Est.	Years in HCCAFL	Total	Years
Cardiff		Hawks	Pasterfield Sports Complex, Cameron Park	NAFL	1967	2000–	4	2002, 2004, 2005, 2006
Killarney Vale		Bombers	Adelaide Street Oval, Killarney Vale	CCAFL	1978	2000–	2	2007, 2022
Lake Macquarie		Dockers	Tulkaba Park, Teralba	–	1997	2003–	0	–
Maitland		Saints	Max McMahon Oval, Rutherford	–	2007	2012–	1	2017
Muswellbrook		Cats	Weeraman Fields, Muswellbrook	NWAFL	1988	2014–2023, 2025–	0	–
Nelson Bay		Marlins	Dick Burwell Oval, Nelson Bay	NAFL	1980	2000–	2	2013, 2022
Newcastle City		Blues	Newcastle No. 1 Sportsground, Newcastle West	NAFL	1883	2000–	10	2003, 2008, 2009, 2010, 2011, 2013, 2016, 2018, 2023, 2024
Port Stephens		Power	Ferodale Park, Medowie	–	1999	2017–	0	–
Singleton		Roosters	Rose Point Park, Singleton	NAFL	1982	2006–	3	2010, 2012, 2016
Terrigal-Avoca		Panthers	Hylton Moore Oval, East Gosford	CCAFL	1976	2000–	8	2000, 2012, 2014, 2015, 2017, 2019, 2020, 2025
The Entrance Bateau Bay		Blues	Bateau Bay Sports Facility, Bateau Bay	CCAFL	1983	2014–	1	2016
University of Newcastle		Seahorses	Connolly Park, Carrington	–	2026	2026–	0	–
Warners Bay		Bulldogs	Feighan Oval, Warners Bay	NAFL	1974	2000–	0	–
Wyong Lakes		Magpies	Don Small Oval, Tacoma	CCAFL	1975	2000–	1	2014

=== AFL North Coast ===
Club	Colours	Nickname	Home ground	Former League	Est.	Years in NCAFL	NCAFL Senior Premierships	
Club	Colours	Nickname	Home ground	Former League	Est.	Years in NCAFL	Total	Years
Coffs Harbour		Breakers	Fitzroy Oval, Coffs Harbour	–	2014	2015–	3	2017, 2019, 2025
Grafton		Tigers	Ellem Oval, Grafton	SAFL	1982	1982–1995, 2002–	3	2011, 2012, 2020
Northern Beaches (Woolgoolga 1982–2005)		Blues	Wiigulga Sports Complex,Woolgoolga	–	1982	1982–2005, 2019–	9	1982, 1983, 1985, 1987, 1988, 1992, 1993, 1996, 1998
Port Macquarie		Magpies	Wayne Richards Park, Port Macquarie	NEAFL, MNAFL	1981	1982–1984, 1993–	5	2000, 2007, 2013, 2022, 2024
Sawtell–Toormina		Saints	Richardson Park, Sawtell	–	1987	1987, 1991–2001, 2003–	10	1997, 2005, 2006, 2008, 2009, 2010, 2014, 2015, 2016, 2018

=== AFL North East Border Female Football ===
Club	Colors	Nickname	Home Ground	Former League	Est.	NEBFFL Seasons	NEBFFL Senior Premierships	
Club	Colors	Nickname	Home Ground	Former League	Est.	NEBFFL Seasons	Total	Seasons
Lavington		Panthers	Lavington Sports Ground, Hamilton Valley	–	1880s	2015–	4	2022, 2023, 2024, 2025
Corowa-Rutherglen		Kangaroos	John Foord Oval, Corowa	–	1979	2025–	0	–
Thurgoona		Bulldogs	Thurgoona Oval, Thurgoona	–	1988	2017–2020, 2022–	2	2018, 2019

=== AFL North West NSW ===
Club	Colours	Nickname	Home Ground	Est	Years in NWAFL	Senior Premierships			
Club	Colours	Nickname	Home Ground	Est	Years in NWAFL	Men		Women	
Club	Colours	Nickname	Home Ground	Est	Years in NWAFL	Total	Years	Total	Years
Gunnedah & District		Bulldogs, Poochettes	Wolseley Park, Gunnedah	1977	2002–	3	2017, 2019, 2020	2	2020, 2023
Inverell		Saints	Varley Oval, Inverell	2004	2005–	5	2007, 2010, 2018, 2023, 2024	4	2019, 2022, 2024, 2025
New England		Nomads	Bellevue Oval, Armidale	1999	1999–2023, 2025–	9	2000, 2001, 2004, 2012, 2013, 2014, 2015, 2016, 2023	0	–
Tamworth (Note: Known as Nuttsy's Bulldogs 1997–1998; Cargill Kangaroos 1999–2001; Tamworth Kangaroos 2002–present)		Kangaroos	Bicentennial Park, Tamworth	1997	1997–	4	2002, 2003, 2008, 2011	0	–
Tamworth (Note: Known as David Mitchell Swans 1997–2001)		Swans	Bicentennial Park, Tamworth	1997	2002–	5	1997, 1999 2006, 2009, 2025	0	–

=== AFL Sapphire Coast ===
Club	Colours	Nickname	Home Ground	Est.	Years in SCAFL	SCAFL Senior Premierships	
Club	Colours	Nickname	Home Ground	Est.	Years in SCAFL	Total	Years
Bega-Tathra		Kangaroos	Lawrence Park Oval, Tathra and Roy Howard Oval, Bega	2025	2025–	0	–
Bermagui		Breakers	Dickinson Oval, Bermagui	1990	1990–1994, 2009–	0	–
Eden		Whalers	Barclay Street Oval, Eden	1983	1984–	0	–
Merimbula Diggers (Note: Known as Merimbula RSL Diggers until the end of the 1989 season)		Diggers	Berrambool Sporting Complex, Merimbula	1983	1984–	8	1995, 1997, 1998, 2009, 2019, 2020, 2024, 2025
Narooma		Lions	Bill Smyth Memorial Oval, Narooma	1983	1984–	5	1985, 1986, 2018, 2022, 2023
Pambula		Panthers	Pambula Sporting Complex, Pambula	1983	1984–	5	1984, 2006, 2014, 2015, 2017

=== AFL South Coast ===
Club	Colours	Nickname	Home Ground	Former League	Est.	Years in SCAFL	SCAFL Senior Premierships	
Club	Colours	Nickname	Home Ground	Former League	Est.	Years in SCAFL	Total	Years
Bay & Basin		Bombers	Bay & Basin Leisure Centre, Vincentia	–	1999	2019, 2023–	1	2025
Bomaderry		Tigers	Royal Artie Smith Oval, Bomaderry	–	1969	1970–	8	1989, 1994, 2000, 2004, 2006, 2007, 2008, 2010
Figtree		Kangaroos	Figtree Oval, Figtree	–	1999	2010–	4	2020, 2022, 2023, 2025
Kiama		Power	Bonaira Playing Field, Kiama	–	1999	2002–	3	2009, 2011, 2018
Northern Districts (Bulli-Woonona 1988–?)		Tigers	Hollymount Park, Woonona	IAFL	1971	1988–	0	–
Port Kembla		Blacks	Kully Bay Oval, Warrawong	IAFL	1966	1989–	2	1993, 1999
Shellharbour City		Suns	Myimbarr Community Park, Shellharbour	–	2011	2011–	0	-
Wollongong		Bulldogs	Keira Oval, Mount Keira	–	2008	2008–	5	2012, 2013, 2014, 2015, 2024
Wollongong		Lions	North Dalton Park, Fairy Meadows	SAFL	1966	1971–1974, 2015–	5	1969, 1970, 2015, 2016, 2019

=== Central Murray Football Netball League ===
Club	Colours	Moniker	Home venue	Former league	Est.	Years in CMFNL	CMFNL premierships	
Club	Colours	Moniker	Home venue	Former league	Est.	Years in CMFNL	Total	Most recent
Balranald		Roos	Greenham Park, Balranald	NWMFL	1887	1955–	5	2009
Hay		Lions	Hay Recreation Reserve, Hay	B&DFL, GRFL	1937	1975–1980, 2026–	0	–
Koondrook Barham		River Raiders	Barham Recreation Reserve, Barham	NEFL	1996	1997–	0	–
Moulamein		Swans	Moulamein Recreation Reserve, Moulamein	GRFL	1946	2026–	0	–
Tooleybuc Manangatang		Saints	Tooleybuc Recreation Reserve, Tooleybuc, New South Wales and Manangatang Recreation Reserve, Manangatang, Victoria	–	2004	2004–	1	2007

=== Farrer Football Netball League ===
Club	Colours	Nickname	Home Ground	Former league	Est.	Years in FFL	FFL Senior Premierships	
Club	Colours	Nickname	Home Ground	Former league	Est.	Years in FFL	Total	Years
Barellan United		Two Blues	Barellan Sportsground, Barellan	CRFL, NRFNL	1970	1982–1992, 2015–	1	1987
Charles Sturt University (Rivcoll 1982-2000s)		Bushpigs	Peter Hastie Oval, Charles Sturt University	CRFL	1972	1982–	2	1991, 2001
Coleambally		Blues	Coleambally Sports Grounds, Coleambally	C&DFL	1965	2011–	0	–
East Wagga-Kooringal		Hawks	Gumly Oval, Gumly Gumly	RFNL	1946	1977–1981, 2010–	1	2016
Marrar		Bombers	Langtry Oval, Marrar	CRFL	1918	1982–	5	1995, 1996, 2017, 2018, 2022
North Wagga		Saints	McPherson Oval, North Wagga Wagga	RFNL	1957	1958–1981; 1985–2006; 2010–	5	1983, 1991, 1992, 1994, 2019
Northern Jets		Jets	Ardlethan Recreation Ground, Ardlethan and Ariah Park Recreation Ground, Ariah Park	–	2004	2004–	2	2005, 2007
Temora		Kangaroos	Nixon Park, Temora	CRFL, RFNL	1949	1961–1994; 2002–	4	2012, 2013, 2014, 2025
The Rock-Yerong Creek		Magpies	Victoria Park, The Rock	–	1962	1962–	10	1986, 1997, 1998, 2000, 2004, 2006, 2011, 2015, 2023, 2024

=== Hume Football Netball League ===
Club	Colours	Moniker	Home Ground(s)	Former league	Est.	Years in HFNL	HFNL Senior Premierships	
Club	Colours	Moniker	Home Ground(s)	Former league	Est.	Years in HFNL	Total	Years
Billabong Crows		Crows	Oaklands Recreation Ground, Oaklands and Urana Recreation Ground, Urana	C&DFL	2005	2008–	0	–
Brocklesby-Burrumbuttock		Saints	Brocklesby Recreation Reserve, Brocklesby and Burrumbuttock Recreation Reserve, Burrumbuttock	–	2006	2006–	4	2013, 2015, 2016, 2018
Coreen-Daysdale-Hopefield-Buraja United		Power	Coreen Oval, Coreen	C&DFL	2006	2008–	0	–
Culcairn		Lions	Culcairn Sportsground, Culcairn	T&DFL	1895	1992–	2	1993, 2007
Henty		Swans, Swampies	Henty Showground, Henty	FFL	1895	1980–	5	1984, 1986, 1990, 1996, 2014
Holbrook		Brookers	Holbrook Sports Complex, Holbrook	T&DFL	1882	1999–	2	2004, 2022
Howlong		Spiders	Howlong Oval, Howlong	C&DFL	1898	1953–	6	1954, 1971, 1977, 1997, 2002, 2010
Jindera		Bulldogs	Jindera Sports Ground, Jindera	CHFA	1900	1933–	11	1946, 1955, 1956, 1957, 1960, 1961, 1963, 1964, 1975, 2008, 2011
Lockhart		Demons	Lockhart Recreation Ground, Lockhart	FFL	1898	1982–	2	1982, 2003
Murray Magpies		Magpies	Urana Road Oval, Lavington	C&DFL	1997	2007–	0	–
Osborne		Tigers	Osborne Recreation Reserve, Osborne	CRFL	1901	1970–	18	1985, 1991, 1992, 1994, 1995, 1998, 1999, 2000, 2001, 2005, 2006, 2009, 2012, 2017, 2019, 2023, 2024, 2025
Rand-Walbundrie-Walla		Giants	Rand Recreation Reserve, Rand, Walbundrie Showground, Walbundrie and Walla Walla Sportsground, Walla Walla	–	2016	2016–	0	–

=== Millewa Football League ===
Club	Jumper	Nickname	Home Ground	Former League	Est.	Years in MFL	MFL Senior Premierships	
Club	Jumper	Nickname	Home Ground	Former League	Est.	Years in MFL	Total	Years
Gol Gol (Alcheringa 1980–98)		Hawks	Alcheringa Oval, Gol Gol	–	1980	1980–	11	1982, 1983, 1984, 1991, 1992, 1999, 2001, 2004, 2005, 2006, 2010

=== Murray Football Netball League ===
Club	Colours	Nickname	Home Ground	Former League	Est.	Years in MFNL	MFNL Senior Premierships	
Club	Colours	Nickname	Home Ground	Former League	Est.	Years in MFNL	Total	Years
Deniliquin		Rams	Hardinge Street Oval, Deniliquin	EFL	1933	1949–	14	1957, 1966, 1972, 1973, 1975, 1976, 1985, 1986, 1996, 2001, 2002, 2003, 2004, 2011
Finley		Cats	Finley Recreation Reserve, Finley	SRFL	c.1890s	1933–	7	1952, 1954, 1958, 1971, 1981, 1982, 1988
Moama		Magpies	Moama Recreation Reserve, Moama	NEFL	1892	1997–	1	2010
Mulwala		Lions	Lonsdale Reserve, Mulwala	TFL	1882	1987–	3	1990, 2022, 2023

=== Northern Riverina Football League ===
Club	Colours	Nickname	Home Ground	Former League	Est.	Years in NRFNL	NRFNL Senior Premierships	
Club	Colours	Nickname	Home Ground	Former League	Est.	Years in NRFNL	Total	Premiership Years
Hillston		Swans	Stan Peters Oval, Hillston	–	2000	2000–	4	2007, 2019, 2023, 2024
Lake Cargelligo (Lake-Burgooney 1960–71, Lake Tigers 1980–89)		Tigers	Lake Cargelligo Recreation Ground, Lake Cargelligo	–	1960	1960–	16	1962, 1963, 1964, 1965, 1969, 1970, 1971, 1973, 1976, 2002, 2003, 2006, 2008, 2010, 2012, 2025
Tullibigeal		Grasshoppers, Paddymelons	Tullibigeal Recreation Ground, Tullibigeal	–	1919	1924–	20	1933, 1938, 1946, 1947, 1948, 1951, 1953, 1955, 1957, 1958, 1968, 1975, 1981, 1982, 2004, 2013, 2014, 2016, 2017, 2018
Ungarie		Magpies, Angels	Ungarie Recreation Ground, Ungarie	–	1916	1924–	16	1935, 1950, 1956, 1959, 1960, 1961, 1974, 1978, 1979, 1983, 1985, 1986, 1999, 2000, 2001, 2015
West Wyalong-Girral (Girral 1977–83)		Bulldogs	McAlister Oval, West Wyalong	–	1977	1977–	9	1987, 1988, 1989, 1991, 1992, 1993, 2005, 2009, 2022

=== Northern Rivers Cup ===
The Northern Rivers Cup is an Australian rules football competition based in the Northern Rivers region of New South Wales. The competition was formed in early 2025 to revive football in the area, which had been somewhat fractured following the demise of the Summerland Australian Football League after the 2011 season. Five former SAFL clubs – Ballina, Byron, Casino, Lismore and Nimbin – were joined by newly-formed clubs from Brunswick Heads and Lennox Head in the inaugural season in 2025.

Club	Colours	Nickname	Home Ground	Former league	Est.	Years in NRC	NRC Senior Premierships	
Club	Colours	Nickname	Home Ground	Former league	Est.	Years in NRC	Total	Years
Ballina		Bombers	Fripp Oval, Ballina	QFA	1984	2025–	1	2025
Brunswick Heads		Bulldogs	Stan Thompson Oval, Brunswick Heads	–	2025	2025–	0	–
Byron		Magpies	Cavanbah Centre, Byron Bay	NCAFL	1984	2025–	0	–
Casino		Lions	Queen Elizabeth Park, Casino	NCAFL	2003	2025–	0	–
Lennox Head		Saints	None – based in Lennox Head	–	2025	2025–	0	–
Lismore		Swans	Gloria Mortimer Oval, Lismore	NCAFL	1984	2025–	1	2026
Nimbin		Demons	Nimbin Showgrounds, Nimbin	SAFL	1988	2025–	0	–

=== Ovens & Murray Football Netball League ===
Club	Colours	Moniker	Home ground(s)	Former league	Est.	Joined O&M	O&M Senior Premierships	
Club	Colours	Moniker	Home ground(s)	Former league	Est.	Joined O&M	Total	Most recent
Albury		Tigers	Albury Sportsground, Albury	–	1876	1896	22	2018
Corowa-Rutherglen		Roos	John Foord Oval, (Note: Played at the Barkly Park on several occasions.) Corowa	–	1979 (Note: Formed by the merger of Corowa Football Club and Rutherglen Football Club.)	1979	2	2003
Lavington		Panthers	Lavington Sports Ground, Hamilton Valley	FFL	1880s	1979	5	2019
North Albury		Hoppers	Bunton Park, North Albury	CDFL	1943	1947	6	2002

=== Picola & District Football Netball League ===
Club	Colours	Nickname	Home Ground	Former League	Est.	Years in PDFNL	PDFNL Senior Premierships	
Club	Colours	Nickname	Home Ground	Former League	Est.	Years in PDFNL	Total	Years
Barooga		Hawks	Barooga Recreation Reserve, Barooga	MFNL	1894	1959–1988, 2026–	10	1959, 1960, 1961, 1976, 1978, 1979, 1981, 1982, 1986, 1987
Berrigan		Saints	Berrigan Recreation Reserve, Berrigan	MFNL	1891	2003–	1	2011
Blighty		Redeyes	Blighty Recreation Reserve, Blighty	CDFNL	1949	1969–	4	1969, 1971, 1975, 2000
Deniliquin Rovers		Rovers	Memorial Park, Deniliquin	–	1977	1977–	0	–
Jerilderie		Demons	Jerilderie Recreation Reserve, Jerilderie	CDFNL	1891	2008–	4	2009, 2012, 2013, 2014
Mathoura		Timbercutters	Mathoura Recreation Reserve, Mathoura	EFL	1909	1990–	1	1993
Rennie		Hoppers	Rennie Recreation Reserve, Rennie	HFNL	1932	2009–	3	2011, 2017, 2018
Tocumwal		Bloods	Tocumwal Recreation Reserve, Tocumwal	MFNL	1891	2014–2022, 2024–	0	–

=== Riverina Football League ===
Club	Colours	Nickname	Home Ground	Former League	Est.	Years in RFNL	RFNL Senior Premierships	
Club	Colours	Nickname	Home Ground	Former League	Est.	Years in RFNL	Total	Years
Collingullie-Wagga (Collingullie-Ashmont-Kapooka 2011–15; Collingullie-Glenfield Park 2015–23)		Demons	Crossroads Oval, Collingullie	FFL	1998	2011–	5	2014, 2015, 2018, 2024, 2025
Coolamon Rovers		Grasshoppers	Kindra Park, Coolamon	SWDFL	1894	1982–	3	1983, 2000, 2013
Ganmain-Grong Grong-Matong		Lions	Ganmain Sports Ground, Ganmain	–	1982	1982–	12	1984, 1991, 1992, 1996, 2004, 2005, 2006, 2008, 2009, 2010, 2011, 2022
Griffith		Swans	Griffith Exies Oval, Griffith	SWDFL	1914	1982–	1	2003
Leeton-Whitton		Crows	Leeton Showgrounds, Leeton	–	1995	1995–	1	2017
Mangoplah-Cookardinia United-Eastlakes		Goannas	Mangoplah Sports Ground, Mangoplah	FFL	1955	1995–	0	–
Narrandera Imperial		Eagles	Narrandera Sportsground, Narrandera	SWDFL	1910	1982–	2	1986, 2012
Turvey Park		Bulldogs	Maher Oval, Glenfield Park	SWDFL	1954	1982–	6	1987, 1988, 1989, 1990, 2002, 2023
Wagga		Tigers	Robertson Oval, Wagga Wagga	FFL, AFLC	1928	1982–2001; 2007–	12	1985, 1993, 1994, 1995, 1997, 1998, 1999, 2001, 2007, 2016, 2019, 2020

=== Sunraysia Football Netball League ===
Club	Colours	Nickname	Home ground	Former League	Est.	Years in SFNL	SFNL Senior Premierships	
Club	Colours	Nickname	Home ground	Former League	Est.	Years in SFNL	Total	Years
Wentworth District		Roos	George Gordon Oval, Dareton	–	1956	1957–	6	1973, 1984, 1996, 2001, 2009, 2012

=== Tallangatta & District Football Netball League ===
Club	Colours	Moniker	Home Ground	Former League	Est.	Joined	TDFL Senior Premierships	
Club	Colours	Moniker	Home Ground	Former League	Est.	Joined	Total	Years
Thurgoona		Bulldogs	Thurgoona Oval, Thurgoona	–	1988	1988–	3	2016, 2017, 2019

=== Upper Murray Football Netball League ===
Club	Colours	Nickname	Home Ground	Former League	Est.	Years in UMFNL	UMFNL Senior Premierships	
Club	Colours	Nickname	Home Ground	Former League	Est.	Years in UMFNL	Total	Years
Tumbarumba		Roos	Tumbarumba Recreation Reserve, Tumbarumba	–	1969	1971–1995; 1997–	3	2012, 2013, 2022
