= 2019 AFLHCC season =

2019 premiership season
- Teams: 10
- Premiers: Terrigal-Avoca
- Minor premiers: Terrigal-Avoca
- Wooden spooners: Gosford
- Best and fairest: Andrew Scott (Singleton)
- Leading goalkicker: Izaac Hughes (Cardiff)

The 2019 AFLHCC season was the 19th season of senior Australian rules football in the Newcastle, Hunter and Central Coast regions, and the first year that the league was renamed from Black Diamond AFL to AFL Hunter Central Coast, under the AFL NSW/ACT banner.

The Grand Final was played on September 7, 2019, with Terrigal-Avoca beating Newcastle City by 10 points following their Grand Final defeat from the previous season. This is the 5th time that these two clubs have faced off in a Grand Final. The number of teams in the Black Diamond Cup (First Grade) competition was reduced to 10 teams after Lake Macquarie decided to field only one senior men's team to compete in the Black Diamond Plate (Reserves) competition after a winless 2018 season competing in the Black Diamond Cup.

The Representative Game was played on May 20 against AFL South Coast. AFL Hunter Central Coast won the game by 41 points, 12.16 (88) to 6.11 (47).

== Ladder ==
2019 AFLHCC Ladder
	TEAM	P	W	L	D	PF	PA	%	PTS
1	Terrigal-Avoca (P)	18	17	1	0	2171	544	399.08	68
2	Newcastle City	18	15	3	0	1903	712	267.28	60
3	Cardiff	18	14	4	0	1719	838	205.13	56
4	Killarney Vale	18	11	7	0	1373	1106	124.14	44
5	Singleton	18	10	8	0	1144	1465	78.09	40
6	Warners Bay	18	8	10	0	1107	1305	84.83	32
7	Maitland	18	5	13	0	837	1857	45.07	20
8	Nelson Bay	18	4	14	0	935	1861	50.24	16
9	Wyong Lakes	18	3	15	0	1049	1662	63.12	12
10	Gosford	18	3	15	0	1063	1951	54.48	12
Key: P = Played, W = Won, L = Lost, D = Drawn, PF = Points For, PA = Points Against, (P) = Premiers

== Grand Final ==
2019 Black Diamond Cup Grand Final
Saturday 7 September 2019 (2:30 pm)	Terrigal-Avoca	def.	Newcastle City	Newcastle Number 1 Sports Ground	Report
3.1 (19); 7.2 (44); 7.5 (47); 8.9 (57)	Q1; Q2; Q3; Final	2.0 (12); 3.1 (19); 6.4 (40); 7.5 (47)
This was the fifth time that both Terrigal-Avoca and Newcastle City have come up against each other in a Grand Final.; Newcastle City defeated Maitland 8.6 (54) to 3.0 (18) in the Women's Grand Final.; Terrigal-Avoca defeated The Entrance Bateau Bay 20.13 (133) to 1.5 (11) in the Black Diamond Plate (Reserves) Grand Final.
