= Wyong Lakes Australian Football Club =

Wyong Lakes

Names
- Full name: Wyong Lakes Australian Football Club
- Former name: The Lakes
- Nickname: Magpies

2025 season
- Home-and-away season: Men's Plate (3rd); Women's Plate (9th)
- Leading goalkicker: Bianca Blackhall & Alanna Nicholson (women's), Hayden Murphy (men's)
- Best and fairest: Alanna Nicholson (women's), Nathan Doyle (men's)

Club details
- Founded: 1975; 51 years ago
- Colours
- Competition: AFL Hunter Central Coast
- President: Chris Koop-Folkes
- Coach: Simon Smyth
- Premierships: 3 (1978, 1979 - CCAFL) (2014 - BDAFL 1st Division)
- Ground: Sir Don Small Oval

Uniforms
| Home | Away |

Other information
- Official website: wyong-lakes-afc.square.site

The Wyong Lakes Australian Football Club, nicknamed the Magpies, is an Australian rules football club that plays in the AFL Hunter Central Coast league in the Black Diamond Cup (Division One), and Black Diamond Plate competitions. The club is based in the Central Coast suburb of Tacoma, New South Wales.

== Club history ==
Australian rules football was introduced to the Central Coast region in the early 1970s when Gosford were founded in 1971 and joined the Newcastle Australian Football League. However, despite interest of forming a competition based on the Coast, Gosford were currently the only club in the region. After an advertisement was placed in the newspaper that served the Wyong district, the Advocate Newspaper, a meeting was held in the CWA Hall in Long Jetty in September 1975 which led to the establishment of The Lakes Australian Football Club, which is what the club was known at the time. The Lakes were one of five foundation clubs of the Central Coast Australian Football League, along with Gosford Tigers, Narara Wyoming Bulldogs, Terrigal Panthers and Woy Woy Swans. The Lakes were based at Tacoma Oval (better known as Don Small Oval, The Don), which today is their current home ground, which only had male and female toilets and a cricket pitch in the centre of the field until the late 1970s when changerooms were built.

The Lakes finished the inaugural 1976 CCAFL season in fourth spot, and made the Grand Final which they lost by 10 points to Gosford. But the favour was returned in the following Grand Final of 1978 when The Lakes beat Gosford by 10 points, and won the 1979 flag over Woy Woy.

The 1980s however, saw the end of the Magpies' success and some long losing streaks also. During that same time period, the name was changed from 'The Lakes' to 'Wyong' with very little success, being renamed again not long after to 'Wyong Lakes' to recognise the club's past and local area that the club represents.

The 1990s saw the Magpies improve on the field, with the First Grade side heading deep into the Finals series and the Reserves making the Grand Final, which they would eventually lose. Despite the club's improvement on the field, the Magpies were still unable enough to bring home another flag.

The Black Diamond Australian Football League was formed in 2000 following the merger between the Central Coast and Newcastle leagues, in which the same decade saw a decline for the Magpies, withdrawing from the Black Diamond Cup in 2001 due to increased travel time for away games in Newcastle and the departure and retirement of players. Wyong Lakes played in the Second Grade with some successful premiership seasons in 2003 and 2004, which saw them return to the Black Diamond Cup in 2005. That same year saw the club celebrate its 30th anniversary.

After some more mixed results Wyong Lakes again withdrew from the BDAFL's top flight competition to rebuild in 2012. The BDAFL introduced a third men's competition in 2014 which further helped the club build and gain new players, which resulted in a 2014 1st Division Grand Final win over Newcastle City reserves by 20 points. The Magpies again qualified for Finals in 2015 but 2016 saw them drop down to sixth spot in a ten-team competition. Wyong Lakes fielded their first Women's team in 2015 which finished 5th with 3 wins and 11 losses.

In 2015, one of the most significant steps taken by the club was to nominate a team into the maiden female competition within the Black Diamond League. No doubt history will show this to be one of the best decision taken by the club’s committee.

The 2017 season saw an improvement for Wyong Lakes, finishing as minor premiers and again qualifying for Finals before eventually bowing out to Singleton by 28 points.

2018 saw the Magpies return to the Black Diamond Cup where they finished the season 7th in an eleven-team competition.

== Premierships ==
- 1978 Central Coast Australian Football League Men
- 1979 Central Coast Australian Football League Men
- 2003 Black Diamond Australian Football League (Reserves) Men
- 2004 Black Diamond Australian Football League (Reserves) Men
- 2014 Black Diamond Australian Football League (1st Division) Men
