= Daniel Lloyd (footballer) =

Australian rules footballer

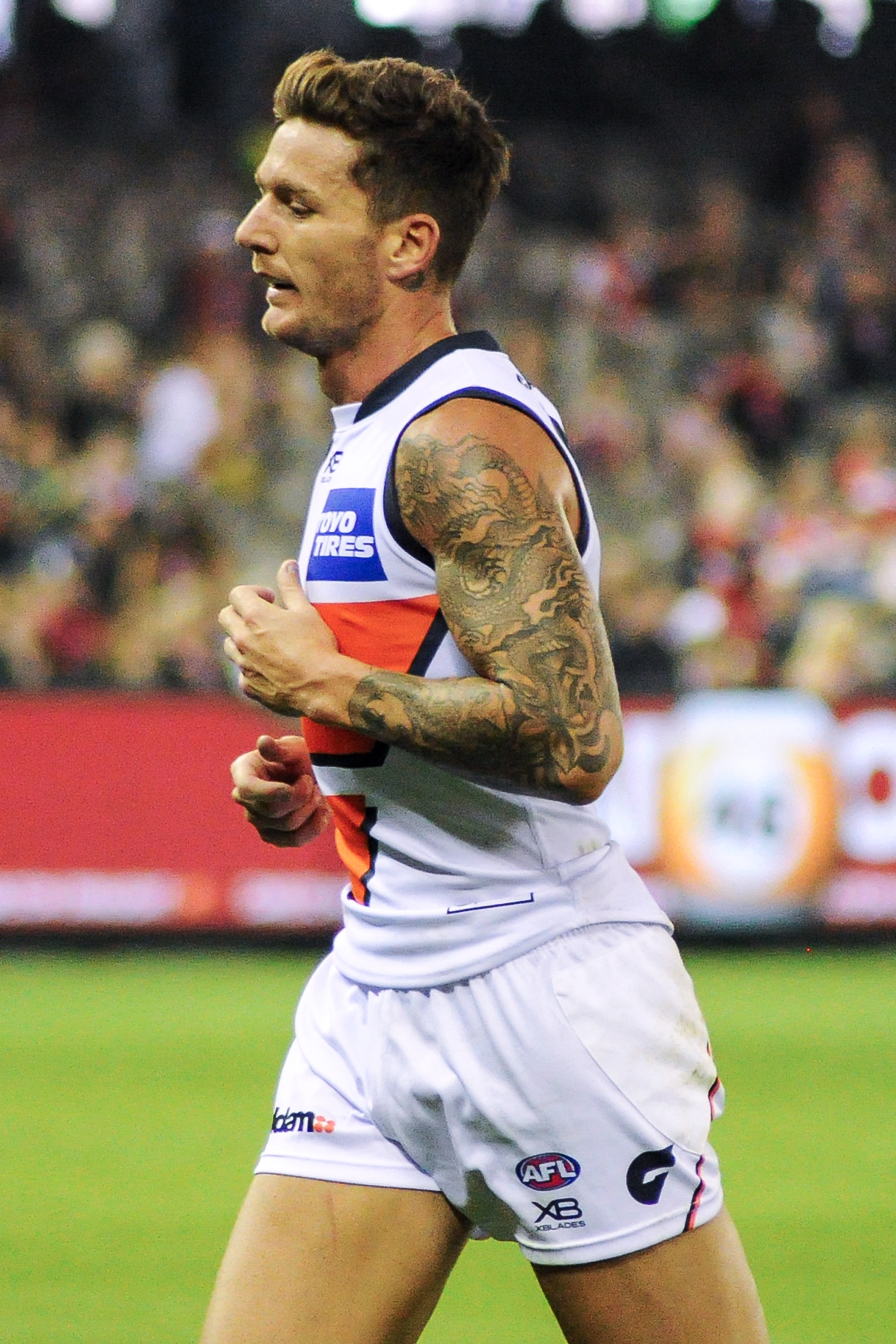
- Lloyd playing for Greater Western Sydney in April 2018

Personal information
- Full name: Daniel Lloyd
- Born: 18 February 1992 (age 34)
- Original team: Killarney Vale (BDAFL)
- Draft: No. 26, 2016 rookie draft
- Debut: Round 8, 2017, Greater Western Sydney vs. Collingwood, at Spotless Stadium
- Height: 187 cm (6 ft 2 in)
- Weight: 85 kg (187 lb)
- Position: Forward

Playing career^{1}
Years	Club	Games (Goals)
2016–2023	Greater Western Sydney	101 (75)
- ^{1} Playing statistics correct to the end of 2024.

Daniel Lloyd (born 18 February 1992) is a former professional Australian rules footballer who played for the Greater Western Sydney Giants in the Australian Football League (AFL).

== Early life ==
Lloyd grew up on the Central Coast in New South Wales and played his junior football for the Killarney Vale Bombers. A former scholarship holder with the Western Bulldogs, Lloyd (a Carpenter at the time) was spotted by Assistant Coach Mark McVeigh playing for the Killarney Vale Bombers in the Black Diamond Football League where he kicked nine goals in a semi-final for the Bombers that season and also won Killarney Vale's 2015 Best and Fairest award. He was drafted by Greater Western Sydney with their second selection and twenty-sixth overall in the 2016 rookie draft.

== AFL career ==
He made his debut in the three-point win against Collingwood at Spotless Stadium in round eight of the 2017 season.

On 17 August 2023 Lloyd announced his retirement from the AFL, effective at the end of the season.

== Statistics ==
Updated to the end of 2024.

Legend
G	Goals	K	Kicks	D	Disposals	T	Tackles
B	Behinds	H	Handballs	M	Marks

Season	Team	No.	Games	Totals							Averages (per game)						
Season	Team	No.	Games	G	B	K	H	D	M	T	G	B	K	H	D	M	T
2017	Greater Western Sydney	38	7	4	2	43	38	81	19	14	0.6	0.3	6.1	5.4	11.5	2.7	2.0
2018	Greater Western Sydney	38	14	11	10	84	81	165	39	58	0.8	0.7	6.0	5.8	11.8	2.8	4.1
2019	Greater Western Sydney	38	18	16	8	130	98	228	52	44	0.9	0.4	7.2	5.4	12.6	2.9	2.4
2020	Greater Western Sydney	38	12	7	0	74	49	123	38	28	0.6	0.0	6.2	4.1	10.3	3.2	2.3
2021	Greater Western Sydney	38	16	20	8	140	63	203	68	45	1.3	0.5	8.8	3.9	12.7	4.3	2.8
2022	Greater Western Sydney	38	11	5	6	75	31	106	39	27	0.5	0.5	6.8	2.8	9.6	3.5	2.5
2023	Greater Western Sydney	38	23	12	15	162	135	297	67	70	0.5	0.7	7.0	5.9	12.9	2.9	3.0
Career			101	75	49	708	495	1203	322	286	0.7	0.5	7.0	4.9	11.9	3.2	2.8
