= Newcastle City Australian Football Club =

Australian rules football club

Newcastle City

Names
- Full name: Newcastle City Australian Football Club
- Nickname(s): Blues

2022 season
- After finals: TBC
- Home-and-away season: Men's Cup TBC; Men's Plate TBC; Women's Cup TBC; Women's Plate TBC; Men's Shield TBC
- Best and fairest: TBC

Club details
- Founded: 1883; 142 years ago coach=Tim Cotter
- Colours
- Competition: AFL Hunter Central Coast
- President: Courtney Knight and Casey Eacott
- Captain(s): Luke Rawnsley
- Premierships: 24 (1950, 1953, 1961, 1963, 1964, 1965, 1966, 1968, 1970, 1971, 1972, 1973, 1975, 1976, 1981, 1995 - NAFL) (2003, 2008, 2009, 2010, 2011, 2013, 2016, 2018 - BDAFL)
- Ground(s): Newcastle Number 1 Sports Ground (capacity: 20,000)

Uniforms
Home	Away

The Newcastle City Australian Football Club, nicknamed the Blues, is an Australian rules football club that is based in Newcastle, New South Wales, and currently competes in the AFL Hunter Central Coast league. The club is one of the oldest and most successful clubs in the AFLHCC.

== Club history ==
Australian rules football was first introduced to the Hunter Region by Ballarat gold miners John, Jim and George Duguid in the early 1880s with the first clubs being Newcastle City, Northumberland, Wallsend & Plattsburg, Singleton and Lambton. Matches between clubs were privately organised between clubs. But despite the game's promising start in terms of gaining a foothold within the region the sport had died out due to lack of players and support due to the decline of coalmines in Newcastle and the effects of the depression at the time in the mid 1890s. The sport would be revived for a short time before dying off again on and off but it wasn't until 1948 after the end of World War II, that Australian rules was there to stay with the Newcastle Australian Football League being founded with inaugural clubs Waratah, Mayfield, Broadmeadow and Newcastle City.

The Carlton Football Club gave Newcastle City permission to use the uniform identical to their own club kit. The club won its first NAFL premiership in 1950, and again three years later in 1953. The 1960s was one of the most successful eras for Newcastle City, winning six premierships during the decade with four in a row from 1963 to 1966, with the 1964 season seeing the Blues go through undefeated. Another six more premierships came in the 1970s with 1973 being another undefeated year for the club. However, the 1980s only saw one premiership in 1981, and a 14 year premiership drought followed until Newcastle City won their last NAFL premiership in 1995.

Following the merger between the Newcastle and Central Coast leagues to form the Black Diamond Australian Football League in 2000, Newcastle City didn't find their feet within the new competition until 2003 when they captured the flag that year by beating the Cardiff Hawks by 42 points. The two sides met again three years later in a Grand Final but ultimately it would be the Hawks who would prevail. Another Grand Final loss followed in 2007, losing by 23 points to Killarney Vale. However the following season of 2008 saw another premiership win for the Blues, beating Cardiff by 37 points, and going on to win another three premierships in a row. Newcastle City missed out on the big dance in 2012 but went on to beat Terrigal-Avoca in the 2013 decider with more flags to follow in 2016 and 2018. Newcastle City played in the 2019 and 2020 grand finals going down on both occasions to Terrigal Avoca. With a total of 24 premierships, Newcastle City are the most successful club in the AFLHCC.

Newcastle City has produced an AFL Women's player, Sarah Halvorsen (Greater Western Sydney Giants).

== Premierships ==
- 1950 Newcastle Australian Football League
- 1953 Newcastle Australian Football League
- 1961 Newcastle Australian Football League
- 1963 Newcastle Australian Football League
- 1964 Newcastle Australian Football League
- 1965 Newcastle Australian Football League
- 1966 Newcastle Australian Football League
- 1968 Newcastle Australian Football League
- 1970 Newcastle Australian Football League
- 1971 Newcastle Australian Football League
- 1972 Newcastle Australian Football League
- 1973 Newcastle Australian Football League
- 1975 Newcastle Australian Football League
- 1976 Newcastle Australian Football League
- 1981 Newcastle Australian Football League
- 1995 Newcastle Australian Football League
- 2003 Black Diamond Australian Football League
- 2008 Black Diamond Australian Football League
- 2009 Black Diamond Australian Football League
- 2010 Black Diamond Australian Football League
- 2011 Black Diamond Australian Football League
- 2013 Black Diamond Australian Football League
- 2016 Black Diamond Australian Football League
- 2018 Black Diamond Australian Football League
