= Cardiff Australian Football Club =

Australian rules football club

Cardiff

Names
- Full name: Cardiff Australian Football Club
- Nickname: Hawks
- Motto: The Family Club
- Club song: "We play for Cardiff, we're on the run"

2022 season
- After finals: Men's Cup - 3rd Men's Plate - 6th Women's Cup - 3rd Women's Plate - 2nd
- Home-and-away season: Men's Cup - 3rd Men's Plate - 6th Women's Cup - 2nd Women's Plate - 1st
- Best and fairest: TBC

Club details
- Founded: 1967; 58 years ago
- Colours
- Competition: AFL Hunter Central Coast
- President: Matthew Plumridge
- Coach: Danny Priest (Men's Cup); Grant Keeble (Women's Cup); Brad Stummer (Men's Plate); Jeremy Kocon (Women's Plate)
- Captain: Jack Pratt/Emma Hieke
- Premierships: 8 1st Grade Premierships 1969 (reserve grade), 1979, 1980, 1998 - NAFL 2002, 2004, 2005, 2006 - BDAFL
- Ground: Pasterfield Sports Complex, Horizon Avenue, Cameron Park
- Former ground: List: Maneela Park, Glendale; Hillsborough Oval, Hillsborough; Bill Elliott Oval, Maryland

Uniforms
Home	Away

Other information
- Official website: cardiffhawks.com.au

The Cardiff Australian Football Club, nicknamed the Hawks, is an Australian rules football club based in the City of Lake Macquarie suburb of Cameron Park, New South Wales, and currently plays in the AFL Hunter Central Coast competition.

== History ==
The club was established on 14 November 1967 at a meeting at the Evans Oval Soccer Hall by former pupils at the Cardiff High school. They first began playing football in 1968 entering a team in the Newcastle Australian Football League Reserve grade competition. In their first season they had finished runners up, losing the Grand Final by just one point. After winning the premiership the following year in 1969, Cardiff was added to the league's First Grade competition. At the time the club was playing on a field which is now known today as McDonald Jones Stadium.

Cardiff improved quickly within the First Grade competition, making their first Grand Final in 1974 despite losing to RAAF. In 1978 the Hawks moved to their new home ground of Maneela Park in Glendale. Under the coaching of former Glenelg footballer Neil Davis, Cardiff won their first NAFL First Grade premiership over Newcastle City, and went on to win the following year in 1980 after lasting the entire season undefeated. Cardiff finished runners up in the following 1981 and 1982 seasons, losing both Grand Finals to Newcastle City and Western Suburbs. However, this would see a premiership drought lasting for 18 years until 1998 when a year after they finished runners up again, this time to Nelson Bay, they capped off another undefeated season to win the premiership.

After both the Newcastle and Central Coast leagues merged to form the Black Diamond Australian Football League in 2000, Cardiff were seen as one of the more stronger clubs inn the league early on, despite losing both the 2000 and 2001 Grand Finals to Terrigal-Avoca and West Newcastle-Wallsend. The Hawks won the 2002 premiership and went on to win the 2004, 2005 and 2006 flags but after 2007 saw a Grand Final losing streak that lasted from 2008 to 2012. 2006 saw the club lose Maneela Park, which resulted in seniors playing at Bill Elliott Oval and juniors at Hillsborough Oval. Cardiff's most recent First Grade Grand Final appearance was in 2017 where they lost to Terrigal-Avoca by 9 points.

Cardiff fielded their first Women's team in 2016 that finished their inaugural season 4th with 11 wins and 4 losses. In 2021, Cardiff introduced a second women's team which will compete in the Plate division.

Cardiff has produced one Australian Football League player, Isaac Heeney who was drafted by Sydney Swans in the 2014 AFL National Draft.

== Honour Board ==
Premierships
1st Grade	Reserve Grade	Under 18s	U/10s	U/11s	U/12s	U/13s	U/14s	U/15s	U/16s	U/17s	U/17s Girls
1979	1969	2005	2006	2019	2002	2014	2005	2013	2006	1976	2016
1980 ^{^}	1972	2008			2004	2015	2006		2008^{^}	1981	2019
1998 ^{^}	1976	2009			2005	2020	2007		2010	1988	2020
2002	1980	2010			2006		2008^{^}			1989	
2004	1985				2008		2009			1996	
2005	1986						2011			1997	
2006	2001						2012				
	2011										
	2017 ^{#}										
	2020 ^{^}										

^{^} Undefeated season

^{#} 2nd Division

Best and Fairest
Year	Men's 1st Grade	Men's Reserve Grade	Men's U18 Grade	Men's 3rd Grade	Women's 1st Grade	Women's Reserve Grade
1973		Geoffery Sheean				
1974		Paul Redman				
1975		Michael Storck				
1976		Klaus Richter				
1977		Klaus Richter				
1978	John Reinhardt					
1979	Klaus Richter					
1980	Steve Raw					
1981	Ben Jansen					
1982	Ben Jansen					
1983	Ben Jansen					
1984	Ben Jansen					
1985	Ben Jansen					
1986	Keith White					
1987	Geoff Rock					
1988	Keith White					
1989	John Hislop					
1990	Mark Roberts					
1991	Troy Baylis					
1992	Michael Gillard					
1993	Troy Baylis					
1994	Glen Crowe					
1995	Steve McCarten					
1996	Ross Hughes					
1997	Troy Baylis					
1998	Ricky Roberts					
1999	David Flynn					
2000	Troy Baylis					
2001	David Flynn					
2002	Brendan Wold					
2003	Shawn Simpson					
2004	Michael Ryan					
2005	David Flynn					
2006	Luke Orton					
2007	Adam Clarke					
2008	Adam Clarke	Nathan Pearson	Wade Beard/Sam Brasington			
2009	Tim Sheldon	Dustin Spriggs	Matthew White			
2010	Simon O'Brien	Shane Williams	Jack Pratt/Sam Haigh			
2011	Adam Clarke	James Foot	Rhys Dintino			
2012	Simon O'Brien	Josh McLeod				
2013	Liam Gibson	Tim Brown				
2014	Simon O'Brien	Simon Williams		Michael Krake		
2015	Tim Sheldon	Andrew Risby		Tony Edser		
2016	Max Hillier	Jason Adlington			Eliza Bunner	
2017	Tom Yensch	John O'Regan			Mollie Palmer	
2018	Bryce Graetz	Michael Ryan & Callum Spoor			Taylah Wilks	
2019	Simon O'Brien	Max Kozlik			Matisse Coram-Parker	
2020	Izaac Hughes	David Graan & Jared Campbell			Danika Spamer	
2021						
2022						
2023						

Club Presidents
Year	Name	Year	Name	Year	Name	Year	Name	Year	Name	Year	Name
1968	Horrie Northey	1978	Bob Simcoe	1988	Alan White	1998	Chris Arnold	2008	Peter Risby	2018	Quinton Davis
1969	Clive Gerrish	1979	John Reinhardt	1989	Alan White	1999	Chris Arnold	2009	Peter Risby	2019	Damian Charleson
1970	Clive Gerrish	1980	John Reinhardt	1990	Alan White	2000	Paul Redman	2010	Peter Risby	2020	Warren Lovell
1971	Clive Gerrish	1981	Bob Simcoe	1991	Roy Reichert	2001	Paul Redman	2011	Peter Risby	2021	Warren Lovell
1972	Clive Gerrish	1982	Kieran Lister	1992	Roy Reichert	2002	Paul Redman	2012	Callan Buchan	2022	Matthew Plumridge
1973	Clive Gerrish	1983	Kieran Lister	1993	Roy Reichert	2003	Henry Kocon	2013	Brendan Bailey	2023	Matthew Plumridge
1974	Lee Northey	1984	Michael Storck	1994	David Fowler & Shane Jones	2004	Michael Gray	2014	Brendan Bailey		
1975	John Sullivan	1985	Michael Storck	1995	Shane Jones	2005	Michael Gray	2015	Mathew Musilak		
1976	Ric P Gregory	1986	Michael Storck	1996	Chris Arnold	2006	Michael Gray	2016	Quinton Davis		
1977	Bob Simcoe	1987	Alan White	1997	Chris Arnold	2007	Paul Redman	2017	Quinton Davis		

Life Members
Name	Reason	Year Inducted
Troy Baylis	200+ Games	2017
Shawn Simpson	200+ Games	2017
Shane Williams	200+ Games	2017
Ryan Sneddon	200+ Games	2017
Paul Cooksley	200+ Games	2017
Nick Kocon	200+ Games	2017
Liam Gibson	200+ Games	2017
Ken Saxby	200+ Games	2017
Jeremy Kocon	200+ Games	2017
Greg Walker	200+ Games	2017
Glenn Summers	200+ Games	2017
Brendan Wold	200+ Games	2017
Ben Stewart	200+ Games	2017
Andrew Risby	200+ Games	2017
Peter Risby	10+ years Service	2017
Brian Page	10+ years Service	2017
Quinton Davis	200+ Games	2019
Adam Clarke	10+ years Service	2019
Wayne Reid	10+ years Service	2020

Games Played Top 6
Name	Games played
Adam Dugan	367
Nick Kocon	333
Paul Redman	329
Brian Phillips	327
Liam Gibson	318
Glenn Summers	307

League/AFL Awards
Year	Name	Award	Comments
2000	Troy Baylis	Elliot Davey Medal	First Grade B&F
2000	Cardiff Hawks	Club Championship	
2001	Shawn Simpson	Elliot Davey Medal	First Grade B&F
2001	Christan David	Chris Arnold Medal	Reserve Grade B&F
2002	David Healey	Black Diamond Cup Leading Goalkicker	102 goals
2003	Phillip Jauncy	Under 18 Best and Fairest	
2003	Nick Kocon	Under 18 Sporting Pulse Player Award	
2004	Cardiff Hawks	Club Championship	
2004	Cardiff Hawks	Club Administration Award	
2005	Tom Biviano	Reserve Grade Leading Goalkicker	
2005	Murray White	Under 18 Leading Goalkicker	
2005	Cardiff Hawks	Club Championship	
2005	Cardiff Hawks	Club Administration Award	
2006	Michael Ryan	Black Diamond Cup Leading Goalkicker	92 goals
2006	Michael Ryan	Carlton Draught Player of The Year	
2006	Cardiff Hawks	Club Administration Award	
2007	Tim Sheldon	Elliot Davey Medal	First Grade B&F
2008	Michael Ryan	Black Diamond Cup Leading Goalkicker	108 goals
2008	Cardiff Hawks	Club Championship	
2009	Cardiff Hawks	Club Championship	
2010	Michael Ryan	Black Diamond Cup Leading Goalkicker	72 goals
2010	Michael Ryan	Coach of The Year	
2010	Matthew White	Under 18 Leading Goalkicker	54 goals
2010	Cardiff Hawks	Club Championship	
2011	James Foot	Granland Medal	Reserve Grade B&F
2011	Paul Redman	James Arnold Volunteer of The Year	
2011	Cardiff Hawks	Club Administration Award	
2012	Isaac Heeney	Alan McLean Medal	National Carnival B&F
2012	Isaac Heeney	Most Outstanding Young Footballer	
2012	Isaac Heeney	Jim Stynes Scholarship	
2014	Isaac Heeney	Rising Star	
2014	Isaac Heeney	TAC Cup Team of The Year	
2014	Isaac Heeney	Harrison Medal	TAC Cup B&F
2014	Isaac Heeney	Under 18 All Australian	
2014	Micahel Krake	Chris Arnold Medal	Reserve Grade B&F
2015	Max Hillier	Rising Star	
2016	Max Hillier	Most Outstanding Young Footballer	
2017	Tom Yensch	Elliot Davey Medal	First Grade B&F
2017	Marcus De Leur	Black Diamond Cup Coaches MVP	
2017	Michael Ryan	Reserve Grade Leading Goalkicker	
2017	Josh Murphy	Reserve Grade Leading Goalkicker	
2018	Lachlan Price	Rising Star	
2018	Taylah Wilks	Rising Star	
2018	Michael Ryan	Black Diamond Plate Leading Goalkicker	
2018	Miles Petersen	Grand final 400m Winner	
2019	Izaac Hughes	Maurice Goolagong Trophy	58 Goals
2019	Eloise Petersen	Rising Star	
2019	Izaac Hughes	Grand final 100m Sprint Winner	
2019	Jaden Newton	Under 13 John Holmquest Trophy	Best and Fairest
2020	David Graan	Chris Arnold Medal	Reserve Grade B&F
2020	Brendan Wold	Reserve Grade Leading Goalkicker	25 Goals
2020	Danika Spamer	Rising Star	
2020	Billy Jo Towers	Rookie of The Year	
2020	Danika Spamer	Rookie of The Year	
2020	Danika Spamer	Women's Best and Fairest	
2020	Max King	Under 13 John Holmquest Trophy	Best and Fairest
2020	Tameka Chambers	Under 13 Girls Best and Fairest	
