= Terrigal-Avoca Australian Football Club =

Terrigal-Avoca

Names
- Full name: Terrigal-Avoca Australian Football Club
- Nickname: Panthers

2025 season
- After finals: Men's Cup Premiers; Men's Plate Semi Finals; Women's Cup Elimination Final
- Home-and-away season: Men's Cup 3rd Men's Plate 2nd Women's Cup 4th Women's Plate 11th
- Best and fairest: TBC

Club details
- Founded: 1976; 50 years ago
- Colours
- Competition: Black Diamond Australian Football League
- President: Scott Murray
- Coach: Chris Bishop
- Captain: James Webster
- Premierships: 16 (1976, 1988, 1989, 1990, 1991, 1994, 1996, 1999 - CCAFL) (2000, 2012, 2014, 2015, 2017, 2019, 2020, 2025 - BDAFL/AFLHCC)
- Ground: Hylton Moore Oval, East Gosford
- Former ground: Heazlett Park, Avoca Beach
- Training ground: Hylton Moore Oval

Uniforms
Home	Away

Other information
- Official website: panthers.org.au

The Terrigal-Avoca Australian Football Club, nicknamed the Panthers, is an Australian rules football club based in East Gosford, New South Wales, Australia. The Panthers play in the AFL Hunter Central Coast competition.

== Club history ==
The TAAFC was founded in 1976 and was a founding member of the former Central Coast Australian Football League. The club's search for players to field their inaugural team included eight players from Gosford who had just recently departed from the CCAFL's sister league, the Newcastle Australian Football League, in 1975. The Panthers saw success early, winning the inaugural CCAFL premiership in a closely fought win over Gosford. After 1976, the club saw a 12-year premiership drought but 1988 saw a new era of success for the Panthers as they managed to win four premierships in a row from 1988 to 1991. Terrigal-Avoca took out the 1994 and 1996 premierships and still continued to be a force onward from 1999 when they beat Killarney Vale in the final CCAFL grand final before both the Central Coast and Newcastle leagues merged to form the Black Diamond Australian Football League, now known as AFL Hunter Central Coast.

Terrigal-Avoca won the inaugural BDAFL premiership in 2000 beating Cardiff 17.16.118 to 10.18.78. There then followed another prolonged premiership drought for 12 years when the 2012 grand final was won over Cardiff in the Hawks' fifth consecutive grand final loss. The Panthers lost to Newcastle City the following year in 2013 but then came back to being one of the league's strongest teams by beating Killarney Vale in the 2014 grand final and again in 2015 accounting for Newcastle City winning 14.9.93 to 10.11.71. 2016 saw Terrigal-Avoca's fifth straight grand final appearance but ultimately ended in disappointment as Newcastle City won the premiership but the tides turned again in 2017 when the Panthers beat Cardiff by 9 points but lost the most recent grand final of 2018.

Terrigal-Avoca still continue to field junior and senior teams in Central Coast Junior AFL and the BDAFL and are regarded as the most successful club on the Central Coast.

== Premierships ==
- CCAFL: 1976, 1988, 1989, 1990, 1991, 1994, 1996, 1999
- BDAFL/AFLHCC: 2000, 2012, 2014, 2015, 2017, 2019, 2020, 2025

== Club Symbols ==
Terrigal-Avoca currently field senior teams in the Black Diamond Cup (1st Grade), Black Diamond Plate (Reserves) and fielded a Women's team for the first time in 2018. The club also fields junior teams in Auskick, U9s, U11s, U12s, U14s, U15s, U17s, U12 Youth Girls, U14 Youth Girls and U17 Youth Girls.

Milestone banners for Players at Terrigal-Avoca can be found at footybanners.com here: Terrigal-Avoca Footy Banners
