= AFL NSW/ACT =

AFL NSW/ACT is the trading name of the AFL (NSW/ACT) Commission Limited, a wholly owned and controlled subsidiary of the Australian Football League Limited (AFL), established in 1999. Despite its name referring to NSW and the ACT, its registered office is the AFL's office in Melbourne at Docklands, Victoria. It is not representative of or accountable to Australian Football clubs in NSW and the ACT. AFL NSW/ACT controls the AFL's programs in New South Wales and the Australian Capital Territory.

In 1994, the AFL attempted to amalgamate the NSW and ACT competitions, a move which was strongly resisted by the A.C.T. Australian Football League (ACT AFL) and the ACT government. In 1995, the AFL Commission reached an agreement with the New South Wales Australian Football League Ltd (NSW AFL) to establish the NSW-ACT Australian Football Development Foundation. The AFL later assumed governance over New South Wales, leading to the demise of the independent NSW AFL. In 1998, the AFL (NSW/ACT) Commission took over operations of the ACT AFL forming AFL NSW/ACT in 1999.

== See also ==
- Sport in the Australian Capital Territory
