= Central Coast Australian Football League =

The Central Coast Australian Football League was an Australian rules football league based in the Central Coast region of New South Wales, Australia that was active from 1976 until 1999.

The CCAFL was founded in 1976 when interest of Australian rules football began developing on the Central Coast, a region just north of Sydney, although the sport in the region was played earlier. The Gosford Australian Football Club was founded in 1971, the first and oldest Aussie rules club on the Central Coast, and played in the Newcastle Australian Football League and played their first season in 1972, fielding teams in First and Second grades. It remained there until 1975 when it was decided that the Central Coast needed its own Australian rules football competition.

The competition began in 1976 and consisted of 5 teams: Gosford, Narara-Wyoming, Terrigal, The Lakes and Woy Woy. The number of teams continued to grow from 1978 when Killarney Vale were founded and joined the league, playing their first season the same year. Narara disbanded the following year, in 1979. Killarney Vale split to form Bateau Bay in 1984. That same year also saw Gosford Wyoming split up to form Wyoming. Although Bateau Bay remained as a separate club, Wyoming would join back up with Gosford in 1986. North Central Coast, known as the Kangaroos, joined in 1995 and folded after the 1996 season. The number of teams rose from 5 to 8 in 19 years, each club supporting junior and senior teams in different age groups.

After the 1999 season, the league merged with the Newcastle Australian Football League to form the Black Diamond Australian Football League (now called the Hunter Central Coast Australian Football League).

Logo of the Central Coast Australian Football League

== Clubs ==
=== Final Clubs ===
Club	Colours	Nickname	Home Ground	Former League	Est.	Years in CCAFL	CCAFL Senior Premierships		Fate
Club	Colours	Nickname	Home Ground	Former League	Est.	Years in CCAFL	Total	Years	Fate
Bateau Bay		Blues	Bateau Bay Sports Facility, Bateau Bay	–	1984	1984-1999	2	1993, 1995	Only fielded under 18s in 1999. Formed Black Diamond AFL in 2000
Gosford (Gosford-Wyoming 1980-83)		Tigers	Garnet Adcock Memorial Park, West Gosford	NAFL	1971	1976-1999	4	1977, 1980, 1983, 1984	Formed Black Diamond AFL in 2000
Killarney Vale		Bombers	Adelaide Street Oval, Killarney Vale	–	1978	1978-1999	6	1981, 1982, 1986, 1987, 1997, 1998	Formed Black Diamond AFL in 2000
Terrigal-Avoca		Panthers	Hylton Moore Oval, East Gosford	–	1976	1976-1999	8	1976, 1988, 1989, 1990, 1991, 1994, 1996, 1999	Formed Black Diamond AFL in 2000
Woy Woy Peninsula (Peninsula Swans)		Swans	Rogers Park, Woy Woy	–	1976	1976-1999	2	1985, 1992	Formed Black Diamond AFL in 2000
Wyong Lakes (The Lakes 1975-mid 80s)		Magpies	Don Small Oval, Tacoma	–	1975	1976-1999	2	1978, 1979	Formed Black Diamond AFL in 2000

=== Former Clubs ===
Club	Colours	Nickname	Home Ground	Former League	Est.	Years in CCAFL	CCAFL Senior Premierships		Fate
Club	Colours	Nickname	Home Ground	Former League	Est.	Years in CCAFL	Total	Years	Fate
Narara-Wyoming		Bulldogs		–	1976	1976-1979	0	-	Merged with Gosford to form Gosford-Wyoming following 1979 season
North Central Coast		Kangaroos		–	1995	1995-1996	0	-	Folded after 1996 season

== Central Coast Australian Football League Premierships ==
Year	Premiers
1976	Terrigal 9.19.73 def Gosford 9.10.64
1977	Gosford 10.14.77 def The Lakes 8.16.64
1978	The Lakes 11.14.80 def Gosford 8.10.58
1979	The Lakes 17.17.119 def Woy Woy 14.12.96
1980	Gosford Wyoming 14.14.98 def Killarney Vale 8.13.61
1981	Killarney Vale 16.21.117 def Gosford Wyoming 10.15.75
1982	Killarney Vale 16.11.107 def Gosford Wyoming 11.8.74
1983	Gosford Wyoming 9.18.72 def Killarney Vale 10.8.68
1984	Gosford 26.21.171 def Woy Woy 14.15.99
1985	Woy Woy 21.11.137 def Killarney Vale 15.9.99
1986	Killarney Vale 28.17.185 def Gosford Wyoming 9.17.71
1987	Killarney Vale 18.11.119 def Terrigal 16.13.109
1988	Terrigal 15.8.108 def Gosford Wyoming 11.14.80
1989	Terrigal 12.15.87 def Gosford Wyoming 6.9.45
1990	Terrigal 24.21.165 def Killarney Vale 6.7.43
1991	Terrigal 14.19.103 def Peninsular Swans 9.11.65
1992	Peninsula Swans 28.22.190 def Killarney Vale 11.10.76
1993	Bateau Bay 13.16.94 def Terrigal 11.10.76
1994	Terrigal 14.10.94 def Bateau Bay 7.13.55
1995	Bateau Bay 12.10.82 def Terrigal 11.15.81
1996	Terrigal-Avoca 9.17.71 def Bateau Bay 6.10.46
1997	Killarney Vale 16.18.114 def Gosford Wyoming 11.4.70
1998	Killarney Vale 18.16.124 def Terrigal-Avoca 11.6.72
1999	Terrigal-Avoca 16.22.118 def Killarney Vale 8.6.54

Onward from 2000, all Premiers are listed under the Black Diamond Australian Football League.

== See also ==
- Australian rules football in New South Wales
- Newcastle Australian Football League
- Black Diamond Australian Football League
