= AFL Hunter Central Coast =

Australian rules football competition

- Sport: Australian rules football
- Founded: 2000; 26 years ago
- No. of teams: 14
- Country: Australia
- Most recent champion: Newcastle City (2026)
- Most titles: Newcastle City (11 premierships)
- Broadcaster: The Seen Production Co
- Sponsors: Belmont 16s, Six Strings Brewing Co, S-Trend
- Website: aflhuntercentralcoast.com.au

The AFL Hunter Central Coast is an Australian rules football competition in the Newcastle, Hunter Region and Central Coast regions of New South Wales.

The Black Diamond Australian Football league was formed in 2000 from the merger of the Newcastle Australian Football League (founded 1886) and the Central Coast Australian Football League (founded 1976) and ran until the end of the 2018 season. Following the end of the 2018 season, the league was disbanded and a new league under the AFL NSW/ACT banner was formed; AFL Hunter Central Coast (AFLHCC). Teams in the AFLHCC's top division still play for the Black Diamond Cup.

The competition is technically Hunter Central Coast's division of the New South Wales Australian Football League.

== History ==
=== Foundation of Black Diamond Australian Football League ===
The league was formed in 2000 from a merger of the Newcastle Australian Football League (founded 1886) and the Central Coast Australian Football League (founded 1976).

The proposition of an alternate competition started from rumblings during the 1990s that both competitions were dreadfully uneven and it was generally considered the administration, although keen and resolute, was far from what was needed to sustain a viable football league/s.

Visits from AFL executives to both the Newcastle and Central Coast took place during the 1999 season where they addressed meetings of delegates to look at alternatives to their contemporary competitions. It turns out these people were more interested in a proposed regional Club to participate in the Sydney Competition.

This proposal didn't address the concerns of the general situation of the local competitions. As there was no follow-up by the AFL both boards issued invitations to senior officials of all clubs to discuss the options for the future. A meeting was held at Mt Penang, Kariong in October 1999 where it was decided to merge both leagues to create a stronger more balanced competition.

The name "Black Diamond AFL" was derived from the Black Diamond Cup which has been awarded to the Newcastle AFL Premiers since 1888.

=== League development ===
The Black Diamond AFL were successful in winning the Southern NSW AFL Championships in 2007, defeating the Riverina Football League.

In 2008 both Woy Woy and Singleton were removed from the First Grade competition and Lake Macquarie Crows were promoted to First Grade, meaning nine clubs competed for the premiership.

In 2011, Singleton returned to first grade, after winning the reserve premierships for 2009 and 2010. Nelson Bay however will only compete in Reserve Grade. Woy Woy, now known as the Peninsula Swans, will compete as a joint venture with the Gosford Tigers, allowing players at both clubs to compete in First Grade, Reserve Grade and Under 18s in 2011.

Gosford left the league in 2012, competing in the Sydney AFL for the next four seasons, before returning to the BDAFL in 2016.

The Maitland Saints also entered a senior side in 2012. From 2012, the competition was restructured to allowed clubs to enter teams across Premier, 1st, 2nd and 3rd divisions. This allowed smaller or newer clubs to field their firsts against the reserves or even third senior side of the stronger clubs.

Further clubs have joined the league in recent years, including Muswellbrook Cats and The Entrance Bateau Bay both entering senior sides 2014. Muswellbrook had competed from 1988 until 1994 in the Newcastle AFL, and then later in the Tamworth AFL until 2013.

A women's competition started in 2015. Wyong Lakes was the first and only Central Coast club to enter the inaugural women's competition, along with Hunter-based clubs Newcastle City, Nelson Bay, Maitland, Warners Bay and Lake Macquarie. Killarney Vale and Gosford fielded their inaugural women's teams the following year. In 2018 the Ladypies, as the team came to be known, became the first and only Central Coast team to make the grand final in the women's competition.

In 2018, junior club Port Stephens fielded a Women's team, their first senior team in the club's history and Wallsend was revived as Wallsend-West Newcastle and fielded a team in the Women's competition and a team in the Black Diamond Plate.

=== AFL Hunter Central Coast: 2019- ===
The league was renamed AFL Hunter Central Coast following the conclusion of the 2018 season under the banner of AFL NSW/ACT.

The 2019 season saw Lake Macquarie, with only one senior team, drop down to Black Diamond Plate (Reserves) and Nelson Bay was also reduced to just one senior team but still continued to play in the Black Diamond Cup. Newcastle City also fielded one women's team that same year, as the club had previously fielded two women's teams for two years.

2020 saw the league indefinitely suspended due to the 2019-20 coronavirus pandemic. Originally intending to start on April 4, the pandemic prevented football from going ahead in the region until July 18. The league was restructured with two women's divisions, respectively named Black Diamond Cup and Plate Women's, and a third men's competition, the Black Diamond Shield, introduced. The Black Diamond Plate will now consist of Terrigal-Avoca and Newcastle City's reserves sides and clubs with a single men's team with the Black Diamond Shield being the reserves competition for the rest of the clubs. Both Nelson Bay and Port Stephens are fielding a women's team as a joint venture for the 2020 season.

In late June 2021, the AFL Hunter Central Coast announced that all senior competitions, Central Coast and Hunter combined junior competitions and Central Coast-based junior competitions would cease due to the rapidly increasing number of coronavirus cases across the region, as the Central Coast was classed as part of Greater Sydney at the time. Round 10 was the last official round for the senior season with Central Coast and Hunter clubs competing. Although informal senior matches between Hunter-based clubs and Hunter-based junior competitions were able to continue, the uncertainty of the coronavirus outbreak across the Hunter region in early August eventually saw all Hunter community senior and junior competitions ceased for 2021.

In Early 2026, the AFL Hunter Central Coast announced that the University of Newcastle AFC would enter the senior competition in the 2026 Season. This will mean the league will move into a 14 team league in the Womens' Plate and Mens' Shield. The University of Newcastle AFC will be known as the Seahorses, a nod to the institution's coat-of-arms. They are the first new club to join the AFLHCC since the former Black Diamond Seniors, Hunter Juniors and Central Coast Juniors amalgamated in 2018.

== Clubs ==
=== Locations ===
Locations of the AFL Hunter Central Coast clubs. Red = Men's Cup; yellow = Men's Plate; blue = junior; black = in recess for 2025

=== Current ===
==== Senior ====
Club	Colours	Nickname	Home Ground	Senior Teams	Former League	Est.	Years in HCCAFL	HCCAFL Senior Premierships	
Club	Colours	Nickname	Home Ground	Senior Teams	Former League	Est.	Years in HCCAFL	Total	Years
Top Grade
Cardiff		Hawks	Pasterfield Sports Complex, Cameron Park	MC, MP, WC, WP	NAFL	1967	2000-	4	2002, 2004, 2005, 2006
Killarney Vale		Bombers	Adelaide Street Oval, Killarney Vale	MC, MP, MS, WC, WP	CCAFL	1978	2000-	2	2007, 2022
Maitland		Saints	Max McMahon Oval, Rutherford	MC, MP, WC	–	2007	2012-	1	2017
Nelson Bay		Marlins	Dick Burwell Oval, Nelson Bay	MC, WC	NAFL	1980	2000-	2	2013, 2022
Newcastle City		Blues	Newcastle No. 1 Sportsground, Newcastle West	MC, MP, MS, WC, WP x2	NAFL	1883	2000-	11	2003, 2008, 2009, 2010, 2011, 2013, 2016, 2018, 2023, 2024, 2026
Terrigal-Avoca		Panthers	Hylton Moore Oval, East Gosford	MC, MP, WC, WP	CCAFL	1976	2000-	8	2000, 2012, 2014, 2015, 2017, 2019, 2020, 2025
The Entrance Bateau Bay		Blues	Bateau Bay Sports Facility, Bateau Bay	MC, MP, WC	CCAFL	1983	2014-	1	2016
Warners Bay		Bulldogs	Feighan Oval, Warners Bay	MC, MP, WC, WP	NAFL	1974	2000-	0	-
Wyong Lakes		Magpies	Don Small Oval, Tacoma	MC, MS, WP	CCAFL	1975	2000-	1	2014
Lower Grades
Lake Macquarie		Dockers	Tulkaba Park, Teralba	MP, WP	–	1997	2003-	0	-
Muswellbrook		Cats	Weeraman Fields, Muswellbrook	MS, WP	NWAFL	1988	2014-2023, 2025-	0	-
Port Stephens		Power	Ferodale Park, Medowie	MS, WP	–	1999	2017-	0	-
Singleton		Roosters	Rose Point Park, Singleton	MP, WP	NAFL	1982	2006-	3	2010, 2012, 2016
University of Newcastle		Seahorses	Connolly Park, Carrington	MS, WP	–	2026	2026-	0	-

==== Juniors only ====
Club	Colours	Nickname	Home Ground	Est.	Years in HCCJAFL
Niagara Park Ourimbah		Dockers	Paddy Clifton Oval, Narara	1999	1999-2022, 2024-
Northern Giants		Giants	Northlakes Oval, San Remo	2020	2020-
Saratoga		Hawks	Garnet Adcock Memorial Park, West Gosford	2001	2001-

=== Former ===
Club	Colours	Nickname	Home Ground	Former League	Est.	Years in HCCAFL	HCCAFL Senior Premierships		Fate
Club	Colours	Nickname	Home Ground	Former League	Est.	Years in HCCAFL	Total	Years	Fate
Gosford	(2000-?)(?-2024)	Tigers	Garnet Adcock Memorial Park, West Gosford	CCAFL, SAFL	1971	2000-2011, 2016-2024	0	-	Folded after 2024 season
Wallsend-West Newcastle		Swans	Bill Elliott Oval, Maryland	–	2018	2018-2022	0	-	Folded after 2022 season
West Newcastle-Wallsend		Demons	Hawkins Oval, Wickham	–	2000	2000-2002	1	2001	Folded after 2002 season
Woy Woy Peninsula		Swans	Rogers Park, Woy Woy	CCAFL	1976	2000-2007	1	2006	Folded after 2007 season

== Men's BDAFL/AFLHCC Premiers ==
Year	Premiers	Score	Runners Up
2000	Terrigal-Avoca	17.16 (118) - 10.18 (78)	Cardiff
2001	West Newcastle-Wallsend	21.9 (135) - 18.13 (121)	Cardiff
2002	Cardiff	11.15 (81) - 7.10 (52)	Terrigal-Avoca
2003	Newcastle City	17.16 (118) - 11.10 (76)	Cardiff
2004	Cardiff	16.13 (109) - 15.9 (99)	Terrigal-Avoca
2005	Cardiff	17.11 (113) - 11.6 (72)	Killarney Vale
2006	Cardiff	8.9 (57) - 2.4 (16)	Newcastle City
2007	Killarney Vale	9.9 (63) - 4.17 (41)	Newcastle City
2008	Newcastle City	14.12 (96) - 8.11 (59)	Cardiff
2009	Newcastle City	12.15 (87) - 11.14 (80)	Cardiff
2010	Newcastle City	17.21 (123) - 10.12 (72)	Cardiff
2011	Newcastle City	14.20 (104) - 10.11 (71)	Cardiff
2012	Terrigal-Avoca	10.8 (68) - 7.12 (54)	Cardiff
2013	Newcastle City	18.9 (117) - 14.9 (93)	Terrigal-Avoca
2014	Terrigal-Avoca	17.12 (114) - 9.5 (59)	Killarney Vale
2015	Terrigal-Avoca	14.9 (93) - 10.11 (71)	Newcastle City
2016	Newcastle City	14.13 (97) - 5.6 (36)	Terrigal-Avoca
2017	Terrigal-Avoca	13.11 (89) - 11.14 (80)	Cardiff
2018	Newcastle City	9.11 (65) - 5.13 (43)	Terrigal-Avoca
2019	Terrigal-Avoca	8.9 (57) - 7.5 (47)	Newcastle City
2020	Terrigal-Avoca	10.16 (76) - 7.8 (50)	Newcastle City
2021	No premiership awarded		
2022	Killarney Vale	11.5 (71) - 8.10 (58)	Terrigal-Avoca
2023	Newcastle City	12.10 (82) - 10.13 (73)	Terrigal-Avoca
2024	Newcastle City	10.4 (64) - 2.8 (20)	Cardiff
2025	Terrigal-Avoca	11.13 (79) - 8.3 (51)	Newcastle City
2026	Newcastle City	12.8 (80) - 7.11 (53)	Killarney Vale

== Women's BDAFL/FLHCC Premiers ==
Year	Premiers	Score	Runners Up
2015	Newcastle City	4.5 (29) - 1.1 (7)	Nelson Bay
2016	Nelson Bay	5.2 (32) - 3.11 (29)	Newcastle City
2017	Newcastle City	10.11 (71) - 1.6 (12)	Nelson Bay
2018	Newcastle City	5.10 (40) - 1.1 (7)	Wyong Lakes
2019	Newcastle City	8.6 (54) - 3.0 (18)	Maitland
2020	Newcastle City	6.6 (42) - 3.7 (25)	Killarney Vale
2021	No premiership awarded		
2022	Newcastle City	3.6 (24) - 3.3 (21)	Killarney Vale
2023	Newcastle City	7.6 (48) - 2.5 (17)	Killarney Vale
2024	Killarney Vale	5.1 (31) - 3.8 (26)	Cardiff
2025	Killarney Vale	5.3 (33) - 3.3 (21) (a.e.t.)	Newcastle City
2026	Killarney Vale	5.1 (31) - 4.5 (29)	Newcastle City

== Men's First Grade (Black Diamond Cup) ==
=== 2015 Ladder ===
Black Diamond AFL	Wins	Byes	Losses	Draws	For	Against	%	Pts	Final	Team	G	B	Pts	Team	G	B	Pts
Terrigal Avoca	15	0	1	0	1992	614	324.43%	60	1st Semi	Killarney Vale	16	7	103	Warners Bay	5	9	39
Newcastle City	13	0	3	0	1633	961	169.93%	52	2nd Semi	Newcastle City	9	15	69	Terrigal Avoca	6	8	44
Killarney Vale	8	0	8	0	1143	1202	95.09%	32	Preliminary	Terrigal Avoca	13	21	99	Killarney Vale	7	7	49
Warners Bay	6	0	10	0	881	1516	58.11%	24	Grand	Terrigal Avoca	14	9	93	Newcastle City	10	11	71
Nelson Bay	5	0	11	0	939	1441	65.16%	20									
Cardiff	1	0	15	0	922	1776	51.91%	4									

=== 2016 Ladder ===
Black Diamond AFL	Wins	Byes	Losses	Draws	For	Against	%	Pts	Final	Team	G	B	Pts	Team	G	B	Pts
Newcastle City	16	0	1	0	2165	792	273.36%	64	1st Semi	Nelson Bay	10	17	77	Cardiff	9	10	64
Terrigal Avoca	11	0	6	0	1577	1073	146.97%	44	2nd Semi	Newcastle City	10	17	77	Terrigal Avoca	8	7	55
Nelson Bay	8	0	9	0	1459	1514	96.37%	32	Preliminary	Terrigal Avoca	16	21	117	Nelson Bay	12	10	82
Cardiff	8	0	9	0	1346	1781	75.58%	32	Grand	Newcastle City	14	13	97	Terrigal Avoca	5	6	36
Warners Bay	6	0	11	0	1111	1548	71.77%	24									
Killarney Vale	2	0	15	0	896	1846	48.54%	8									

=== 2017 Ladder ===
Black Diamond AFL	Wins	Byes	Losses	Draws	For	Against	%	Pts	Final	Team	G	B	Pts	Team	G	B	Pts
Terrigal Avoca	14	0	2	0	1436	772	186.01%	56	1st Semi	Newcastle City	5	17	47	Nelson Bay	6	12	48
Cardiff	13	0	3	0	1375	1157	118.84%	52	2nd Semi	Terrigal Avoca	17	8	110	Cardiff	9	10	64
Newcastle City	11	0	5	0	1265	1003	126.12%	44	Preliminary	Cardiff	16	13	109	Nelson Bay	7	6	48
Nelson Bay	5	0	11	0	1161	1370	84.74%	20	Grand	Terrigal Avoca	13	11	89	Cardiff	11	14	80
Warners Bay	3	0	13	0	970	1218	79.64%	12									
Killarney Vale	2	0	14	0	817	1504	54.32%	8									

=== 2018 Ladder ===
Black Diamond AFL	Wins	Byes	Losses	Draws	For	Against	%	Pts	Final	Team	G	B	Pts	Team	G	B	Pts
Terrigal-Avoca	15	2	1	0	2121	438	484.25	60	1st Elimination	Singleton	5	8	38	Warners Bay	7	17	59
Cardiff	14	2	2	0	1792	711	252.04	56	2nd Elimination	Newcastle City	11	7	73	Killarney Vale	4	6	30
Newcastle City	12	2	3	0	1795	528	339.96	48	3rd Elimination	Cardiff	10	15	75	Wyong Lakes	7	3	45
Singleton	10	2	6	0	1102	1094	100.73	40	1st Prelim	Newcastle City	10	10	70	Cardiff	5	11	41
Warners Bay	9	2	6	0	1363	662	205.89	36	2nd Prelim	Terrigal-Avoca	11	14	80	Warners Bay	4	8	32
Killarney Vale	9	2	7	0	1175	1113	105.57	36	Grand	Newcastle City	9	11	65	Terrigal-Avoca	5	13	43
Wyong Lakes	6	2	10	0	1157	1358	85.20	24									
Gosford	6	2	10	0	888	1491	59.56	24									
Nelson Bay	3	2	13	0	776	1740	44.60	12									
Maitland	3	2	13	0	668	1780	37.53	12									
Lake Macquarie	0	2	16	0	412	2332	17.67	0									

=== 2019 Ladder ===
Black Diamond Cup	Wins	Byes	Losses	Draws	For	Against	%	Pts	Final	Team	G	B	Pts	Team	G	B	Pts
Terrigal-Avoca	17	0	1	0	2171	544	399.08	68	1st Elimination	Killarney Vale	7	8	50	Singleton	10	6	66
Newcastle City	15	0	3	0	1903	712	267.28	60	2nd Elimination	Cardiff	12	16	88	Warners Bay	4	8	32
Cardiff	14	0	4	0	1719	838	205.13	56	1st Semi	Terrigal-Avoca	6	6	42	Singleton	4	2	26
Killarney Vale	11	0	7	0	1373	1106	124.14	44	2nd Semi	Newcastle City	8	10	58	Cardiff	5	10	40
Singleton	10	0	8	0	1144	1465	78.09	40	Grand	Terrigal-Avoca	8	9	57	Newcastle City	7	5	47
Warners Bay	8	0	10	0	1107	1305	84.83	32									
Maitland	5	0	13	0	837	1857	45.07	20									
Nelson Bay	4	0	14	0	935	1861	50.24	16									
Wyong Lakes	3	0	15	0	1049	1662	63.12	12									
Gosford	3	0	15	0	1063	1951	54.48	12									

=== 2020 Ladder ===
Black Diamond Cup	Wins	Byes	Losses	Draws	For	Against	%	Pts	Final	Team	G	B	Pts	Team	G	B	Pts
Terrigal-Avoca	12	0	0	0	1559	430	362.56	48	1st Semi Final	Newcastle City	8	12	60	Singleton	8	6	54
Newcastle City	10	0	2	0	1128	694	162.54	40	2nd Semi Final	Terrigal-Avoca	15	13	103	Killarney Vale	4	5	29
Singleton	9	0	3	0	839	806	104.09	36	Grand	Terrigal-Avoca	10	16	76	Newcastle City	7	8	50
Killarney Vale	8	0	4	0	845	674	125.37	32									
Nelson Bay	6	0	6	0	993	977	101.64	24									
Cardiff	5	0	6	1	982	844	116.35	22									
Warners Bay	4	0	7	1	808	918	88.02	18									
Gosford	3	0	9	0	767	1153	66.52	12									
Maitland	1	0	11	0	484	1193	40.57	4									
Wyong Lakes	1	0	11	0	486	1202	40.43	4									

=== 2021 Ladder (After Round 10) ===
Black Diamond Cup	Wins	Byes	Losses	Draws	For	Against	%	Pct Won
Terrigal-Avoca	8	1	0	0	1117	203	550.25	100.00
Newcastle City	7	1	1	0	860	313	274.76	
Killarney Vale	5	1	3	0	564	382	147.64	62.50
Warners Bay	5	1	3	0	556	536	103.73	62.50
Singleton	4	1	5	0	454	683	66.47	44.44
Gosford	3	1	5	0	487	542	89.85	37.50
Maitland	3	1	6	0	451	831	54.27	33.33
Cardiff	2	1	7	0	581	685	84.82	22.22
Nelson Bay	0	2	7	0	148	1043	14.19	0.00

=== 2022 Ladder ===
Black Diamond Cup	Wins	Byes	Losses	Draws	For	Against	%	Pts	Final	Team	G	B	Pts	Team	G	B	Pts
Killarney Vale	14	2	1	0	1405	454	309.47%	56	Elimination	Cardiff	9	8	62	Newcastle City	4	4	28
Terrigal-Avoca	12	2	3	0	1477	648	227.93%	48	Qualifying	Killarney Vale	9	5	59	Terrigal-Avoca	5	4	34
Cardiff	9	3	6	0	1184	946	125.16%	36	Preliminary	Terrigal-Avoca	10	12	72	Cardiff	3	7	25
Newcastle City	8	2	6	0	1170	744	157.26%	32	Grand	Killarney Vale	11	5	71	Terrigal-Avoca	8	10	58
Warners Bay	5	3	9	0	925	996	92.87%	20									
Maitland	2	3	13	0	625	1553	40.24%	8									
Singleton	1	3	12	0	327	1772	18.45%	4									

=== 2023 Ladder ===
Black Diamond Cup	Wins	Losses	Draws	Byes	Forfeits
Terrigal Avoca	13	3	0	2	0
Cardiff	13	3	0	2	0
Newcastle City	12	4	0	2	0
Killarney Vale	12	4	0	2	0
Maitland	8	8	0	2	0
Warners Bay	7	8	1	2	0
TEBB	3	12	1	2	0
Singleton	2	6	0	2	8
Nelson Bay	1	13	0	1	2

=== 2024 Ladder ===
Black Diamond Cup	Wins	Losses	Draws	Byes	Forfeits
Cardiff	12	3	0	2	0
Newcastle City	11	4	0	2	0
Terrigal Avoca	10	4	0	2	0
Warners Bay	10	4	0	3	0
Maitland	3	11	0	3	0
Killarney Vale	2	12	0	2	0
TEBB	2	12	0	3	0

=== 2025 Ladder ===
Black Diamond Cup	Match Ratio*	Wins	Losses	Draws	Byes	Forfeits
Warners Bay	84.61	11	2	0	1	0
Newcastle City	81.25	13	3	0	0	0
Terrigal Avoca	73.33	11	4	0	1	0
Nelson Bay	54.54	6	5	0	1	0
Killarney Vale	46.66	7	8	0	1	0
Cardiff	37.50	6	10	1	0	0
Maitland	18.75	3	13	1	1	0
TEBB	12.50	2	14	0	0	0

Ladder was decided by Match Ratio. This is because not all teams played even amounts of games in the season. The match ratio is calculated by dividing a teams total pints in the season by the number of points they could have earned from the amount of matches they played.

== Men's Second Grade (Black Diamond Plate) ==
=== 2015 Ladder ===
Black Diamond AFL Div 1	Wins	Byes	Losses	Draws	For	Against	%	Pts	Final	Team	G	B	M/R	Team	G	B	Pts
Terrigal Avoca	12	2	2	1	1394	567	245.86%	80	1st Semi	Maitland	12	11	83	Wyong Lakes	11	11	77
Newcastle City	12	2	2	1	1351	579	233.33%	80	2nd Semi	Newcastle Bay	9	8	62	Terrigal Avoca	2	10	22
Wyong Lakes	10	2	4	1	1395	801	174.16%	67	Preliminary	Terrigal Avoca	15	11	101	Maitland	9	5	59
Maitland	10	2	5	0	1303	751	173.50%	67	Grand	Newcastle Bay	11	6	72	Terrigal Avoca	7	8	50
Warners Bay	7	2	8	0	681	958	71.09%	47									
Singleton	5	3	9	0	817	1283	63.68%	35									
Cardiff	5	2	10	0	623	1250	49.84%	33									
Killarney Vale	3	3	10	1	635	1252	50.72%	21									
Lake Macquarie	0	3	14	0	505	1263	39.98%	0									

=== 2016 Ladder ===
Black Diamond AFL Div 1	Wins	Byes	Losses	Draws	For	Against	%	Pts	Final	Team	G	B	Pts	Team	G	B	Pts
Singleton	15	0	2	0	1875	524	357.82%	60	1st Semi	Newcastle Bay	16	17	113	Gosford	1	7	13
Maitland	15	0	2	0	1636	730	224.11%	60	2nd Semi	Singleton	13	15	93	Maitland	11	7	73
Newcastle City	14	0	3	0	1668	620	269.03%	56	Preliminary	Maitland	13	6	84	Newcastle Bay	6	16	52
Gosford	13	0	4	0	1743	851	204.82%	52	Grand	Singleton	6	7	43	Maitland	2	4	16
Terrigal Avoca	8	0	9	0	1362	960	141.88%	32									
Wyong Lakes	8	0	9	0	1373	1044	131.51%	32									
Warners Bay	5	0	11	1	838	1454	57.63%	22									
Cardiff	3	0	14	0	629	1758	35.78%	12									
Lake Macquarie	2	0	14	1	525	1637	32.07%	10									
Killarney Vale	1	0	16	0	341	2412	14.14%	4									

=== 2017 Ladder ===
Black Diamond AFL Div 1	Wins	Byes	Losses	Draws	For	Against	%	Pts	Final	Team	G	B	M/R	Team	G	B	Pts
Wyong Lakes	14	2	2	0	1663	695	239.28	56	1st Semi	Singleton	12	13	85	City	1	3	9
Maitland	14	2	2	0	1468	661	222.09	56	2nd Semi	Wyong	5	10	40	Maitland	9	12	66
Singleton	13	2	3	0	1406	654	214.98	52	Preliminary	Wyong	7	7	49	Singleton	11	11	77
Newcastle City	9	2	7	0	1185	829	142.94	36	Grand	Maitland	14	5	89	Singleton	9	10	64
Gosford	8	2	8	0	1260	1138	110.72	32									
Terrigal-Avoca	8	2	8	0	1006	1069	94.11	32									
Lake Macquarie	3	2	13	0	738	1395	52.90	12									
Muswellbrook	2	2	14	0	748	1461	51.20	8									
The Entrance-Bateau Bay	1	2	15	0	334	1906	17.52	4									

=== 2018 Ladder ===
Black Diamond AFL Div 1	Wins	Byes	Losses	Draws	For	Against	%	Pts	Final	Team	G	B	Pts	Team	G	B	Pts
Terrigal-Avoca	16	0	0	0	2170	328	661.59	64	1st Elimination	Muswellbrook	9	10	64	TEBB	6	7	43
Newcastle City	15	0	1	0	2059	323	637.46	60	2nd Elimination	Newcastle City	14	21	105	Warners Bay	0	0	0
Cardiff	13	0	3	0	1935	545	355.05	52	3rd Elimination	Cardiff	5	7	37	Killarney Vale	11	7	73
Muswellbrook	12	0	3	1	1735	499	347.70	50	1st Prelim	Newcastle City	13	6	84	Muswellbrook	7	7	49
The Entrance-Bateau Bay	11	0	4	1	1545	552	279.89	46	2nd Prelim	Terrigal-Avoca	11	11	77	Killarney Vale	0	7	7
Killarney Vale	9	0	7	0	1226	946	129.60	36	Grand	Terrigal-Avoca	6	9	45	Newcastle City	4	7	31
Warners Bay	6	0	10	0	960	1202	79.87	24									
Maitland	6	0	10	0	685	1545	44.34	24									
Gosford	5	0	11	0	775	1461	53.05	20									
Wyong Lakes	5	0	11	0	768	1487	51.65	20									
Lake Macquarie	5	0	11	0	604	1762	34.28	20									
Singleton	4	0	12	0	560	1658	33.78	16									
Wallsend-West Newcastle	2	0	14	0	546	1756	31.09	8									
Nelson Bay	2	0	14	0	429	1933	22.19	8									

=== 2019 Ladder ===
Black Diamond Plate	Wins	Byes	Losses	Draws	For	Against	%	Pts	Final	Team	G	B	Pts	Team	G	B	Pts
Terrigal-Avoca	16	2	0	0	1536	349	440.11	100	1st Elimination	Warners Bay	6	13	49	Killarney Vale	6	7	43
Newcastle City	14	2	2	0	1691	408	414.46	87.50	2nd Elimination	TEBB	12	7	79	Muswellbrook	6	14	50
The Entrance Bateau Bay	11	2	5	0	1472	690	213.33	68.75	1st Semi	Terrigal-Avoca	8	12	60	Warners Bay	3	7	25
Warners Bay	11	2	5	0	1323	627	211.00	68.75	2nd Semi	Newcastle City	3	6	24	TEBB	6	9	45
Killarney Vale	11	2	5	0	1228	725	169.38	68.75	Grand	Terrigal-Avoca	20	13	133	TEBB	1	5	11
Muswellbrook	10	2	5	0	1140	609	187.19	66.67									
Cardiff	8	2	8	0	1074	819	131.14	50.00									
Lake Macquarie	7	2	9	0	1091	798	136.72	43.75									
Wallsend-West Newcastle	5	2	10	0	716	1438	49.79	33.33									
Maitland	5	2	11	0	752	1170	64.27	31.25									
Wyong Lakes	2	2	14	0	536	1714	31.27	12.50									
Singleton	2	2	14	0	343	1864	18.40	12.50									
Gosford	1	2	15	0	218	1909	11.42	6.25									

=== 2020 Ladder ===
Due to coronavirus concerns in the Upper Hunter, Muswellbrook withdrew their men and women's teams after Round 5 for the remainder of the season.

Black Diamond Plate	Wins	Byes	Losses	Draws	For	Against	%	Pts	Final	Team	G	B	Pts	Team	G	B	Pts
Newcastle City	9	1	1	0	920	312	294.87	90	1st Semi Final	Terrigal-Avoca	23	10	148	TEBB	7	3	45
Terrigal-Avoca	8	2	2	0	938	320	293.12	80	2nd Semi Final	Newcastle City	29	11	185	Wallsend-West Newcastle	2	2	14
The Entrance Bateau Bay	4	2	5	0	630	615	102.44	44.44	Grand Final	Newcastle City	7	5	47	Terrigal-Avoca	11	10	76
Wallsend-West Newcastle	3	1	8	0	413	804	51.37	27.27									
Lake Macquarie	3	1	8	0	375	945	39.68	27.27									
Muswellbrook	1	0	4	0	170	450	37.78	20.00									

=== 2021 Ladder (After Round 10) ===
Black Diamond Plate	Wins	Losses	Draws	Byes	For	Against	%	Pct Won
Terrigal Avoca	8	0	0	1	753	306	246.08%	100.00
Newcastle City	6	2	0	1	807	243	332.10%	75.00
Wyong Lakes	6	2	1	1	749	423	177.07%	72.22
The Entrance Bateau Bay	5	4	0	1	682	440	155.00%	55.56
Cardiff	4	5	0	1	576	601	95.84%	44.44
Wallsend-West Newcastle	2	5	1	1	413	665	62.11%	31.25
Lake Macquarie	2	6	0	2	392	733	53.48%	25.00
Gosford	2	6	0	1	355	922	38.50%	25.00
Muswellbrook	2	7	0	1	435	829	52.47%	22.22

== Men's Third Grade (Black Diamond Shield) ==
=== 2015 Ladder ===
Black Diamond AFL Div 2	Wins	Byes	Losses	Draws	For	Against	%	Pts	Final	Team	G	B	Pts	Team	G	B	Pts
Newcastle City	14	1	2	0	1429	526	271.67%	60	1st Semi	Lake Macquarie	15	11	101	Terrigal Avoca	6	6	42
The Entrance Bateau Bay	14	1	2	0	1334	656	203.35%	60	2nd Semi	The Entrance Bateau Bay	7	10	52	Newcastle City	7	4	46
Terrigal Avoca	13	1	3	0	1531	544	281.43%	56	Preliminary	Newcastle City	15	13	103	Lake Macquarie	3	4	22
Lake Macquarie	10	1	6	0	1202	777	154.70%	44	Grand	Newcastle City	16	5	101	The Entrance Bateau Bay	9	11	65
Singleton	10	1	6	0	1079	1045	103.25%	44									
Muswellbrook	8	1	8	0	1229	895	137.32%	36									
Warners Bay	7	1	9	0	841	880	95.57%	32									
Cardiff	6	1	10	0	757	1186	63.83%	28									
Nelson Bay	5	1	11	0	862	1129	76.35%	24									
Maitland	5	1	11	0	734	999	73.47%	24									
Wyong Lakes	3	1	13	0	607	1826	33.24%	16									
Killarney Vale	1	1	15	0	502	1644	30.54%	8									

=== 2016 Ladder ===
Black Diamond AFL Div 2	Wins	Byes	Losses	Draws	For	Against	%	Pts	Final	Team	G	B	Pts	Team	G	B	Pts
Muswellbrook	14	0	0	0	1866	380	491.05%	56	Elimination	Warners Bay	5	5	35	Terrigal Avoca	3	12	30
The Entrance Bateau Bay	12	0	2	0	1286	443	290.29%	48	Qualifying	The Entrance Bateau Bay	9	9	63	Newcastle City	7	4	46
Newcastle City	10	0	4	0	1394	446	312.56%	40	1st Semi	Warners Bay	9	9	63	Newcastle City	6	9	45
Terrigal Avoca	10	0	4	0	1181	636	185.69%	40	2nd Semi	Muswellbrook	8	12	60	The Entrance Bateau Bay	9	5	59
Warners Bay	7	0	7	0	673	1085	62.03%	28	Preliminary	The Entrance Bateau Bay	22	11	143	Warners Bay	3	6	24
Gosford	6	0	8	0	823	1038	79.29%	24	Grand	The Entrance Bateau Bay	7	10	52	Muswellbrook	5	6	36
Maitland	6	0	8	0	650	1213	53.59%	24									
Nelson Bay	4	0	10	0	870	1089	79.89%	16									
Singleton	3	0	11	0	663	1536	43.16%	12									
Killarney Vale	3	0	11	0	488	1341	36.39%	12									
Wyong Lakes	2	0	12	0	550	1237	44.46%	8									

=== 2017 Ladder ===
Black Diamond AFL	Wins	Byes	Losses	Draws	For	Against	%	Pts	Final	Team	G	B	Pts	Team	G	B	Pts
Lake Macquarie	13	2	2	0	1850	544	340.07	52	Qualifying	Warners Bay	6	8	44	Killarney Vale	11	9	75
Killarney Vale	13	1	3	0	1482	614	241.37	52	Elimination	Terrigal-Avoca	15	11	101	Nelson Bay	2	1	13
Warners Bay	12	2	3	0	1341	639	209.86	48	1st Semi	Warners Bay	14	8	92	Terrigal-Avoca	9	8	62
Terrigal-Avoca	11	2	4	0	1393	757	184.02	44	2nd Semi	Cardiff	6	3	39	Killarney Vale	12	10	82
Nelson Bay	7	2	8	0	997	865	115.26	28	Preliminary	Cardiff	8	7	55	Warners Bay	4	15	39
Cardiff	7	2	8	0	640	1274	50.24	28	Grand	Killarney Vale	6	10	46	Lake Macquarie	10	10	70
Gosford	6	2	9	0	773	1319	58.61	24									
Maitland	5	2	10	0	581	1073	54.15	20									
Newcastle City	4	2	11	0	723	1063	68.02	16									
Singleton	3	2	12	0	531	1349	39.36	12									
Wyong Lakes	2	2	13	0	608	1422	42.76	8									

After the 2017 season, the league was changed from having three senior men's grade to two, consisting of the Black Diamond Cup (Premier Division) and Black Diamond Plate (Reserves), onward from the 2018 season. However, a third men's competition was reintroduced in 2020, the Black Diamond Shield, which consists of the reserves sides of every club except Terrigal-Avoca, Newcastle City, Nelson Bay, Muswellbrook, The Entrance Bateau Bay, Lake Macquarie, Wallsend-West Newcastle and Port Stephens, who currently only field a senior women's team.

=== 2020 Ladder ===
Black Diamond Shield	Wins	Byes	Losses	Draws	For	Against	%	Pts	Final	Team	G	B	Pts	Team	G	B	Pts
Cardiff	11	1	0	0	1206	248	486.29	100.00	1st Semi Final	Cardiff	12	12	84	Gosford	7	5	47
Killarney Vale	8	1	3	0	813	463	175.59	72.73	2nd Semi Final	Killarney Vale	12	9	81	Warners Bay	6	4	40
Warners Bay	7	2	3	0	736	400	184.00	70.00	Grand	Cardiff	11	14	80	Killarney Vale	9	7	61
Gosford	4	2	6	0	751	631	119.02	40.00									
Singleton	3	2	7	0	348	838	41.53	30.00									
Wyong Lakes	2	2	8	0	298	962	30.98	20.00									
Maitland	1	2	9	0	332	942	35.24	10.00									

=== 2021 Ladder (After Round 10) ===
Singleton also had a Reserve Grade side competing in the 2021 Black Diamond Shield, but eventually pulled out of the competition after Round 3 after forfeiting their first two games for the year.

Black Diamond Shield	Wins	Byes	Losses	Draws	For	Against	%	Pts
Warners Bay	8	1	1	0	917	246	372.76%	88.89
Newcastle City Blues	6	2	2	0	788	225	350.22%	75.00
Killarney Vale	5	2	3	0	576	355	162.25%	62.50
Gosford	2	2	6	0	329	776	42.40%	25.00
Maitland	0	3	7	0	155	923	16.79%	0.00

== Black Diamond Women's football competition ==
=== 2015 Ladder ===
An open age women's competition commenced in 2015. Initially starting with 6 teams the competition expanded to 10 the following year. The 2017 season saw 2 new teams and the 2018 season saw 16 teams.

Black Diamond AFL	Wins	Byes	Losses	Draws	For	Against	%	Pts	Final	Team	G	B	Pts	Team	G	B	Pts
Nelson Bay	13	0	1	0	761	95	801.05%	52	1st Semi	Warners Bay	11	9	75	Lake Macquarie	1	1	7
Newcastle City	12	0	2	0	703	125	562.40%	48	2nd Semi	Nelson Bay	7	7	49	Newcastle City	4	1	25
Warners Bay	8	0	6	0	480	311	154.34%	32	Preliminary	Newcastle City	5	7	37	Warners Bay	4	6	30
Lake Macquarie	5	0	9	0	352	660	53.33%	20	Grand	Newcastle City	4	5	29	Nelson Bay	1	1	7
Wyong Lakes	3	0	11	0	277	502	55.18%	12									
Maitland	1	0	13	0	148	1028	14.40%	4									

=== 2016 Ladder ===
Black Diamond AFL	Wins	Byes	Losses	Draws	For	Against	%	Pts	Final	Team	G	B	Pts	Team	G	B	Pts
Nelson Bay	15	0	0	0	968	141	686.52%	60	1st Semi	Newcastle City	4	10	34	Cardiff	1	6	12
Gosford	12	0	3	0	1079	202	534.16%	48	2nd Semi	Nelson Bay	7	12	54	Gosford	2	0	12
Newcastle City	12	0	3	0	941	197	477.66%	48	Preliminary	Terrigal Avoca	16	11	107	Gosford	1	1	7
Cardiff	11	0	4	0	820	321	255.45%	44	Grand	Nelson Bay	5	2	32	Newcastle City	3	11	29
Wyong Lakes	10	0	5	0	656	465	141.08%	40									
Warners Bay	5	0	10	0	569	467	121.84%	20									
Maitland	5	0	10	0	608	637	95.45%	20									
Killarney Vale	3	0	12	0	352	798	44.11%	12									
Lake Macquarie	2	0	13	0	318	969	32.82%	8									
Singleton	0	0	15	0	13	2127	0.61%	0									

=== 2017 Ladder ===
Black Diamond AFL	Wins	Byes	Losses	Draws	For	Against	%	Pts	Final	Team	G	B	Pts	Team	G	B	Pts
Newcastle City	16	0	0	0	2167	116	1868.10	64	1st Semi	Maitland	7	5	47	Wyong Lakes	4	1	25
Nelson Bay	14	0	2	0	1211	307	394.46	56	2nd Semi	Gosford	6	7	43	Killarney Vale	2	2	14
Gosford	12	0	4	0	1177	405	290.62	48	Prelim 1	Newcastle City	23	13	151	Maitland	0	1	1
Maitland	12	0	4	0	1069	577	185.27	48	Prelim 2	Nelson Bay	9	7	61	Gosford	0	5	5
Wyong Lakes	9	0	7	0	728	455	160.00	36	Grand	Newcastle City	10	11	71	Nelson Bay	1	6	12
Killarney Vale	9	0	7	0	801	544	147.24	36									
Warners Bay	9	0	7	0	642	613	104.73	36									
Singleton	6	0	10	0	369	798	46.24	24									
Lake Macquarie	4	0	12	0	586	890	65.84	16									
Cardiff	3	0	13	0	370	1149	32.20	12									
Newcastle Novas	2	0	14	0	272	1589	17.12	8									
Muswellbrook	0	0	16	0	16	1965	0.81	0									

=== 2018 Ladder ===
Black Diamond AFL	P	W	L	D	F	A	%	Pts	Final	Team	G	B	Pts	Team	G	B	Pts
Nelson Bay	16	14	2	0	1538	175	878.86	56	1st Semi	Killarney Vale	5	4	34	Singleton	1	1	7
Newcastle City Stars	16	14	2	0	1447	298	485.57	56	2nd Semi	Newcastle City Stars	5	3	32	Maitland	4	4	28
Killarney Vale	16	13	3	0	1082	349	310.03	52	Elimination	Wyong Lakes	6	5	41	Newcastle City Novas	0	1	1
Wyong Lakes	16	12	4	0	1174	237	495.36	48	1st Prelim	Nelson Bay	0	1	1	Wyong Lakes	3	1	19
Newcastle City Novas	16	12	4	0	1284	328	391.46	48	2nd Prelim	Newcastle City Stars	8	6	54	Killarney Vale	4	1	25
Singleton	16	10	6	0	807	359	224.79	40	Grand	Newcastle City Stars	5	10	40	Wyong Lakes	1	1	7
Maitland	16	10	6	0	1205	572	210.66	40									
Gosford	16	9	7	0	1192	684	174.27	36									
Warners Bay	16	9	7	0	988	605	163.31	36									
Cardiff	16	8	8	0	887	644	137.73	32									
Terrigal-Avoca	16	6	10	0	762	830	91.81	24									
Lake Macquarie	16	4	12	0	580	1164	49.83	16									
Muswellbrook	16	3	13	0	314	1383	22.70	12									
Port Stephens	16	2	14	0	209	2027	10.31	8									
The Entrance-Bateau Bay	16	1	15	0	91	2186	4.16	4									
Wallsend-West Newcastle	16	1	15	0	59	1819	3.24	4									

=== 2019 Ladder ===
Black Diamond AFL	Wins	Byes	Losses	Draws	For	Against	%	Pts	Final	Team	G	B	Pts	Team	G	B	Pts
Killarney Vale	15	2	1	0	1796	148	1213.51	93.75	1st Elimination	Newcastle City	9	5	59	Terrigal-Avoca	0	1	1
Maitland	13	2	3	0	1344	182	738.46	81.25	2nd Elimination	Wyong Lakes	3	2	20	Cardiff	0	1	1
Wyong Lakes	13	2	3	0	1355	238	569.33	81.25	1st Semi	Killarney Vale	3	9	27	Newcastle City	5	4	34
Newcastle City	13	2	3	0	1141	239	477.41	81.25	2nd Semi	Maitland	2	9	21	Wyong Lakes	2	6	18
Terrigal-Avoca	12	2	4	0	1237	307	402.93	75.00	Grand	Newcastle City	8	6	54	Maitland	3	0	18
Cardiff	11	2	5	0	1130	390	289.74	68.75									
Lake Macquarie	9	2	7	0	766	859	89.17	56.25									
Warners Bay	8	2	8	0	1039	499	208.22	50.00									
Nelson Bay	6	2	10	0	488	998	48.90	37.50									
Singleton	6	2	10	0	538	1144	47.03	37.50									
Wallsend-West Newcastle	5	2	10	0	531	1007	52.73	33.33									
Port Stephens	3	2	13	0	268	1459	18.37	18.75									
Gosford	2	2	14	0	195	1906	10.23	12.50									
The Entrance Bateau Bay	2	2	14	0	130	1333	9.75	12.50									
Muswellbrook	1	2	14	0	168	1417	11.86	6.67									

The 2020 season saw the introduction of a second women's competition. Known as the Black Diamond Plate Women's, it would act as the Second Division of the Black Diamond Cup Women's, which became the First Division women's competition.

=== 2020 Ladders ===
==== Women's First Grade (Black Diamond Cup Women) ====
Black Diamond Cup Women's	Wins	Byes	Losses	Draws	For	Against	%	Pts	Final	Team	G	B	Pts	Team	G	B	Pts
Killarney Vale	12	0	0	0	1329	139	956.12	48	1st Semi Final	Newcastle City	14	8	92	Cardiff	1	3	9
Newcastle City	11	0	1	0	1283	157	817.20	44	2nd Semi Final	Killarney Vale	7	8	50	Wyong Lakes	1	0	6
Cardiff	9	0	3	0	707	337	209.79	36	Grand	Killarney Vale	3	7	25	Newcastle City	6	6	42
Wyong Lakes	5	0	7	0	511	461	110.85	20									
Terrigal-Avoca	5	0	7	0	447	501	89.22	20									
Warners Bay	4	0	8	0	379	651	58.22	16									
Maitland	2	0	10	0	174	1262	13.79	9									
Nelson Bay/Port Stephens	12	0	12	0	56	1378	4.06	0									

==== Women's Second Grade (Black Diamond Plate Women) ====
Due to coronavirus concerns in the Upper Hunter, Muswellbrook withdrew their women's and men's team after Round 5.

Black Diamond Plate Women's	Wins	Byes	Losses	Draws	For	Against	%	Pts	Final	Team	G	B	Pts	Team	G	B	Pts
Lake Macquarie	11	0	1	0	825	255	323.53%	91.67	1st Semi	Lake Macquarie	9	9	63	The Entrance Bateau Bay	1	6	12
Singleton	9	0	3	0	638	206	309.71%	75.00	2nd Semi	Singleton	6	6	42	Wallsend-West Newcastle	2	3	15
Wallsend-West Newcastle	6	0	6	0	404	475	85.05%	350.00	Grand	Lake Macquarie	0	0	0	Singleton	0	0	0
The Entrance Bateau Bay	5	1	6	0	367	494	74.29%	45.45									
Newcastle City	4	2	6	0	391	377	103.71%	40.00									
Gosford	1	0	11	0	212	872	24.31%	8.33									
Muswellbrook	0	2	3	0	35	193	18.13%	0.00									

=== 2021 Ladders ===
==== Women's First Grade (Black Diamond Cup Women, after Round 9) ====
Black Diamond Cup Women's	Wins	Byes	Losses	Draws	For	Against	%	Pts
Cardiff	9	0	0	0	743	114	651.75%	100.00
Newcastle City	8	0	1	0	665	92	722.83%	88.89
Terrigal-Avoca	4	1	4	0	342	305	112.13%	50.00
Wyong Lakes	4	1	4	0	331	311	106.43%	50.00
Lake Macquarie	4	1	4	0	252	462	54.55%	50.00
Killarney Vale	3	1	5	0	298	274	108.76%	37.50
Maitland	1	1	7	0	109	667	16.10%	12.50
Warners Bay	0	1	8	0	88	593	14.84%	0.00

==== Women's Second Grade (Black Diamond Plate Women, after Round 10) ====
Black Diamond Plate Women's	Wins	Byes	Losses	Draws	For	Against	%	Pts
Cardiff	8	1	1	0	456	126	361.90%	88.89
Singleton	7	1	1	0	303	72	420.83%	87.50
Newcastle City	6	1	2	0	264	128	206.25%	75.00
Wallsend-West Newcastle	4	1	4	0	242	249	97.19%	50.00
Terrigal-Avoca	3	1	5	0	222	158	140.51%	37.50
Gosford	3	1	5	0	187	356	52.53%	37.50
Muswellbrook	3	1	6	0	166	185	89.73%	33.33
The Entrance Bateau Bay	2	1	6	0	103	338	30.47%	25.00
Nelson Bay/Port Stephens	1	1	7	0	79	410	19.27%	12.50

== Newcastle Central Coast Umpires Association ==
The Newcastle Central Coast Umpires Association provides umpires to the following competitions:

• AFL Hunter Coast (Senior Football League on the Central Coast, Newcastle and Hunter regions);

• AFL Hunter Coast:

- Central Coast Juniors (Junior Football League on the Central Coast)
- Hunter Juniors (Junior Football League in the Newcastle and Hunter regions)

The NCCUA not only provides umpires to these competitions but provides training and support to these umpires.

The NCCUA trains at the following locations, starting at 5:30 pm:

Tuesdays – Lisarow Sports Ground, Lisarow

Wednesdays – Tulkaba Park, Teralba

The Newcastle Central Coast Umpires Association is led by president Jake Lowe, treasurer Ashley Borg, secretary, Tomas Steward and a committee of several umpires.

The current umpire's coach is Christine Burrows. She works across Junior and Senior Football umpiring pathways.

There are also several people who assist both Christine in various coaching and mentoring roles.

== See also ==
- AFL NSW/ACT
- Australian rules football in New South Wales
- Newcastle Australian Football League
- Newcastle Rugby League
- Newcastle & Hunter Rugby League
- Central Coast Division Rugby League
- Group 3 Rugby League
- Group 21 Rugby League
