= Killarney Vale Australian Football Club =

Killarney Vale

Names
- Full name: Killarney Vale Bombers Australian Football Club
- Nickname: Bombers
- Former nickname: Bunyips
- Motto: Flectamus Non Frangemur
- Club song: 'When the Bombers come marching through"

2022 season
- After finals: Men's Cup - 1st Men's Plate - DNQ; Women's Cup - 2nd Women's Plate - DNQ
- Home-and-away season: Men's Cup - 1st Men's Plate - 8th Women's Cup - 4th Women's Plate - 8th
- Leading goalkicker: Tim Oosterhoff
- Best and fairest: Josh Mifsud

Club details
- Founded: 1978 (40 years ago)
- Colours
- Competition: Black Diamond Australian Football League
- President: Paul Forster
- Coach: Corey Shackleton
- Captain: Brad Edwards
- Premierships: 8 (1981, 1982, 1986, 1987, 1997, 1998 - CCAFL), (2007, 2022 - BDAFL)
- Ground: Adelaide Street Oval

Uniforms
Home	Away

Other information
- Official website: ccbombers.com

The Killarney Vale Australian Football Club, nicknamed the Bombers, is an Australian rules football club that competes in the AFL Hunter Central Coast competition. The club is based in the Central Coast suburb of Killarney Vale and plays its home games at Adelaide Street Oval, Tumbi Umbi.

== History ==
The club was founded in 1978 with a meeting in the Tumbi Umbi Preschool and played in the Central Coast Australian Football League. They were known as the 'Bunyips' and wore a red, gold and black striped jumper until 1981 when they adopted the 'Bombers' nickname and changed their guernsey to the current red sash. The club won six Premierships in the former Central Coast Australian Football League before the CCAFL amalgamated with the Newcastle Australian Football League to form the Black Diamond Australian Football League after the 1999 season. The club has produced one Australian Football League player, Daniel Lloyd (Greater Western Sydney) who formerly held a scholarship with the Western Bulldogs.

=== Premierships ===
Since the club's inception into the former Central Coast Australian Football League in 1978, the Bombers have won six Premierships from 1981 to 1998. The club has also won two Black Diamond Australian Football League/AFL Hunter Central Coast First Grade premierships, in 2007 and 2022, and were runners up in 1980, 1983, 1985, 1990, 1992, 1999, 2005 and 2014. The Reserves grade side has won four premierships in 1979, 1989, 1993 & 1995.

== Other information ==
This was the Bombers' former logo that was used until 2021

The Killarney Vale Bombers Australian Football Club guernsey is the same as the Essendon Football Club in the Australian Football League.

The Killarney Vale Bombers club song is always sung after a win by all junior and senior grades and is sung to the tune of 'When Johnny Comes Marching Home.'

Killarney Vale currently fields teams in Black Diamond Cup (1st Grade), Black Diamond Plate (Reserve Grade) and fielded a Women's team in 2016 that competes in the Black Diamond Cup Women's competition. The club fielded a second team in the Black Diamond Plate Women's second division for the first time in the club's history in 2022.

The Bombers also field junior teams in Auskick, U9s, U11s, U12s, U14s, U15s and U17s, as well as junior female football in Youth Girls U12s, U14s and U17s.

== A-Grade Premierships ==
- 1981 Central Coast Australian Football League
- 1982 Central Coast Australian Football League
- 1986 Central Coast Australian Football League
- 1987 Central Coast Australian Football League
- 1997 Central Coast Australian Football League
- 1998 Central Coast Australian Football League
- 2007 Black Diamond Australian Football League
- 2022 AFL Hunter Central Coast

== Notable players ==
- Daniel Lloyd
