= Newcastle Australian Football League =

The Newcastle Australian Football League was an Australian rules football competition in the Hunter region around the city of Newcastle, New South Wales, Australia.

The first clubs (Northumberland, Lambton, Newcastle City, Singleton and Wallsend & Plattsburg) began playing against each other in 1883. Originally known as the Northern District Football Association, the first premiers, Newcastle City, were declared in 1886. However, the competition proper began in 1888 with teams contesting for the Black Diamond Cup, now Australia's oldest sporting trophy, and was contested in the Black Diamond Australian Football League and continues to be contested in the AFL Hunter Central Coast competition.

In 1894, popularity of Australian rules waned. In 1948, after World War II, a 4 team competition was reborn - the first properly constituted competition in the region. The competing clubs were Waratah, Mayfield, Newcastle City and Broadmeadow.

After the 1999 season, the NAFL merged with the Central Coast AFL to form the Black Diamond Australian Football League.

== History ==
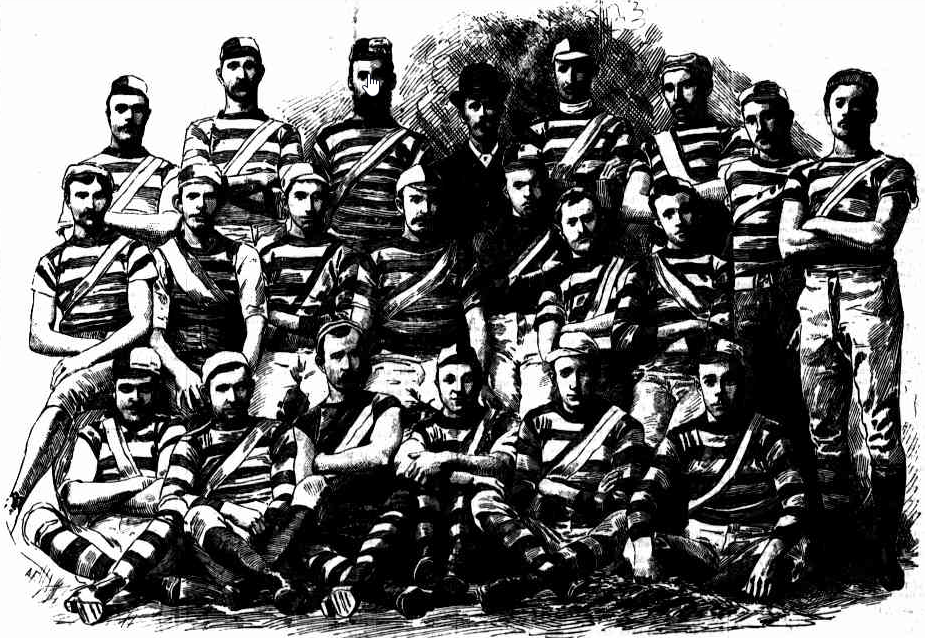
Northumberland Football Club district premiers in 1887, founded in 1881 it was the first club to adopt the code in the Northern District

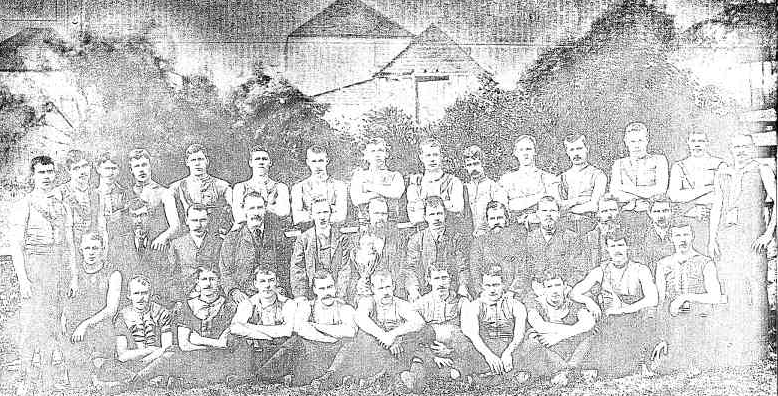
Wallsend Football Club premiers in 1889

=== 1890s ===
The history of Australian rules football in the Hunter Region dates back to 1881, when a club named Northumberland was founded. Rugby union was the only other football code played in the region at that same era, which had been introduced in 1876. During the 1880s over 14,000 people were enticed to the Newcastle district due to the coal mining industry that was rapidly expanding. Three brothers, George, Jim, and John Duguid introduced the sport in 1883 and had previously played football on the goldfields of Ballarat. That same year was when the game was being played formally with the first clubs being formed. The foundation clubs were Newcastle City, Northumberland (Maitland), Singleton, Lambton, Wallsend & Plattsburg. Games in 1883 were played in the form of scratch matches and were hastily organised by the five clubs, each of these games seeing a large crowd attendance.

The same year, 1883, saw the South Melbourne Football Club visit Maitland on July 17, 1883, to play against a team combined of clubs from Newcastle and Maitland, with South winning the game 6.9.47 to 5.10.40 at the Albion Ground in front of a crowd of approximately 500. The game was part of an onslaught by Victorian administrators to grow the game Australia wide, with the Victorian Football Association believing that the long-term future of the game was for it to be accepted in all six states.

The first recorded schoolboys game took place in 1885 between the Wickham and Wallsend Superior schools, Wickham winning 2.10.22 to 0.5.5. Sydney schools took well to the game, but it didn't receive the same amount of support within Newcastle schools, the publicity being rare and only four schools in Newcastle playing competitively. The Northern District Football Association was established the following year in 1886 on August 30 when the momentum grew to start a competition for the sport in the district. Representatives from Wallsend, Newcastle City and Northumberland, as well as representatives from the Mount Zion, Carlton, Stockton, Summer Hill clubs. The month before, in late July 1886, the Northern District side played host to a Queensland side at the Newcastle Cricket Ground in front of 1,500 people. The game was played while the Northern District side was on the way to an inter-colonial match in Sydney.

The Fitzroy Football Club visited Newcastle in 1888, followed by Port Melbourne the following year in 1889. Fitzroy were set to play a set of four matches during their Newcastle tour: May 26 vs. Maitland District at the Albion Ground, May 29 vs. Maitland Juniors at the Albion Ground, May 31 vs. Newcastle District and June 2 vs Combined North, both in Newcastle. These tours provoked latent celebrations and festivities, and created an unrivalled interest in Australian rules. Both Fitzroy and Port Melbourne were defeated by the Northern District side during their visits, with the Northern District side emerging victorious over Queensland in 1886, again in 1888 over Lillywhite's Rugby Union team and finally a New Zealand Māori side in 1889. By this time, Summer Hill had joined the NDFA and junior teams in Centennials, Carltons and Warwicks. An exhibition game was played in Easter of 1889 in the town of Dungog, north of Maitland, with Merewether joining the NDFA that same year. Exhilaration in Australian rules intensified around the same time as the Black Diamond Challenge Cup was introduced by the Northern District FA. The Black Diamond Challenge Cup created a strong feeling of elation and interest, with association games and representative games being played in front of many numbers of spectators, making Australian rules football the premier sport in the district. A game between Wallsend and Northumberland drew a crowd of almost 4,000 people. Fitzroy returned to Newcastle in 1889 and faced Wallsend, with the game attracting over 5,000 spectators. Special trains, buses, and ferries were undertaken for followers to attend the games. Later in 1889 a combined Northern District side travelled to Victoria to play a series of matches against the VFA, Ballarat, Carlton, St Kilda and Fitzroy.

In 1889, a donation of five guineas each from Northern Districts Football Association (Australian Rules) patron Mr. Stewart Keightley and the proprietors of the Newcastle Morning Herald led to the procurement of the Junior Challenge Cup. This Cup, the Black Diamond, was supplied by A. J. Potter (Alfred John Potter), watchmaker, and jeweller of Hunter Street Newcastle.

The Wallsend club saw a big advantage with the town's two large mines attracting a large number of migrants, many of which were from goldfields in Victoria, and making Wallsend the largest settlement outside of Newcastle. The club had been the dominant club in the competition since 1884 and played Sydney for the premiership of the Colony the following year in 1885. At least 2,000 people watched Wallsend emerge victorious over Sydney at the Wallsend Cricket Ground. However, Wallsend lost the following year, and were not able to win the championship again until 1889. Wallsend played a Tasmanian side in 1890 and recorded a draw.

The Northern District Football Association introduced a junior competition in 1888 and was looking at protecting clubs with less experience from heavy losses by the Wallsenders, in conjunction with the senior association to counter the wider standards in the standards of playing. However, the association had to use a handicapping system for Duncanson Cup matches, as there weren't enough teams to form two grades. This turned out to be unsuccessful, with Wallsend again emerging victorious and the extra men reported to be more of an impediment.

==== Depression ====
In the 1890s the sport began to diminish by the combined effects of the depression at the time, as well as the decline of mines in Newcastle and unsound administration, just as it has established itself as the premier sport in the region and had prospered from the spike in population during the mining boom of the 1880s. Over 7,000 people left the Hunter region, many of those being followers of Australian football. Interest in the game plummeted as cubs were struggling to field teams. By 1895, there were not more Australian rules in Newcastle. Many former players converted to rugby union.

===== Clubs in the Northern District Football Association from 1881–94 =====
A number of clubs had competed in the NDFA from 1881 to 1894 due to the popularity of football, but many had folded within a year, often due to lack of experience

1881: Northumberland

1883: Lambton, Singleton, Newcastle City, Wallsend & Plattsburg

1885: West Maitland Half Holiday Club

1886: Stockton 2nd, Carlton 2nd, Summer Hill, Mount Zion, Rix's Creek, Morpeth

1887: Our Boys 2nd, Hamilton, Northumberland 2nd, Oakhampton 2nd, Lochinvar

1888: Wallsend Juniors, Merewether, Burwood United

1890: Tighes Hill, Broadmeadow Juniors, Charlestown, Vulcans, Rovers, Hamilton Juniors

=== 1900s ===
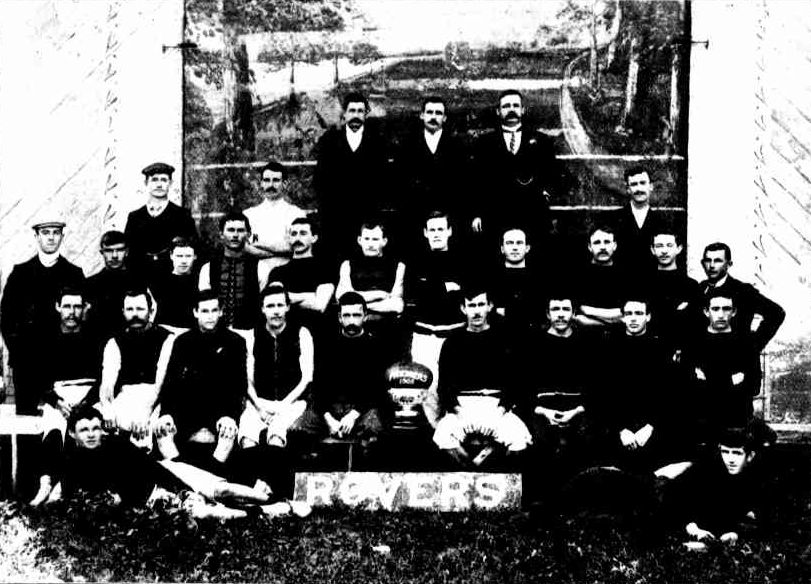
Newcastle club Rovers Northern Districts Football Association Premiers 1905

Some unsuccessful attempts were made to restore Australian rules in Newcastle in 1903, 1919 and 1935. An earlier attempt was made in 1898, which saw the reformation of clubs in Maitland and Wallsend before falling away again in 1903. By 1903, the economy had recovered from the depression of the 1890s. The New South Wales Australian National Football League (NSWANFL) encouraged the now-named Northern District Football League to expand the number of clubs to 18 and number of grades of 3 in 1904. Further support for football was expected to go back up when the Melbourne Football Club visited Newcastle later in 1904. However, only three clubs were skilful enough to play in the senior competition, in which the league asked clubs to develop juniors in an ill-fated attempt to create more senior teams in 1906. By this time many mines in Newcastle were shut down with miners forced to seek employment elsewhere. That same year saw the number of teams reduced to 11 with only one club, Hamilton, remaining in 1907 and the NDFL disbanding before the season had started.

It wasn't until 1919 when the game was played again in Newcastle when miners from Broken Hill, along with 17,000 other people drawn to Newcastle looking for work in heavy industries, set in motion the formation of the Newcastle Australian Rules Football League (NARFL). Most of the players were miners from Broken Hill, Sydney, South Australia, Victoria and Western Australia. The league saw the entry of industry-based clubs BHP, Nailworks and Rylands, as well as the code's confinement to people working in the industry. The sporting public of Newcastle didn't accept Australian rules football, with rugby league being the most popular code in the region by this time, and crowds were small at games with only three to four teams making up the competition. St Kilda, who were now in the Victorian Football League, visited Newcastle again in 1922, making the NARFL confident that the game would gain ground again. During the early 1920s unemployment and legacies from World War I that had ended just four years prior, brought Newcastle to a halt, prompted a number of its population to move away, and saw the recession of the league in 1922 and 1923, which destroyed the minuscule possibility of the sport's revival. Nailworks had folded, and both BHP and Rylands had been heavily weakened. The economy had recovered again in 1924, but Australian rules football didn't, and went into recess in 1925 before returning again in 1935. The game returned with the help from players from Sydney, Broken Hill, and various other places across Australia trying to find jobs in the post-depression industry. The Collingwood and South Melbourne football clubs were sent to Newcastle by the VFL, which didn't do very much in promoting the game. The league that had been reformed relied on clubs in Sydney to play the three clubs in Newcastle at the time to try and grow the game within the city. Again, Newcastle's sporting community wasn't supportive of Australian rules, with the league being abandoned again in 1939 at the start of World War II.

==== Post-World War II ====
The Second World War saw the start of a large industrial development in Newcastle, enticing a large number of workers to the city. From 1943 until 1945, Newcastle industrial worker Alan Gilpin organised social matches of Australian rules between army camps in Maitland and Singleton. A formal platform was adopted, which saw a Newcastle team play challenge games against clubs in Sydney, which Gilpin used to create the Newcastle Australian National Football League (NANFL) in 1948 with the founding clubs of the new league being Broadmeadow, Waratah, Mayfield and Newcastle City. Many of the players of the four clubs were soldiers stationed in Newcastle after the end of WWII or industrial workers from Victoria or South Australia. By 1952, the NANFL had expanded to a number of 14 clubs and 3 grades. Wickham Oval was granted access for the NANFL to use for Finals the following year in 1953. Crowds at NANFL Finals games were good, and the league saw further prestige when player Neil Dunn became the first player in the Newcastle league to represent New South Wales. A third junior grade side was introduced in 1957 and at this point, the clubs in Newcastle had been stronger than they had been in their existence. The league also noted that spectator interest was 'more intense' and more players were attracted to the sport. However, the sport couldn't bear the recession in the early 1960s sufficiently, which saw the loss of many players, crowd numbers dropping, and poor administration, which was damaging to the NANFL. The standard of play within the league plummeted, along with publicity and promotion. The league hit its worst point in 1969 with only three known club to field a senior team, no liaison with schools, and junior football to be scrapped altogether. It was believed that after the elected executives left the office, Australian rules football would never be played again in Newcastle.

Bill Elliott, a former Australian wrestling champion from Victoria, undertook the role of President of the NANFL to salvage the struggling competition. However the disregarding of the game by the Newcastle public and the uncertainty of the sport's future within the region caused the fortunes of football within schools to fluctuate.

By 1970, three new clubs had joined the senior league with the sport gaining momentum when a representative team from Newcastle won the New South Wales Country Championships in 1971. Public awareness of the code had increased, game attendances were starting to be recorded, with record crowds witnessing the Finals series of 1974. It seemed Australian rules was finally accepted in Newcastle. VFL clubs North Melbourne and Geelong were invited to play a promotional game in Newcastle in 1975, organised by the NAFL to '. . . promulgate Australia's National game in Newcastle', the league ensuring as much success as possible by distributing free entry to schoolchildren and having the media publicise the game and also proposing to pay for the expense of both teams, a rather costly mistake. The league was advised to offer the clubs 80% of the gate takings, and if they didn't accept, to forget the game. The league relied on sponsorship generated by raffles, which failed, resulting in the league losing $7,000 and $5,000 being owed to Ansett for transporting the Victorian clubs. However, the NAFL was unable to pay the company, which resulted in rumours spreading that the league could fold. The NAFL, after requesting more time to pay Ansett, imposed a series of levies on its clubs, which were to be paid in five instalments over the course of twelve months. Many clubs were disconcerted with the match's organisation, some even disagreeing with the levy system the league imposed. Waratah-Mayfield and RAAF refused to pay the levies. The matter capitulated although RAAF persisted and didn't compete in the 1976 NAFL season. Gosford, who had joined in 1971, left and became one of the inaugural clubs of the CCAFL.

===== Later 1900s =====
By 1976 the league's future, however, looked promising. There was an extend of support for Australian rules football in Newcastle, which saw the inauguration of the Lions' Cup, a school competition for Newcastle schools. At first there were sixteen schools in Newcastle competing for the Lions' Cup before expanding into Sydney, the Central Coast and the South Coast. 45 schools competed in 1980 and by 1983, a total of 69 schools competed in the Lions' Cup; 15 from Newcastle, 6 from the Central Coast, 6 from the South Coast and 42 from Sydney. Many clubs in the league such as Warners Bay have benefited from the Lions' Cup.

At the end of the 1999 season, it was decided to merge the Newcastle league with the Central Coast league to create a more stable competition, as only 7 clubs and 6 clubs had competed in the Newcastle and Central Coast competitions respectively. This league was known as the Black Diamond Australian Football League from 2000 to 2018. From 2019 onward, it has been known as AFL Hunter Central Coast.

== Clubs ==
The below tables list clubs that have played in the Newcastle AFL since it was reformed in 1948 and before it merged with the Central Coast AFL after the 1999 season.

=== Final ===
Club	Colours	Nickname	Home Ground	Est.	Years in NAFL	NAFL Senior Premierships		Fate
Club	Colours	Nickname	Home Ground	Est.	Years in NAFL	Total	Years	Fate
Cardiff		Hawks	Pasterfield Sports Complex, Cameron Park	1967	1968-1999	3	1979, 1980, 1998	Formed Black Diamond AFL in 2000
Nelson Bay		Marlins	Dick Burwell Oval, Nelson Bay	1980	1980-1999	4	1994, 1996, 1997, 1999	Formed Black Diamond AFL in 2000
Newcastle City		Blues	Newcastle No. 1 Sportsground, Newcastle West	1883	1948-1999	15	1950, 1953, 1961, 1963, 1964, 1965, 1966, 1968, 1970, 1971, 1973, 1973, 1976, 1981, 1995	Formed Black Diamond AFL in 2000
Singleton		Roosters	Rose Point Park, Singleton	1982	1982-1999	1	1985	Formed Black Diamond AFL in 2000
Warners Bay		Bulldogs	Feighan Oval, Warners Bay	1974	1974-1999	6	1984, 1988, 1990, 1991, 1992, 1993	Formed Black Diamond AFL in 2000
West Newcastle-Wallsend		Demons	Hawkins Oval, Wickham	1999	1999	0	-	Formed Black Diamond AFL in 2000

=== Former ===
Club	Colours	Nickname	Home Ground	Est.	Years in NAFL	NAFL Senior Premierships		Fate
Club	Colours	Nickname	Home Ground	Est.	Years in NAFL	Total	Years	Fate
Coalfields United				1923	1923	0	-	Folded after 1923 season
Forster-Tuncurry				1983	1983-1984	0	-	Moved to Mid North Coast AFL in 1985
Gosford		Tigers	Garnet Adcock Memorial Park, West Gosford	1971	1971-1975	0	-	Formed Central Coast AFL in 1976
Hamilton (Broadmeadow 1948-52)				1948	1948-1964	1	1955	Folded after 1964 season
Lakeside					1991	0	-	Folded after 1991 season
Macquarie		Magpies	Tulkaba Park, Teralba	1997	1997-1998	0	-	Recess in 1999, re-formed in Black Diamond AFL in 2000 as Lake Macquarie Crows
Maitland (1)		Magpies		1953	1953-1965	1	1956	Folded after 1965 season
Maitland (2)				1987	1987-1992	0	-	Folded after 1992 season
Mayfield				1948	1948-1962, 1964-1968	2	1951, 1952	Recess in 1963. Folded after 1968 season
Muswellbrook		Cats	Weeraman Fields, Muswellbrook	1983	1988-1993	0	-	Folded after 1993 season, re-formed in North West NSW AFL in 2003
Newcastle University				1970	1970-1972	0	-	Folded after 1972 season
Raymond Terrace					1985-1986	0	-	Folded after 1986 season
Wallsend		Swans	Federal Park, Wallsend	1883	?-1998	1	1989	Merged with West Newcastle to form West Newcastle-Wallsend following 1998 season
Waratah	(1948)(1949-65)			1948	1948-1965	2	1948, 1949	Folded after 1965 season
West Newcastle (Western Suburbs)		Demons	Hawkins Oval, Wickham	1951	1951-1998	11	1954, 1957, 1958, 1959, 1960, 1962	Merged with Wallsend to form West Newcastle-Wallsend following 1998 season
Williamtown (RAAF)		Jets			?-1989	5	1969, 1974, 1977, 1987	Folded after 1989 season

== Newcastle Australian Football League Premiers ==
The competition from 1886 to 1894 was known as the Northern Districts Football Association.

Year	Premiers
1886	Newcastle City
1887	Northumberland
1888	Wallsend
1889	Wallsend
1890	Wallsend
1891	Wallsend
1892	Wallsend
1893	Wallsend
1894	Burwood

The premiers from 1948 to 1999 when the Newcastle Australian National Football League was re-established.

Year	Premiers
1948	Waratah 10.10.70 def Mayfield 6.8.44
1949	Waratah 11.16.82 def Newcastle City 8.18.66
1950	Newcastle City 15.11.101 def Waratah 8.9.57
1951	Mayfield 14.15.99 def Newcastle City 8.15.63
1952	Mayfield 14.8.92 def Western Suburbs 8.16.64
1953	Newcastle City 10.15.75 def Western Suburbs 11.1
1954	Western Suburbs 13.7.85 def Maitland 6.10.46
1955	Hamilton 12.12.84 def Mayfield 7.12.54
1956	Maitland 15.12.102 def Western Suburbs 8.10.58
1957	Western Suburbs 14.14.98 def Maitland 6.11.47
1958	Western Suburbs 10.23.83 def Waratah 3.6.24
1959	Western Suburbs 8.12.60 def Hamilton 7.5.47
1960	Western Suburbs 13.8.86 def Hamilton 3.12.30
1961	Newcastle City 8.8.56 def Hamilton 7.6.48
1962	Western Suburbs 11.18.84 def Hamilton 7.19.61
1963	Newcastle City 13.12.90 def Hamilton 11.15.81
1964	Newcastle City 16.15.111 def Mayfield 4.1.25
1965	Newcastle City 19.16.130 def RAAF 17.12.114
1966	Newcastle City 11.17.83 def RAAF 11.10.76
1967	RAAF 16.22.118 def Newcastle City 6.10.46
1968	Newcastle City 16.18.114 def RAAF 12.13.85
1969	RAAF 9.14.68 def Western Suburbs 5.17.47
1970	Newcastle City 14.19.103 def RAAF 8.13.61
1971	Newcastle City 15.10.100 def RAAF 6.12.48
1972	Army 20.22.142 def Newcastle City 12.4.76
1973	Newcastle City 17.20.122 def Gosford 2.6.18
1974	RAAF 14.14.98 def Cardiff 5.17.47
1975	Newcastle City 16.13.109 def Western Suburbs 12.7.79
1976	Newcastle City 17.17.119 def Western Suburbs 10.8.68
1977	Western Suburbs 12.11.83 def Newcastle City 6.7.43
1978	Western Suburbs 13.14.92 def Newcastle City 13.13.91
1979	Cardiff 7.15.57 def Newcastle City 6.11.47
1980	Cardiff 18.17.125 def Newcastle City 12.6.78
1981	Newcastle City 8.15.63 def Cardiff 8.12.60
1982	Western Suburbs 20.16.136 def Cardiff 11.12.78
1983	Western Suburbs 28.18.186 def Warners Bay 11.10.76
1984	Warners Bay 19.20.134 def Singleton 8.11.59
1985	Singleton 22.14.146 def Warners Bay 9.9.63
1986	Western Suburbs 14.13.97 def Warners Bay 10.14.74
1987	Williamtown 25.22.172 def Nelson Bay 14.13.97
1988	Warners Bay 10.23.83 def Nelson Bay 10.12.72
1989	Wallsend 10.13.73 def Warners Bay 7.11.53
1990	Warners Bay 16.8.104 def Nelson Bay 9.9.63
1991	Warners Bay 17.13.115 def Wallsend 7.9.51
1992	Warners Bay 19.21.135 def Wallsend 6.15.51
1993	Warners Bay 17.18.120 def Western Suburbs 13.10.88
1994	Nelson Bay 21.27.153 def Cardiff 14.9.93
1995	Newcastle City 8.12.60 def Warners Bay 6.8.44
1996	Nelson Bay 15.11.101 def Warners Bay 10.15.75
1997	Nelson Bay 12.12.84 def Cardiff 11.16.82
1998	Cardiff 15.3.103 def Nelson Bay 9.4.58
1999	Nelson Bay 8.5.53 def Cardiff 6.15.51

From 2000 onward the Premiers are listed under the Black Diamond Australian Football League

== See also ==
- AFL NSW/ACT
- Australian rules football in New South Wales
- Black Diamond Australian Football League
