= 1971 National Football League (South Africa) =

National Football League of South Africa season

The 1971 National Football League was the 13th season of the National Football League. It was won by Hellenic.

== Table ==
Pos	Team	Pld	W	D	L	GF	GA	GD	Pts	Qualification
1	Hellenic (C)	26	13	9	4	51	26	+25	35	
2	Cape Town City	26	12	10	4	49	30	+19	34	
3	Durban City	26	14	5	7	60	48	+12	33	
4	Durban United	26	11	9	6	37	26	+11	31	
5	Rangers	26	12	6	8	51	41	+10	30	
6	Germiston Callies	26	10	9	7	39	30	+9	29	
7	Arcadia Shepherds	26	10	8	8	35	41	−6	28	
8	Highlands Power	26	12	2	12	45	36	+9	26	
9	Southern Suburbs	26	8	9	9	35	46	−11	25	
10	Maritzburg	26	9	6	11	41	43	−2	24	
11	Jewish Guild	26	8	5	13	41	46	−5	21	
12	Port Elizabeth City	26	4	8	14	30	54	−24	16	
13	Berea Park	26	4	8	14	25	47	−22	16	
14	East London United	26	5	6	15	28	53	−25	16	
15	Bloemfontein City	0	0	0	0	0	0	0	0 (Note: Bloemfontein City withdrew on 20 May 1971 after 8 matches)	Club withdrew

Updated to match(es) played on unknown. Source:
(C) Champions
