= 1974 National Football League (South Africa) =

National Football League
- Season: 1974
- Champions: Arcadia Shepherds

The 1974 National Football League was the 1974 season of the South African National Football League. It was won by Arcadia Shepherds, with Geoff Wegerle scoring 20 goals. Shepherds also won the Castle Cup and UTC Bowl to win the treble.

== Final table ==
Pos	Team	Pld	W	D	L	GF	GA	GD	Pts	Qualification
1	Arcadia Shepherds	28	16	8	4	50	21	+29	40	Champion of the League
2	Cape Town City	28	17	5	6	40	19	+21	39	
3	Maritzburg	28	15	6	7	47	22	+25	36	
4	Highlands Park	28	14	7	7	37	31	+6	35	
5	Hellenic	28	13	7	8	46	26	+20	33	
6	Durban United	28	12	9	7	36	30	+6	33	
7	Jewish Guild	28	11	9	8	43	43	0	31	
8	Rangers	28	13	4	11	40	27	+13	30	
9	Lusitano	28	8	9	11	30	34	−4	25	
10	Durban Celtic (R)	28	8	8	12	33	40	−7	24	
11	Durban City	28	7	9	12	34	51	−17	23	
12	Germiston Callies	28	8	5	15	23	38	−15	21	
13	Berea Park	28	6	6	16	21	48	−27	18	
14	East London United	28	6	4	18	25	54	−29	16	
15	Boksburg	28	6	4	18	25	56	−31	16	Relegated

Source: rsssf.com
(R) Relegated

== See also ==
- National Football League (South Africa)
