= 1976 National Football League (South Africa) =

National Football League
- Season: 1976
- Champions: Cape Town City

The 1976 National Football League was the penultimate season of the South African National Football League. It was won by Cape Town City.

== Final table ==
Pos	Team	Pld	W	D	L	GF	GA	GD	Pts	Qualification
1	Cape Town City	28	18	7	3	53	24	+29	43	Champion of the League
2	Highlands Park	28	18	6	4	59	24	+35	42	
3	Wits University	28	16	6	6	52	27	+25	38	
4	Hellenic	28	15	7	6	51	27	+24	37	
5	Durban City	28	11	9	8	30	24	+6	31	
6	Durban United	28	11	8	9	35	30	+5	30	
7	Arcadia Shepherds	28	10	9	9	37	34	+3	29	
8	Germiston Callies	28	11	6	11	42	39	+3	28	
9	East London United	28	7	10	11	26	39	−13	24	
10	Guild Apollo	28	10	4	14	35	51	−16	24	
11	Maritzburg	28	8	7	13	41	52	−11	23	
12	Rangers	28	9	4	15	35	43	−8	22	
13	Lusitano	28	8	6	14	32	45	−13	22	
14	Berea Park (R)	28	4	10	14	25	44	−19	18	Relegated
15	Shamrocks (R)	28	2	5	21	22	72	−50	9	Relegated

Source: rsssf.com
(R) Relegated

== See also ==
- National Football League (South Africa)
