= 1975 National Football League (South Africa) =

National Football League
- Season: 1975
- Champions: Highlands Park F.C.

The 1975 National Football League was the 1975 season of the South African National Football League. It was won by Highlands Park F.C.

== Final table ==
Pos	Team	Pld	W	D	L	GF	GA	GD	Pts	Qualification
1	Highlands Park F.C.	28	17	7	4	48	23	+25	41	Champion of the League
2	Hellenic F.C.	28	16	8	4	46	21	+25	40	
3	Maritzburg F.C.	28	13	7	8	44	31	+13	33	
4	Germiston Callies F.C.	28	11	11	6	52	46	+6	33	
5	Arcadia Shepherds F.C.	28	15	1	12	54	34	+20	31	
6	Jewish Guild	28	12	7	9	36	32	+4	31	
7	Cape Town City F.C.	26	11	6	9	42	33	+9	28	
8	Durban United F.C.	28	9	10	9	32	29	+3	28	
9	Durban City F.C.	28	9	9	10	34	34	0	27	
10	Rangers F.C.	28	9	8	11	31	36	−5	26	
11	Shamrocks F.C.	28	9	7	12	36	43	−7	25	
12	Lusitano F.C.	28	6	9	13	34	51	−17	21	
13	Berea Park F.C.	28	6	8	14	27	51	−24	20	
14	East London United F.C.	28	6	7	15	26	45	−19	19	
15	Pinetown Celtic F.C. (R)	28	5	5	18	21	53	−32	15	Relegated

Source: rsssf.com
(R) Relegated

== See also ==
- National Football League (South Africa)
