= Bobby Chalmers =

Footballer in Rhodesia and South Africa (1941–2022)

Personal information
- Full name: Robert Barry Lionel Chalmers
- Date of birth: 19 February 1941
- Place of birth: Bulawayo, Southern Rhodesia
- Date of death: October 2022 (aged 81)
- Place of death: KwaZulu-Natal, South Africa
- Height: 5 ft 7 in (1.70 m)
- Position: Forward

Youth career
- Queens Sports Club

Senior career*
Years	Team	Apps	(Gls)
1962–1966	Durban City	114	(106)
1966–1968	Durban United	60	(50)
1968–1974	Maritzburg	?	(49)

International career
1969	Rhodesia	3	(2)
- * Club domestic league appearances and goals

Robert Barry Lionel Chalmers (19 February 1941 – October 2022) was an association football forward who played professionally for the Rhodesia national team and various clubs in South Africa, where he scored 303 goals in all competitions, making him the all-time top goalscorer in the now-defunct South African National Football League. Chalmers captained the Rhodesian team during its unsuccessful attempt to qualify for the 1970 FIFA World Cup, and was its leading goalscorer. In a profile published in 1980, Chalmers was described by journalist Glen Byrom as a "perfect gentleman and sportsman ... Southern Africa's crown prince of soccer".

Growing up in a sporting family in Bulawayo, Chalmers showed promise in rugby and cricket as well as football. While still an amateur, he played three times for Rhodesia in 1961, in friendly matches against touring English clubs. The following year he moved with his new wife to Durban, South Africa, where he signed for Durban City as a professional. After two years playing on the wing, he became City's centre-forward during the 1964 season and was a great success, scoring 58 goals in all competitions that season and helping his team to win that year's Castle Cup, uniquely scoring a hat-trick in the final. He also performed strongly for a league all-star team in an exhibition game against Real Madrid in September 1964, scoring twice and afterwards receiving praise from visiting defender José Santamaría, a Uruguay international.

In 1966, he was transferred from City to their cross-town rivals, Durban United, for what was then a South African record fee of R20,000. After two successful years with United, he moved again to Maritzburg, where he remained for the rest of his career. In 1969, he was recalled by Rhodesia to captain the national side in its bid to qualify for the World Cup for the first time. As a white man in a mostly black team, he was aided in this task by his fluent proficiency in both Sindebele and Shona. Rhodesia were pitted against a strongly fancied Australian team, but held their opponents to a draw in two successive matches before losing a play-off decider 3–1. Chalmers retired from playing in 1974, forced out of professional football by a knee injury, and became a public relations officer for a Durban hotel chain.

Chalmers died in KwaZulu-Natal in October 2022, at the age of 81.

== Early life and amateur football ==
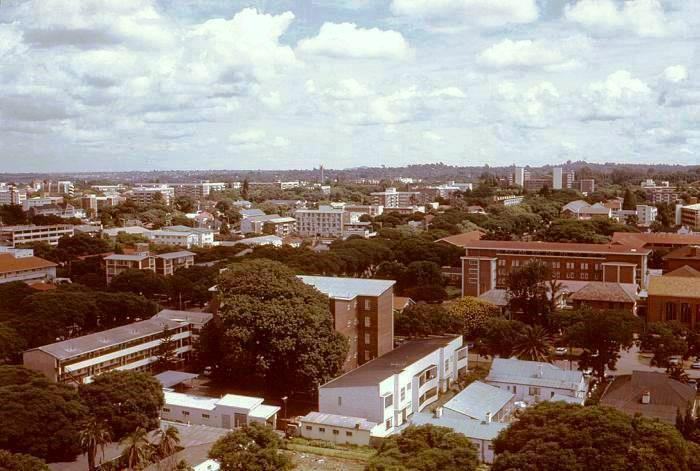
Bulawayo in 1976

Bobby Chalmers was born on 19 February 1941 in Southern Rhodesia's second city of Bulawayo, where he attended Raylton Junior School, Milton Junior School and Milton High School. He grew up in a sporting family, and was inspired by his eldest brother Des, who represented Rhodesia internationally at both rugby union and boxing. Bobby also showed promise at rugby, playing at full-back for the First XV at Milton, and once appeared as the Rhodesia cricket team's twelfth man in a first-class inter-provincial match. However, he proved a more keen football player, and honed his skills as an amateur in the youth teams at Queens Sports Club, usually playing as a winger.

In May 1961, Bulawayo was visited by two English football clubs, West Ham United and Leicester City, who were each touring South Africa and Rhodesia. Both took on the Rhodesia national team at Queens Sports Club, with West Ham doing so twice; Chalmers appeared in all three unofficial friendly matches. Rhodesia lost to West Ham twice, by scores of 3–0 and 5–0, and played against Leicester on 24 May, just 18 days after the tourists had lost that year's FA Cup Final 2–0 to English League champions Tottenham Hotspur. Leicester beat Rhodesia 4–3.

== Professional football career ==
=== Durban City ===
Durban City colours

In early 1962, Chalmers moved with his new wife Audrey to the South African beach city of Durban, where he gained a trial with Durban City of the all-white National Football League (SANFL), the first professional football league in South Africa. He impressed the coaches and signed on as a professional in April 1962. Based at their New Kingsmead ground, Durban City had been formed in May 1959, two months before the SANFL; by 1962, they were one of the country's top teams, having won two of the first three national titles. A key player for the club during its early days was Les Salton, a South African forward who was the SANFL's top goalscorer in each of its first three seasons, netting 117 goals in all competitions, including eight in one game against Johannesburg City in 1961. Chalmers joined just after Salton's sale to local rivals Durban United.

Chalmers initially played as a winger, and scored 20 goals during his first professional season—15 in the league, and five more in cup competitions—as his club finished third in the league, one point behind Highlands Park and Southern Suburbs, another club from Johannesburg. In the Castle Cup, Chalmers received his first winner's medal as part of the Durban City team which beat Johannesburg Ramblers 2–1 in the final at Rand Stadium on 20 October 1962. He started the following season on the wing, but was fielded as a centre forward for the first time in June 1963, when his club took on Kimberley United in a Castle Cup first-round tie. The experiment proved a success, with Chalmers scoring seven in Durban City's 14–1 victory, latterly described by South African Soccer Weekly as a "massacre". The following week, when he was retained as the team's front man for the home game against West Rand United, he scored a hat-trick. He scored four more hat-tricks during the 1963 season, and finished the year with 26 league goals and nine more in other competitions. Durban City once more finished third in the table.

During early 1964, Chalmers prepared thoroughly for the new season, seeking to broaden his style of play and remove some of the perceived technical weaknesses which observers thought had previously let him down; for example, before this time his heading skill had been seen as sub-par, and his passing skill had been little more than ordinary. When the season started, however, it quickly became evident to reporters that his hard work had paid off. In what is generally considered one of his strongest years as a professional, Chalmers progressed significantly during 1964, showing marked improvement in his heading, passing and shooting in particular. According to Byrom, Chalmers was during this period the best player in South Africa, "by far". Alf Boyd, Durban City's Scottish manager, made Chalmers the team's permanent centre-forward seven games into the 1964 season.

For me that game will always stand out. Hitting a brace against such stars was an awesome experience.

— Chalmers remembers the Real Madrid match of 1964, speaking in 2009

Chalmers appeared in two friendly matches against touring teams during this year. First a combined team representing Natal Province lost 8–2 to English side Arsenal, then on 8 September 1964 Real Madrid took on a National Football League all-star team, dubbed the "Castle Knights", in front of 35,000 spectators at Rand Stadium. Byrom says the match was very exciting; "a wonderful soccer spectacle". At half time the score was 3–0 to the visitors, but just after the interval Chalmers pulled one back, beating Uruguay international José Santamaría and another Madrid defender before slamming it into the away net. Santamaria reportedly stood stunned with his hands on his hips, not believing what had happened. Jolted back to attention, the Spanish side rallied and scored twice more before Chalmers scored another "brilliant" goal to make the score 5–2. Although he had finished on the losing side, Chalmers had acquitted himself well—the match is often cited as one of his best games. He was praised afterwards by Santamaria, who had been impressed by his speed and footballing instinct. (Note: These proved to be the last FIFA-sanctioned matches played by foreign clubs in South Africa until 1992; the Football Association of South Africa's FIFA membership was suspended in October 1964 because apartheid required sports matches in South Africa to be racially homogeneous, clashing with FIFA regulations regarding team selection. This proved to part of a wider-scale sporting boycott of South Africa. FIFA's ruling proscribed further tours there, but some individual football players, mostly British, continued to tour South Africa during their off-season as "all-star" or "invitational" XIs.)

Chalmers became one of the league's top forwards, in one match scoring three goals in four minutes against Arcadia Shepherds. In the Castle Cup, his goalscoring exploits consistently helped Durban City to progress. In the quarter-final, he scored what Byrom considers one of the best goals of his career, in a home match against rivals Durban United. United, with Salton leading their front line, scored twice in the first 13 minutes before City closed the gap to 2–1 a minute before the break. Early in the second half, Chalmers collected the ball near the edge of the penalty area and sprinted with it along the 18-yard line, prevented from moving forward by three pursuant United defenders. Chalmers then stopped abruptly and, as his opponents were caught off balance, fired a low shot past them into the net.

City went on to win the match and eventually reach that year's final, against Jewish Guild at Rand Stadium on 10 October 1964. In front of 25,819 fans, the two teams were level at 1–1 before Chalmers scored a hat-trick during the second half to give his side a 4–1 victory. It was the Rhodesian's second cup medal, and the only time a hat-trick was scored in a Castle Cup final. Also scoring freely in the league, Chalmers finished the season with 58 goals in all competitions (two short of Salton's South African record, set in 1960), with 39 of them coming in the league's 32 games. Durban City finished as league runners-up, three points behind Highlands Park, and reached the final of the Life Bowl, where they lost 2–1 to Durban United. The derby match, played at New Kingsmead, attracted 28,881 spectators, over 8,000 more than the previous year's final (in Johannesburg). At the end of the season, Chalmers was named South African Footballer of the Year.

In May 1965, soon into the new South African season, the Rhodesian Football Association's application for full membership in global football federation FIFA was approved, making it eligible to enter competitive international tournaments such as the World Cup for the first time (starting in 1970, as it was too late to enter qualifying for the 1966 tournament). Chalmers scored 38 goals for Durban City during the 1965 season, including 22 in the league, as the club finished third, 11 points behind first-placed Highlands Park. In the Life Bowl, City reached the final, which was played against Cape Town City at Cape Town's Hartleyvale Stadium. Chalmers scored two of his team's goals as Durban City finished 3–1 victors to win the cup for the second time.

After Chalmers scored six goals for Durban City during the early part of the 1966 season, the club sold him to Durban United for a South African record fee of R20,000. Although this record was later surpassed by transfer fees paid for South African-based players by foreign clubs, it remained the most expensive purchase by a South African club when the SANFL was dissolved in 1977. Chalmers' final goalscoring tally for Durban City in all competitions was a club record 157—40 more than Salton.

=== Durban United ===
Durban United colours, 1964–70

Chalmers continued to perform strongly in the colours of Durban United, scoring a further 36 goals (25 in the league) before the year was out, giving him a total of 42 for the 1966 season. United finished the league season in third place, while without Chalmers their rivals City dropped to eighth. In the Life Bowl, United reached the final, where Chalmers scored his team's goal in their 3–1 defeat to Johannesburg Rangers at Rand Stadium.

In 1967, Chalmers scored 24 league goals and 12 in other competitions as United finished fifth in the league, equal on points with Durban City. In one game during this year, against East London City, he scored eight in his team's 13–0 victory. The next season, Durban United finished as league runners-up, four points behind Highlands Park. Chalmers' contribution to the team this year was vastly reduced by a long-term injury; he appeared only six times for United during 1968, and scored only once.

=== Maritzburg ===
Just before the end of the 1968 season, United sold Chalmers to newly promoted Maritzburg, for whom he appeared three times that year without scoring. Maritzburg ended their first year in the top flight in eighth place. During his first full year with the club, 1969, Chalmers scored 12 league goals as Maritzburg finished the season in fifth place. He also played a key role for the club in both cup competitions that year, scoring a combined total of six goals, including the extra-time winner in the Castle Cup final against Cape Town City. In that year's Life Bowl, Maritzburg reached the final, but lost 5–1 to Highlands Park. At the end of the 1969 season, Chalmers was called up by the Rhodesia national team.

== Captain of Rhodesia, 1969 ==
=== Rhodesia enters the World Cup ===
Having become full members of FIFA in May 1965, the Rhodesia national team was eligible to enter the World Cup, but its entry into the qualifying rounds of the 1970 edition, the finals of which would take place in Mexico, caused a significant headache to the tournament's organisers. The political situation regarding Rhodesia, whose mostly white government had declared of independence from Britain in 1965, caused most countries not to accept Rhodesian passports, complicating overseas travel. Participation in international competitions became very difficult as many governments used the international sanctions on Rhodesia as grounds to refuse visas to the country's athletes, despite the fact that Rhodesian sports teams were racially integrated, unlike those of South Africa. As the Rhodesian Football Association had been expelled from the Confederation of African Football for political reasons, FIFA announced in December 1968 that Rhodesia would be placed in World Cup qualifying Group 15A, an Asian–Oceanian section which would see them play against Australia, Japan and South Korea, in an elimination mini-tournament held in the South Korean capital Seoul in October 1969.

A month before the tournament was due to start, the South Korean government abruptly refused to grant visas to the Rhodesian players, citing the country's political situation. This prompted a series of tortuous negotiations between the various football associations and FIFA, which was keen to ensure Rhodesia could still play. Under the compromise ultimately agreed upon, the mini-tournament would go ahead without Rhodesia, and the winner from Seoul would then play Rhodesia over two legs in an as yet undecided "neutral" country. Australia protested that Rhodesia received an unfair advantage in playing fewer matches, but grudgingly went along with this. Australia won the initial qualifying series, while in Group 15B Israel defeated New Zealand over two legs. The winner of the second round matches between Australia and Rhodesia, played in Mozambique, would therefore play Israel for a place in the World Cup finals.

=== Australia vs Rhodesia ===
The Rhodesian team, headed by Scottish manager Danny McLennan, was out of practice, having not played since 1967. A four-game friendly series against Malawi was organised for February 1969, with two games each at home and away. Rhodesia drew 2–2 and won 1–0 in Malawi on 1 and 2 February respectively, then won 4–0 and drew 1–1 at Gwanzura Stadium in Salisbury a week later. Chalmers scored once in the third match. After breaking up for the domestic season soon after, the national side reconvened to begin training for the World Cup qualifying tournament in August 1969, while the South African league season was still going on. The 22-man squad chosen was made up of 13 blacks, seven whites and two coloured (mixed-race) players; according to the Melbourne Age, Rhodesia's key players were Chalmers, Hylton Grainger (another forward, who played for Johannesburg Rangers) and Robin Jordan, who had been the country's first-choice goalkeeper since 1962. The side also included George Shaya, who had just won the inaugural Rhodesian Soccer Star of the Year award for his strong performances up front for Salisbury Dynamos. Because of their professional commitments in South Africa, Chalmers and Grainger remained with their clubs until later.

During late 1969, the Rhodesian team played seven practice matches against local clubs and provincial XIs, and finished the series unbeaten. Chalmers and Grainger joined the squad for the last two warm-up games. Because of his proficiency in the Sindebele and Shona languages, as well as his experience in South Africa and unmatched reputation amongst the Rhodesian players, Chalmers was made the team's captain. With each side desperate to progress to the play-off against Israel, the Australian and Rhodesian football associations were at loggerheads long before the action began on the field. Chalmers personally became the target of protests from Sydney before the teams even travelled to Mozambique, with Australian officials positing that he should not be eligible for Rhodesia, as he was a permanent expatriate in South Africa. FIFA ruled that as a Rhodesian citizen who had never played for South Africa, there was no reason why Chalmers could not play.

Four uninvited Rhodesian officials surreptitiously observed the Australians' first practice session in Mozambique on 18 November. The teams were allowed two training sessions each at the match venue, the newly built 40,000-capacity Estádio Salazar, and during their exercises the Rhodesian squad were soon revealed to be well-drilled, with the Sydney Morning Herald reporter commenting on the high standard of their fitness, athleticism and ball skills, as well as the influence of Chalmers, who he wrote was ably fulfilling his duties as captain: "Chalmers ... their danger man, was all over the pitch cajoling his team to pull out that little bit extra." Observers still considered Australia to be favourites, but Rhodesia's strong form in training, combined with injury problems amongst the Australians, shortened the odds on a Rhodesian victory. As the first leg of the tie approached, supporters travelled from Rhodesia and South Africa to attend. A special train carried fans from Bulawayo, while three chartered flights came from the capital Salisbury.

The first leg of the tie, played in torrential rain before about 6,500 spectators on 23 November 1969, was reportedly an uncultured affair, with the slippery playing conditions affecting both teams' passing and coordinated movement. The Australian team reportedly underperformed significantly, with their forward line struggling to work together against the Rhodesians, who were reported to be technically outclassed, but apparently far more motivated than the Australians, defending doggedly. Exceptional goalkeeping by the Rhodesian goalkeeper Jordan frustrated Australia for much of the game, and earned him glowing praise from reporters representing the Sydney and Melbourne presses. The score remained level until early in the second half, when Chalmers collected a loose ball and shot it past Ron Corry in the Australian goal to make the score 1–0 to Rhodesia. Tommy McColl scored Australia's only goal soon after, and the match ended in a 1–1 draw. Angry at their own poor performance, the Australian players declared Rhodesia to be the worst team they had ever played in a World Cup match, and promised the Australian press a 6–0 victory in the second leg.

Four days later, in the second leg, the Rhodesian underdogs once again frustrated Australia, holding them to a 0–0 draw. A play-off was therefore organised for 29 November; if this tie-breaker still failed to produce a winner, the match would be decided by ballot. The Sydney Morning Herald reporter expected the play-off, attended by less than 3,000, to head the same way as the sides' two previous meetings, but was surprised to see Australia finally find their groove, "spraying pin-point passes all over the field, making Rhodesia look flat-footed by comparison". The Australians took the lead on 12 minutes through a goal from Willie Rutherford, who also contributed to his team's second ten minutes later: Rutherford crossed the ball into the opposing goal area from a free kick, and Rhodesian defender Phillimon Tigere inadvertently headed past Jordan to score an own goal. Jordan left the game after 37 minutes with a bloody wound to his head—the result of a collision with Australia's Ray Baartz—and was replaced between the posts by Stewart Gilbert. After the score remained 2–0 at the interval, Rhodesia fought back during the early second half and halved the gap on 49 minutes, when midfielder Nelson Mapara took advantage of a mix-up amongst the Australian defence to set up Chalmers, who scored. Australia regained a two-goal cushion eight minutes later, however, when a hard shot from Johnny Warren, their captain, ricocheted off Rutherford, past the unsighted Gilbert and into the Rhodesian goal. The match ended 3–1, and Rhodesia were out of the World Cup. Australia coach John Barclay said afterwards that the Rhodesian team had performed well, and given his Australians an unexpectedly difficult time during the qualifying matches; McClennan agreed, and rued the injury in the last game to Jordan, which he said had unsettled his team. Australia lost to Israel 2–1 on aggregate in the final round.

== Style of play ==
Chalmers is widely held to be one of the best football players ever from Rhodesia or Zimbabwe, as well as one of the finest forwards to have played in South Africa. With his burly 5 ft 7 in (1.70 m) frame, sports historian Peter Raath postulates that Chalmers "could quite easily have been a Springbok rugby player". Byrom describes him as "soccer dynamite"; "a graceful stylist, with a supple swerve and cannon-ball shot". Playing as a forward, Chalmers was a strong all-round player, able to skilfully control the ball with both feet and with his head. While able to supply his team-mates with deft passes, he also boasted an exceptionally powerful shot, which while he was playing for Maritzburg was once put to the test with an electronic timer. Chalmers' shot, taken bare-footed, was timed at 78.4 miles per hour (126.2 km/h), just below the speed registered with boots on by Leeds United and Scotland winger Peter Lorimer in an English "hardest shot" competition.

As the captain of Rhodesia in 1969, Chalmers was greatly assisted in his leadership of the mostly black team by his fluent knowledge of both Sindebele and Shona. In his 1980 profile of Chalmers, Byrom described him as "always the perfect gentleman and sportsman", and attested that he "deserved the accolade as Southern Africa's Crown Prince of Soccer".

== Honours and achievements ==
Rhodesia national team
Full internationals only

- 1969: 3 caps (all as captain), 2 goals

Durban City

- South African National Football League: runner-up, 1964
- Castle Cup: winner, 1962, 1964
- Life Bowl: winner, 1965; runner-up, 1964

Durban United

- South African National Football League: runner-up, 1968
- Life Bowl: runner-up, 1966

Maritzburg

- Castle Cup: winner, 1969
- Life Bowl: runner-up, 1969

Individual

- South African Footballer of the Year: 1964
- South African record transfer fee: R20,000, Durban City to Durban United, 1966
- South African National Football League all-time top goalscorer: 303 goals (in all competitions), 1962–74
- Durban City F.C. top goalscorer: 1963, 1964, 1965
- Maritzburg F.C. top goalscorer: 1969, 1970, 1973

== Notes and references ==
Footnote

Bibliography

- Byrom, Glen; McDermott, Dave; Streak, Brian (1980). Rhodesian Sports Profiles, 1907–1979: with a supplementary feature on the Zimbabwe women's hockey team to the Moscow Olympics, 1980. Bulawayo: Books of Zimbabwe. ISBN 978-0-86920-217-3. The section of this book about Chalmers also appears online: see Byrom, Glen (8 January 2012). "Zim's crown prince of soccer". Daily News. Harare: Associated Newspapers of Zimbabwe. Archived from the original on 22 February 2013.
- Geldenhuys, Deon (1990). Isolated States: A Comparative Analysis. Cambridge University Press. ISBN 978-0-521-40268-2.
- Ivor, Neville; Leck, James (1977). South African Sport. Cape Town: Macdonald South Africa. ISBN 978-0-7967-0008-7.
- Raath, Peter (December 2002). Soccer through the years, 1862–2002. Cape Town: P. Raath. ISBN 978-0-620-29805-6.
