= 1977 National Football League (South Africa) =

National Football League
- Season: 1977
- Champions: Highlands Park

The 1977 National Football League was the final season of the South African National Football League before it folded into the non-racial National Professional Soccer League. It was won by Highlands Park.

== Final table ==
Pos	Team	Pld	W	D	L	GF	GA	GD	Pts	Qualification
1	Highlands Park F.C.	24	17	3	4	52	20	+32	37	Champion of the League
2	Lusitano F.C.	24	15	7	2	38	10	+28	37	
3	Durban United F.C.	24	13	7	4	32	15	+17	33	
4	Hellenic F.C.	24	11	4	9	35	29	+6	26	
5	Wits University F.C.	24	9	8	7	21	24	−3	26	
6	Arcadia Shepherds F.C.	24	9	8	7	31	27	+4	26	
7	Maritzburg F.C.	24	6	9	9	32	31	+1	21	
8	Durban City F.C.	24	8	5	11	31	36	−5	21	
9	East London United F.C.	24	6	6	12	20	31	−11	18	
10	Rangers F.C.	24	5	8	11	21	34	−13	18	
11	Cape Town City F.C.	24	6	5	13	22	35	−13	17	
12	Roodepoort Guild (Note: Previously Guild Apollo)	24	5	5	14	18	38	−20	15	
13	Germiston Callies F.C.	24	5	4	15	17	49	−32	14	

Source: rsssf.com
Notes:

NB: 3 more losses than wins; odd number of draws; 9 more goals conceded than scored.

== See also ==
- National Football League (South Africa)
