= Roger Hugo =

English footballer (1942–2024)

- Hugo with West Ham United

Personal information
- Full name: Roger Victor Hugo
- Date of birth: 6 September 1942
- Place of birth: Woking, England
- Date of death: April 2024 (aged 81)
- Place of death: Johannesburg, South Africa
- Position: Inside forward

Youth career
- West Ham United

Senior career*
Years	Team	Apps	(Gls)
1960–1965	West Ham United	3	(2)
1965–1966	Watford	25	(6)
1966–1968	Port Elizabeth City		
1968–1970	Highlands Park		
- Berea Park
- * Club domestic league appearances and goals

Roger Victor Hugo (6 September 1942 – April 2024) was an English footballer who played as an inside forward.

== Career ==
Hugo began his career with West Ham United, signing his first professional contract with the club in October 1960. On 18 May 1964, Hugo made his debut for West Ham, scoring in a 2–2 draw away to Leicester City in the First Division. Ten days later, Hugo made his second appearance for West Ham, scoring the only goal in a 1–0 win against West Bromwich Albion. A further three days later, Hugo would make his final appearance for the club in a 3–0 loss against Stoke City, as he found opportunities once against limited following the return of John Sissons from the 1964 UEFA European Under-18 Championship.

In the summer of 1965, Hugo signed for Third Division side Watford. During his only season at Watford, Hugo scored six league goals in 25 appearances as Watford finished midtable. In 1966, Hugo moved to South Africa, signing for Port Elizabeth City, winning the National Football League with the club in 1967. Hugo spent two years at Port Elizabeth, before joining Highlands Park. Hugo later played for Berea Park.

== Personal life ==
Following his playing career, Hugo settled in Johannesburg, owning a video company.

In April 2024, West Ham United announced Hugo's death.
