= Jorge Santoro =

Brazilian football player and coach

Personal information
- Full name: Jorge Santoro Herrmann
- Place of birth: Belo Horizonte, Brazil
- Date of death: 26 February 2011 (aged 66)
- Position: Midfielder

Senior career*
Years	Team	Apps	(Gls)
1964–1965	Hellenic	?	(?)
1966–1967	Highlands Park	49	(20)
1968–1970	Powerlines	?	(?)
1971	Highlands Power	3	(0)
1971–1972	Berea Park	?	(?)
1973	Arcadia Shepherds	?	(?)
1974	Johannesburg Corinthians	?	(?)
Total		?	(?)

Managerial career
- –: Moroka Swallows
- –: Lusitano
- –: Giant Blackpool
- * Club domestic league appearances and goals

Jorge Santoro Herrmann (died 26 February 2011) was a Brazilian professional football player and coach.

== Career ==
Born in Belo Horizonte, Santoro moved to South Africa in 1964 to play for Hellenic, and also later played for Highlands Park before retiring due to injuries sustained in a car crash back in Brazil. Upon his return to South Africa, Santoro was active as a coach, working for such teams as Moroka Swallows, Lusitano and Giant Blackpool.
