= Kai Johansen =

Danish footballer (1940-2007)

Personal information
- Date of birth: 23 July 1940
- Place of birth: Odense, Denmark
- Date of death: 13 May 2007 (aged 66)
- Position: Full-back

Senior career*
| Years | Team | Apps | (Gls) |
| –1963 | Odense BK | | |
| 1963–1965 | Morton | 33 | (0) |
| 1965–1970 | Rangers | 158 | (4) |

International career
| 1960–1961 | Denmark U21 | 8 | (0) |
| 1962–1963 | Denmark | 20 | (0) |

Managerial career
- 1970–1972: Cape Town City
- 1973–1975: Arcadia Shepherds
- * Club domestic league appearances and goals

Kai Johansen (23 July 1940 – 13 May 2007) was a Danish professional footballer who played as a full-back. He spent a large proportion of his career playing in Scotland with Rangers.

== Career ==
Born in Odense, Johansen began his football career in the small club of Korsløkke before moving to Boldklubben 1909 in Odense as a striker. However, he was not successful, and moved to another of the major clubs in the city, Odense Boldklub. Here he found his natural place as a right full back and soon attracted attention from the Denmark national team manager. Johansen made his debut as a member of the national team on 11 June 1962 against Hungary. The following year and a half he played 20 national matches.

After attracting international interest, Johansen was the first of a number of Scandinavian players signed by Morton in 1964.

The following year, Johansen signed for Rangers on 24 June 1965 for £20,000 after impressing manager Scot Symon with his performance for a European Select side against a UK Select in Stanley Matthews' testimonial. He scored for Rangers in the 1966 Scottish Cup Final against Celtic, sealing a 1–0 win for Rangers and becoming the first foreign player to score in the final. This cup victory earned Rangers qualification to the following season's UEFA Cup Winners' Cup. Johansen featured throughout the run to the 1967 European Cup Winners' Cup Final – Rangers' second in their history – including scoring a goal in the 2–1 first leg win against Borussia Dortmund, the holders, who Rangers knocked out of the tournament. He played in the final which Rangers lost 1–0 in extra-time to Bayern Munich.

Becoming a professional footballer excluded Johansen from the national team, which at the time entirely consisted of amateurs. He undoubtedly would have had many more caps without this rule.

He retired in 1970 and returned to a career as a store owner. Before his career in Scotland, he had established a men's wear store in Odense. He also ran pubs in Glasgow and on the Costa del Sol, before becoming a player's agent.

In 1970 Johansen moved to South Africa with joining Cape Town City. At another South African side Arcadia Shepherds he managed the club's treble-winning side of 1974.

He was diagnosed with cancer in 2006 and died on 13 May 2007. His death was marked with a minute's silence before Rangers' match against Kilmarnock that day.

== Honours ==
=== Player ===
Rangers

- European Cup Winners Cup: runner-up 1966–67
- Scottish Cup: 1965–66; runner-up 1968–69

=== Manager ===
Arcadia Shepherds

- National Football League (South Africa): 1974
- NFL Cup: 1974
- NFL UTC Bowl Cup: 1974
