= Vic McKinney =

Northern Irish footballer

Personal information
- Date of birth: c. 1945
- Place of birth: Lurgan, Northern Ireland
- Date of death: 1987 (aged 42)
- Place of death: South Africa
- Position: Left winger

Senior career*
Years	Team	Apps	(Gls)
1961–1964	Glenavon		
1964–1968	Falkirk	56	(9)
1968–1969	Addington/Durban Spurs		
1970–1971	Durban United		
1972–1975	Cape Town City		

International career
1966	Northern Ireland	1	(0)
- * Club domestic league appearances and goals

Victor J. McKinney (c. 1945 – 1987) was a Northern Irish footballer who played as a left winger.

== Career ==
Born in Lurgan, McKinney played for Glenavon, Falkirk, Addington/Durban Spurs, Durban United and Cape Town City. He also earned one cap for the Northern Ireland national team.

He died in a car accident in 1987, in which his son, also called Victor, was paralysed.
