= Cliff Durandt =

South African soccer player

Personal information
- Full name: Clifford Michael Durandt
- Date of birth: 16 April 1940
- Place of birth: Johannesburg, South Africa
- Date of death: 3 October 2002 (aged 62)
- Place of death: Johannesburg, South Africa
- Position: Winger

Youth career
- 1956–1957: Marist Brothers
- 1957–1958: Wolverhampton Wanderers

Senior career*
Years	Team	Apps	(Gls)
1958–1962	Wolverhampton Wanderers	43	(9)
1962–1965	Charlton Athletic	36	(4)
1965–1966	Germiston Callies	25	(3)
1967	Highlands Park	16	(6)
1968	State House Tornados	5	(0)
1969	Durban United		
1969–1971	Maritzburg		
- * Club domestic league appearances and goals

Clifford Michael Durandt (16 April 1940 – 3 October 2002) was a South African footballer who played as a winger.

He played in the English First Division for Wolverhampton Wanderers, with whom he won the league title. He is the father of a boxing promoter and trainer Nick Durandt.

== Career ==
After being educated at the King Edward VII School in his hometown Johannesburg, Durandt began his football career with Marist Brothers. In May 1957, just 17 years old, he was selected to play for a South Africa XI against tourists Wolverhampton Wanderers, where his display - he scored twice in a 3-7 loss - earned him a move to the English club.

As a junior, he played in Wolves' 1958 FA Youth Cup triumph, before making his senior debut on 4 October 1958 in a 4–0 rout of Manchester United. This was his only appearance of the campaign in which the club retained the league championship.

He featured only sporadically until enjoying a run of games during the 1960–61 season, replacing his departed countryman Des Horne. Durandt scored eight times during the campaign to help the club reach third. However, the following seasons saw him again unable to hold down a regular spot and he moved to Charlton Athletic in March 1963 for £15,000.

He made 36 league appearances in the Second Division for the Addicks, before returning to his homeland. Here, he played for Germiston Callies, Highlands Park and State House Tornados, among others. A high point during his spell with Highlands Park was contributing a hat-trick towards a 10-2 victory against Olympia in a league game on 7 June 1967. (Walter da Silva (6) and Willie McIntosh scored the others).

He died on 3 October 2002 aged 62 after suffering a heart attack.
