= Wally Gould =

English footballer (1938–2018)

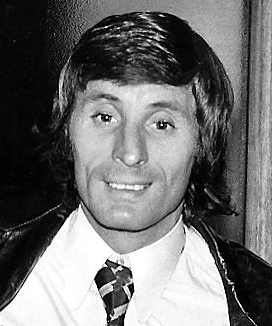
- Gould in the early 1970s

Personal information
- Full name: Walter Gould
- Date of birth: 25 September 1938
- Place of birth: Thrybergh, West Riding of Yorkshire, England
- Date of death: 10 March 2018 (aged 79)
- Place of death: Greenwich, Greater London, England
- Position: Right winger

Senior career*
Years	Team	Apps	(Gls)
- Rawmarsh Welfare
1958–1961	Sheffield United	5	(1)
1961–1964	York City	120	(25)
1964–1967	Brighton & Hove Albion	168	(45)
1967	→ Hellenic (loan)		
1968	Durban United		
1969	East London Celtic		
1969–1973	Hellenic		
1973–1974	Guildford City		
1974	Hellenic		
1975	East London United		
1976–1977	Durban City		
1977–1978	Chelmsford City		
Total		293	(71)
- * Club domestic league appearances and goals

Walter Gould (25 September 1938 – 10 March 2018) was an English professional footballer who played as a right winger in the Football League for Sheffield United, York City and Brighton & Hove Albion. He later played for Durban United and Hellenic in South Africa.

Gould arrived on the Stoke City coaching staff at the start of the 1977–78 season to team up with George Eastham who had become manager. He was reserve-team coach when Cyril Lea resigned in New Year 1980. Gould then stepped up to be number two to Alan Durban. He subsequently served Richie Barker when he became manager, but left in March 1982. There were rumoured to be differences between Gould and some of the senior players at this time, with one `training ground incident` resulting in Ray Evans, the captain, being suspended for two weeks. Days later Gould was replaced by Bill Asprey.

== Career statistics ==
Appearances and goals by club, season and competition
Club	Season	League			FA Cup		League Cup		Total	
Club	Season	Division	Apps	Goals	Apps	Goals	Apps	Goals	Apps	Goals
Sheffield United	1958–59	Second Division	5	1	0	0	—		5	1
York City	1960–61	Fourth Division	13	3	0	0	0	0	13	3
York City	1961–62	Fourth Division	41	6	1	0	7	0	48	6
York City	1962–63	Fourth Division	42	11	3	0	2	1	47	12
York City	1963–64	Fourth Division	25	6	1	0	4	0	30	6
York City	Total		120	25	5	0	13	1	138	26
Brighton & Hove Albion	1963–64	Fourth Division	18	3	0	0	0	0	18	3
Brighton & Hove Albion	1964–65	Fourth Division	43	21	1	0	2	0	46	21
Brighton & Hove Albion	1965–66	Fourth Division	41	10	3	1	3	0	47	11
Brighton & Hove Albion	1966–67	Fourth Division	42	9	6	0	6	0	54	9
Brighton & Hove Albion	1967–68	Fourth Division	24	2	2	0	2	0	28	2
Brighton & Hove Albion	Total		168	45	12	1	13	0	193	46
Career total			293	71	17	1	26	1	336	73
