= George Luke (footballer, born 1948) =

English footballer

Personal information
- Date of birth: 9 December 1948 (age 77)
- Place of birth: Hetton-le-Hole, England
- Position: Midfielder

Youth career
- Liverpool
- 1964–1966: Newcastle United
- 1966–1967: Chelsea

Senior career*
| Years | Team | Apps | (Gls) |
| 1967–1968 | Chelsea | 1 | (0) |
- Durban City
- East London United
- Jewish Guild
- Highlands Park
| 1976–1979 | St Patrick's Athletic | | |

International career
- England Schoolboys
- * Club domestic league appearances and goals

George Luke (born 9 December 1948) is an English former professional footballer who played as a midfielder.

== Club career ==
Born in Hetton-le-Hole, Luke was initially scouted by Manchester United, with a scout reportedly sent to his house each weekend, offering the family £30 each time for Luke to sign. He started his career with Liverpool, where he expressed his concern to then-assistant manager Bob Paisley that teammate Tommy Smith would be ahead of him in consideration for the first team, to which Paisley reportedly replied "Oh him. He's absolutely rubbish. You'll have no trouble."

He signed for Newcastle United at the age of fifteen, where he was made to train in heavy black boots with a steel toe cap. He then signed for Chelsea, where his steel toe cap boots were ridiculed by teammates. After suffering with homesickness, manager Tommy Docherty offered to sign one of his friends to help. Despite making one appearance for Chelsea in the league in the 1966–67 season, Luke handed in a transfer request as he was still unsettled at the West-London club.

He became the first British player to sign for a transfer fee in South Africa when he moved in 1968 to sign for Durban City. He went on to play for East London United, Jewish Guild and Highlands Park. While at Highlands Park, he played against Ballon d'Or winner George Best, who had moved to South Africa to sign for Jewish Guild. Following the game, the two would go drinking together.

Luke left South Africa in 1976; following the Soweto uprising he had grown concerned for his family's safety, and he moved to Ireland, where he spent three seasons with St Patrick's Athletic.

== International career ==
Luke represented the England Schoolboys.
