= Freddie Bunce =

English footballer (1938–1991)

Personal information
- Full name: Frederick Bunce
- Date of birth: 16 February 1938
- Place of birth: Bushey, England
- Date of death: 9 October 1991 (aged 53)
- Place of death: Victoria, Australia

Youth career
- Watford Boys Club

Senior career*
Years	Team	Apps	(Gls)
1955–1962	Watford	150	(34)
1962–1963	Cambridge United		
1963–1964	Cambridge City		
1964	Highlands Park	32	(18)
1965	Boksburg	15	(4)
1966–1967	Germiston Callies	22	(5)
1967–1969	Bedford Town		
1969–1974	Ringwood City Wilhelmina		

International career
- England Youth
- * Club domestic league appearances and goals

Frederick Bunce, also known as Freddie or Frank Bunce (16 February 1938 – 9 October 1991) was an English footballer. He played as a left winger in England and later South Africa. He briefly returned to England as a coach, but then emigrated to Australia, where he spent the remainder of his life.

== Career ==
Born in Bushey, Bunce grew up in the local area, representing Hertfordshire as a schoolboy. He joined Watford as an amateur in September 1955, turning professional later in the year. His first competitive appearance came on 22 October 1955, in a 2–0 English Football League Third Division South defeat at Southampton. Bunce's first goal came three days later, in a Southern Floodlit Cup fixture against Aldershot Town, and his first Football League goal on 29 October against Shrewsbury Town. Despite this early form, Bunce's appearances in his first three seasons at Watford were limited; he made twelve in 1955–56, two in 1956–57, and none in 1957–58. Nonetheless, during this period Bunce became the first Watford player to play for England at youth level since Fred Fayers in 1910.

Bunce established himself as a frequent member of the first team squad in 1958–59, making 26 appearances in all competitions. He followed this up with 32 appearances in 1959–60, as Watford secured promotion from the Fourth Division. After missing the first three games of the following season, Bunce scored his first career hat-trick, in a 6–1 win over Brentford at Vicarage Road on 30 August 1960. He played in all of Watford's remaining league games, finishing the season with 16 goals from 43 appearances. The club finished the season in 4th position, at the time their highest ever Football League placing. He followed this up with 11 goals from 51 appearances in 1961–62. After making seven appearances in the first four months of the following season, Bunce transferred to Cambridge United, and shortly afterwards also played for their rivals, Cambridge City.

Bunce emigrated to South Africa in February 1964, joining Highlands Park. His one season there was successful, as the club won the National Football League. He then spent two years at Germiston Callies, before returning to England to coach Bedford Town in 1967. By 1969 he had emigrated to Australia, where he played for Whilmena and Ringwood. He remained in the country after his retirement as a player, coaching youth players. Bunce died on 9 October 1991, aged 53.
