= Durandt =

Durandt is a German surname, a variant of Durand, derived after the given name Durand of French origin.. The latter one comes from Latin durare, 'to endure'. In some cases it comes from the nickname Durant, 'persistent', 'stubborn' in Old French. Notable people with the surname include:

- Cliff Durandt, South African soccer player
- Luc Durandt, South African born English cricketer
- Nick Durandt, South African boxing trainer and manager
