= Ian Towers =

English footballer and manager

Personal information
- Full name: Ian Joseph Towers
- Date of birth: 11 October 1940
- Place of birth: Consett, England
- Date of death: 25 January 2015 (aged 74)
- Place of death: Cape Town, South Africa
- Position: Forward

Youth career
- –1957: Burnley

Senior career*
Years	Team	Apps	(Gls)
1957–1966	Burnley	44	(12)
1966–1968	Oldham Athletic	95	(45)
1968–1970	Bury	49	(7)
1971–1972	Cape Town City		
- Hellenic
Total		188	(64)

Managerial career
- 1977: Glenville
- 1978: Greenpoint
- 1979–1981: Bellville City
- 1982–1985: Hellenic
- 1985–1992: Bellville City
- * Club domestic league appearances and goals

Ian Joseph Towers (11 October 1940 – 25 January 2015) was an English professional footballer who played as a forward in the Football League for Burnley, Oldham Athletic and Bury and in South Africa for Cape Town City and Hellenic. He also went on to manage in South Africa with Glenville, Greenpoint, Bellville City and Hellenic.

== Career ==
Born in Blackhill, Consett, County Durham, Towers started his career with Burnley joining the club as a schoolboy before signing professional terms with the club in October 1957. He made his debut for the club in April 1961 in a 1–0 win over Birmingham City, and went on to make ten appearances in the 1961–62 season. He played in the last five of seven games of the season but was left out of the 1962 FA Cup Final defeat to Tottenham Hotspur, being named as twelfth man. He started to break into the side during the 1964–65 season, playing in half of the games on the left wing, competing for places with Ralph Coates and Johnny Price. The 1965–66 season saw the introduction of substitutes in English football, and Towers made history becoming Burnley's first substitute when he replaced Willie Irvine in a 2–2 draw against Arsenal in August 1965. His final game for the club came in September 1965, in a 4–0 win over Doncaster Rovers at Belle Vue. In total he made 51 appearances for the Clarets scoring 14 goals in all competitions. In January 1966 he moved to Football League Third Division side Oldham Athletic for £20,000. He made his debut for the club in a 1–0 defeat to Shrewsbury Town and went on to score a brace in his next game against Oxford United. In his second season for the club he played in every league game, scoring 27 goals to keep Oldham in the Third Division. He made a total of 95 league appearances for Oldham scoring 45 goals before he joined Football League Second Division side Bury in 1968. He couldn't stop Bury from getting relegated in his first season with the club, but he went on to make 52 appearances for the Shakers, scoring 7 goals before emigrating to South Africa in 1970. In 1971, he signed for National Football League side Cape Town City, where he went to play two seasons later joining Hellenic before his career was cut short by injury. In 1973, he was appointed assistant manager at Cape Town City, where he held that position for two years. He managed South African sides Glenville, Greenpoint, Bellville City and Hellenic between 1977 and 1992, and was later youth coach and scout for many years at Seven Stars and Ajax Cape Town.

== Death ==
Towers died on 25 January 2015 at the age of 74, in Cape Town, South Africa, leaving behind his wife Pat and their two sons and daughters.

== Sources ==
- Ian Towers at Post War English & Scottish Football League A–Z Player's Transfer Database. Retrieved 26 January 2015.
