= Jackie Maltby =

English footballer

Personal information
- Date of birth: 31 July 1939
- Place of birth: Consett, England
- Position: Inside forward

Youth career
- Sunderland

Senior career*
Years	Team	Apps	(Gls)
1956–1961	Sunderland	22	(4)
1961–1965	Darlington	115	(32)
1965–1967	Bury	57	(8)
1967–1972	Southern Suburbs		
- * Club domestic league appearances and goals

John Maltby (born 31 July 1939), known as Jackie or Jack Maltby, is an English former footballer who made 119 appearances in the Football League playing for Sunderland, Darlington and Bury in the 1950s and 1960s. He played as an inside forward. He went on to play in the South African National Football League for Southern Suburbs.

== Life and career ==
Maltby was born in Consett, County Durham. He began his football career as a youngster with Sunderland, and made his first-team debut as a 17-year-old, on 10 November 1956 in the First Division match at home to Chelsea. Sunderland lost 3–1. He scored his first league goal a year later, in a 1–1 draw at home to Portsmouth for which he had been flown home from Germany where he was doing his National Service. The pseudonymous "Argus", writing in the Sunderland Echo, "fanc[ied] that few supporters would fail to take encouragement from the talented play of 18-year-olds Maltby and Godbold." Over five seasons as part of the first-team squad, Maltby scored four times from 23 appearances in senior competition, and at the end of the 1960–61 season, he moved on to Fourth Division club Darlington.

He remained with Darlington for four seasons, playing part-time while working as a sports teacher, and scored 36 goals from 124 appearances in league and cups. He then spent two years at Bury, before moving to South Africa where he played for Johannesburg-based club Southern Suburbs in the National Football League. He was ever-present in his first season with the club, and played in the UTC Bowl Final as Southern Suburbs lost to Durban City. Three years later he was on the winning side as his club beat the same opponents after two replays. By the end of the 1971 season, Maltby had amassed 61 goals for the club.
