= Joe Caven =

Scottish footballer (1936–2023)

Personal information
- Full name: John Brown Caven
- Date of birth: 11 October 1936
- Place of birth: Kirkintilloch, Scotland
- Date of death: 13 August 2023 (aged 86)
- Position: Centre forward

Senior career*
Years	Team	Apps	(Gls)
1956–1962	Airdrieonians	83	(42)
1962	Brighton & Hove Albion	10	(0)
1962–1963	Raith Rovers	11	(4)
1963–1965	Greenock Morton	41	(18)
1965–1966	Addington	15	(14)
1966	Germiston Callies	17	(8)
1966–1967	Stirling Albion	3	(0)
Total		180	(86)
- * Club domestic league appearances and goals

John Brown "Joe" Caven (11 October 1936 – 13 August 2023) was a Scottish footballer, best known for playing with Greenock Morton and Airdrieonians in the Scottish Football League. He was a centre forward.

Born in Kirkintilloch, Caven also played for Airdrie, Brighton & Hove Albion, Raith Rovers, Greenock Morton, and Stirling Albion, with a short time in South Africa playing for Addington and Germiston Callies.

Having been given a free transfer by Raith Rovers at the end of the 1962–63 season, in July 1963, Caven signed for Inverness Caledonian, a Highland Football League club at that time, on the basis that if a Scottish League club came along for him he would be released from his contract by Inverness Caledonian. Within weeks after signing for Inverness Caledonian, Greenock Morton signed Caven and therefore he never appeared for Inverness Caledonian in the Highland Football League. Caven later lived in Nairn, near Inverness, in the North of Scotland.

Caven died on 13 August 2023, at the age of 86.
