= Castle Cup =

Castle Cup may refer to:

- Sunfoil Series, a South African cricket competition known as the Castle Cup between 1990 and 1996.
- Castle Cup (association football), a South African association football competition between 1959 and 1977.
