= Roy Wegerle =

American football player (born 1964)

Personal information
- Date of birth: March 19, 1964 (age 62)
- Place of birth: Pretoria, South Africa
- Positions: Striker; midfielder

Youth career
- 1980–1981: Arcadia Shepherds

College career
Years	Team	Apps	(Gls)
1982–1983	South Florida Bulls		

Senior career*
Years	Team	Apps	(Gls)
1984	Tampa Bay Rowdies	21	(9)
1984	Arcadia Shepherds		
1984–1986	Tacoma Stars (indoor)	59	(36)
1986–1988	Chelsea	15	(3)
1988	→ Swindon Town (loan)	7	(1)
1988–1989	Luton Town	45	(10)
1989–1992	Queens Park Rangers	65	(29)
1992–1993	Blackburn Rovers	11	(4)
1993–1995	Coventry City	53	(9)
1996–1997	Colorado Rapids	36	(4)
1997–1998	D.C. United	24	(7)
1998	Tampa Bay Mutiny	12	(1)
Total		394	(114)

International career
1992–1998	United States	41	(7)

Managerial career
- 1996: Colorado Rapids (interim)
Medal record
Representing United States
Runner-up	CONCACAF Gold Cup	1993
Runner-up	CONCACAF Gold Cup	1998
- * Club domestic league appearances and goals

Roy Wegerle (born March 19, 1964) is a former professional soccer and golf player.

Wegerle was a United States international player who appeared for the national team 41 times between 1992 and 1998. Born and raised in South Africa, he was naturalized as a U.S. citizen in 1991. Since retiring from soccer he has become a professional golfer.

As a soccer player, Wegerle was a striker from 1984 until 1998. He notably played in the English Premier League for Queens Park Rangers, Blackburn Rovers and Coventry City, and in the English Football League for Chelsea, Swindon Town and Luton Town. He made appearances in the United States for Tampa Bay Rowdies, Tacoma Stars, Colorado Rapids, D.C. United and Tampa Bay Mutiny, and was a member of the United States squad at the 1994 and 1998 World Cups. Wegerle is one of two players who played in both the NASL and MLS; the other is Hugo Sánchez.

== Club career ==
=== Early career ===
Born in Pretoria, Wegerle's soccer career began at the city's Waterkloof Primary School. Surrounded by teammates Clifford Rostowsky, Deon Stein and David Kroser, Wegerle's talents developed rapidly. He soon earned an invitation to join the local adult club Arcadia Shepherds, where his brothers had enjoyed long, successful careers.

=== Tampa Bay Rowdies ===
Following an unsuccessful trial with Manchester United in 1980, Wegerle chose to play college soccer in the United States. He spent two seasons with the University of South Florida's team, the South Florida Bulls, in 1982 and 1983 and holds the school's single season scoring record with 21 goals. The Tampa Bay Rowdies of the North American Soccer League drafted Wegerle in the first round of the 1984 NASL college draft. He would play 21 games and score 9 goals, adding 17 assists, during the last year of the NASL's existence in 1984, being named league's Rookie of the Year. More significantly, Rodney Marsh coached him at Tampa Bay. This association would be integral to Wegerle's future move to England. When the league folded, Wegerle moved indoors with the Tacoma Stars of the Major Indoor Soccer League for two seasons. At the University of South Florida, Wegerle came under the professional instruction of ex-Chelsea striker and European Cup Winners' Cup winner Derek Smethurst, who grounded him and got him ready for his professional career.

=== Chelsea ===
In 1986, Marsh, a former Queens Park Rangers star, worked his contacts in England to get Wegerle a tryout. While QPR passed on Wegerle at the time, Chelsea were sufficiently impressed to offer Wegerle a contract. However, Wegerle never played consistently for the Chelsea first team and on March 24, 1988, Chelsea loaned Wegerle to Swindon Town for the last seven games of the season.

=== Luton Town and QPR ===
At the end of the season, Chelsea sold Wegerle to Luton Town. In his time with Luton, Wegerle became the team's leading scorer and was sold in December 1989 to Queens Park Rangers for £1 million. He finished the 1990–91 season third on the First Division's scoring table, including having the honor of receiving the ITV 'Goal of the Season' award for that season (against Leeds at Elland Road). Wegerle continued to thrive at QPR until the arrival of new manager Gerry Francis who had little use for Wegerle and sold him in March 1992.

=== Blackburn Rovers ===
He joined Blackburn Rovers for £1.1 million – a joint record fee to be paid by a Second Division club. He helped Blackburn reach the new FA Premier League as Second Division playoff winners in May 1992, but his first team chances were then dented by the arrival of Alan Shearer at Ewood Park, who led the forward line with Mike Newell.

=== Coventry City ===
The 1992–93 season saw yet another transfer for Wegerle as Blackburn sold him to Coventry City in March 1993 for £1 million after only 22 games. Despite a series of injuries, Wegerle played 53 league games for Coventry, scoring nine goals, until his contract expired at the end of the 1994–95 season.

=== Colorado Rapids ===
In 1996, Wegerle signed with Major League Soccer (MLS). At the time, the newly established league was signing known players and allocating them to each of the league's teams in order to ensure an initial parity of talent. As part of this process, MLS allocated Wegerle to the Colorado Rapids. However, he enjoyed little success in MLS.

=== D.C. United ===
He played a season and a half for Colorado before the team traded him to D.C. United for Steve Rammel 14 games into the 1997 season. Aside from scoring four goals over 36 games with the Rapids, Wegerle also served a single game as caretaker head coach after Bobby Houghton was fired. When Wegerle arrived in D.C., he joined a team on its way to the league championship. While his scoring pace increased slightly, five goals over 19 regular and post-season games, Wegerle failed to produce as United coach Bruce Arena expected.

=== Tampa Bay Mutiny ===
As a result, Wegerle became part of what is considered the most lop-sided trade in league history, when D.C. sent him to the Tampa Bay Mutiny for Roy Lassiter on April 26, 1998. Lassiter was MLS's all-time leading goalscorer; Wegerle played the rest of the 1998 season for the Mutiny, scoring a single goal, then retired.

== International career ==
Wegerle gained his U.S. citizenship in 1991, after being eligible through his American wife. He made his national team debut on May 30, 1992, against the Republic of Ireland, and would go on to record 41 caps and score seven goals for his adopted country. On January 8, 1994, Wegerle injured his knee and underwent numerous arthroscopic surgeries, but he was able to recover in time to become a key player for the U.S. in the 1994 FIFA World Cup. By 1998, his repeated injuries had hobbled Wegerle. He enjoyed a brief resurgence leading up to the 1998 FIFA World Cup, but never became the key player he had been in 1994.

According to former U.S. national team coach Steve Sampson, Wegerle came to him and assistant coach Clive Charles between the February 25, 1998, game at Belgium and the March 14, 1998, match against Paraguay in San Diego and said he had personal knowledge of an affair between U.S. team captain John Harkes and Amy Wynalda, the wife of U.S. striker Eric Wynalda. As a result, Harkes was dropped from the team. The U.S. would go on to finish in last place at the 1998 FIFA World Cup.

=== International goals ===
#	Date	Venue	Opponent	Score	Result	Competition
1	June 3, 1992	Chicago, Illinois; Soldier Field	Portugal	1–0	1–0	1992 U.S. Cup
2	June 4, 1994	Pasadena, California; The Rose Bowl	Mexico	1–0	1–0	Friendly
3	June 18, 1995	Washington, D.C.; RFK Stadium	Mexico	1–0	4–0	1995 U.S. Cup
4	November 9, 1997	Vancouver, Canada; Swangard Stadium	Canada	2–0	3–0	1998 World Cup Qualifying
5	November 9, 1997	Vancouver, Canada; Swangard Stadium	Canada	3–0	3–0	1998 World Cup Qualifying
6	January 24, 1998	Orlando, Florida; Citrus Bowl	Sweden	1–0	1–0	Friendly
7	February 1, 1998	Oakland, California; Oakland Coliseum	Cuba	1–0	3–0	1998 Gold Cup

== Personal life ==
He is the younger brother of former NASL-ers Geoff Wegerle and Steve Wegerle. All three played for Tampa Bay at some point in their careers. His brother Steve's son Bryce was also a professional footballer.

== Golf career ==
Since his retirement, Wegerle has been trying to make it as a professional golfer.

== Media career ==
He had a brief stay as a co-host of MLS Extratime on ESPN2.

== Honors ==
Luton Town

- Football League Cup runner-up: 1988–89
