= Southern Suburbs =

Southern Suburbs may refer to:

- Southern Suburbs F.C., a South African association football team
- Southern Suburbs, Cape Town, a location in South Africa
