= Walter Silva (disambiguation) =

Walter Silva may refer to:

- Walter Silva (born 1977), Mexican baseball player
- Walter da Silva (1942–2009), Brazilian footballer
- Walter de Silva (born 1951), Italian car designer
- Wálter Machado da Silva (born 1940), Brazilian footballer
