= Geoff Wegerle =

South African soccer player

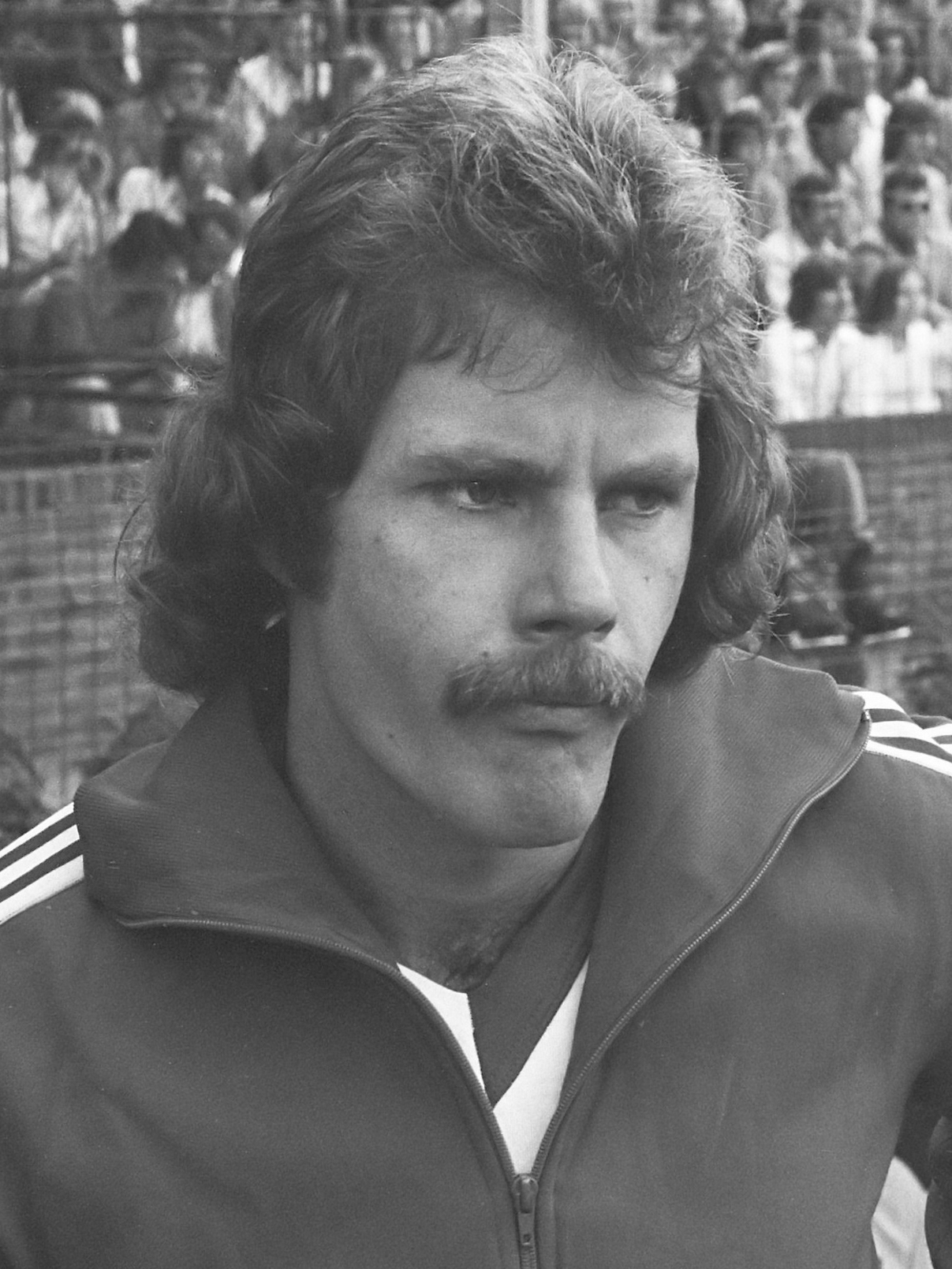
- Geoffrey Wegerle (1975)

Personal information
- Date of birth: 9 June 1954 (age 72)
- Place of birth: Pretoria, South Africa
- Positions: Forward; midfielder

Senior career*
Years	Team	Apps	(Gls)
1971–1975	Arcadia Shepherds		
1975–1976	Feyenoord	3	(1)
1976–1977	Arcadia Shepherds		
1978	Oakland Stompers	22	(1)
1979	Dion Highlands		
1979–1981	Arcadia Shepherds		
1982	Dion Highlands		
1983–1984	Toronto Blizzard	13	(2)
1986	Tampa Bay Rowdies (indoor)		
1987–1988	Tampa Bay Rowdies		
- * Club domestic league appearances and goals

Geoff Wegerle (born 9 June 1954) is a South African former football (soccer) forward who played professionally in Europe, South Africa and the North American Soccer League.

== Playing career ==
Wegerle scored 20 goals when his club Arcadia Shepherds won the South African treble in 1974. He played for Feyenoord in Rotterdam from 1975 to 1976, along with his brother Steve. They finished 2nd with Feyenoord in the Dutch competition in that 1975/1976 season, with 88 goals for and 40 goals against. In 1978, Wegerle played for the Oakland Stompers of the North American Soccer League. He returned to the league in 1983 for two seasons with the Toronto Blizzard. Wegerle played for the independent Tampa Bay Rowdies in 1986. In January 1987, he signed with the Rowdies as they were playing in the American Indoor Soccer Association. In December 1987, the Rowdies signed Wegerle for the upcoming American Soccer League season.

== Personal life ==
Both of his brothers, Steve and Roy, have also played for the Rowdies over the course of their careers. His brother Steve's son Bryce was also a professional footballer.
