= Sergio Dos Santos =

South African soccer player

Sergio dos Santos
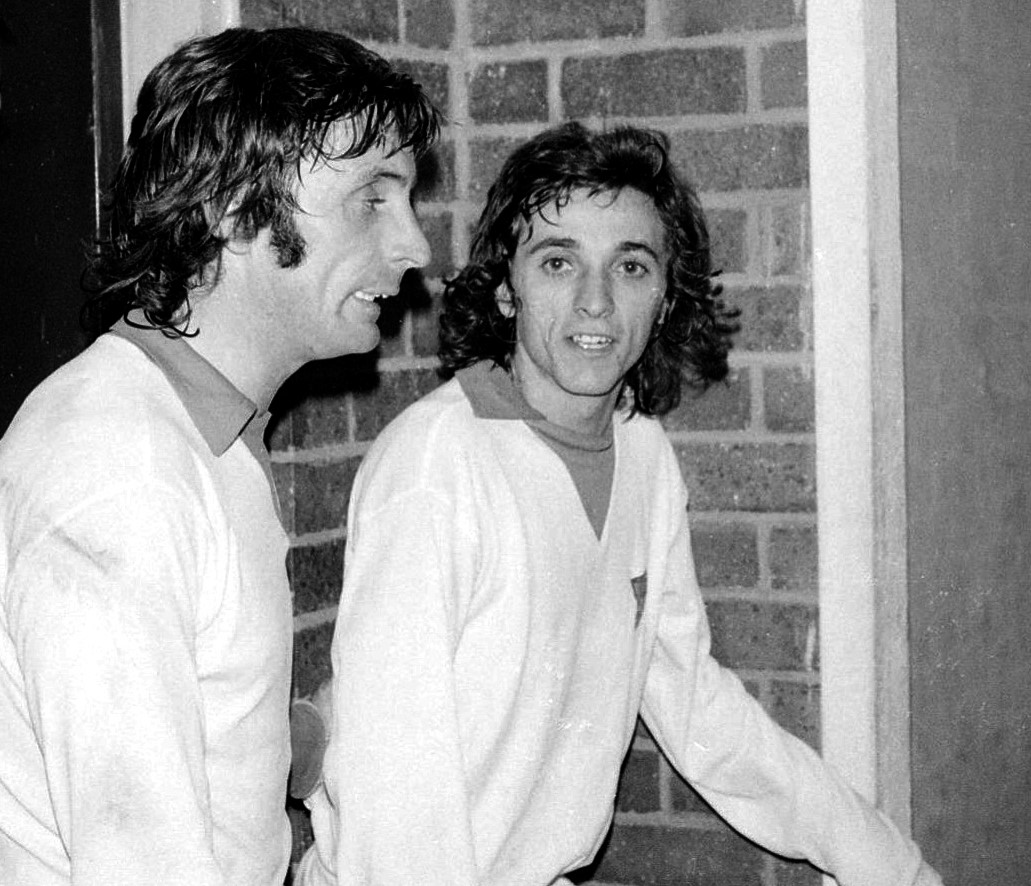
- Sergio dos Santos (right), Wally Gould (left) in 1972.

Personal information
- Full name: Sergio Lourenço dos Santos
- Date of birth: 25 October 1951 (age 75)
- Place of birth: Leiria, Portugal
- Position: Midfielder

Youth career
- Salesians
- Bothasig
- St. Agnes
- Camps Bay
- Avion Park

Senior career*
Years	Team	Apps	(Gls)
1968–1976	Hellenic		
- Cape Town Spurs
- Bloemfontein Celtic
- Benoni United
- Kaizer Chiefs
- Glenville
- * Club domestic league appearances and goals

Sergio dos Santos (born 1950) is a South African former soccer player who played as a midfielder for Hellenic, Cape Town Spurs and Kaizer Chiefs. He also managed Kaizer Chiefs for a spell in the mid-1990s.

== Early life ==
He was born to Portuguese immigrants. He went to school at Brebner High School and Bloemfontein Commercial High.

== Career ==
He joined the Greek Gods in 1968 and became their captain at the age of 22. He also went on to play for Cape Town Spurs and Kaizer Chiefs.

He has coached Engen Santos, Orlando Pirates, Hellenic, Cape Town Spurs, Ikapa Sporting and Kaizer Chiefs in 1993.

== Post-retirement ==
He has worked as a Customer Relations Manager at Metro Cash and Carry, an Operations Manager at his own retail clothing company, Choice Clothing, a Western Cape ambassador for the 2010 FIFA World Cup and currently a Managing Partner at Kwantu Solutions.

He also works as a pundit for E.tv for UEFA Champions League matches.
