= Eric Welsh (footballer) =

Northern Irish footballer

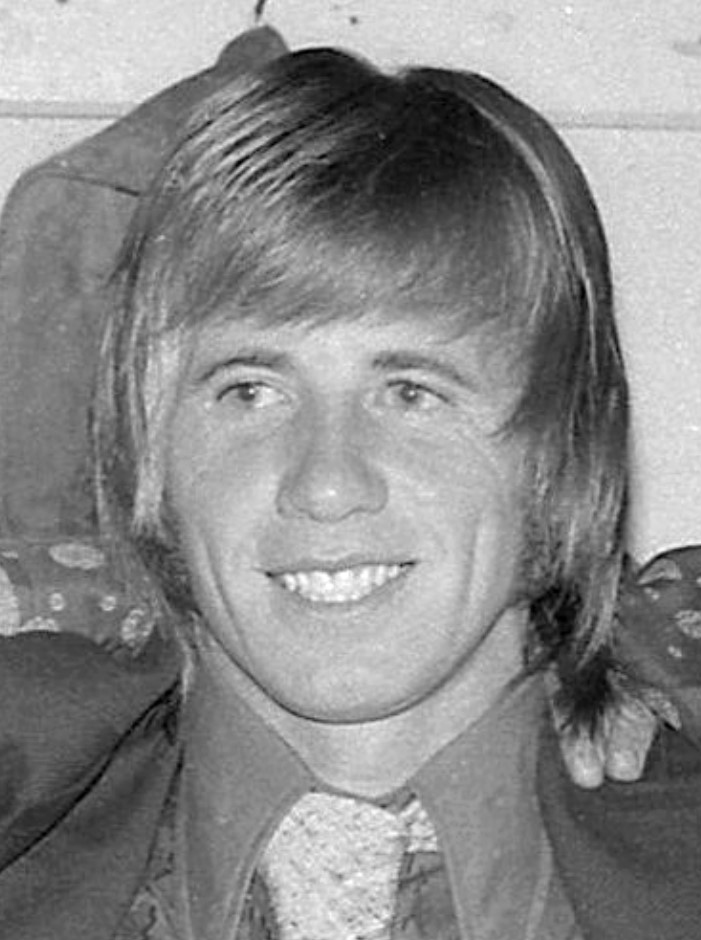
- Eric Welsh in 1973.

Personal information
- Date of birth: 1 May 1942 (age 84)
- Place of birth: Belfast, Northern Ireland
- Height: 5 ft 8 1/2 in (1.74 m)
- Position: Right winger

Youth career
- Boyland

Senior career*
Years	Team	Apps	(Gls)
1959–1965	Exeter City	105	(19)
1965–1969	Carlisle United	75	(17)
1969–1971	Torquay United	39	(11)
1971–1972	Hartlepool United	15	(2)
- Port Elizabeth City
- Salisbury
- Hellenic
1977–1978	Distillery		
Total		234	(49)

International career
1966–1967	Northern Ireland	4	(1)
- * Club domestic league appearances and goals

Eric Welsh (born 1 May 1942) is a Northern Irish former professional footballer who played as a right winger.

== Career ==
Born in Belfast, Welsh played for Boyland, Exeter City, Carlisle United, Torquay United, Hartlepool United, Port Elizabeth City, Salisbury, Hellenic and Distillery. He also earned four caps for the Northern Ireland national team.
