= Gary France =

English footballer

Garry France
Personal information
- Full name: Garry Lawton France
- Date of birth: 15 May 1946 (age 80)
- Place of birth: Stalybridge, England
- Position: Midfielder

Senior career*
Years	Team	Apps	(Gls)
1964–1966	Stalybridge Celtic		
1966–1968	Burnley	10	(1)
1968–1969	Bury	1	(0)
1969–1979	Cape Town City	275	(198)
- * Club domestic league appearances and goals

Garry Lawton France (born 15 May 1946) is an English retired footballer who played as a midfielder. He played professionally in the Football League with both Burnley and Bury.
