= Bryce Wegerle =

American footballer (born 1983)

Personal information
- Full name: Bryce Wegerle
- Date of birth: 1983 (age 42–43)
- Place of birth: United States
- Position: Forward

Youth career
- –2001: Gaither High School
- James Madison Dukes
- 2002–2003: Udinese

Senior career*
Years	Team	Apps	(Gls)
- Cocoa Expos
- * Club domestic league appearances and goals as of 17:00, 5 November 2022 (UTC)

Bryce Wegerle (born 1983) is an American former professional footballer who played as a forward.

== Club career ==
Wegerle attended Gaither High School and won the Gatorade Boys Soccer Player of the Year in 2000-01. He was part of the 2001 Mens soccer roster for the James Madison Dukes.

In 2002, he joined the youth academy of Italian side Udinese.

Wegerle had several trials in 2003. He appeared in a match for Swedish side Bodens BK in March. In May, he appeared as a trialist for American side San Jose Earthquakes. He played as a trialist for English side Charlton in July. Wegerle appeared as a trialist for German side Werder Bremen against VfR Neumünster in August. He trained with Scottish side Livingston in September but was not offered a contract.

By 2004, Wegerle had returned to the United States and was playing for the Cocoa Expos.

== After football ==
Wegerle competed as a professional golfer following his football career.

== Personal life ==
He is the son of former footballer Steve Wegerle, and the nephew of Roy Wegerle and Geoff Wegerle.
