= Hartleyvale Stadium =

Field hockey stadium in Observatory, Cape Town, South Africa

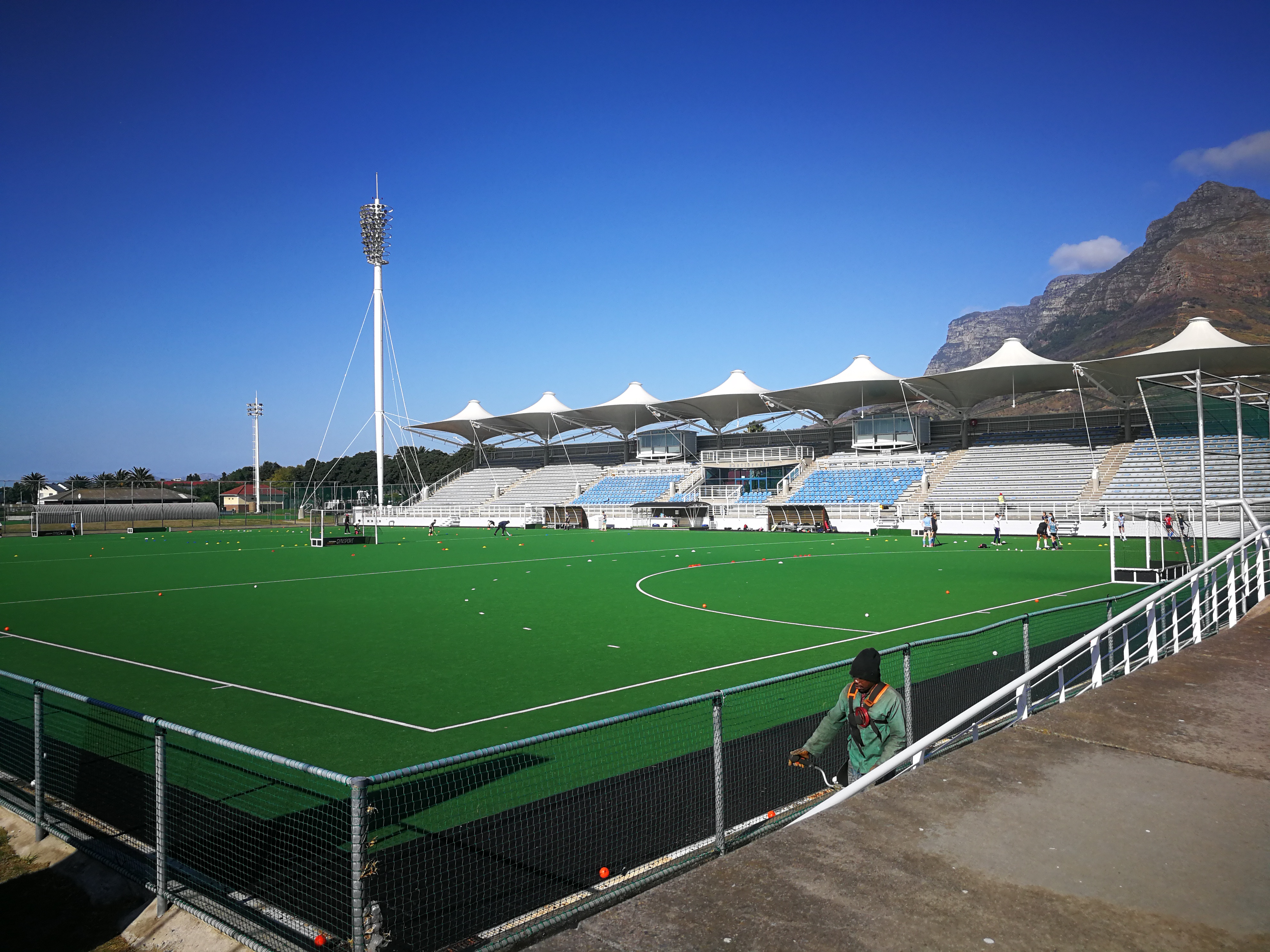
- Field hockey stadium
- Interactive map of Hartleyvale Stadium
- Location: Observatory, Cape Town, South Africa
- Coordinates: 33°56′20″S 18°28′35″E
- Capacity: Field hockey: 3,000
- Surface: Astroturf

Construction
- Architects: ACG Architect & Development Planners

Tenants
- Western Province Hockey Union; Cape Town City F.C. (training ground)

Hartleyvale Stadium is a field hockey stadium in Observatory, Cape Town, South Africa. It was previously used as a soccer stadium by Cape Town City in the National Football League era, as well as by Hellenic during the late 1980s. It is currently a field hockey stadium, with smaller fields nearby still used for soccer by local amateur club sides.

Hartleyvale's capacity was 2,000 people prior to 1996. In 1996 the Hartleyvale Stadium was upgraded at a cost of 20 million rand. The design was by ACG Architects in association with GAPP Architects as a regional and national sporting facility to boost South Africa's bid to host the 2004 Olympics. The complex was awarded the SAIA Award of Merit in 1996 and the SAIA Award of Excellence in 2008. From September 2024 to January 2025 the complex was upgraded and repaired for a cost of R43 million. Upgrades included new astroturf and repair of certain infrastructure. The facility is now run by the City of Cape Town and has two astroturf sports fields. The stadium is also used as a voting station for municipal and general elections.

Cape Town City F.C. uses it as a training centre, and it was the original club's home ground between 1962 and 1977.

== Major events ==
In 2022, the centre hosted the Masters Hockey World Cups and in 2024 it hosted the World Masters Hockey World Cups.
