= Ben Anderson (footballer) =

Scottish footballer (born 1946)

Personal information
- Full name: Benjamin Cummings Anderson
- Date of birth: 18 February 1946 (age 80)
- Place of birth: Aberdeen, Scotland
- Position: Central defender

Senior career*
Years	Team	Apps	(Gls)
1964–1968	Blackburn Rovers	28	(7)
1968–1970	Bury	53	(4)
1970–1973	Cape Town City		
1973–1974	Crystal Palace	11	(1)
1974–?	Cape Town City		
Total		92	(12)
- * Club domestic league appearances and goals

Benjamin Cummings Anderson (born 18 February 1946) is a Scottish footballer who played as a central defender. He played in the Football League for Blackburn Rovers, Bury and Crystal Palace, and had two spells with Cape Town City in South Africa's National Football League.

== Honours ==
Cape Town City

- UTC Bowl: 1971, 1973
