= 2024 Masters Hockey World Cup =

Tournament details
- Venue(s): Hartleyvale Stadium; NZ National Hockey Centre

The 2024 Masters Hockey World Cup is an upcoming field hockey event for World Masters Hockey. The event comprises a series of tournaments in both male and female competitions.

== Age Groups ==
Across both the men's and women's tournaments, a total five age groups are played:

=== 2024 World Cup Cape Town ===
12-21 October; Hartleyvale Stadium, Cape Town

Men

- Over 35's
- Over 40's
- Over 65's
- Over 70's
- Over 75's
- Over 80's

Women

- Over 35's
- Over 40's

=== 2024 World Cup Auckland ===
7 November - 16 November, NZ National Hockey Centre, Auckland

Men

- Over 45's
- Over 50's
- Over 55's
- Over 60's

Women

- Over 45's
- Over 50's
- Over 55's
- Over 60's
- Over 65's
- Over 70's

== Venues ==
Following is a list of all venues and host cities.

| 2024 Masters Hockey World Cup is located in Earth | Cape Town | Auckland |
|---|---|---|
| 2024 Masters Hockey World Cup is located in Earth | Hartleyvale Stadium | National Hockey Centre |
| 2024 Masters Hockey World Cup is located in Earth | Capacity: 3,000 | Capacity: |

== Results ==
=== Men's competitions ===
| Age group | Hosts | Gold Medal Match | | | Bronze Medal Match | | | IMC World Champions |
| Age group | Hosts | World Champions | Score | Runners-up | 3rd place | Score | 4th place | |
|---|---|---|---|---|---|---|---|---|
| Over 35 | Cape Town, South Africa | England | 4–3 | South Africa | Australia | 3–2 | New Zealand | South Africa |
| Over 40 | Cape Town, South Africa | South Africa | 3–1 | Australia | England | 6–3 | New Zealand | Australia |
| Over 45 | Auckland, New Zealand | Australia | 5–1 | South Africa | Netherlands | 3–1 | Argentina | Australia |
| Over 50 | Auckland, New Zealand | Germany | 4–3 | Australia | Argentina | 2–2 (3–0) penalty shootout | New Zealand | Australia |
| Over 55 | Auckland, New Zealand | England | 4–2 | Australia | New Zealand | 3–1 | South Africa | England LX |
| Over 60 | Auckland, New Zealand | England | 2–0 | Australia | France | 0–0 (2–1) penalty shootout | Wales | New Zealand IMC |
| Over 65 | Cape Town, South Africa | England | 2–2 (2–1 pen.) | Netherlands | Australia | 4–3 | Germany | Australia |
| Over 70 | Cape Town, South Africa | Germany | 4–1 | Australia | Netherlands | 3–1 | Wales | England LX |
| Over 75 | Cape Town, South Africa | England | 3–0 | Australia | Germany | 2–0 | South Africa | |

=== Women's competitions ===
| Age group | Hosts | Gold Medal Match | | | Bronze Medal Match | | | IMC World Champions |
| Age group | Hosts | World Champions | Score | Runners-up | 3rd place | Score | 4th place | |
|---|---|---|---|---|---|---|---|---|
| Over 35 | Cape Town, South Africa | South Africa | 4–1 | Netherlands | England | 4–3 | Australia | Australia |
| Over 40 | Cape Town, South Africa | Australia | 1–0 | Argentina | Chile | 2–1 | England | Australia |
| Over 45 | Auckland, New Zealand | | 2–1 | Argentina | England | 4–0 | New Zealand | Australia |
| Over 50 | Auckland, New Zealand | Argentina | 3–0 | New Zealand | Australia | 2–1 | Chile | NA |
| Over 55 | Auckland, New Zealand | England | 1–0 | Ireland | Netherlands | 1–0 | South Africa | Alliance |
| Over 60 | Auckland, New Zealand | England | 1–0 | Scotland | Australia | 3–0 | Netherlands | Australia |
| Over 65 | Auckland, New Zealand | England | 7–0 | Wales | Australia | 1–0 | Argentina | England LX |
| Over 70 | Auckland, New Zealand | Australia | 0–0 (4–3) penalty shootout | England | New Zealand | Round-robin | Alliance Blue IMC | England LX |
