= Addington F.C. =

South African football club

Addington FC
- Full name: Addington Football Club
- Ground: New Kingsmead stadium, Durban
Home colours	Away colours	Third colours

Addington FC was a South African football (soccer) club based in Durban. Addington won both the National Football League and the Castle Cup in 1963, and the NFL again in 1969 (as Durban Spurs).

== History ==
Addington FC was promoted into the National Football League of South Africa in 1962. At the time, the NFL was the professional league for white teams within South Africa's apartheid system. Addington won their first NFL championship the next season, in 1963. Before the 1969 season, they were renamed Durban Spurs, and went on to win the 1969 league. By the start of the 1970 season, they had merged with Durban United to form Durban Spurs United.

== See also ==
- National Football League (South Africa)
