= Nick Durandt =

South African boxing trainer and manager

Nick Durandt (26 December 1963 – 21 April 2017) was a South African boxing trainer and manager.

During his career, Durandt produced 95 South African champions in all 17 weight divisions, 38 world champions and 27 International champions through the WBC, WBA, IBF, WBO, WBF and IBO organizations. He was the son of Clifford Michael Durandt (16 April 1940 – 3 October 2002), a South African footballer who played in the English First Division for Wolverhampton Wanderers.

Durandt trained numerous fighters to world titles status, including Thulani "Sugarboy" Malinga, three times South African and three times world champion, Phillip Ndou, Cassius Baloyi, Silence Mabuza, Isaac Hlatshwayo, Jacob Mofokeng, Jeffrey Mathebula, Malcolm Klassen, Siphiwe Nonqayi, Hawk Makepula, Zolani Tete, and Moruti Mthalane.
