= Walter da Silva =

Brazilian footballer and manager

Personal information
- Full name: Walter Cesar Nogueira da Silva
- Date of birth: 12 January 1942
- Place of birth: Brazil
- Date of death: 21 May 2009 (aged 67)
- Place of death: South Africa
- Position: Striker

Senior career*
Years	Team	Apps	(Gls)
1964–1965	Hellenic	26	(18)
1966–1967	Highlands Park	46	(58)
1967–1970	Powerlines	?	(34)
1971	Highlands Park	7	(6)
1971–1972	Berea Park	?	(10)
Total		?	(162)

Managerial career
- –: Orlando Pirates
- –: Kaizer Chiefs
- –: Moroka Swallows
- Anse Reunion FC
- * Club domestic league appearances and goals

Walter Cesar Nogueira da Silva (12 January 1942 – 21 May 2009) was a Brazilian professional footballer who played as a striker. Active primarily in South Africa – scoring a total of 162 goals for Highlands Park, Powerlines, Hellenic and Berea Park – Da Silva was also a football manager, and had coached Orlando Pirates, Kaizer Chiefs and Moroka Swallows.

In November 1999, while managing Moroka Swallows, two supporters decided to kidnap da Silva and escaped with him, forcing the Brazilian to make a phone call to his assistants ahead of a game against Bush Bucks, asking them to leave the stadium.
