= NFL Cup =

(South Africa) Castle Cup
- Founded: 1959
- Abolished: 1977
- Most championships: Highlands Park F.C. (6 titles)

The NFL Cup (widely known as the Castle Cup due to its sponsorship from Castle Breweries) was the association football cup competition of the National Football League in South Africa under Apartheid. It was established in 1959 and disbanded in 1977. The competition was only eligible to teams made up of white players.

== Previous winners ==
Year	Winners	Runner-up
1959	Rangers	Germiston Callies
1960	Durban City	Johannesburg Ramblers
1961	Highlands Park	Durban City
1962	Durban City	Johannesburg Ramblers
1963	Addington	Southern Suburbs
1964	Durban City	Jewish Guild
1965	Highlands Park	Arcadia United
1966	Highlands Park	Arcadia United
1967	Highlands Park	Rangers
1968	Durban City	Highlands Park
1969	Maritzburg	Cape Town City
1970	Cape Town City	Highlands Park
1971	Cape Town City	Durban City
1972	Durban United	Durban City
1973	Highlands Park	Florida Albion
1974	Arcadia Shepherds	Highlands Park
1975	Highlands Park	Arcadia Shepherds
1976	Cape Town City	Hellenic
1977	Lusitano	Durban United
