= Jewish Guild =

- Full name: Jewish Guild
- Founded: 1897
Home colours	Away colours	Third colours

The Jewish Guild is a social and sporting club in suburban Johannesburg, South Africa, founded in the late 19th century. They once fielded a football side that was runner-up in the South African cup competition and fielded the player George Best.

== History ==
In 1960, the Old Arcs (founded 1897) asked Jewish Guild to run their football team. From then on the club – now renamed Jewish Guild – went from strength to strength, reaching the Castle Cup final in 1964 while still playing in the provincial league. When South Africa's National Football League voted to establish a national second division to start in 1969, Jewish Guild were among the 10 clubs admitted. The first season, they ended in fifth place. The following season, 1970, they ran away with the championship with a nine-point margin over runners-up Durban Celtic in the era of two points for a win. Thus Jewish Guild were promoted to the highest level of South African football in the days of apartheid in the whites-only league.

Their best season in the top division was 1975, when they placed sixth in a 15-team league. After that, the club merged with Johannesburg Corinthians to form Guild Apollo, which in turn played as Roodepoort Guild in 1977, the final NFL season, before finally closing. Today, the Jewish Guild is located in Linksfield, a suburb of Johannesburg and participates in lawn bowling competitions.

== Honours ==
- NFL Second Division League Champions 1970
- Castle Cup Runners-up 1964

== See also ==
- History of the Jews in South Africa
