= Boksburg F.C. =

- Founded: 1926
- League: National Football League

Boksburg F.C. is a South African football club. They competed in the National Football League.
