= Corinthians F.C. (Johannesburg) =

Corinthians F.C. was a South African football club based in Johannesburg which competed in the National Football League.
