= Port Elizabeth City F.C. =

South African soccer club

Port Elizabeth City F.C. was a South African football club, active in the 1960s and 1970s, which won the National Football League in 1967.
