= National Football League (South Africa) =

Professional football league of South Africa

- Founded: 1959
- Folded: 1977
- Country: South Africa
- Most championships: Highlands Park (8 titles)

The National Football League (NFL) was the first professional football league in South Africa, established in 1959. At first the NFL received stiff opposition from the SAFA, the amateur governing body which controlled the major football grounds in the county. The SAFA was a member of FIFA at the time.

Initially, only two areas of South Africa were represented - Transvaal and Durban - but gradually the league became more geographically representative. The teams that joined the league in 1959 were-Transvaal (9 teams)-Rangers, Germiston Callies, Arcadia Shepherds, Benoni United, Randfontein, Pretoria City, Brakpan United, Johannesburg City & Southern Park. Natal (3 teams)-Durban City, Durban United & Maritzburg Celtic. The League kicked-off on 4 July 1959 (only one round was played).

A promotion play-off for the Champions of the various State Leagues was introduced in 1962, and the league spread to Cape Town (1962), Bloemfontein (1963) and Port Elizabeth (1964). An NFL Division II was established in 1969, with the Champions promoted to Division I. The league was competitive during the apartheid era, and only white players were allowed to participate. However a few NFL teams traveled to neighboring countries to play friendlies.1961 Durban City beat a multi-racial Salisbury Combined XI 8-2 at the Glamis Stadium. An NFL XI lost to a Rhodesian XI 2-6, at the Raylton Sports ground. Germiston Callies played a non-white team, Black Pirates in Maseru, Lesotho. 25 February 1961.

However, black players did participate in the competition. The first to do so was Vincent Julius, he represented Arcadia Shepherds in 1976 versus Highlands Park. Highlands Park protested Julius' presence but the NFL allowed him to play. The South African Home Office took no action having been convinced by Arcadia Shepherds that the story would be told all around the world and cast the ruling party in a bad light.

When NFL folded after 18 years in 1977, it was superseded by a non-racial league. In practical terms, a merger happened between NFL (for whites) and NPSL (for blacks), to become the new common NPSL.

== Winners ==
Year	Winners	Runners-up	Third place
1959	Durban City (1)	Rangers Johannesburg	Durban United
1960	Highlands Park (1)	Durban City	Germiston Callies
1961	Durban City (2)	Highlands Park	Germiston Callies
1962	Highlands Park (2)	Southern Suburbs	Durban City
1963	Addington (1)	Highlands Park	Durban City
1964	Highlands Park (3)	Durban City	Durban United
1965	Highlands Park (4)	Cape Town City	Durban City
1966	Highlands Park (5)	Port Elizabeth City	Durban United
1967	Port Elizabeth City (1)	Highlands Park	Cape Town City
1968	Highlands Park (6)	Durban United	Powerlines
1969	Durban Spurs (2*)	Powerlines	Highlands Park
1970	Durban City (3)	Cape Town City	Maritzburg
1971	Hellenic (1)	Cape Town City	Durban City
1972	Durban City (4)	Hellenic	Berea Park
1973	Cape Town City (1)	Highlands Park	Hellenic
1974	Arcadia Shepherds (1)	Cape Town City	Maritzburg
1975	Highlands Park (7)	Hellenic	Maritzburg
1976	Cape Town City (2)	Highlands Park	Wits University
1977	Highlands Park (8)	Lusitano	Durban United

- Note that Addington were known as Durban Spurs when they won their second championship.

Team	Titles	Years
Highlands Park	8	1960, 1962, 1964, 1965, 1966, 1968, 1975, 1977
Durban City	4	1959, 1961, 1970, 1972
Durban Spurs	2	1963, 1969
Cape Town City	2	1973, 1976
Port Elizabeth City	1	1967
Hellenic	1	1971
Arcadia Shepherds	1	1974

== Individual honours ==
Year	Player of the Year	Footballer of the Year	Foreign Player of the Year	Top Scorer
1959	Rocco Smith (Benoni United)	N/A	N/A	Les Salton (Durban City) 21
1960	Malcolm Rufus (Durban City)	N/A	N/A	Pip Hughes (Highlands Park) 37
1961	Les Salton (Durban City)	N/A	N/A	Les Salton (Durban City) 46
1962	George Barratt (Durban City)	N/A	N/A	Peter McEwan (Germiston Callies) 36
1963	Ken Denysschen (Durban City)	N/A	N/A	Bazil Johnson (Arcadia United) 43
1964	(Rhodesia) Bobby Chalmers (Durban City)	N/A	N/A	Les Salton (Durban United) 42
1965	Malcolm Rufus (Highlands Park)	N/A	N/A	Arne Bjørnstad (Boksburg) & Freddie Kalk (Highlands Park) 33
1966	Freddie Kalk (Highlands Park)	Robin Lowe (Durban United)	(Scotland) Willie McIntosh (Highlands Park)	(Brazil) Walter da Silva (Highlands Park) 44
1967	Bob Davies (Rangers)	Charlie Naude (Germiston Callies)	(Wales) Bryan Orritt (Southern Suburbs)	(England) Jim Scott (Durban City) 28
1968	Henry Hauser (Addington)	Derek Smethurst (Durban City)	(Austria) Peter Rath (Powerlines)	Stan Forster (Rangers) 32
1969	Richard Allen (Cape Town City)	Frank Pereira (Powerlines)	(England) Gary France (Cape Town City)	(Brazil) Walter da Silva (Powerlines) 21
1970	Archie Soekoe (Rangers)	Bennie Booysen (Southern Suburbs)	(Gibraltar) (England) Tony Macedo (Durban City)	(England) Jim Scott (Durban City) 31
1971	(England) George Eastham (Hellenic)	Ronnie Mann (Durban City)	(Scotland) Ben Anderson (Cape Town City)	(England) Jim Scott (Durban City-16/Durban United-6) 22
1972	Trevor Gething (Berea Park)	Wilf de Bruin (Hellenic)	(England) Johnny Haynes (Durban City)	Wilf de Bruin (Hellenic) 26
1973	Ian Bender (Durban Celtic)	Hennie Joubert (Highlands Park)	(England) Peter Withe (Arcadia Shepherds)	Wilf de Bruin (Hellenic) 24
1974	Steve Wegerle (Arcadia Shepherds)	Steve Wegerle (Arcadia Shepherds)	(Jersey) Dave Huson (Hellenic)	Ian Bender (Durban Celtic) 17
1975				Gary France (Cape Town City) 20
1976				Chris Chilton (Highlands Park) 19
1977		Ian Bender (Maritzburg)		Tony Stathakis (Highlands Park) 28

== Leading Aggregate Goalscorers ==
Total	Player	Clubs	Seasons
253	Les Salton	Durban City (109); Durban United (144)	1959-66
205	(Rhodesia) Bobby Chalmers	Durban City (106); Durban United (50); Maritzburg (49)	1962-74
196	Freddie Kalk	Southern Suburbs (64); Highlands Park (132)	1960-73
192	Wilf De Bruin	Hellenic FC (192)	1970-1983
184	Arne Bjørnstad	Boksburg (143); Southern Suburbs (41)	1960-70
157	(England) Jim Scott	Durban City (129); Durban United (22); Johannesburg Corinthians (5); Maritzburg (1)	1966-74
154	(Rhodesia) Vernon Wentzel	Durban City (46); Addington (108)	1962-68
153	Percy Owen	Rangers Johannesburg	1960-68
142	(Brazil) Walter da Silva	Hellenic (18); Highlands Park (64); Powerlines (50); Berea Park (10)	1964-72
136	Ronnie Mann	Durban United (87); Durban City (41); Guild Apollo (8)	1962-77
132	Danny Le Roux	Durban City (58); Durban United (71); Addington (3)	1959-67

== List of NFL Clubs (1959–1977) ==
Club	Location	Seasons	Name changes, mergers etc.
Addington	Durban	1962-68=	(=Durban Spurs)
Arcadia Shepherds	Pretoria	1959-62; =69-77	Merged with ISCOR Pretoria (=Arcadia United=)
ARCADIA UNITED	Pretoria	1963-68=	Merger of Arcadia Shepherds and ISCOR Pretoria (=Arcadia Shepherds)
BENONI UNITED	East Rand	1959-63	Merged with Brakpan United and Springs (Transvaal Lge.) (=East Rand United)
Berea Park	Pretoria	1960-64; 70-76	Merged with Pretoria City
BLOEMFONTEIN CITY	Bloemfontein	1963-66; 69-71	
Boksburg	East Rand	1960-67; 74	
BRAKPAN UNITED	East Rand	1959-63	Merged with Benoni United and Springs (Transvaal Lge.) (=East Rand United)
Cape Town City	Cape Town	1962-77	
DURBAN CELTIC	Durban	1972-74=	(=Pinetown Celtic)
Durban City F.C.	Durban	1959-77	
DURBAN RAMBLERS	Durban	1963	
DURBAN SPURS	Durban	=1969	(Addington=) Merged with Durban United (=Durban Spurs United)
DURBAN SPURS UNITED	Durban	1970=	Merger of Durban Spurs and Durban United (=Durban United)
Durban United	Durban	1959-69; =71-77	Merged with Durban Spurs (=Durban Spurs United=)
EAST LONDON CELTIC	East London	1969-70	Merged with East London City (Cape Eastern Lge.) (=East London United)
East London United	East London	1971-77	Merger of East London Celtic and East London City (Cape Eastern Lge.)
EAST RAND UNITED	East Rand	1964; 66	Merger of Benoni United, Brakpan United and Springs O.B. (Transvaal Lge.). Played on in the Transvaal Lge. as East Rand United, before resurfacing as Benoni United in NFL's new Division Two.
Germiston Callies	East Rand	1959-77	
GUILD APOLLO	West Rand	1976=	Merger of Jewish Guild and Johannesburg Corinthians (=Roodepoort Guild)
Hellenic	Cape Town	1964-77	
Highlands Park	Johannesburg	1960-70; =73-77	Merged with Powerlines (=Highlands Power=)
HIGHLANDS POWER	Johannesburg	1971-72=	Merger of Highlands Park and Powerlines (=Highlands Park)
ISCOR PRETORIA	Pretoria	1961-62	Merged with Arcadia Shepherds (=Arcadia United)
Jewish Guild	West Rand	1971-75	Merged with Johannesburg Corinthians (=Guild Apollo)
JOHANNESBURG CITY	Johannesburg	=1960-61	(Northern United=) Played on in the Transvaal Lge. until 1964, then merging with Marist Brothers AFC
Johannesburg Corinthians	Johannesburg	1967-69	Played on in the NFL's new Division Two until merging with Jewish Guild (=Guild Apollo)
JOHANNESBURG RAMBLERS	Johannesburg	1960-62	Merged with Rangers Johannesburg
JOHANNESBURG WANDERERS	Johannesburg	1962-65	Played in provincial competitions as Johannesburg Wanderers, before returning to the national scene as Southern Albion in NFL's new Division Two.
Lusitano	Johannesburg	1973-77	
MARIST BROTHERS AFC	Johannesburg	1960-65	Merged with Johannesburg City
Maritzburg	Pietermaritzburg	1968-77	Played in the Natal Lge. as Durban Municipals 1953-67
MARITZBURG CELTIC	Pietermaritzburg	1959	
NORTHERN UNITED	Johannesburg	1959=	(=Johannesburg City)
OLYMPIA	East Rand	1965-67	
PINETOWN CELTIC	Durban	=1975	(Durban Celtic=)
Port Elizabeth City	Port Elizabeth	1964-73	
Powerlines	East Rand	1968-70	Merged with Highlands Park (=Highlands Power)
PRETORIA CITY	Pretoria	1959	Merged with Berea Park (Transvaal Lge.)
RANDFONTEIN	West Rand	1959-61=	(=West Rand United)
Rangers Johannesburg	Johannesburg	1959-77	Merged with Johannesburg Ramblers
ROODEPOORT GUILD	West Rand	=1977	(Guild Apollo=)
SHAMROCKS	Pietermaritzburg	1975-76	
SOUTHERN PARK	Johannesburg	1959-60=	(=Southern Suburbs)
Southern Suburbs	Johannesburg	=1961-72	(Southern Park=)
WEST RAND UNITED	West Rand	=1962-63	(Randfontein=) Played on in the Transvaal Lge. as West Rand United, then Florida
WESTVIEW APOLLON	Port Elizabeth	1966-67	
Wits University	Johannesburg	1976-77	

== List of 2nd Level Clubs (1969–1975) ==
Club	Location	Seasons (NFL2)	Notes etc.
BENONI UNITED	East Rand	1970	Former NFL team; withdrew after one season
BEREA PARK	Pretoria	1969	Former NFL team; returned to the top level as first Champions of NFL's Division Two
BLOEMFONTEIN RANGERS	Bloemfontein	1972-73	Relegated
BOKSBURG	East Rand	1970-73; 1975	Former NFL team; returned briefly to the top level
DURBAN CELTIC	Durban	=1970-71	(Escombe=) Promoted
ESCOMBE	Durban	1969=	(=Durban Celtic)
FLORIDA ALBION	West Rand	=1970-75	Merger of Florida (Transvaal Lge.) and Southern Albion, both clubs were renamed former NFL teams (West Rand United and Johannesburg Wanderers, respectively).
GERMISTON PRIMROSE CITY	East Rand	1971-73	Relegated
HARMONY	Free State	1970-71; 74-75	
HIBS-AUSONIA	Cape Town	1969	Withdrew after a single season despite finishing as Runners-up
JEWISH GUILD	West Rand	1969-70	Promoted
JOHANNESBURG CORINTHIANS	Johannesburg	1970-75	First team to be relegated to NFL's new Division Two. Merged with Jewish Guild (=Guild Apollo)
KIMBERLEY ATHLETIC	Free State	1969-70	Relegated
KOEDOE PARK	West Rand	1971-72; 1974	Relegated twice
LUSITANO	Johannesburg	1971-72	Promoted
MARIST BROTHERS AFC	Johannesburg	1972	Former NFL team; finished last in their only season in Division Two
OLYMPIA	East Rand	1973-75	Former NFL team
PARTHENON	East Rand	1969-75	
PORT ELIZABETH CITY	Port Elizabeth	1974-75	Former NFL Champions
SHAMROCKS	Pietermaritzburg	1972-74	Promoted
SK WINDHOEK CITY	Windhoek, South-West Africa	=1974-75	Merger of SK Windhoek (SWA Lge.) and Windhoek City
SOUTHERN ALBION	Johannesburg	1969=	Had played in the NFL as Johannesburg Wanderers. Merged with Florida (=Florida Albion)
SOUTHERN SUBURBS	Johannesburg	1973-75	Former NSL Runners-up
VAAL UNITED	West Rand	1970-71; 73-75	
VIKTORIA 89	East Rand	1969-75	Had played in the Transvaal Lge. as Sparta Viktoria
WINDHOEK CITY	Windhoek, South-West Africa	1970-73=	Merged with local club SK Windhoek (=SK Windhoek City)
WINDHOEK RAMBLERS	Windhoek, South-West Africa	1969	Withdrew after one season
WITS UNIVERSITY	Johannesburg	1969-75	Last team to win promotion from NFL's Division Two

== Overseas teams that toured ==
1961. Leicester City, 1961 F.A.Cup finalists played Durban City on 27 May 1961, at Kingsmead. This was the first time that two professional teams from England and South Africa had played against one another. Leicester City won 2-0. Leicester City drew with Combined Transvaal 1-1, at the Rand Stadium.

1963. Tottenham Hotspur played three games in South Africa. 1st. 5 June 1963. V N.F.L XI @ Stamford Stadium, Durban. Won 5-2. 2nd. 8 June 1963 N.F.L XI @ Hartleyvale, Cape Town. Won 5-1. 3rd. 3 June 1963. V South Africa XI @ Rand Stadium. Won 3-1. The Spurs squad included Danny Blanchflower, Jimmy Greaves, Bobby Smith, Maurice Norman, Len White & Tony Marchi.

1963. Dundee United played three games in July 1963. V Transvaal, won 2-1. V Western Province, Hartleyvale.2 July. Lost 1-2. V Natal. Won 4-2.

1964. Arsenal played five games in May 1964. V Transvaal, Orange Free State won 2-0. 14th. V Natal. Durban Stadium. won 8-2. 17th. V Western Province. Won 5-1. V Eastern Province. Won 6-0. 22nd. V South Africa XI. won 5-0.

1964. Club Atletico Cerro (Uruguay). 14 July 1963. V Durban City. New Kingsmead.C.A.Cerro won 2-0. C.A.Cerro also played Western Province-17 July 1964 & South Africa XI, Rand Stadium. 20 July 1964.

1964. Real Madrid played three games in South Africa. 8 September 1964 V Castle Knights, Rand Stadium, winning 5-2. A N.F.L XI in Durban plus Western Province @ Hartleyvale, which Real Madrid won 4-0. The Real Madrid squad included Ferenc Puskas, Santamaria @ Gento. At this stage Real Madrid had won the European Cup on five consecutive occasions-1956, 1957, 1958, 1959 & 1960.

1964. Eintracht Frankfurt (Germany) played Addington, Highlands Park, Rand Stadium.

== See also ==
- NFL Cup (association football)
