= Southern Suburbs F.C. =

Southern Suburbs F.C. was a South African football club. Founded as Southern Park F.C., they competed in the National Football League.
