= Highlands Park F.C. (1959) =

- Full name: Highlands Park Football Club
- Nickname: The Lions of the North
- Founded: November 1959
- Dissolved: February 1983 (bought by the Jomo Cosmos)
- Ground: Balfour Park Stadium, Highlands North, Johannesburg
- Capacity: 13,500
- League: National Premier Soccer League
- 1982 season: 4th
Home colours

Highlands Park Football Club was a professional association football club in Johannesburg, South Africa, that existed from November 1959 to February 1983.

== History ==
The Balfour Park Sports club was founded by the Jewish Norman Lourie. During the years, the club facilitated amateur teams within the sports disciplines lawn bowling, cricket, and football. The club was located at Balfour Park in Highlands North, which is one of the northern suburbs of Johannesburg. In 1935, Lucke Matus (also known as Louis Matus) became a Foundation Member of Balfour Park, and when he ended his playing career as a footballer, he became the chairman of "Balfour Park football section" from 1937 until 1951, and also worked as a member of the Southern Transvaal Football Association Executive Committee from 1947 until 1959. Despite only being involved with amateur football in his previous career, he had the vision to found Highlands Park FC, as a new professional football club in November 1959. The new professional club would coexist and share the same facilities, with the amateur side of the club, known as "Balfour Park Sports club".

In 1971, Highlands Park F.C. merged with Powerlines F.C. from Nigel – a city located 61 km southeast of Highlands North in Johannesburg, and also playing in the top flight National Football League. But after playing only two seasons with the name Highlands Power F.C. in 1971–72, the club decided to change back its name to the more well-known Highlands Park F.C. in 1973. Ahead of the 1979 season, the club signed a five-year sponsor deal with Dion, which soon revamped the club. Beside of changing the players outfit to orange, the club also made an effort to maximise publicity of their new sponsor, by renaming the club to Dion Highlands F.C. in 1979. As the media however continued referring to the club simply as "Highlands", the club made the radical decision in February 1980, to skip the long lasting historical part of their name, with the official name being changed to Dion F.C.. Apparently this change however only lasted for a very short while in 1980, as the newspapers continued referring to the club as "Dion Highlands F.C.", in the subsequent years from 1981 to February 1983.

The club played its last official professional match at 12 February 1983, where the club lost the final of the special NPSL cup competition known as BP Top Eight Cup, with the score 0–2 to Orlando Pirates. Ahead of the 1983-season, the club's league franchise for NPSL, was purchased by South African international football player Jomo Sono. The professional remainder of the club was continued under the new club name Dion Cosmos, which ahead of the 1984-season was renamed to Jomo Cosmos.

== Stadium ==
In November 1959, at the same time when the Balfour Park amateur club decided to create the professional club Highlands Park FC, the club also started to construct Balfour Park Stadium. The first home match for the team in 1960 was however played at the nearby Rand Stadium, located 12 km south of Balfour Park Stadium, presumably because the club's new stadium was not yet finished. In subsequent years, the club normally played all their home matches at Balfour Park Stadium, except for some of the bigger international club matches, which they instead opted to play at the nearby Rand Stadium, with a higher capacity. The record home attendance at Balfour Park Stadium was set at the match against Durban City in 1963, when 13,500 spectators watched a 3–0 victory for Highlands.

== Honours ==
- National Football League
  - Champions (8): 1960, 1962, 1964, 1965, 1966, 1968, 1975, 1977–78
  - Runners-up (5): 1961, 1963, 1967, 1973, 1976
- National Professional Soccer League
  - Champions: 1980
- NFL Cup
  - Winners (6): 1961, 1965, 1966, 1967, 1973, 1975
  - Runners-up: 1969
