= Maritzburg F.C. =

Maritzburg
- Full name: Maritzburg Football Club
- Founded: 1953 (as Durban Municipals)
- Ground: Jan Smuts Stadium, Pietermaritzburg
Home colours

Maritzburg FC is a South African football (soccer) club based in Pietermaritzburg.

== History ==
Durban Municipals (founded 1953) had been a leading club in Natal for some time when the 1967 season got underway. They had come agonizingly close to promotion twice before. First, qualifying for the 1963 promotion play-offs only to miss promotion by a single point vis-a-vis Hellenic, and again in 1966, losing the southern play-off final against Westview Apollon from Port Elizabeth. The club (still known as Durban Municipals) would be playing their home games in neighbouring Pietermaritzburg to avoid competition for support with the three Durban teams in the top division. (Pietermaritzburg, on the other hand, had been without a professional soccer team since Maritzburg Celtic found themselves hopelessly out of their depth in NFL's inaugural season in 1959, folding after an abysmal run in which they failed to win a single game.) The 1967 season unfolded very much like the previous year's. The Municipals won the provincial league again, ahead of Escombe, to qualify for the Southern section of the play-offs. There they recorded three wins and one draw against East London Celtic and Peninsula FC of Cape Town, earning the right to a two-legged showdown with the 13th placed team in the NFL. Their opponents? None other than last season's nemesis, Westview Apollon. The Municipals lost 4–6 on aggregate, despite a first-leg hat-trick from future star defender Mike James. However, in a final twist, Westview Apollon withdrew from the NFL, and so Durban Municipals were promoted anyway. Attendance figures following the move to Pietermaritzburg had been encouraging, and it was decided to rename the club accordingly. They took the field in the NFL in 1968 as Maritzburg F.C.. In 1969, only their second season in the top flight, they won the Castle Cup. Maritzburg defeated favourites Cape Town City 2–1 with goals from Bobby Chalmers and Peter Greene. This was the first final to go to extra time. Their most successful league campaigns were 1970, 1974 and 1975, all ending with a third-place finish.

== See also ==
- National Football League (South Africa)
