= Rangers F.C. (South Africa) =

South African football club

Rangers
- Full name: Rangers Football Club
- Founded: 1889
- Ground: Rand Stadium, Johannesburg
- Capacity: 25000
Home colours

Rangers FC was a South African football (soccer) club based in Johannesburg. Rangers FC won the Castle Cup in 1959 and played the final in 1967. They also won the Floodlight Bowl in 1964 and the UTC Bowl in 1966. Their best season in the National Football League was the inaugural season in 1959, when they finished Runners-up to Durban City. The club merged with Johannesburg Ramblers for the 1963 season.

Some successful players of Rangers Football Club, which was a semi-professional soccer team in the 1960s to late 1980s include amongst others Ronnie Koekemoor, Archie Soekoe, Hilton Grainger, Percy Owen, Des Bakos, Brian Mason, Roy Jones, Bobby Viljoen, Mike Connell (who also later played for Tampa Bay Rowdies in the USA), Booby Arber, Henry Hill, Gerry Farrel, Mike Hugo, Dennis Snoyman and Russell Cruickshank. Notable youth team players included Keith Viljoen, Ivor Viljoen, Angelo Nicolaides, Billy Harrison, Kevin Hunter, George Peters, Greg Daubern and Douglas Walls in the 1970s to 1980s.

Some players such as Angelo Nicolaides also later played for the Portuguese Club Lusitano that shared the Rand Stadium as a home ground in Johannesburg, and for Jewish Guild, based at Balfour Park stadium.

Julie Kaplan was a midfielder for Jewish Guild and played alongside the football giant Mordechai Spiegler. He was one of Israel’s most famous footballers, often considered a national sporting icon. There were also other First Division clubs with players such as Hellenic from Cape Town, which had Ian St. John and George Eastham. Durban City had Johnny Haynes. Hellenic versus Cape Town City featured Hellenic's international German stars Arno Steffenhagen, Volkmaar Gross, and Bernd Patzke. They played against the great Gary France, Geoff Hurst, Donald Gie and Ian Towers.

One of the coaches the Rangers have had was Alex Forbes. In his playing career he played for Sheffield United and also Arsenal in the late 1940s and he was also the Arsenal youth team coach in England for a period of time. Forbes then went on to coach Orlando Pirates in 1975 and later other local teams like Highlands Park, Western Tigers and Swaraj.

Mike Connell was considered to be a world class midfielder, best known for creating openings for other to score many goals at Rangers and in Tampa Bay, USA.

Angelo Nicolaides was a strategist, and when playing for the Portuguese club Lusitano, he guided his side to goals through his midfield play and distribution of pinpoint passes to the strikers. Hilton Grainger, Des Bakos and Bobby Viljoen.

Then there was Colin Viljoen, who went on to play for Ipswich. Durban City had team people such as, George Wootten, Tony Macedo, Derek Cowden, Jim Scott, Johnny Haynes, and Budgie Byrne.

In 1985, the National Soccer League (NSL) was formed as a non-racial, nationwide league, uniting clubs from different racial backgrounds.This NSL later evolved into the Premier Soccer League (PSL) in 1996, which is now the top-flight professional league in South Africa. So, the “white football league” didn't survive as a separate entity—it was effectively absorbed into the unified, non-racial football system after apartheid.
