= Cape Town City F.C. (1960) =

South African football club

Cape Town City
- Full name: Cape Town City Football Club
- Founded: 1960
- Dissolved: 1979
- Ground: Hartleyvale Stadium, Observatory, Cape Town
- Chairman: Ian Taylor
- Manager: Reg Smith, Frank Lord, Roy Bailey
Home colours

Cape Town City Football Club was a football club based in Cape Town, South Africa. The club competed in the National Football League (NFL) from 1962 until the league was dissolved in 1977. Cape Town City won the NFL title in 1973 and 1976, as well as the NFL Cup in 1970, 1971 and 1976. Home matches were played at Hartleyvale Stadium in Observatory.

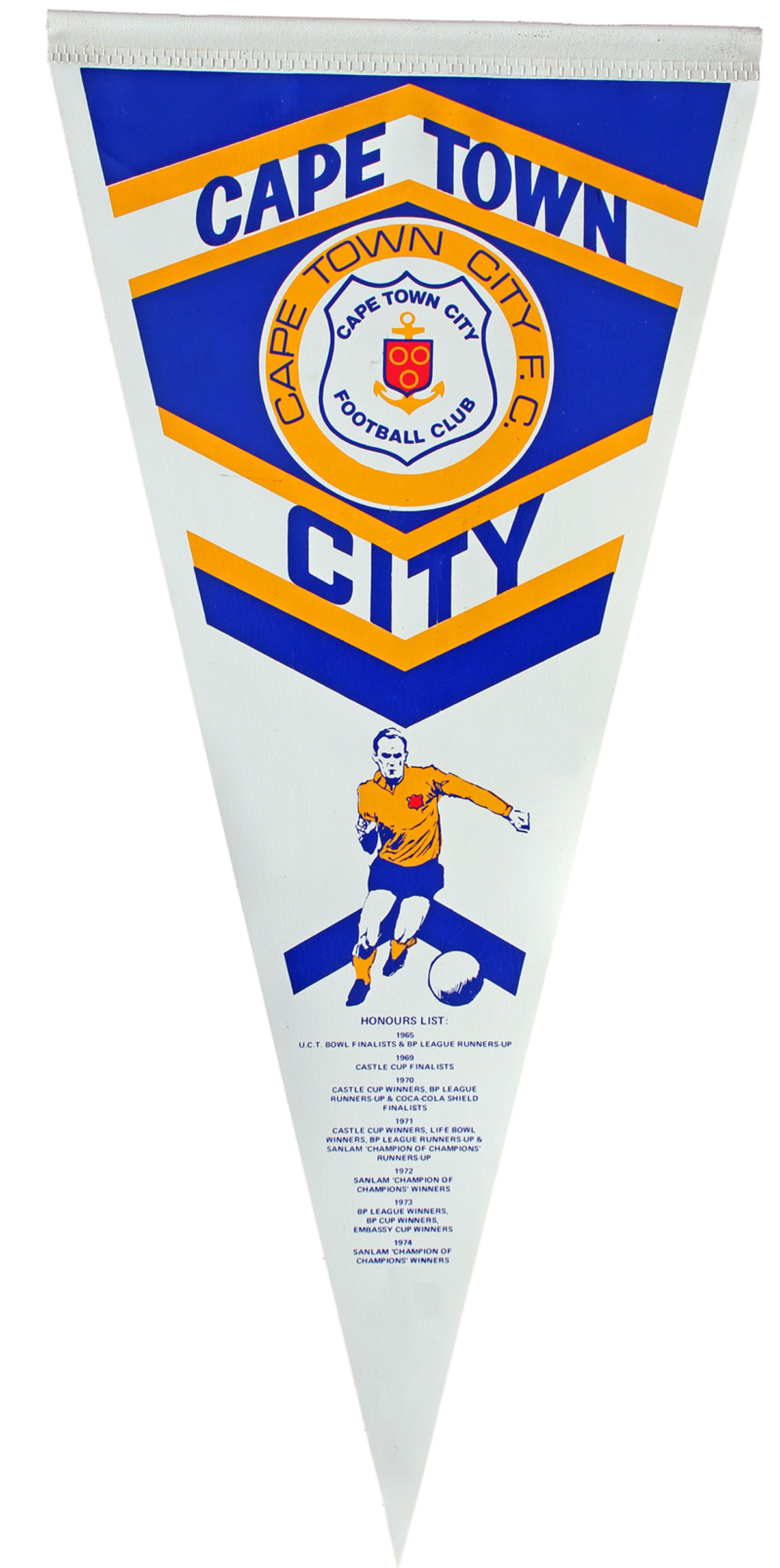
Cape Town City Penant with Honours

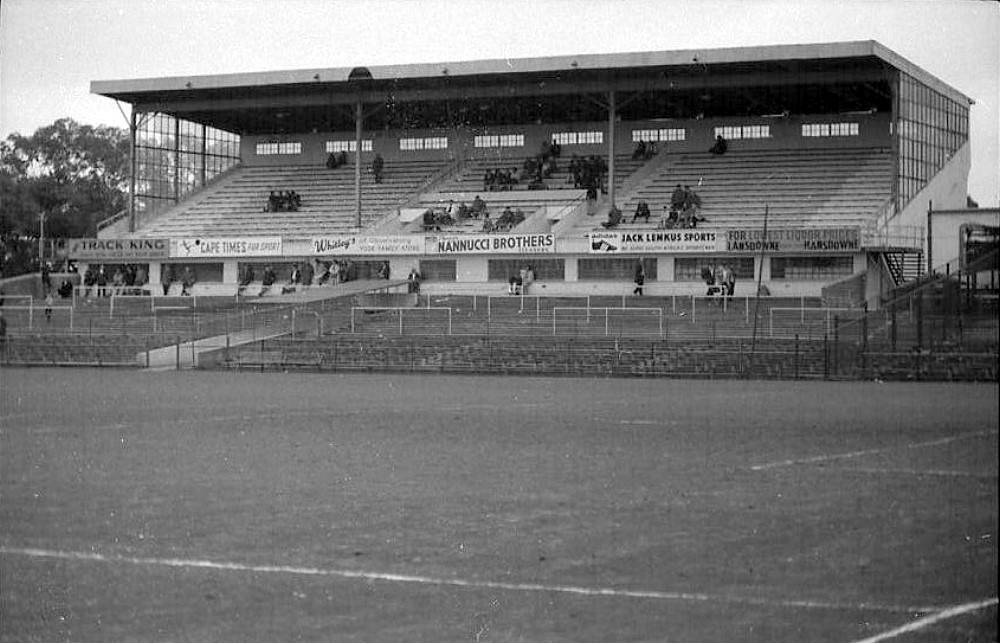
The Grandstand, Hartleyvale Stadium, 1972

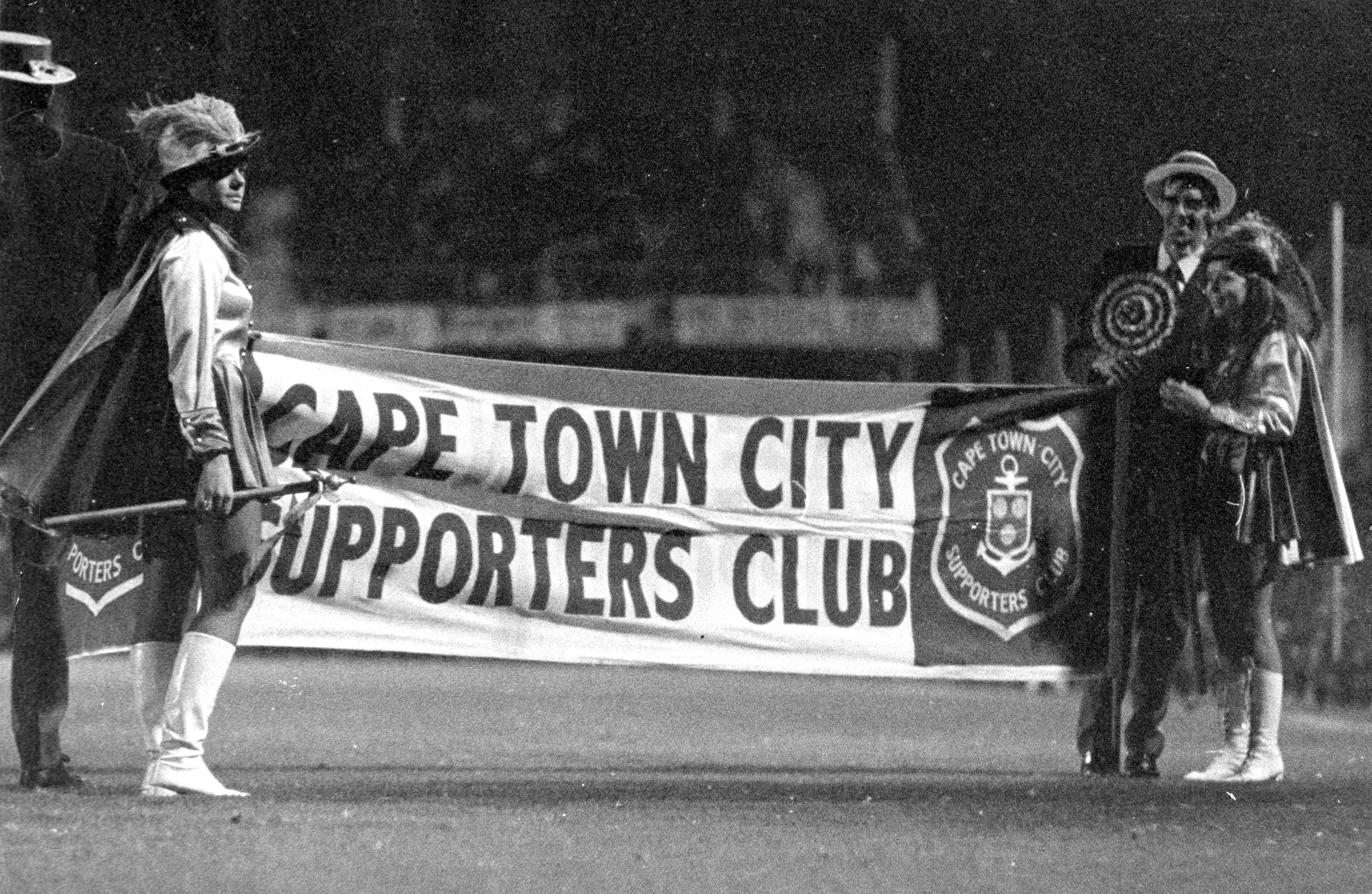
The Supporters' Club welcome at all home matches

In 1979, the club refused to play in the Mainstay Cup, withdrew from the 1980 season, and was put into liquidation.

== Honours ==
- NFL Champions: 1973, 1976 (Runners-up 1965, 1970, 1971, 1974, 1976)
- Castle Cup (NFL Cup) Winners: 1970, 1971, 1976 (Runners-up 1969)
- UTC Bowl Winners: 1971, 1973 (Runners-up 1965)
- Champion of Champions Winners: 1971, 1972, 1974
- Coca-Cola Shield: (Runners-up 1970, 1975)

== Gallery ==
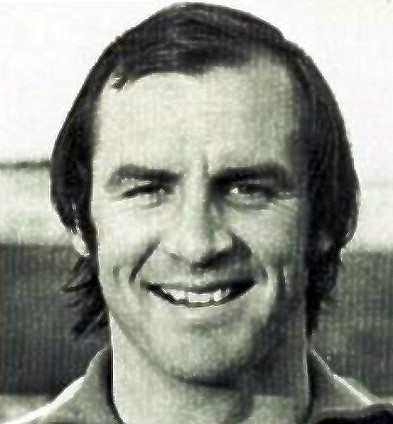
Ben Anderson

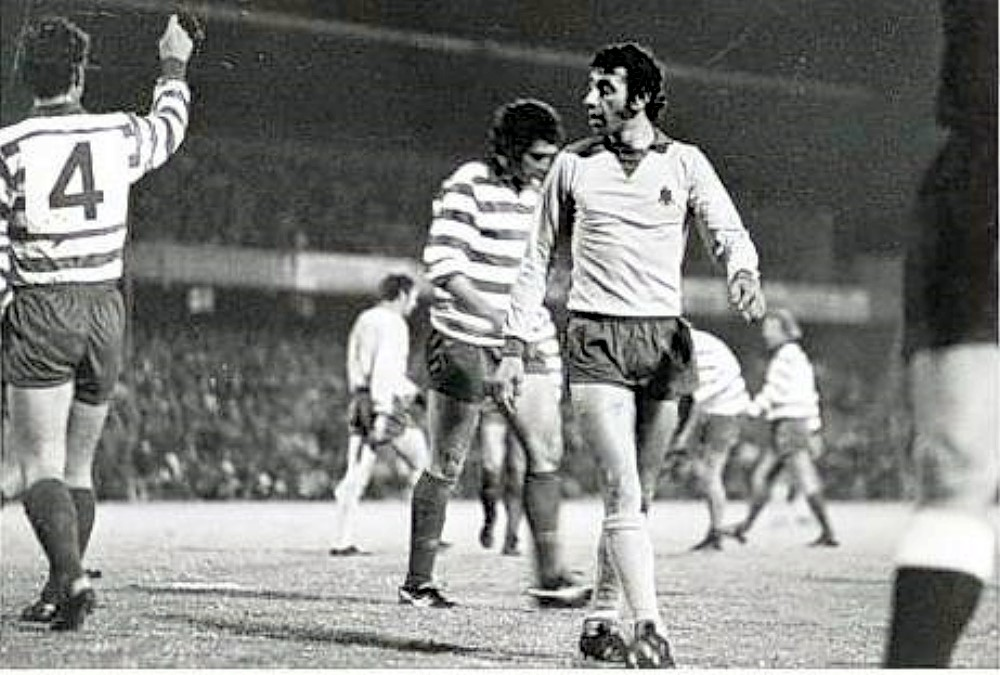
Frank 'Jingles' Pereira, v Durban City

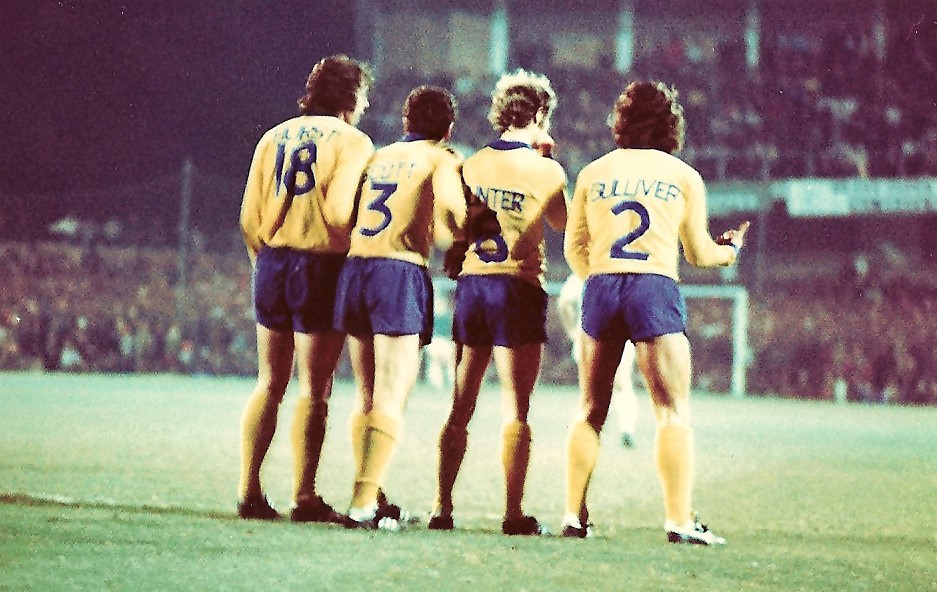
Cape Town City forms a wall, consisting of Geoff Hurst, Ken Scott, Willy Hunter and Terry Gulliver

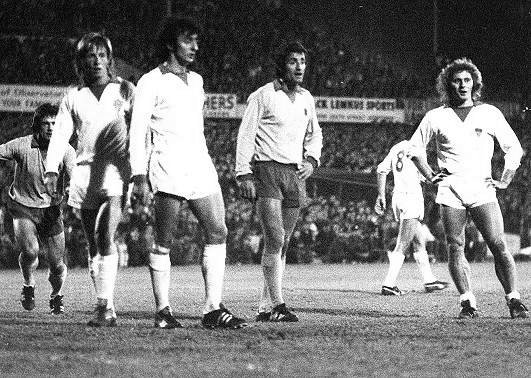
Cape Town City defends a corner, v Hellenic L to R: Jim Forest, Eric Welsh, Wilf du Bruin, Frank McLintock and Arno Steffenhagen
