= Berea Park F.C. =

Association football club of Pretoria, South Africa

Berea Park
- Founded: 1918 (as Pretoria S.A.R. until 1935)
- Ground: Berea Park, Pretoria
Home colours

Berea Park F.C. was a South African football club based in Pretoria. In the 2010s they participated in the Premier Soccer League(PSL). They were previously known as Pretoria South African Railway until their name change in 1935. Merged with Santos FC and took their place in the NFL before the 1960-season.

They later participated in the all-white National Football League of South Africa.

Year	League	Position	Played	Won	Drew	Loss	Goals for	Goals against	Points	
1960	NFL	11	28	11	1	16	63	80	23	
1961	NFL	13	30	9	3	18	55	85	21	
1962	NFL	16	34	6	11	17	63	92	23	
1963	NFL	14	34	12	2	20	55	84	26	
1964	NFL	16	32	5	8	19	49	98	18	Relegated
⋮
1969	NFL II	1	18	12	6	0	60	17	30	Promoted
1970	NFL	15	28	5	5	18	32	59	15	
1971	NFL	13	26	4	8	14	25	47	16	
1972	NFL	3	28	13	8	7	35	22	34	
1973	NFL	13	28	7	9	12	30	41	20	[23?]
1974	NFL	13	28	6	6	16	21	48	18	
1975	NFL	13	28	6	8	14	27	51	20	
1976	NFL	14	28	4	10	14	25	44	18	Relegated

== Honours ==
- Ward and Salomons Cup winner: 1953
- Transvaal Challenge Cup winner: 1953, 1987
