= East London United F.C. =

East London United
- Full name: East London United Football Club
- Ground: East London United stadium, East London
Home colours

East London United is a South African soccer club based in Eastern Cape.

== History ==
Formed in 1967, East London Celtic were promoted to the NFL for the 1969-season. Before the following season, they were renamed East London United. They struggled throughout their spell in the NFL, their best seasons being 1970, 1976 and 1977, when they finished 9th.

== See also ==
- National Football League (South Africa)
