= Germiston Callies F.C. =

Germiston Callies
- Full name: Germiston Caledonian Society Association Football Club
- Nickname(s): Callies
- Founded: 1906
- Dissolved: 1978
- Ground: Driehoek stadium, Germiston
- Capacity: record crowd was approximately 13,900
- Chairman: At formation of NFL Bill McGarvie, later H.W. Holdsworth
Home colours

Germiston Callies was a South African football (soccer) club based in Germiston.

== Origins ==
Founded by Scottish immigrants (mainly railway men and miners) in 1906. The club's original full name was Germiston Caledonian Society Amateur Football Club, the name was changed when the club turned professional in 1959.

== Leagues ==
Callies originally played in the amateur Transvaal League and were quite successful. One of their outstanding players during this period was Berry Nieuwenhuys, who later captained Liverpool in the English First Division. Callies won the Transvaal league at least 6 times and the challenge cup 9 times.

=== NFL ===
The club joined the professional National Football League (NFL) on its inception in 1959, and stayed in that league until its demise in 1977. Although Germiston Callies FC reached the Castle Cup final in 1959, they never really fulfilled expectations. They came third in the league two years running, in 1960 and 1961, and in 1962 won the UTC Bowl but that's as good as it got. Their reliance on local talent was a source of pride, but made it increasingly difficult to compete during the 1960s as the top clubs of the NFL filled their ranks with seasoned professionals from overseas. The Callies usually stayed comfortably clear of relegation, though, until the final NFL season in 1977, when they finished last of the 13 teams.

=== NPSL ===
When the NFL folded, the club joined the National Professional Soccer League (NPSL) for a single season in 1978, playing under the name Imperial Callies.

== Honours ==
- 1962 – UTC Bowl Winners

== Managers ==
- Donald Burne (1959–1964)
- Alfie Boyd (1965–1967)
- Mickey Lill (1968–1973, 1977–1979)
- Mike Kenning (1974–1976)
- Willie Havenga (1978)

== See also ==
- National Football League (South Africa)
