= Arcadia Shepherds F.C. =

South African football club

Arcadia Shepherds
- Full name: Arcadia Shepherds Football Club
- Nickname: Arcs
- Founded: 1903; 123 years ago
- Ground: Caledonian Stadium, Pretoria
- Capacity: 5000
- Chairman: Ricky Manna
- Manager: Lucky Manna
- League: Vodacom League, Gauteng Province
- 2010–11 season: 7th
- Website: arcadiashepherdsfc.blogspot.com
Home colours

Arcadia Shepherds are a South African association football club based in Arcadia, Pretoria. It is affiliated with the Football Association of Pretoria (FAP).

== History ==
The club was founded in 1903, and was briefly renamed Arcadia United in the seasons from 1963–68, following a merger with ISCOR Pretoria. Arcadia Shepherds experienced their most successful season in 1974, where they won "the triple": NFL Championship, Castle Cup and the NFL UTC Bowl Cup. The next three big achievements by the club, was when they won the NPSL League Cup Competition in 1982, after an exciting final against Highlands Park; then a victory in the NPSL Sales House Cup in 1985 as Arcadia Fluoride, beating Kaizer Chiefs in the final; and next year in 1986 they won the BP Top Eight Cup, beating Wits University in the final. Since then, the achievements by the team have been modest. They managed to win a NPSL championship in 1992, but this was at a time when all the best teams were playing in the NSL.

The club was whites-only during the apartheid era. More recently Shepherds have been known for producing players like Phil Evans, Bongani Khumalo and Katlego Mphela.
