= Durban United F.C. =

South African football club

Durban United
- Full name: Durban United Football Club
- Ground: New Kingsmead, Durban, South Africa
- League: National Football League (South Africa)

Durban United FC was a South African football club based in Durban. Durban United FC won the Castle Cup in 1972 and played in the final in 1977.

Durban Spurs merged with Durban United into Durban Spurs United for 1970; the merger club soon reverted its name to Durban United. When the NFL folded after the 1977 season, the club joined the FPL under the name Suburbs United. Despite finishing runners-up to Durban City in the 14-team league, the club disbanded at the close of the 1978 season.

== See also ==
- National Football League (South Africa)
