= Hellenic F.C. =

Hellenic
- Full name: Hellenic Football Club
- Nickname: Greek Gods
- Founded: 1958; 68 years ago
- Ground: Tygerhof Milnerton, Cape Town
- Manager: Mark Byrne
- League: Cape Town Tygerburg FA U/18 (only)
Home colours	Away colours

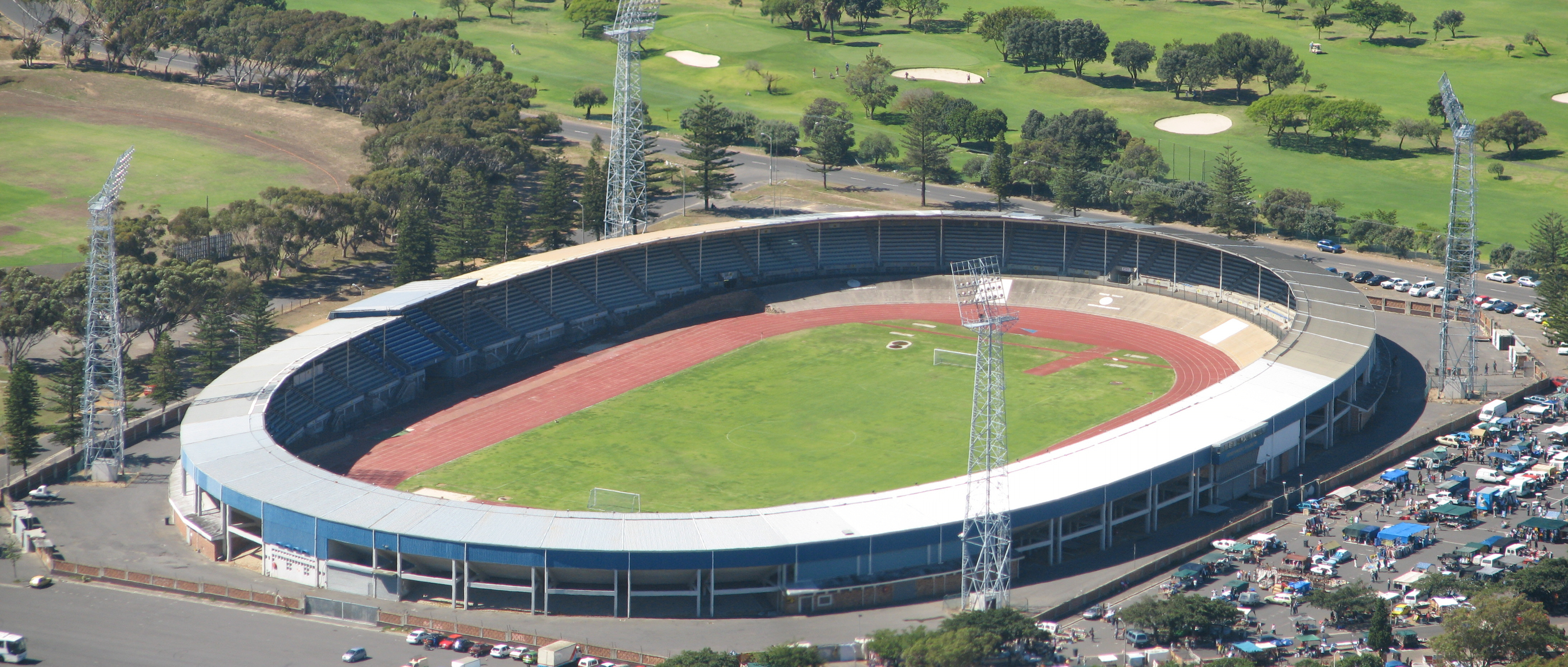
Green Point Stadium in 2007

Hellenic FC is a South African association football club based in Cape Town. They are nicknamed The Greek Gods.

== History ==
Established in 1958 by Greek South Africans, Hellenic campaigned in the lower amateur leagues of Cape Town. But by the 1970s they were one of the leading teams in the country and regularly pulled in crowds of more than 20,000. They were champions in 1971 and runners-up in 1972 and 1975. Hellenic reached the final of the league cup competition then widely known as the Castle Cup in 1976, losing 2–0 to Cape Town City. In 1994 Hellenic lost the final of the NSL/PSL League Cup, then known as the Coca-Cola Cup, losing to QwaQwa Stars 2–3 after extra time.

In 1972 Hellenic attracted a number of German internationals who were barred from playing in clubs associated with FIFA due to their involvement in a match-fixing scandal.

In early 2004, the club's franchise was sold by its Greek owners to the Ndlovu family who renamed it Premier United and moved it to Benoni, Gauteng, which was renamed to Thanda Royal Zulu FC in 2007. In 2011, the Hellenic franchise took over the former Blaauwberg City FC, under the management of Mark Byrne. Byrne sought to revive the quality of the 1970s, to become one of the best youth developments in the country. In 2013, the club acquired a SAB League franchise (South African 4th Division). In August 2016, the club announced that they had sold their SAFA Second Division franchise to "achieving our aim to be the number one youth structure in Cape Town."

Formerly at home at the Green Point Stadium, Hellenic is currently based at the Tygerhof Milnerton.

== Honours ==
- National Championship (NFL): 1971
  - Runners-up: 1972, 1975
- Cup (NFL)
  - Runners-up: 1976
- UTC Bowl: 1972
  - Runners-up: 1971
- NSL/PSL League Cup
  - Runners-up: 1994

== Notable personnel ==
Players

- (England) Bobby Moore (1974)
- (South Africa) Wilf de Bruin (1970–1983/194 goals)
- (South Africa) Dale Liesching (1975 – 1982/86 goals)
- (South Africa) Sergio Dos Santos (1968–1976)
- (England) George Eastham (1971–1972/Player of the Year 1971)
- (Germany) Volkmar Groß (1972)
- (England) Roger Hunt (1971)
- (Germany) Arno Steffenhagen (1972)
- (Germany) Bernd Patzke (1973)
- (Scotland) Ian St John (1971)
- (South Africa) Richard Anderson (Ziggy) (1969–1971)

Coaches

- (England) Harry Game (????–1971)
- (England) George Eastham Sr. (1971–1972)
- (England) Budgie Byrne (1970s–80s)
- (Zimbabwe) Bruce Grobbelaar (2001)
- (England) Ian Towers (1982–1985)
- (Serbia) Zoran Pešić (2002)

== League record ==
=== South African Premier Division ===
- 1996–97 – 4th
- 1997–98 – 10th
- 1998–99 – 12th
- 1999–00 – 8th
- 2000–01 – 14th
- 2001–02 – 16th
- 2002–03 – 14th
- 2003–04 – 15th

=== National First Division ===
- 2004–05 – 3rd

=== SAFA Second Division ===
- 2015–16 – 4th

== See also ==
- National Football League (South Africa)
- Castle Cup football

== Link ==
- A collection of Hellenic Football Club photographs
- Ian King, Josef Bobrowsky: South Africa Cup Winners, Rec.Sport.Soccer Statistics Foundation, 25 February 2001
