= Australia men's national soccer team results (1950–1979) =

This article provides details of international soccer games played by the Australia men's national soccer team from 1959 to 1979.

== 1950s ==
=== 1950 ===
| 11 June International Friendly | Southern Rhodesia | 0–5 | Australia | Salisbury, Southern Rhodesia |
| | | Report | Johns 6' (?); Hulme 34', 77'; Parsons 46' | Stadium: Old Hararians Ground; Attendance: 5,000 |

| 17 June International Friendly | Southern Rhodesia | 1–4 | Australia | Bulawayo, Southern Rhodesia |
| 15:45 | Badenhorst 67' | Report | Johns 25'; Hulme 42'; Sanders 65' | Stadium: Queens Sports Club; Attendance: 6,000 |

| 24 June International Friendly | South Africa | 3–2 | Australia | Durban, South Africa |
| | Claassens 15', 82'; Botha 69' | Report | Nunn 38'; Hulme 80' | Stadium: Kingsmead Cricket Ground; Attendance: 20,000; Referee: J. Edgar (South Africa) |

| 1 July International Friendly | South Africa | 2–1 | Australia | Johannesburg, South Africa |
| | Claassens 39', 48' | Report | Nunn 70' (pen.) | Stadium: Ellis Park Stadium; Attendance: 20,000; Referee: Rautenbach (South Africa) |

| 8 July International Friendly | South Africa | 1–2 | Australia | Port Elizabeth, South Africa |
| | Claassens 54' | Report | Parsons 66', 70' | Stadium: Crusader Ground; Attendance: 8,000; Referee: A.S. Finlay (South Africa) |

| 22 July International Friendly | South Africa | 0–2 | Australia | Cape Town, South Africa |
| | | Report | Nunn 49', 71' | Stadium: Hartleyvale Stadium; Attendance: 12,000; Referee: Stanley Krantz (South Africa) |

=== 1954 ===
| 14 August International Friendly | Australia | 1–2 | New Zealand | Melbourne, Australia |
| 14:45 UTC+10 | Robertson 75' | Report | King 5'; Steele Jr. 7' | Stadium: Melbourne Showgrounds; Referee: George Gatt (Australia) |

| 28 August International Friendly | Australia | 4–1 | New Zealand | Brisbane, Australia |
| 15:15 | Robertson 19'; Stewart 30', 88'; Lennard 50' | Report | Smith 52' | Stadium: Brisbane Cricket Ground; Attendance: 6,400; Referee: V. Robertson (Australia) |

| 4 September International Friendly | Australia | 4–1 | New Zealand | Sydney, Australia |
| 15:00 | Stewart (?); Nunn (?); Murray (?) | Report | Steele Jr. (?) | Stadium: Sydney Sports Ground; Attendance: 5,798; Referee: Dick Thorpe (Australia) |

=== 1955 ===
| 3 September International Friendly | Australia | 0–3 | South Africa | Brisbane, Australia |
| 15:00 | | Report | Palmer 2'; Paton (?); Hughes 88' | Stadium: Brisbane Cricket Ground; Attendance: 5,642; Referee: Bill Malcolm (Australia) |

| 10 September International Friendly | Australia | 0–2 | South Africa | Melbourne, Australia |
| | | Report | Palmer 84'; Hughes 86' | Stadium: Melbourne Showgrounds; Attendance: 1,809; Referee: W. Curren (Australia) |

| 17 September International Friendly | Australia | 0–8 | South Africa | Adelaide, Australia |
| | | Report | Rufus (?); Hughes (?); Paton (?); Jacques (?); Palmer (?); Fourle (?) | Stadium: Kensington Oval; Attendance: 3,088; Referee: Joe Harvey (Australia) |

| 24 September International Friendly | Australia | 0–6 | South Africa | Sydney, Australia |
| | | Report | Hughes (?); Paton (?); Palmer (?); Le Roux (?); Wilson 85' (o.g.) | Stadium: Sydney Cricket Ground; Attendance: 5,431; Referee: Ron Wright (Australia) |

| 1 October International Friendly | Australia | 1–4 | South Africa | Newcastle, Australia |
| | Vairy 39' | Report | Hughes (?); Le Roux 9' | Stadium: Newcastle Sports Ground; Attendance: 2,907; Referee: Gordon Muir (Australia) |

=== 1956 ===
| 27 November 1956 Summer Olympics First round | Australia | 2–0 | Japan | Melbourne, Australia |
| 15:30 UTC+11 | McMillan 26' (pen.); Loughran 61' | Report | | Stadium: Olympic Park; Attendance: 3,568; Referee: Reginald Lund (New Zealand) |

| 1 December 1956 Summer Olympics Quarter-finals | Australia | 2–4 | India | Melbourne, Australia |
| 13:30 UTC+11 | Morrow 17', 41' | Report | D'Souza 9', 33', 50'; Kittu 80' | Stadium: Olympic Park; Attendance: 12,000; Referee: C.H. Wensveen (Indonesia) |

| 12 December International Friendly | Australia | 1–7 | India | Sydney, Australia |
| | Vogler (?) | Report | P.K. Banerjee (?); D'Souza 25' (?); Kittu (?); S. Banerjee (?) | Stadium: Sydney Sports Ground; Attendance: 3,000; Referee: Herbert Imlay (Australia) |

=== 1958 ===
| 16 August International Friendly | New Zealand | 2–3 | Australia | Wellington, New Zealand |
| | Aird 30' (pen.); Hume (?) | Report | Nunn 11', 44'; Adair 65' | Stadium: Basin Reserve; Attendance: 7,000; Referee: Maurice Swain (New Zealand) |

| 23 August International Friendly | New Zealand | 2–2 | Australia | Auckland, New Zealand |
| | Steele Jr. 11', 46' | Report | Aird 41' (o.g.); Vogler 51' | Stadium: Carlaw Park; Attendance: 8,500; Referee: R. Lund (New Zealand) |

== 1960s ==
=== 1965 ===
| 21 November 1966 FIFA World Cup qualification | North Korea | 6–1 | Australia | Phnom Penh, Cambodia |
| | Doo-ik 15'; Seung-Zin 54', 80'; Seung-hwi 58'; Bong-zin 65', 88' | Report | Scheinflug 70' (pen.) | Stadium: National Olympic Stadium; Attendance: 60,000; Referee: Patrick Nice (Malaysia) |

| 24 November 1966 FIFA World Cup qualification | Australia | 1–3 | North Korea | Phnom Penh, Cambodia |
| | Scheinflug 15' | Report | Kim Seung-Il 18', 75'; Seung-zin 53' | Stadium: National Olympic Stadium; Attendance: 55,000; Referee: Gregory Anthony de Silva (Singapore) |

| 26 November International Friendly | Cambodia | 0–0 | Australia | Phnom Penh, Cambodia |
| | | Report | | Stadium: National Olympic Stadium; Attendance: 20,000; Referee: Alng Kim Ean (Cambodia) |

| 29 November International Friendly | Hong Kong | 1–0 | Australia | Hong Kong, China |
| | McLaren 22' | Report | | Stadium: Government Stadium; Attendance: 8,780; Referee: Len Ken-Chie (Hong Kong) |

| 7 December International Friendly | Malaysia | 0–1 | Australia | Ipoh, Malaysia |
| | | Report | Pearson 17' | Stadium: Perak Stadium; Attendance: 1,250; Referee: Boswell (Malaysia) |

| 8 December International Friendly | Malaysia | 0–3 | Australia | Ipoh, Malaysia |
| | | Report | Todd 54'; Johnston 65'; Scheinflug 84' (pen.) | Stadium: Perak Stadium; Attendance: 300 |

=== 1967 ===
| 28 May International Friendly | Australia | 0–1 | Scotland | Sydney, Australia |
| | | Report | Ferguson 31' | Stadium: Royal Agricultural Showground; Attendance: 34,792; Referee: Bill Hosie (Australia) |
Note: The match was originally not considered as an international A match by the Scottish Football Association, but later was reclassified.

| 31 May International Friendly | Australia | 1–2 | Scotland | Adelaide, Australia |
| | Baartz 34' | Report | Townsend 25'; Morgan 68' | Stadium: Norwood Oval; Attendance: 10,315; Referee: Des Maitland (Australia) |
Note: The match was originally not considered as an international A match by the Scottish Football Association, but later was reclassified.

| 3 June International Friendly | Australia | 0–2 | Scotland | Melbourne, Australia |
| | | Report | Ferguson 61', 82' | Stadium: Olympic Park; Attendance: 22,138; Referee: Tony Boskovic (Australia) |
Note: The match was originally not considered as an international A match by the Scottish Football Association, but later was reclassified.

| 5 November 1967 South Vietnam Independence Cup Group A | Australia | 5–3 | New Zealand | Saigon, South Vietnam |
| | Baartz 7'; Warren 13'; Abonyi 51', 75', 84' (pen.) | Report | Mears (?); Nemeth (?); Shaw (?) | Stadium: Cong Hoa Stadium; Attendance: 20,000; Referee: Hong Duk-yong (South Korea) |

| 7 November 1967 South Vietnam Independence Cup Group A | South Vietnam | 0–1 | Australia | Saigon, South Vietnam |
| | | Report | Warren 35' | Stadium: Cong Hoa Stadium; Referee: N.F. Nice (Malaysia) |

| 11 November 1967 South Vietnam Independence Cup Group A | Australia | 5–1 | Singapore | Saigon, South Vietnam |
| | Westwater 19'; Abonyi 27', 36', 39'; Baartz 53' | Report | Yeo (?) | Stadium: Cong Hoa Stadium; Attendance: 10,000 |

| 12 November 1967 South Vietnam Independence Cup Semi-finals | Australia | 1–0 (a.e.t.) | Malaysia | Saigon, South Vietnam |
| | Baartz 101' | Report | | Stadium: Cong Hoa Stadium; Attendance: 30,000 |

| 14 November 1967 South Vietnam Independence Cup Final | Australia | 3–2 | South Korea | Saigon, South Vietnam |
| | Vojtek 36'; Warren 52'; Abonyi 84' | Report | Yong-kun 1'; Yoon-chung 85' | Stadium: Cong Hoa Stadium; Attendance: 30,000 |

| 17 November International Friendly | Indonesia | 0–2 | Australia | Jakarta, Indonesia |
| | | Report | Baartz 37'; Abonyi 43' | Stadium: Gelora Bung Karno Stadium; Attendance: 20,000 |

| 21 November International Friendly | Singapore | 1–6 | Australia | Kallang, Singapore |
| | Awang 69' | Report | Abonyi 26', 62', 82'; Westwater 55'; Vojtek 59'; McColl 60' | Stadium: Jalan Besar Stadium; Attendance: 4,000 |

| 27 November International Friendly | Malaysia | 0–4 | Australia | Kuala Lumpur, Malaysia |
| | | Report | McColl 4'; Vojtek 28', 47'; Abonyi (?) | Stadium: Stadium Merdeka; Attendance: 500 |

=== 1968 ===
| 30 March International Friendly | Australia | 2–2 | Japan | Sydney, Australia |
| | McColl 47'; Blue 84' | Report | Kamamoto 18', 65' | Stadium: Sydney Sports Ground; Attendance: 8,646; Referee: Vince Dobinson (Australia |

| 31 March International Friendly | Australia | 3–1 | Japan | Melbourne, Australia |
| | Scheinflug 33'; Vojtek 42'; Baartz 89' | Report | Kuwahara 31' | Stadium: Olympic Park; Attendance: 9,974; Referee: Tony Boskovic (Australia |

| 4 April International Friendly | Australia | 1–3 | Japan | Adelaide, Australia |
| | McColl 70' | Report | Sugiyama 82'; Kamamoto 85', 89' | Stadium: Norwood Oval; Attendance: 6,127; Referee: Des Maitland (Australia |

=== 1969 ===
| 19 July International Friendly | Australia | 1–0 | Greece | Sydney, Australia |
| | Abonyi 60' (pen.) | Report | | Stadium: Sydney Cricket Ground; Attendance: 24,129; Referee: Tony Boskovic (Australia) |

| 23 July International Friendly | Australia | 2–2 | Greece | Brisbane, Australia |
| | Vojtek 48'; Baartz 62' | Report | Dedes 19', 46' | Stadium: Brisbane Exhibition Ground; Attendance: 8,649; Referee: Tony Boskovic (Australia) |

| 27 July International Friendly | Australia | 0–2 | Greece | Melbourne, Australia |
| | | Report | Dedes 22'; Papaioannou 55' | Stadium: Olympic Park; Attendance: 24,416; Referee: Tony Boskovic (Australia) |

| 10 October 1970 FIFA World Cup qualification First round | Japan | 1–3 | Australia | Seoul, South Korea |
| | Watanabe 11' | Report | McColl 5'; Ogi 68' (o.g.); Baartz 69' | Stadium: Dongdaemun Stadium; Attendance: 10,500; Referee: Patrick Nice (Malaysia) |

| 14 October 1970 FIFA World Cup qualification First round | Australia | 2–1 | South Korea | Seoul, South Korea |
| | Watkiss 39'; McColl 82' | Report | Yi-woo 45' | Stadium: Dongdaemun Stadium; Attendance: 25,000; Referee: George Suppiah (Singapore) |

| 16 October 1970 FIFA World Cup qualification First round | Australia | 1–1 | Japan | Seoul, South Korea |
| | McColl 39' | Report | Miyamoto 4' | Stadium: Dongdaemun Stadium; Attendance: 6,000; Referee: George Suppiah (Singapore) |

| 20 October 1970 FIFA World Cup qualification First round | South Korea | 1–1 | Australia | Seoul, South Korea |
| | Park Soo-il 29' | Report | Baartz 58' | Stadium: Dongdaemun Stadium; Attendance: 25,000; Referee: Patrick Nice (Malaysia) |

| 23 November 1970 FIFA World Cup qualification Second round | Rhodesia | 1–1 | Australia | Laurenco Marques, Mozambique |
| | Chalmers 63' | Report | McColl 68' | Stadium: Salazar Stadium; Attendance: 6,500; Referee: António Saldanha Ribeiro (Portugal) |

| 27 November 1970 FIFA World Cup qualification Second round | Australia | 0–0 | Rhodesia | Laurenco Marques, Mozambique |
| | | Report | | Stadium: Salazar Stadium; Attendance: 3,500; Referee: António Saldanha Ribeiro (Portugal) |

| 29 November 1970 FIFA World Cup qualification Second round | Australia | 3–1 | Rhodesia | Laurenco Marques, Mozambique |
| | Rutherford 12'; Tigere 22' (o.g.); Warren 56' | Report | Chalmers 49' | Stadium: Salazar Stadium; Attendance: 1,500; Referee: António Saldanha Ribeiro (Portugal) |

| 4 December 1970 FIFA World Cup qualification Final round | Israel | 1–0 | Australia | Ramat Gan, Israel |
| | Spiegler 18' | Report | | Stadium: Ramat Gan Stadium; Attendance: 41,899; Referee: Ferdinand Marschall (Austria) |

| 14 December 1970 FIFA World Cup qualification Final round | Australia | 1–1 | Israel | Sydney, Australia |
| | Watkiss 88' | Report | Spiegler 78' | Stadium: Sydney Sports Ground; Attendance: 29,737; Referee: Ferdinand Marschall (Austria) |

== 1970s ==
=== 1970 ===
| 4 November International Friendly | Iran | 1–2 | Australia | Tehran, Iran |
| | | Report | Richards 8'; Alston 48' | Stadium: Amjadiah Stadium; Attendance: 22,000; Referee: Daud Nasiri (Iran) |

| 10 November International Friendly | Israel | 0–1 | Australia | Ramat Gan, Israel |
| | | Report | Richards 50' | Stadium: Ramat Gan Stadium; Attendance: 25,000; Referee: Menachem Ashkenazi (Israel) |

| 17 November International Friendly | Greece | 1–3 | Australia | Athens, Greece |
| | Eleftherakis 22' | Report | Alston 11'; Mackay 23'; Blues 77' | Stadium: Panathinaikos Stadium; Attendance: 12,000; Referee: Nikolaos Giannopoulos (Greece) |

| 2 December International Friendly | Mexico | 3–0 | Australia | Mexico City, Mexico |
| | Valdivia 40', 80'; Gomez 55' | Report | | Stadium: Estadio Azteca; Attendance: 25,000; Referee: Abel Aguilar (Mexico) |

=== 1971 ===
| 11 November International Friendly | Australia | 2–2 | Israel | Brisbane, Australia |
| | Tolson 19'; Alston 72' | Report | Kalderon 11'; Spiegler 63' | Stadium: Lang Park; Attendance: 5,062; Referee: Vince Dobinson (Australia) |

| 14 November International Friendly | Australia | 1–0 | Israel | Sydney, Australia |
| | Ainslie 12' | Report | | Stadium: Sydney Sports Ground; Attendance: 11,282; Referee: Tony Boskovic (Australia) |

| 21 November International Friendly | Australia | 1–3 | Israel | Melbourne, Australia |
| | Baartz 87' | Report | Rosen 15'; Shaharabani 46', 84' | Stadium: Olympic Park; Attendance: 9,421; Referee: Roger Lamb (Australia) |

=== 1972 ===
| 7 October International Friendly | Indonesia | 1–4 | Australia | Jakarta, Indonesia |
| | Kadir 83' (pen.) | Report | Buljevic 52', 88'; Tolson 60'; Baartz 78' (pen.) | Stadium: Senayan Stadium; Attendance: 11,258; Referee: Achmad Karim (Indonesia) |

| 9 October International Friendly | New Zealand | 1–3 | Australia | Jakarta, Indonesia |
| | Vest 7' | Report | Abonyi 26'; Baartz 54'; Warren 76' | Stadium: Senayan Stadium; Attendance: 2,000; Referee: Kosasih Kartadiredja (Indonesia) |

| 15 October International Friendly | South Vietnam | 0–1 | Australia | Saigon, South Vietnam |
| | | Report | Buljevic (?) | Stadium: Cong Hoa Stadium; Attendance: 23,000; Referee: Kosasih Kartadiredja (South Vietnam) |

| 22 October International Friendly | South Korea | 1–1 | Australia | Seoul, South Korea |
| | Cha-man 65' | Report | Tolson 12' | Stadium: Dongdaemun Stadium; Attendance: 15,000; Referee: Kim Ju-won (South Korea) |

| 24 October International Friendly | South Korea | 0–2 | Australia | Seoul, South Korea |
| | | Report | Baartz 12'; Armstrong 42' | Stadium: Dongdaemun Stadium; Attendance: 17,000; Referee: Mang Myung-sup (South Korea) |

| 29 October International Friendly | Philippines | 0–6 | Australia | Manila, Philippines |
| | | Report | Abonyi 29' (pen.); Buljevic 52'; Butler 64'; Warren 66'; Utjesenovic 75'; Richards 83' | Stadium: Rizal Memorial Stadium; Attendance: 4,000; Referee: Julian Esguarra (Philippines) |

=== 1973 ===
| 14 February International Friendly | Australia | 2–2 | Bulgaria | Sydney, Australia |
| | Buljevic 56'; Tolson 72' (pen.) | Report | Vasilev 31'; Mikhaylov 44' | Stadium: Sydney Sports Ground; Attendance: 12,648; Referee: Roger Lamb (Australia) |

| 16 February International Friendly | Australia | 1–3 | Bulgaria | Adelaide, Australia |
| | Baartz 29' | Report | Bogomilov 22'; Pritargov 27'; Mikhaylov 81' | Stadium: Hindmarsh Stadium; Attendance: 8,576; Referee: Tony Boskovic (Australia) |

| 18 February International Friendly | Australia | 0–2 | Bulgaria | Melbourne, Australia |
| | | Report | Pritargov 22'; Dermendjiev 57' | Stadium: Olympic Park; Attendance: 9,204; Referee: Don Campbell (Australia) |

| 4 March 1974 FIFA World Cup qualification Group B1 | New Zealand | 1–1 | Australia | Auckland, New Zealand |
| | Turner 57' | Report | Campbell 85' | Stadium: Newmarket Ground; Attendance: 12,000; Referee: Lak Tat-sun (Hong Kong) |

| 11 March 1974 FIFA World Cup qualification Group B1 | Australia | 3–1 | Iraq | Sydney, Australia |
| | Richards 49'; Alston 80', 85' | Report | Nouri 90+2' | Stadium: Sydney Sports Ground; Attendance: 28,514; Referee: Govindsamy Suppiah (Singapore) |

| 13 March 1974 FIFA World Cup qualification Group B1 | Australia | 2–1 | Indonesia | Sydney, Australia |
| | Campbell 22'; Alston 42' | Report | Iswadi 36' | Stadium: Sydney Sports Ground; Attendance: 23,762; Referee: Dau Van Dzu (South Vietnam) |

| 16 March 1974 FIFA World Cup qualification Group B1 | Australia | 3–3 | New Zealand | Sydney, Australia |
| | Utjesenovic 11'; Baartz 19'; Buljevic 26' | Report | Vest 10'; Tindall 50'; Hogg 86' (o.g.) | Stadium: Sydney Sports Ground; Attendance: 14,071; Referee: K. Mahendron Malaysia) |

| 18 March 1974 FIFA World Cup qualification Group B1 | Australia | 0–0 | Iraq | Melbourne, Australia |
| | | Report | | Stadium: Olympic Park; Attendance: 10,684; Referee: Masatoshi Nagashima (Japan) |

| 24 March 1974 FIFA World Cup qualification Group B1 | Australia | 6–0 | Indonesia | Sydney, Australia |
| | Mackay 3', 40'; Abonyi 23', 45'; Richards 72'; Baartz 78' | Report | | Stadium: Sydney Sports Ground; Attendance: 12,390; Referee: Masatoshi Nagashima (Japan) |

| 18 August 1974 FIFA World Cup qualification Group B Final | Australia | 3–0 | Iran | Sydney, Australia |
| | Alston 43'; Abonyi 46'; Wilson 85' | Report | | Stadium: Sydney Sports Ground; Attendance: 28,881; Referee: Rudolf Scheurer (Switzerland) |

| 24 August 1974 FIFA World Cup qualification Group B Final | Iran | 2–0 | Australia | Tehran, Iran |
| | Ghelichkhani 14' (pen.), 32' | Report | | Stadium: Aryamehr Stadium; Attendance: 128,000; Referee: Pavel Kasakov (Soviet Union) |

| 28 October 1974 FIFA World Cup qualification Final round | Australia | 0–0 | South Korea | Sydney, Australia |
| | | Report | | Stadium: Sydney Sports Ground; Attendance: 32,005; Referee: Vital Loraux (Belgium) |

| 10 November 1974 FIFA World Cup qualification Final round | South Korea | 2–2 | Australia | Seoul, South Korea |
| | Jae-han 15'; Jae-wook 27' | Report | Buljevic 29'; Baartz 48' | Stadium: Municipal Stadium; Attendance: 27,000; Referee: Arie van Gemert (Netherlands) |

| 13 November 1974 FIFA World Cup qualification Final round play-off | Australia | 1–0 | South Korea | Hong Kong, China |
| | Mackay 70' | Report | | Stadium: Hong Kong Stadium; Attendance: 28,000; Referee: Arie van Gemert (Netherlands) |

=== 1974 ===
| 25 April International Friendly | Australia | 0–0 | Uruguay | Melbourne, Australia |
| | | Report | | Stadium: Olympic Park; Attendance: 20,283; Referee: Peter Rampley (Australia) |

| 27 April International Friendly | Australia | 2–0 | Uruguay | Sydney, Australia |
| | Baartz 59'; Ollerton 84' | Report | | Stadium: Sydney Cricket Ground; Attendance: 23,302; Referee: Don Campbell (Australia) |

| 21 May International Friendly | Indonesia | 1–2 | Australia | Jakarta, Indonesia |
| | Waskito 89' | Report | Wilson 77'; Curran 80' | Stadium: Senayan Stadium; Attendance: 62,000; Referee: Juremi (Indonesia) |

| 28 May International Friendly | Israel | 2–1 | Australia | Jaffa, Israel |
| | Feygenbaum 58', 88' | Report | Mackay 89' | Stadium: Bloomfield Stadium; Attendance: 14,000; Referee: Jean Dubach (Switzerland) |

| 14 June 1974 FIFA World Cup Group 1 | East Germany | 2–0 | Australia | Hamburg, West Germany |
| 19:30 UTC+1 | Curran 58' (o.g.); Streich 72' | Report | | Stadium: Volksparkstadion; Attendance: 17,000; Referee: Youssou N'Diaye (Senegal) |

| 18 June 1974 FIFA World Cup Group 1 | Australia | 0–3 | West Germany | Hamburg, West Germany |
| 19:30 UTC+1 | | Report | Overath 12'; Cullmann 34'; Müller 53' | Stadium: Volksparkstadion; Attendance: 53,000; Referee: Mahmoud Mustafa Kamel (Egypt) |

| 22 June 1974 FIFA World Cup Group 1 | Australia | 0–0 | Chile | West Berlin, West Germany |
| 16:00 UTC+1 | | Report | | Stadium: Olympiastadion; Attendance: 17,400; Referee: Jafar Namdar (Iran) |
Note: While official match reports show Richards as having been booked twice (in the 37th and 83rd minutes), the referee showed Richards cards on four occasions. He was shown the red card several minutes after being shown his 3rd yellow card.

=== 1975 ===
| 6 August International Friendly | Australia | 1–0 | China | Melbourne, Australia |
| | Cummings 62' | Report | | Stadium: Olympic Park; Attendance: 4,355; Referee: Stewart Mellings (Australia) |

| 16 November International Friendly | Australia | 0–0 | Soviet Union | Perth, Australia |
| | | Report | | Stadium: Perry Lakes Stadium; Attendance: 6,000; Referee: Don Campbell (Australia) |

| 20 November International Friendly | Australia | 0–3 | Soviet Union | Adelaide, Australia |
| | | Report | Shepel 29'; Yevryuzhikhin 39'; Gershkovich 57' | Stadium: Hindmarsh Stadium; Attendance: 8,135; Referee: Barry Harwood (Australia) |

| 23 November International Friendly | Australia | 1–2 | Soviet Union | Melbourne, Australia |
| | Campbell 35' | Report | Yakubik 71'; Kozlov 78' | Stadium: Olympic Park; Attendance: 14,200; Referee: Stewart Mellings (Australia) |

| 26 November International Friendly | Australia | 0–0 | Soviet Union | Brisbane, Australia |
| | | Report | | Stadium: Brisbane Exhibition Ground; Attendance: 6,845; Referee: Des Miles (Australia) |

| 30 November International Friendly | Australia | 2–3 | Soviet Union | Sydney, Australia |
| | Ollerton 21'; Barnes 26' | Report | Gershkovich 43'; Yakubik 47'; Gavrilov (?) | Stadium: Sydney Sports Ground; Attendance: 7,965; Referee: Peter Rampley (Australia) |

| 3 December International Friendly | Australia | 1–1 | Soviet Union | Newcastle, Australia |
| | Ollerton (?) | Report | Gavrilov (?) | Stadium: Newcastle Showground; Attendance: 2,500; Referee: Tony Boskovic (Australia) |

=== 1976 ===
| 29 February International Friendly | New Zealand | 0–1 | Australia | Auckland, New Zealand |
| | | Report | Harding 79' | Stadium: Newmarket Park; Attendance: 12,300 |

| 2 March International Friendly | Australia | 3–1 | New Zealand | Melbourne, Australia |
| | Barnes 7'; Ollerton 14'; Abonyi 70' | Report | Taylor 74' | Stadium: Olympic Park; Attendance: 2,000; Referee: Stewart Mellings (Australia) |

| 11 August International Friendly | Australia | 0–1 | Hong Kong | Canberra, Australia |
| | | Report | Hung-chong 21' | Stadium: Manuka Oval; Attendance: 3,046; Referee: Tony Boskovic (Australia) |

| 18 August International Friendly | Australia | 2–0 | Hong Kong | Gosford, Australia |
| | Abonyi 12'; Harding 27' | Report | | Stadium: Grahame Park; Attendance: 5,000; Referee: Peter Rampley (Australia) |

| 20 October International Friendly | Indonesia | 1–1 | Australia | Jakarta, Indonesia |
| | Rizal 83' | Report | Abonyi 5' | Attendance: 40,000; Referee: Soedorso (Indonesia) |

| 22 October International Friendly | Singapore | 0–1 | Australia | Kallang, Singapore |
| | | Report | Ollerton 48' | Stadium: Kallang National Stadium; Attendance: 40,000; Referee: Lee (Singapore) |

| 24 October International Friendly | Hong Kong | 0–2 | Australia | Hong Kong, China |
| | | Report | Abonyi 35' (pen.); Nyskohus 44' | Stadium: Hong Kong Stadium |

| 29 October International Friendly | China | 0–2 | Australia | Guangzhou, China |
| | | Report | Ollerton (?) | Stadium: Yuexiushan Stadium; Attendance: 35,000 |

| 3 November International Friendly | Israel | 1–1 | Australia | Ramat Gan, Israel |
| | Damti 42' | Report | Wilson 56' | Stadium: National Stadium; Attendance: 15,000; Referee: René Mathieu (Switzerland) |

=== 1977 ===
| 12 February International Friendly | Australia | 1–1 | Israel | Melbourne, Australia |
| | Ollerton 58' | Report | Damti 10' | Stadium: Olympic Park; Attendance: 6,302; Referee: Barry Harwood (Australia) |

| 16 February International Friendly | Australia | 1–1 | Israel | Sydney, Australia |
| | Muniz 59' | Report | Schweitzer 72' | Stadium: Sydney Sports Ground; Attendance: 5,961; Referee: Des Miles (Australia) |

| 13 March 1978 FIFA World Cup qualification Group 5 | Australia | 3–0 | Taiwan | Ba, Fiji |
| | Rooney 8', 46'; Abonyi 16' | Report | | Stadium: Govind Park; Attendance: 8,000; Referee: P. Watana (Thailand) |

| 16 March 1978 FIFA World Cup qualification Group 5 | Taiwan | 1–2 | Australia | Ba, Fiji |
| | Shin-sing 29' | Report | Kosmina 35'; Abonyi 58' | Stadium: Govind Park; Referee: Vijit Getkaew (Thailand) |

| 19 March International Friendly | Fiji | 1–0 | Australia | Suva, Fiji |
| | Okete 75' | Report | | Referee: Bob Khan (Fiji) |

| 27 March 1978 FIFA World Cup qualification Group 5 | Australia | 3–1 | New Zealand | Sydney, Australia |
| | Ollerton 58', 78'; Kosmina 71' | Report | Nelson 3' | Stadium: Sydney Cricket Ground; Attendance: 12,120; Referee: Chan Tam Sun (Hong Kong) |

| 30 March 1978 FIFA World Cup qualification Group 5 | New Zealand | 1–1 | Australia | Auckland, New Zealand |
| | Nelson 34' | Report | Ollerton (!8) | Stadium: Mount Smart Stadium; Attendance: 11,000; Referee: Cheung Kwok Kui (Hong Kong) |

| 10 July 1978 FIFA World Cup qualification Final round | Australia | 3–0 | Hong Kong | Adelaide, Australia |
| | Kosmina 27', 84'; Barnes 46' | Report | | Stadium: Hindmarsh Stadium; Attendance: 14,000; Referee: Walter Hungerbühler (Switzerland) |

| 14 August 1978 FIFA World Cup qualification Final round | Australia | 0–1 | Iran | Melbourne, Australia |
| | | Report | Rowshan (?) | Stadium: Olympic Park; Attendance: 17,735; Referee: Franz Wöhrer (Austria) |

| 27 August 1978 FIFA World Cup qualification Final round | Australia | 2–1 | South Korea | Sydney, Australia |
| | Kosmina 63', 75' | Report | Bum-kun 23' | Stadium: Sydney Sports Ground; Attendance: 8,719; Referee: Jan Keizer (Netherlands) |

| 16 October 1978 FIFA World Cup qualification Final round | Australia | 1–2 | Kuwait | Sydney, Australia |
| | Rooney 85' | Report | Kameel 42' (pen.); Al-Anberi 49' | Stadium: Sydney Sports Ground; Attendance: 12,015; Referee: Michel Vautrot (France) |

| 23 October 1978 FIFA World Cup qualification Final round | South Korea | 0–0 | Australia | Busan, South Korea |
| | | Report | | Stadium: Busan Gudeok Stadium; Attendance: 30,000; Referee: Ulf Eriksson (Sweden) |

| 30 October 1978 FIFA World Cup qualification Final round | Hong Kong | 2–5 | Australia | Hong Kong, China |
| | Hung-chong 65'; Chor-wai 80' | Report | Ollerton 19', 21', 26'; Abonyi 59' (pen.); Bennett 85' | Stadium: Hong Kong Stadium; Attendance: 8,000; Referee: Alexis Ponnet (Belgium) |

| 13 November International Friendly | Singapore | 0–2 | Australia | Singapore |
| | | Report | Ollerton (?); Abonyi (?) |

| 19 November 1978 FIFA World Cup qualification Final round | Kuwait | 1–0 | Australia | Kuwait City, Kuwait |
| | Al-Dakhil 14' | Report | | Stadium: Al Kuwait Sports Club Stadium; Attendance: 25,000; Referee: Josef Bucek (Austria) |

| 25 November 1978 FIFA World Cup qualification Final round | Iran | 1–0 | Australia | Tehran, Iran |
| | Jahani 44' | Report | | Stadium: Aryamehr Stadium; Attendance: 100,000; Referee: Michel Kitabdjian (France) |

=== 1978 ===
| 11 June International Friendly | Australia | 1–2 | Greece | Melbourne, Australia |
| | Cole 62' | Report | Ifandidis 63', 77' | Stadium: Olympic Park; Attendance: 25,000; Referee: Peter Rampley (Australia) |

| 14 June International Friendly | Australia | 0–1 | Greece | Adelaide, Australia |
| | | Report | Ifandidis (?) | Stadium: Hindmarsh Stadium; Attendance: 7,638; Referee: Don Campbell (Australia) |

| 18 June International Friendly | Australia | 1–1 | Greece | Sydney, Australia |
| | Barnes 77' (pen.) | Report | Karavitis 12' | Stadium: Sydney Cricket Ground; Attendance: 15,000; Referee: David Yelland (Australia) |

=== 1979 ===
| 13 June International Friendly | New Zealand | 1–0 | Australia | Auckland, New Zealand |
| | Ormond 58' | Report | | Stadium: Newmarket Park; Attendance: 4,000; Referee: Tom Delahunty (New Zealand) |

| 27 November International Friendly | Taiwan | 0–2 | Australia | Taipei, Taiwan |
| | | Report | Cumming 43'; Cole 74' | Attendance: 2,000 |

== See also ==
- Australia men's national soccer team results (2020–present)
- Australia men's national soccer team results (2000–2019)
- Australia men's national soccer team results (1980–1999)
- Australia men's national soccer team results (1922–1949)
- Australia men's national soccer team results (unofficial matches)
- Australia men's national soccer B team matches
