= 1967 NSW First Division season =

NSW First Division
- Season: 1967
- Champions: St George-Budapest
- Premiers: APIA Leichhardt
- Matches: 132 (regular season) + 7 (finals)
- Best Player: Alan Westwater
- Top goalscorer: John Giacometti (22)
- Highest attendance: 15,600; Pan Hellenic v. APIA (regular season)

The 1967 NSW First Division season was the eleventh season of soccer in New South Wales under the administration of the NSW Federation of Soccer Clubs since its breakaway from the NSW Soccer Football Association in January 1957. The league structure increased to 22 rounds of a home and away regular season, followed by a round robin group stage and closed with a grand final match.

APIA Leichhardt finished first on the ladder with 37 points, to become regular season premiers for the third time after winning their first in 1964. St George-Budapest and South Sydney-Croatia finished in second and third places with 31 and 27 points respectively. Pan Hellenic secured fourth place and a spot in the finals series, edging out Hakoah-Eastern Suburbs on goal difference.

The finals series was held throughout September with APIA Leichhardt and St George-Budapest qualifying for the grand final as the top two teams of the round robin stage. St George won the grand final 5–2.

The pre-season Ampol Cup was also won by St George-Budapest, defeating Hakoah-Eastern Suburbs 2–0.

== Clubs ==
Changes from last season:

- The division was expanded to a twelve-team league format.
- Corinthian BESC were relegated to NSW Second Division after one season back in the top league.
- Canterbury, Melita Eagles (via play-offs) and Polonia-North Side (Division 2 premiers) were all granted entry to the top division.

Club	Ground	Year formed	App	Debut	Last season (Finals)
APIA-Leichhardt	Lambert Park; Sydney Sports Ground	1954	11th	1957	1st (RU)
Canterbury-Marrickville	Arlington Oval	1896 (Note: Reformed in 1943 and 1952)	9th	1957	Div. II
Cumberland United	Mona Park, Auburn	1964 (Note: Auburn and Gladesville merged keeping separate histories)	4th	1964	9th
Hakoah-Eastern Suburbs	Wentworth Park	1939	11th	1957	2nd (W)
Melita Eagles	Mona Park, Auburn	1954	1st	1967	Div. II
Pan Hellenic	Wentworth Park	1957	7th	1961	5th
Polonia-North Side	North Sydney Oval	1960	4th	1961	Div. II
Prague	Sydney Athletics Field	1950	11th	1957	6th
St George-Budapest	Hurstville Oval	1957	9th	1959	3rd (3rd)
South Coast United	Woonona Oval	1958 (Note: Amalgamated with IDSA club Woonona-Bulli in 1961. Continues Corrimal United history)	10th	1958	4th (4th)
South Sydney-Croatia	Arlington Oval	1958	5th	1963	7th
Yugal	Sydney Athletics Field	1961	6th	1962	8th

== Table and results ==
Pos	Team	Pld	W	D	L	GF	GA	GD	Pts	Qualification or relegation
1	APIA-Leichhardt	22	17	3	2	65	19	+46	37	Qualification for Finals series
2	St. George-Budapest (C)	22	13	5	4	43	26	+17	31	Qualification for Finals series
3	South Sydney-Croatia	22	10	7	5	37	26	+11	27	Qualification for Finals series
4	Pan Hellenic	22	10	6	6	58	30	+28	26	Qualification for Finals series
5	Hakoah-Eastern Suburbs	22	10	6	6	37	24	+13	26	
6	Canterbury-Marrickville	22	9	4	9	38	45	−7	22	
7	Prague	22	6	7	9	35	41	−6	19	
8	Polonia-North Side	22	7	5	10	27	56	−29	19	
9	Yugal-Ryde	22	7	4	11	36	54	−18	18	
10	Melita Eagles	22	6	3	13	27	40	−13	15	
11	South Coast United	22	4	6	12	29	40	−11	14	
12	Cumberland United (R)	22	4	2	16	26	57	−31	10	Relegated to Second Division

(C) Champions; (R) Relegated

=== Results ===
Home \ Away	API	CAN	CRO	CUM	HAK	MEA	PAN	PNS	PRA	SCU	SGB	YUG
APIA		5–0	1–2	2–1	2–0	2–1	3–2	8–1	3–0	3–1	0–0	4–0
Canterbury-Marrickville	0–2		1–1	4–1	0–0	1–1	5–4	1–1	1–2	1–0	0–1	4–3
South Sydney-Croatia	1–0	5–1		2–1	0–1	1–1	2–0	0–4	2–2	1–1	1–1	5–0
Cumberland United	2–2	1–5	0–0		0–1	1–0	1–2	2–4	2–1	3–0	1–3	2–4
Hakoah	2–3	1–3	0–1	2–1		1–0	1–1	4–0	1–0	1–1	2–3	6–0
Melita Eagles	0–2	1–0	1–3	5–0	1–3		0–4	1–2	1–0	2–1	0–2	2–1
Pan Hellenic	1–3	7–0	2–3	2–3	4–0	0–0		7–1	1–1	1–0	2–0	2–2
Polonia-North Side	2–5	0–5	2–1	2–0	1–1	2–4	0–6		0–2	1–0	1–1	0–0
Prague	0–4	5–1	2–2	5–1	0–2	5–2	1–1	0–0		4–4	0–3	0–3
South Coast United	2–2	1–2	1–0	4–2	1–1	3–2	1–2	0–1	1–3		0–0	3–1
St George-Budapest	1–4	1–2	2–1	5–0	1–6	2–1	0–0	4–1	5–1	4–3		2–0
Yugal-Ryde	0–5	2–1	2–3	2–1	1–1	4–1	3–7	4–1	1–1	3–1	0–2	

Legend: Blue = home team win; Yellow = draw; Red = away team win.

== Finals series ==
=== Round robin ===
==== Final table ====
Pos	Team	Pld	W	D	L	GF	GA	GD	Pts	Qualification or relegation
1	APIA-Leichhardt	3	2	1	0	5	1	+4	5	Qualification for Grand final
2	St. George-Budapest (C)	3	2	0	1	4	3	+1	4	Qualification for Grand final
3	South Sydney-Croatia	3	1	0	2	1	3	−2	2	
4	Pan Hellenic	3	0	1	2	2	5	−3	1	

(C) Champions

==== Results ====
3 September 1967	South Sydney-Croatia	1–0	Pan Hellenic	Moore Park, Sydney
	Swoboda 1'	Report		Stadium: Sydney Sports Ground; Attendance: 11,600 (Note: Double-header); Referee: Harold Parsons

3 September 1967	APIA-Leichhardt	2–0	St George-Budapest	Moore Park, Sydney
	Campana 73'; Giacometti 75'	Report		Stadium: Sydney Sports Ground; Attendance: 11,600; Referee: Norm Jones

10 September 1967	St George-Budapest	3–1	Pan Hellenic	Moore Park, Sydney
	McColgan 17'; Warren 56'; Fernandez 60'	Report	Blitz 65'	Stadium: Sydney Sports Ground; Attendance: 13,609; Referee: Tony Boskovic

10 September 1967	APIA-Leichhardt	2–0	South Sydney-Croatia	Moore Park, Sydney
	Kerklaan 57'; Giacometti 78'	Report		Stadium: Sydney Sports Ground; Attendance: 13,609; Referee: Frank Woolman

17 September 1967	APIA-Leichhardt	1–1	Pan Hellenic	Moore Park, Sydney
	Blue 56'	Report	Howard 11'	Stadium: Sydney Sports Ground; Attendance: 7,600; Referee: Harold Parsons

17 September 1967	St George-Budapest	1–0	South Sydney-Croatia	Moore Park, Sydney
	Warren 69'	Report		Stadium: Sydney Sports Ground; Attendance: 7,600; Referee: Tony Boskovic

=== Grand final ===
24 September 1967

St George-Budapest	5–2	A.P.I.A.-Leichhardt
Stegbauer 32'; McColgan 48'; Cliss 52', 77', 84'	Report	Kerklaan 20'; Blue 23'

Sydney Sports Ground, Moore Park, Sydney
Attendance: 16,741
Referee: Tony Boskovic

GK	1	(Scotland) Frank Haffey
RB	2	(Australia) Stuart Isaac
LB	3	(England) Roger Hillary
RH	4	(Australia) Manfred Schaefer
CH	5	(Australia) Morgan
LH	6	(Hungary) Tibor Zuckerman
OR	7	(Austria) Herbert Stegbauer
IR	8	(Australia) Johnny Warren
CF	9	(Scotland) Frank McColgan
IL	10	(England) David Cliss
OL	11	(Argentina) Vic Fernandez
Coach:
(Hungary) Laurie Hegyes

GK	1	(Australia) Taylor
RB	2	(Australia) Cliff van Blerk
LB	3	(England) Stan Ackerley
RH	4	(Scotland) Pat Hughes
CH	5	(Australia) Johnny Watkiss
LH	6	(Australia) Phil Bottalico
OR	7	(Australia) Campbell
IR	8	(Argentina) Ricardo Campana
CF	9	(Australia) Archie Blue
IL	10	(Australia) Bill Kerklaan
OL	11	(Australia) John Giacometti
Coach:
(Australia) Mike Mazzina

NSWSF First Division
1967 Grand Final winners

St George-Budapest
First Title

== Consolation Cup ==
The Consolation Cup was a new knockout series held for the first time in the league for bottom eight teams not competing in the First Division semifinals and the top four teams of the Second Division. Teams ranked 9 to 12 (First Division) and 1 to 4 (Second Division) competed in the first round and were joined by teams ranked 5 to 8 (First Division) in the quarter-finals.

Round 1
8	Cumberland	1
9	Manly	2
5	Yugal (a.e.t.)	4
12	Sutherland	2
6	Melita	2
10	Granville	1
7	South Coast (a.e.t.)	2
11	Bankstown	2

Quarterfinals
1	Hakoah	2
9	Manly	0
4	Polonia	0
5	Yugal	2
2	Canterbury	1
6	Melita	2
3	Prague	2
7	South Coast	1

Semifinals
1	Hakoah	3
5	Yugal	1
6	Melita Eagles	0
3	Prague	4

Finals
1	Hakoah	2
3	Prague	1

=== Round 1 ===
Wednesday, 30 August 1967	Yugal	4–2 (a.e.t.)	Sutherland	Kensington, Sydney
	Bobic (x2); Halpin; Vesich	Report	Roach; Cucitti	Stadium: Marks Field

Wednesday, 30 August 1967	South Coast United	2–2 (a.e.t.)	Bankstown	Kensington, Sydney
	Tristram; Patterson	Report	Tansley; Turnbull	Stadium: Marks Field
Note: South Coast progressed on the toss of a coin

Wednesday, 13 September 1967	Melita Eagles	2–1	Granville AEK	Kensington, Sydney
	Azzopardi; Woods 44' (pen.)	Report	Burtonshaw 77'	Stadium: Marks Field; Attendance: 800 (Note: Double-header with Manly–Cumberland match)

Wednesday, 13 September 1967	Cumberland United	1–2	Manly	Kensington, Sydney
	Goldie	Report	Harris; R. Jones	Stadium: Marks Field; Attendance: 800 (Note: Double-header with Melita Eagles–Granville match)

=== Quarter-finals ===
Sunday, 17 September 1967	Hakoah	2–0	Manly	Woonona, Wollongong
	Edmunds (x2)	Report		Stadium: Woonona Oval; Attendance: 763 (Note: Double-header with Prague–South Coast match); Referee: Keith Lockrey

Sunday, 17 September 1967	Prague	2–1	South Coast United	Woonona, Wollongong
	Armytage; Manuel	Report	Barnes	Stadium: Woonona Oval; Attendance: 763 (Note: Double-header with Prague–South Coast match); Referee: N. Jones

Wednesday, 20 September 1967	Polonia-North Side	0–2	Yugal	Kensington, Sydney
		Report	Alagich; Vesich	Stadium: Marks Field; Attendance: 800 (Note: Double-header with Melita Eagles–Canterbury match)

Wednesday, 20 September 1967	Canterbury	1–2	Melita Eagles	Kensington, Sydney
	Kauz	Report	Reid (x2)	Stadium: Marks Field; Attendance: 800 (Note: Double-header with Yugal–Polonia match)

=== Semi-finals ===
Sunday, 1 October 1967	Hakoah	3–1	Yugal	Glebe, Sydney
	Baartz 35', 43'; Jones 90'	Report	Rafanelli 39'	Stadium: Wentworth Park; Referee: N. Jones

Sunday, 1 October 1967	Prague	4–0	Melita Eagles	Glebe, Sydney
	Scheinflug 15' (pen.), 33'; Manuel 20'; Cilia 43' (o.g.)	Report		Stadium: Wentworth Park

=== Final ===
Monday, 2 October 1967

Hakoah	2–1	Prague
unknown; Scheinflug	Report	unknown

Wentworth Park, Glebe, Sydney
Attendance: 1,127
Referee: N. Jones

GK	1	(Australia) Peter Fuzes
RB	2	(Australia) Stewart
LB	3	(England) Ian Hillsdon
RH	4	(Hungary) Robert Fekete
CH	5	(Scotland) Alan Marnoch
LH	6	(Australia) Dennis Yaager
OR	7	(Australia) Jones
IR	8	(England) Danny Walsh
CF	9	(Australia) Edmunds
IL	10	(Australia) Ray Baartz
OL	11	(England) Doug Holden
Coach:
(Socialist Federal Republic of Yugoslavia) Tiko Jelisavcic

GK	1	(Australia) King
RB	2	(Australia) Harcombe
LB	3	(Australia) Blacker
RH	4	(Australia) Zeman
CH	5	(Australia) Rootsey
LH	6	(Argentina) Raul Blanco	Substituted off
OR	7	(Australia) Armytage
IR	8	(Australia) Miner
CF	9	(Australia) Garry Manuel
IL	10	(Australia) Les Scheinflug
OL	11	(Australia) Hoggart
Coach:
(Australia)
Substitutes:
	12	(Australia) Tracey	Substituted on

== Statistics and awards ==
=== Top Star Award ===
Soccer World reporters awarded stars out of six to players throughout the 18 rounds. The player with the highest stars was Alan Westwater with 4.38. Only five players, half the amount from the previous year, averaged four points or more. Below left is the list of all five players and below right is the team of the year:

Player	Team	Rating
Alan Westwater	Pan-Hellenic	4.38
Alan Marnoch	Hakoah-Eastern Suburbs	4.18
Manfred Schaefer	St George-Budapest	4.14
Pat Hughes	APIA Leichhardt	4.09
Johnny Watkiss	APIA Leichhardt	4.00

1966 Team of the Year

=== Top scorers ===
John Giacometti was the season's top goalscorer for the third consecutive year with 22 goals. Below is a list of the top ten goalscorers for the season:

Rank	Player	Team	Goals
1	John Giacometti	APIA-Leichhardt	22
2	Johnny Warren	St. George-Budapest	16
3	John Karyannis	Pan-Hellenic	15
4	Ray Baartz	Hakoah	13
5	Doug Logan	Pan-Hellenic	12
6	Herbert Ninaus	C'bury-Marrickville	11
7	Joe Alagich	Yugal	10
7	Archie Blue	APIA-Leichhardt	10
7	John Keddie	Cumberland	10
10	Gerry Hood	C'bury-Marrickville	9
10	Johnny Watkiss	APIA-Leichhardt	9

=== Attendances ===
Below is a list of attendances by club:

Rank	Club	Total attendance
1	Pan Hellenic	98,500
2	APIA	95,000
3	Croatia	59,000
4	Hakoah	52,300
5	St George-Budapest	50,000
6	Melita Eagles	44,700
7	Canterbury	44,200
8	Prague	39,600
9	Polonia-North Side	39,100
10	Yugal	38,200
11	South Coast United	36,200
12	Cumberland United	27,500

== Other competitions ==
=== Ampol Cup ===
The season began with the eleventh edition of the floodlit pre-season night series (tenth as the Ampol Cup), culminating with the double-header third place playoff and Final in front of 7,000 spectators.

The tournament continued the same point scoring and round robin system from the previous year, with 12 points for a win, 5 points for a draw and 1 point for each goal scored. The four teams progressing from to the semifinals from the group stages were St George and APIA from Group A and Hakoah and Pan Hellenic from Group B. The semifinals, third place play-off and Final were all maintained from previous editions.

==== Finals series ====
Semi-finals
Pan Hellenic	1
St George	3
Hakoah	1
APIA	0

Finals
St George	2
Hakoah	0
Third place playoff
APIA	2
Pan Hellenic	1

==== Final ====
St George	2–0	Hakoah
Warren 58'; McColgan 64'	Report

Wentworth Park, Glebe, Sydney
Attendance: 7,000
Referee: Tony Boskovic

== See also ==
- 1967 in Australian soccer
- 1967 NSWSF season
