= 1966 NSW First Division season =

NSW First Division
- Season: 1966
- Champions: Hakoah
- Premiers: APIA Leichhardt
- Matches: 90 (regular season) + 7 (finals)
- Best Player: Brian Lincoln
- Top goalscorer: John Giacometti (20)
- Highest attendance: 10,500; APIA v. Pan Hellenic (regular season)

The 1966 NSW First Division season was the tenth season of soccer in New South Wales under the administration of the NSW Federation of Soccer Clubs since its breakaway from the NSW Soccer Football Association in January 1957. The league once again played 18 rounds in the home and away regular season, beginning in March and ending in August. APIA Leichhardt finished first on the ladder to become regular season premiers for the second time after winning their first in 1964.

The finals series was primarily held throughout September with a four-team playoff series. For the first time a round robin was held between the top four clubs, culminating with a grand final between the top two placed teams. Hakoah defeated APIA Leichhardt in the decider.

The pre-season Ampol Cup was won for a first time by APIA Leichhardt.

== Clubs ==
Changes from last season:

- The division continued its ten-team league format.
- Polonia-North Side were relegated to NSW Second Division after one season back in the top league.
- Corinthian BESC were reinstated to the top division after one season in NSW Second Division.

Club	Ground	Year formed	App	Debut	Last season (Finals)
A.P.I.A.	Lambert Park; Sydney Sports Ground	1954	10th	1957	3rd (W)
Corinthian BESC	No fixed ground	1957	2nd	1964	Div. II
Cumberland United	Mona Park	1964 (Note: Auburn and Gladesville merged keeping separate histories)	3rd	1964	8th
Hakoah-Eastern Suburbs	Wentworth Park	1939	10th	1957	6th
Pan Hellenic	Wentworth Park	1957	6th	1961	9th
Prague	Sydney Athletics Field	1950	10th	1957	5th
St George-Budapest	Hurstville Oval	1957	8th	1959	2nd (RU)
South Coast United	Woonona Oval	1958 (Note: Amalgamated with IDSA club Woonona-Bulli in 1961. Continues Corrimal United history)	9th	1958	1st (PF)
South Sydney-Croatia	Arlington Oval	1958	4th	1963	7th
Yugal	Sydney Athletics Field	1961	5th	1962	4th (SF)

== Table and results ==
Pos	Team	Pld	W	D	L	GF	GA	GD	Pts	Qualification or relegation
1	A.P.I.A.	18	13	4	1	55	16	+39	30	Qualification for Finals series
2	Hakoah (C)	18	12	3	3	43	19	+24	27	Qualification for Finals series
3	St. George-Budapest	18	9	3	6	49	27	+22	21	Qualification for Finals series
4	South Coast United	18	7	4	7	31	25	+6	18	Qualification for Finals series
5	Pan Hellenic	18	7	4	7	36	34	+2	18	
6	Prague	18	7	3	8	30	49	−19	17	
7	Croatia	18	5	5	8	19	41	−22	15	
8	Yugal	18	5	4	9	24	38	−14	14	
9	Cumberland United	18	4	3	11	30	41	−11	11	
10	Corinthian BESC (R)	18	2	5	11	14	41	−27	9	Relegated to Second Division

(C) Champions; (R) Relegated

=== Results ===
Home \ Away	API	COR	CRO	CUM	HAK	PAN	PRA	SCU	SGB	YUG
APIA		4–0	2–2	3–1	1–1	5–2	8–1	2–0	1–1	1–1
Corinthian BESC	0–5		1–1	0–4	0–5	0–4	0–0	1–1	0–2	1–2
South Sydney-Croatia	2–1	1–1		3–0	3–1	1–0	2–0	0–3	0–3	1–7
Cumberland United	3–6	1–2	1–1		0–5	2–3	2–3	2–1	2–2	0–1
Hakoah	1–3	3–1	3–0	3–0		4–2	1–3	1–1	3–1	2–1
Pan Hellenic	1–2	0–4	1–1	1–1	1–2		4–4	1–0	1–0	4–1
Prague	0–4	1–0	2–1	3–2	0–3	2–3		2–1	0–8	4–0
South Coast United	0–1	2–1	4–0	3–2	0–1	5–3	2–2		0–0	3–2
St George-Budapest	0–3	5–2	9–0	1–2	2–4	0–4	6–2	3–0		3–1
Yugal	0–6	0–0	2–0	0–6	0–0	1–1	2–1	1–5	2–3	

Source: www.socceraust.co.uk
Legend: Blue = home team win; Yellow = draw; Red = away team win.

== Finals series ==
=== Round robin ===
==== Final table ====
Pos	Team	Pld	W	D	L	GF	GA	GD	Pts	Qualification or relegation
1	A.P.I.A.	3	3	0	0	11	3	+8	6	Qualification for Grand final
2	Hakoah-Eastern Suburbs (C)	3	2	0	1	8	4	+4	4	Qualification for Grand final
3	St. George-Budapest	3	1	0	2	5	8	−3	2	
4	South Coast United	3	0	0	3	3	12	−9	0	

(C) Champions

==== Results ====
4 September 1966	St. George-Budapest	3–0	South Coast United	Moore Park, Sydney
	Warren 4', 15'; Zuckerman 26' (pen.)	Report		Stadium: Sydney Sports Ground; Attendance: 11,300 (Note: Double-header); Referee: N. Jones

4 September 1966	APIA Leichhardt	2–0	Hakoah-Eastern Suburbs	Moore Park, Sydney
	Giacometti 32', 44'	Report		Stadium: Sydney Sports Ground; Attendance: 11,300; Referee: H. Parsons

11 September 1966	APIA Leichhardt	3–2	St George-Budapest	Moore Park, Sydney
	van Blerk 75'; Giacometti 81'; Watkiss 82'	Report	Warren 52'; Fernandez 88'	Stadium: Sydney Sports Ground; Attendance: 9,500; Referee: Tony Boskovic

11 September 1966	Hakoah-Eastern Suburbs	3–2	South Coast United	Moore Park, Sydney
	Hood 25', 30', 49'	Report	Freeme 12'; Ringland 67' (pen.)	Stadium: Sydney Sports Ground; Attendance: 9,500; Referee: H. Eilerts

18 September 1966	APIA Leichhardt	6–1	South Coast United	Moore Park, Sydney
	Blue (x2); Watkiss; Giacometti; Gauld; Campana	Report	Freeme	Stadium: Sydney Sports Ground; Attendance: 6,520; Referee: Tony Boskovic

18 September 1966	Hakoah-Eastern Suburbs	5–0	St George-Budapest	Moore Park, Sydney
	Christie (x2); Ninaus; Hood; Fekete	Report		Stadium: Sydney Sports Ground; Attendance: 6,520; Referee: N. Jones

=== Grand final ===
25 September 1966

Hakoah-Eastern Suburbs	2–1	A.P.I.A.
Ninaus 47'; Hood 83'	Report	Giacometti 49'

Sydney Sports Ground, Moore Park, Sydney
Attendance: 7,650
Referee: Tony Boskovic

GK	1	(Australia) Peter Fuzes
RB	2	(Australia) C. Thomson
LB	3	(England) Ian Hillsdon
RH	4	(England) Danny Walsh
CH	5	(Scotland) Alan Marnoch
LH	6	(Scotland) John Duffy
OR	7	(Hungary) Robert Fekete
IR	8	(Australia) Jim Christie
CF	9	(Austria) Herbert Ninaus
IL	10	(Australia) Gerry Hood
OL	11	(England) Doug Holden
Coach:
(Socialist Federal Republic of Yugoslavia) Tiko Jelisavcic

GK	1	(Australia) Bill Rorke
RB	2	(Australia) Cliff van Blerk
LB	3	(England) Stan Ackerley
RH	4	(Scotland) Pat Hughes
CH	5	(Australia) Jimmy Sambrook
LH	6	(Australia) Phil Bottalico
OR	7	(Australia) John Giacometti
IR	8	(Argentina) Ricardo Campana	(red card) 10'
CF	9	(Australia) Johnny Watkiss
IL	10	(Australia) Archie Blue
OL	11	(Australia) Bill Kerklaan
Coach:
(Australia) Joe Marston

NSWSF First Division
1966 Grand Final winners

Hakoah-Eastern Suburbs
Third Title

== Promotion Play-off ==
With the league expanding to twelve teams next competition, Second Division premiers Polonia-North Side were automatically promoted. It was decided that First Division wooden spooners, Corinthian BESC, would play-off against the second and third placed teams from the Second Division to earn the final two spots in the 1967 NSW First Division season.

The three-team play-off was contested over two matches with Canterbury receiving bye straight to the final match. Melita Eagles defeated Corinthians in the first match, gaining direct entry into First Division, leaving Corinthians with one last chance to remain in the top tier with the next match against the aforementioned Canterbury. However, Canterbury would win the match for final play-off spot, 1–0.

Match	Team A	Score	Team B	Scorers
Spot 1	Corinthian BESC	0–3	Melita Eagles	McDonald 2, Jaros (Melita).
Spot 2	Corinthian BESC	0–1	Canterbury	Rinos (C'bury).

== Statistics and awards ==
=== Top Star Award ===
Soccer World reporters awarded stars out of six to players throughout the 18 rounds. The player with the highest stars was Brian Lincoln with 4.27. Only 10 players averaged four points or more. Below left is the list of all ten players and below right is the team of the year:

Player	Team	Rating
Brian Lincoln	South Sydney-Croatia	4.27
Alan Marnoch	Hakoah-Eastern Suburbs	4.18
Adrian Ringland	South Coast United	4.05
Cliff van Blerk	APIA Leichhardt	4.05
Danny Walsh	Hakoah-Eastern Suburbs	4.05
Ricardo Campana	APIA Leichhardt	4.00
Barry Salisbury	South Coast United	4.00
Mita Stojanovic	Yugal	4.00
Johnny Warren	St George-Budapest	4.00
Alan Westwater	Pan Hellenic	4.00

1966 Team of the Year

=== Top scorers ===
John Giacometti was the season's top goalscorer for the second year consecutively, with 20 goals. Below is a list of the top ten goalscorers for the season:

Player	Team	Goals
John Giacometti	APIA	20
George Yardley	St. George	19
Errol Freeme	South Coast	13
John Keddie	Cumberland	13
Johnny Watkiss	APIA	13
Johnny Warren	St. George	12
John Karyannis	Pan Hellenic	11
Herbert Ninaus	Hakoah	11
Jim Harding	Hakoah	9
Joe Alagich	Yugal	8
Bill Kerklaan	APIA	8

=== Attendances ===
Below is a list of attendances by club:

Rank	Club	Total attendance	Highest home attendance
1	APIA Leichhardt	96,200	10,500
2	Pan Hellenic	82,200	8,100
3	St. George-Budapest	50,100	6,100
4	Hakoah-Eastern Suburbs	46,400	7,200
5	Prague	45,500	8,016
6	Yugal	40,000	4,700
7	South Sydney-Croatia	39,000	3,500
8	South Coast United	37,000	4,700
9	Cumberland United	30,600	5,025
10	Corinthian BESC	38,200	3,350

== Other competitions ==
=== Ampol Cup ===
The season began with the tenth edition of the floodlit pre-season night series (ninth as the Ampol Cup), culminating with the double-header third place playoff and Final on 20 March in front of 8,700 spectators.

The event featured a group stage for the first time in its history, splitting the ten teams from First Division into two groups of five. The point scoring was also unique: 12 points for a win and 5 for draw with each goal scored also worth one point. APIA and Prague progressed from Group 1 as did Hakoah and Yugal from Group 2. The semi-finals, third place play-off and Final were all maintained from previous editions.

==== Finals series ====
Semi-finals
Hakoah	2
Prague	0
APIA	3
Yugal	0

Finals
Hakoah	0
APIA	1
Third place playoff
Prague	4
Yugal	0

==== Final ====
20 March 1966

Hakoah	0–1	APIA
	Report	Watkiss

Sydney Showground, Moore Park, Sydney
Attendance: 8,700
Referee: Tony Boskovic

== See also ==
- 1966 in Australian soccer
- 1966 NSWSF season
- 1966 NSW Federation Cup
