= 1967 in Australian soccer =

Soccer in Australia
- Season: 1967

Men's soccer
- Australia Cup: Melbourne Hungaria

The 1967 season was the sixth season of national competitive soccer in Australia and 84th overall.

== National teams ==
=== Australia national soccer team ===
==== Results and fixtures ====
===== Friendlies =====
Australia hosted a three-match test series against Scotland. There was much criticism of the Scottish squad after a number of their best players had elected to stay behind because of their clubs commitments in Europe. The matches were recognised as A international matches for Australia, but not for Scotland.

28 May 1967	Australia	0–1	Scotland	Sydney, Australia
		Report	Ferguson 31'	Stadium: Royal Agricultural Ground; Attendance: 34,792; Referee: Bill Hosie (Australia)

31 May 1967	Australia	1–2	Scotland	Adelaide, Australia
	Baartz ?'	Report	Townsend 25'; Morgan ?'	Stadium: Norwood Oval; Attendance: 12,500; Referee: Dave Maitland (Australia)

3 June 1967	Australia	0–2	Scotland	Melbourne, Australia
		Report	Ferguson 61', 82'	Stadium: Olympic Park Stadium; Attendance: 22,138; Referee: Tony Boskovic (Australia)

===== 1967 South Vietnam Independence Cup =====
The national team was invited to play in the 1967 South Vietnam Independence Cup hosted in South Vietnam. They began against their rivals' New Zealand with the result being a 5–3 win. They had then won against host South Vietnam 1–0 by a goal from Johnny Warren. Australia finished their group stage by winning 5–1 against Singapore. After they won the semi-final in extra time, they won the Final against South Korea 3–2.

====== Group A ======
5 November 1967	Australia	5–3	New Zealand	Saigon, South Vietnam
	Baartz 7'; Warren 13'; Abonyi 51', 75', 84' (pen.)	Report	Mears ?'; Nemeth ?'; Shaw ?'	Stadium: Cộng Hòa Stadium; Attendance: 20,000; Referee: Hong Deok-young (South Korea)

7 November 1967	South Vietnam	0–1	Australia	Saigon, South Vietnam
		Report	Warren 35'	Stadium: Cộng Hòa Stadium; Referee: N.F. Nice (Malaysia)

11 November 1967	Australia	5–1	Singapore	Saigon, South Vietnam
	Westwater 19'; Abonyi 27', 36', 39'; Baartz 53'	Report	Yeo ?' (pen.)	Stadium: Cộng Hòa Stadium; Attendance: 10,000

====== Knockout stage ======
12 November 1967	Australia	1–0 (a.e.t.)	Malaysia	Saigon, South Vietnam
	Baartz 101'	Report		Stadium: Cộng Hòa Stadium; Attendance: 30,000

14 November 1967	Australia	3–2	South Korea	Saigon, South Vietnam
	Vojtek 36'; Warren 52'; Abonyi 84'	Report	Yong-kun 1'; Yoon-jung 85'	Stadium: Cộng Hòa Stadium; Attendance: 30,000

=== Australia national under-23 soccer team ===
==== Friendlies ====
6 November 1967	New Caledonia	2–1	Australia	Noumea, New Caledonia
	Benebig 35'; Nippy 37'	Report	Patterson 89'	Stadium: Stade Numa-Daly Magenta; Attendance: 2,000; Referee: Arthur Williams (New Zealand)

10 November 1967	New Zealand	1–3	Australia	Noumea, New Caledonia
	Breslin ?'	Report	Armytage ?'; Manuel ?'; Patterson ?'	Stadium: Stade Numa-Daly Magenta

== Cup competitions ==
=== Australia Cup ===
The competition began on 8 October 1967. Sixteen clubs had entered the competition with the final two clubs Melbourne Hungaria and APIA Leichhardt qualifying for the Final. Melbourne won the final 4–3 in extra time with a hat-trick from Attila Abonyi and a goal from Frank Stoffels.

=== Final ===
29 October 1968

Melbourne Hungaria	4–3 (a.e.t.)	APIA Leichhardt
Abonyi 19', 53', 95'; Stoffels 74'	Report	Shanks 24' (o.g.); Giacometti 69'; Watkiss 83'

Olympic Park Stadium, Melbourne
Attendance: 11,185
Referee: Vince Dobinson
