= Australia men's national under-23 soccer team results (1967–1999) =

Australia under-23 association football results

This is a list of the Australia national under-23 soccer team results from 1967 to 1999

== 1960s ==
=== 1967 ===
6 November International Friendly	New Caledonia	2–1	Australia	Noumea, New Caledonia
		Report	Manuel (?)	Attendance: 2,000

10 November International Friendly	New Zealand	1–3	Australia	Noumea, New Caledonia
	Breslin (?)	Report	Armytage (?); Manuel (?); Paterson (?)

== 1970s ==
=== 1974 ===
20 March International Friendly	Australia	3–3	Australia B	Moore Park, Australia
	Palinkas (?); Micevski (?); Nyskohus (?)	Report	Valeri (?); Senkalski (?); Butler (?)	Stadium: Sydney Sports Ground; Attendance:

4 April International Friendly	Indonesia	0–1	Australia	Palembang, Indonesia
		Report	Palinkas (?)	Attendance: 20,000

== 1980s ==
=== 1984 ===
14 October 1984 Merlion Cup Group A	Australia	2–1	Indonesia	Kallang, Singapore
	Spink 59'; Farina 70'	Report	Irmis 21'	Stadium: National Stadium; Attendance: 11,029; Referee: Abdul Qadir (Iraq)

19 October 1984 Merlion Cup Group A	Singapore	0–1	Australia	Kallang, Singapore
		Report	Bundalo 6'	Stadium: National Stadium; Attendance: 8,000; Referee: Ricardo Calabria (Argentina)

21 October 1984 Merlion Cup Group A	Netherlands Amateur	5–2	Australia	Kallang, Singapore
	Reglero 18'; Scheepers 50'; Prins 70', 83'; de Kleine 80'	Report	Panagis 11'; Bernal 60' (pen.)	Stadium: National Stadium; Attendance: 8,000; Referee: Ricardo Calabria (Argentina)

26 October 1984 Merlion Cup Semi-final	Iraq	1–1 (9–8 p)	Australia	Kallang, Singapore
	Saeed 116'	Report	Farina 109'	Stadium: National Stadium; Attendance: 4,900; Referee: Ricardo Calabria (Argentina)
	Penalties
	Ali (penalty scored); Saeed (penalty scored); Karim Allawi (penalty scored); Radhi (penalty missed); Hashim (penalty scored); Khalil Allawi (penalty scored); Shihab (penalty scored); Gorgis (penalty scored); Dirjal (penalty scored); Nsaief (penalty scored)		Bernal (penalty scored); Farina (penalty scored); Panagis (penalty scored); Maier (penalty scored); Tredinnick (penalty missed); Gregson (penalty scored); Vlietstra (penalty scored); Hooker (penalty scored); Spink (penalty scored); Mihailidis (penalty missed)

28 October 1984 Merlion Cup Third Place	Netherlands Amateur	3–0	Australia	Kallang, Singapore
	de Kleine 24'; Meulendijks 28'; Regiero (?)	Report		Stadium: National Stadium; Attendance: 25,344; Referee: Sebastian Yap (Singapore)

== 1990s ==
=== 1990 ===
22 August International Friendly	Switzerland	0–0	Australia	Zürich, Switzerland
		Report

29 August International Friendly	Czechoslovakia	2–0	Australia	Hlinsko, Czechoslovakia
	Majorol 44'; Petrouli 88'	Report		Stadium: Stadion FK Hlinsko; Attendance: 2,058; Referee: Mauer (Czech Republic)

=== 1991 ===
26 March International Friendly	Australia	4–1	Malaysia	Canberra, Australia
	Ilic 35'; Mori 48', 90'; Michalakopoulos 60'	Report	Ong Kim 38'	Attendance: Referee: Chris Conti (Australia)

28 March International Friendly	Australia	2–0	Malaysia	Canberra, Australia
	Refenes 85', 87'	Report		Referee: Gordon Dunster (Australia)

19 May 1992 Summer Olympics qualification (OFC)	Australia	4–0	Papua New Guinea	Melbourne, Australia
	Veart 9', 28', 35'; Markovski 41'	Report

22 May 1992 Summer Olympics qualification (OFC)	Australia	2–0	New Zealand	Melbourne, Australia
	Vidmar 15'; Okon 68' (pen.)	Report

26 May 1992 Summer Olympics qualification (OFC)	Australia	7–0	Fiji	Melbourne, Australia
	Veart 33'; Michalakopoulos 34' (pen.), 71'; Gibson 63', 65', 69'; Blagojevic 89'	Report

11 November 1992 Summer Olympics qualification (OFC)	Papua New Guinea	0–5	Australia	Nadi, Fiji
		Report	Veart 13'; Blagojevic 14'; Murphy 24'; Seal 47'; Vidmar 56'

13 November 1992 Summer Olympics qualification (OFC)	New Zealand	1–2	Australia	Nadi, Fiji
		Report	Seal 78', 89'

16 November 1992 Summer Olympics qualification (OFC)	Fiji	0–3	Australia	Nadi, Fiji
		Report	Seal 14', 75'; Veart 22'

=== 1992 ===
3 May International Friendly	South Korea	2–1	Australia	Iri, South Korea
	Tao-yong 21'; Jung-yoon 52'	Report		Stadium: Civil Stadium; Attendance: 18,012; Referee: Lee Sang-yong (South Korea)

5 May International Friendly	South Korea	2–1	Australia	Pyongtak, South Korea
		Report	Gibson (?)

17 May 1992 Summer Olympics qualification (OFC–UEFA play-off)	Australia	1–1	Netherlands	Sydney, Australia
	Vidmar 25'	Report		Stadium: Sydney Football Stadium

24 May 1992 Summer Olympics qualification (OFC–UEFA play-off)	Netherlands	2–2	Australia	Utrecht, Netherlands
		Report	Zelic 43', 113'

4 July International Friendly	Kuwait	2–4	Australia	Papendaal, Netherlands
		Report	Vidmar 10'; Gibson 15'; Mori 35', 70'

26 July 1992 Summer Olympics Group D	Ghana	3–1	Australia	Barcelona, Spain
	Gargo 15'; Ayew 80', 90'	Report	Vidmar 90+1'	Stadium: Estadi de la Nova Creu Alta; Attendance: 4,000; Referee: Ali Bujsaim (United Arab Emirates)

28 July 1992 Summer Olympics Group D	Mexico	1–1	Australia	Barcelona, Spain
	Gargo 15'; Ayew 80', 90'	Report	Vidmar 90+1'	Stadium: Estadi de Sarrià; Attendance: 10,000; Referee: Kiichiro Tachi (Japan)

30 July 1992 Summer Olympics Group D	Denmark	0–3	Australia	Zaragoza, Spain
		Report	Markovski 32'; Mori 60'; Vidmar 75'	Stadium: Estadio la Romareda; Attendance: 10,000; Referee: Kiichiro Tachi (Japan)

2 August 1992 Summer Olympics Quarter-final	Sweden	1–2	Australia	Barcelona, Spain
	Andersson 60'	Report	Markovski 30'; Murphy 55'	Stadium: Camp Nou; Attendance: 30,000; Referee: Brizio Carter (Mexico)

5 August 1992 Summer Olympics Semi-final	Poland	6–1	Australia	Barcelona, Spain
	Kowalczyk 27', 88'; Juskowiak 43', 52', 78'; Murphy 67' (o.g.)	Report	Veart 35'	Stadium: Camp Nou; Attendance: 30,000; Referee: Brizio Carter (Mexico)

7 August 1992 Summer Olympics Bronze Medal	Australia	0–1	Ghana	Barcelona, Spain
		Report	Asare 19'	Stadium: Camp Nou; Attendance: 15,000; Referee: Rezende de Freitas (Brazil)

=== 1994 ===
8 August International Friendly	United States	1–1	Australia	Arnhem, Netherlands
	(unknown) 75'	Report	Muscat 59'	Stadium: Olympic Training Centre

=== 1995 ===
14 January International Friendly	Australia	1–3	Denmark	Sydney, Australia
	Moric 66'	Report	Sonkensen 45'; Sorensen 60'; Nonbo 69'	Stadium: Sydney Football Stadium; Attendance: Referee: Richard Lorenc (Australia)

16 January International Friendly	Australia	1–1	South Korea	Canberra, Australia
	Viduka (?)	Report

18 January International Friendly	Australia	2–1	Japan	Wollongong, Australia
	Mendez 42'; Viduka 58'	Report

21 January International Friendly	Australia	3–1	Japan	Sydney, Australia
	Tiatto 63'; Spiteri 89'; Muscat 90'	Report

17 August International Friendly	Saudi Arabia	2–0	Australia	Taif, Saudi Arabia
		Report

17 August International Friendly	Australia	3–0	Japan	Canberra, Australia
	Bacak 63'; Valkanis 64'; Tome 77'	Report		Stadium: Bruce Stadium

=== 1996 ===
13 January 1996 Summer Olympics qualification (OFC)	Australia	9–1	Vanuatu	Adelaide, Australia
	Mendez 28', 47' (pen.); Spiteri 30', 45', 65'; Tiatto 51'; Viduka 62', 83'; Tome 72'	Report	Mermer 66'	Stadium: Hindmarsh Stadium; Attendance: Referee: Intaz Shah (Fiji)

17 January 1996 Summer Olympics qualification (OFC)	Solomon Islands	2–0 (Note: Australia won the match 4–0, but were penalised for fielding an ineligible player. Solomon Islands were awarded a 2–0 win on 23 January.)	Australia	Adelaide, Australia
		Report	Muscat 23'; Mendez 27' (pen.); Aloisi 47'; Tiatto 88'	Stadium: Hindmarsh Stadium; Referee: Kaltatak Kalokis (Vanuatu)

19 January 1996 Summer Olympics qualification (OFC)	Australia	10–0	Fiji	Adelaide, Australia
	Viduka 29', 76'; Aloisi 32'; Mendez 50' (pen.), 64'; Lozanovski 63', 65'; Milicic 71'; Tome 81', 83'	Report		Stadium: Hindmarsh Stadium; Referee: Derek Rugg (New Zealand)

21 January 1996 Summer Olympics qualification (OFC)	New Zealand	0–5	Australia	Adelaide, Australia
		Report	Spiteri 1', 16', 55'; Lozanovski 20'; Viduka 57'	Stadium: Hindmarsh Stadium; Referee: Intaz Shah (Fiji)

25 January 1996 Summer Olympics qualification (OFC)	Vanuatu	0–12	Australia	Adelaide, Australia
		Report	Bilokapic 2', 56'; Milicic 6', 31'; Bacak 21', 39', 44'; Lozanovski 29', 79', 88'; Tome 61'; Tiatto 72'	Stadium: Hindmarsh Stadium; Referee: Derek Rugg (New Zealand)

27 January 1996 Summer Olympics qualification (OFC)	Australia	7–0	Solomon Islands	Adelaide, Australia
	Moore 14'; Spiteri 30', 48'; Mendez 40' (pen.), 90'; Viduka 42'; Casserly 51'	Report		Stadium: Hindmarsh Stadium

29 January 1996 Summer Olympics qualification (OFC)	Fiji	0–5	Australia	Adelaide, Australia
		Report	Aloisi 3'; Viduka 58'; Tiatto 69'; Lozanovski 80'; Tome 89'	Stadium: Hindmarsh Stadium; Referee: Massino Ravieno (Tahiti)

31 January 1996 Summer Olympics qualification (OFC)	Australia	0–1	New Zealand	Adelaide, Australia
		Report	Elliott 55'	Stadium: Hindmarsh Stadium; Referee: Massino Ravieno (Tahiti)

19 May International Friendly	United States	0–2	Australia	Indianapolis, United States
		Report	Viduka 53', 59'	Attendance: 2,211; Referee: Ted Covaciu (United States)

26 May 1996 Summer Olympics play-off	Canada	2–2	Australia	Edmonton, Canada
	Xausa 21', 88'	Report	Viduka 53', 59'	Stadium: Commonwealth Stadium; Attendance: 13,000; Referee: Kim Milton Nielsen (Denmark)

2 June 1996 Summer Olympics play-off	Australia	5–0 (7–2 agg.)	Canada	Sydney, Australia
	Foxe 16'; Lozanovski 58'; Viduka 82'; Agostino 85'; Muscat 87'	Report		Stadium: Sydney Football Stadium; Attendance: 25,809; Referee: Ali Mohd Bujsaim (United Arab Emirates)

20 July 1996 Summer Olympics Group B	France	2–0	Australia	Miami, United States
	Pires 11'; Maurice 74'	Report		Stadium: Miami Orange Bowl; Attendance: 14,322; Referee: Roberto Ruben Ruscio (Argentina)

22 July 1996 Summer Olympics Group B	Australia	2–1	Saudi Arabia	Miami, United States
	Tsekenis 11'; Viduka 63'	Report	Al-Khilaiwi 37'	Stadium: Miami Orange Bowl; Attendance: 5,997; Referee: Esfandiar Baharmast (United States)

24 July 1996 Summer Olympics Group B	Spain	3–2	Australia	Orlando, United States
	Raúl 40', 90'; Santi 86'	Report	Vidmar 3', 11'	Stadium: Citrus Bowl; Attendance: 12,050; Referee: Hugh Dallas (Great Britain)

=== 1997 ===
12 July International Friendly	Australia	2–0	South Africa	Canberra, Australia
	Emerton 33'; Gonzales 57'	Report		Stadium: Australian Institute of Sport; Attendance: Referee: Ben Williams (Australia)

12 July International Friendly	Australia	2–3	South Africa	Wollongong, Australia
	Salapisidis 34'; Allsopp 72'	Report	Salmon 10'; De Weber 22', 53'	Stadium: Brandon Park; Attendance: 4,058; Referee: Ben Williams (Australia)

=== 1998 ===
21 March International Friendly	Australia	2–1	Brazil	Sydney, Australia
	Emerton 6'; Curcija 69'	Report	Eriberto 31'	Stadium: Parramatta Stadium; Attendance: 20,069; Referee: Simon Micallef (Football Federation Australia)

24 March International Friendly	Australia	3–2	Brazil	Adelaide, Australia
	Zane 42'; Curcija 58'; Rizzo 79' (pen.)	Report	Antonio 11', 83'	Stadium: Hindmarsh Stadium; Attendance: 7,537; Referee: Eugene Brazzale (Football Federation Australia)

28 March International Friendly	Australia	2–1	Brazil	Perth, Australia
	Zane 14', 24'	Report	Edu 60'	Stadium: West Australian Cricket Arena; Attendance: 13,357; Referee: Brett Hugo (Football Federation Australia)

13 June International Friendly	Australia	1–0	New Zealand	Townsville, Australia
	Susa 3'	Report		Stadium: Malanda Dairy Farmers Stadium

17 June International Friendly	Australia	2–0	New Zealand	Lismore, Australia
	Curcija 52'; Emerton 70'	Report		Stadium: Oakes Oval; Attendance: 4,000

20 June International Friendly	Australia	4–0	New Zealand	Coffs Harbour, Australia
	Emerton 19'; Carle 24'; Zane 75'; Kolpak 80'	Report		Stadium: International Sports Stadium; Attendance: 4,400

21 July International Friendly	Chile	1–1	Australia
		Report	Emerton 60' (pen.)

July International Friendly	Argentina	0–1	Australia
		Report

25 November International Friendly	Australia	0–1	China	Sydney, Australia
		Report	Li Yi 52'	Stadium: Marconi Stadium; Attendance: 1,500; Referee: Simon Micallef (Australia)

=== 1999 ===
15 January International Friendly	Australia	0–1	South Korea	Morwell, Australia
		Report	Kwan-woo 17'	Stadium: Mobil Park; Referee: G. Connolly

22 January International Friendly	Australia	0–2	South Korea	Morwell, Australia
		Report	Seol 25'; Sinozic 89' (o.g.)	Stadium: Mobil Park; Referee: G. Connolly

12 May International Friendly	Japan	0–1	Australia	Urawa, Japan
		Report	Foxe 70'	Attendance: 15,000

20 June International Friendly	Singapore	0–5	Australia	Bishan, Singapore
		Report	Emerton 25'; Wehrman 40'; Curcija 55', 82'; Zane 57'	Stadium: Bishan Stadium; Attendance: 6,000

30 June International Friendly	New Zealand	0–2	Australia	Auckland, New Zealand
		Report	Zane 15', 44'	Stadium: North Harbour Stadium; Attendance: 5,000

3 July International Friendly	New Zealand	0–3	Australia	Christchurch, New Zealand
		Report	Zane 15'; Curcija 20'; Ayloff 44' (o.g.)	Stadium: Queen Elizabeth II Stadium; Attendance: 1,000; Referee: Brian Precious

7 September International Friendly	Kuwait	1–1	Australia	London, England
	Najem 68' (pen.)	Report	Rizzo 47'

15 September International Friendly	Tunisia	0–1	Australia	Tunis, Tunisia
		Report	Allsopp 15'

17 September International Friendly	Tunisia	1–1	Australia	Tunis, Tunisia
	(unknown) 89' (pen.)	Report	Curcija 43'
