= 1970 FIFA World Cup qualification (AFC and OFC) =

Tournament details
- Dates: 28 September – 14 December 1969
- Teams: 7 (from 3 confederations)

Tournament statistics
- Matches played: 13
- Goals scored: 32 (2.46 per match)
- Attendance: 181,511 (13,962 per match)
- Top scorer: (Australia) Tom McColl (4 goals)

The Asian and Oceanian (AFC and OFC) qualification rounds for the 1970 FIFA World Cup took place between 28 September and 14 December 1969. Seven teams – four from Asia, two from Oceania and one from Africa – entered the competition for one place at the finals in Mexico.

Rhodesia took part in the Asian and Oceanian section to prevent a boycott from other African teams who opposed the country's apartheid policies. Following pressure from the Fédération Internationale de Football Association (FIFA), the Football Association of Rhodesia reformed to be a multi-racial organisation and the national team included both black and white players during the competition.

Following three rounds of qualifying, Israel qualified for the FIFA World Cup for the first time after defeating Australia in the final round.

== Background ==
Teams from Asia first took part in qualification for the FIFA World Cup in 1934 when Mandatory Palestine entered. In 1938, the Dutch East Indies became the first team from Asia to qualify after their opponents Japan and the United States both withdrew. Asian teams had limited experience at the World Cup after only the Dutch East Indies in 1938, India in 1950, (Note: India qualified without playing a match but withdrew from the 1950 FIFA World Cup.) South Korea in 1954 and North Korea in 1966 had qualified for the finals.

Australia became the first team from Oceania to enter qualification for the FIFA World Cup by competing in qualification for the previous edition in 1966. They lost both qualifying matches against North Korea and failed to qualify.

Following Rhodesia's Unilateral Declaration of Independence in 1965, mandatory United Nations sanctions excluded athletes from the country from competing abroad. However, the Fédération Internationale de Football Association (FIFA) allowed Rhodesia to enter qualification for the 1970 FIFA World Cup. In order to prevent a boycott from other African nations opposed to the apartheid policies of Rhodesia, the country was placed in the Asian and Oceanian section. Following pressure from FIFA, Rhodesia fielded a multi-racial squad.

== Format ==
In the first round, the seven teams were drawn into two double round robin groups – one of three teams and one of four teams. The two group winners would then contest a two-legged tie to decide which team would qualify for the finals.

After Rhodesia were drawn into Group A, a number of their scheduled opponents refused to play them. As a compromise, FIFA decided that the remaining three teams would contest a double round robin and the group winner would then contest a two-legged play-off against Rhodesia in Mozambique for the place in the second round.

Group B was also amended after North Korea refused to play Israel and they were subsequently excluded by FIFA. As a result, Israel and New Zealand would, in effect, play a two-legged tie with both legs in Israel.

=== Participants ===
Africa

- Rhodesia

Asia

- Israel
- Japan
- North Korea
- South Korea

Oceania

- Australia
- New Zealand

== First round ==
=== Group A ===
==== First round ====
All matches were played in Seoul, South Korea. Australia advanced to the second round.

===== Table =====
Pos	Team	Pld	W	D	L	GF	GA	GD	Pts	Qualification
1	Australia	4	2	2	0	7	4	+3	6	Advance to Group A second round
2	South Korea	4	1	2	1	6	5	+1	4	
3	Japan	4	0	2	2	4	8	−4	2	

Updated to match(es) played on unknown. Source:

===== Matches =====
10 October 1969
19:30 KST (UTC+09)

Australia	3–1	Japan
McColl 5'; Ogi 68' (o.g.); Baartz 69'		Watanabe 11'

Dongdaemun Stadium, Seoul
Attendance: 3,513
Referee: Nice (Malaysia)

12 October 1969
16:30 KST (UTC+09)

South Korea	2–2	Japan
Kim Ki-bok 8'; Park Soo-il 39'		Miyamoto 34'; Kuwahara 50'

Dongdaemun Stadium, Seoul
Attendance: 21,128
Referee: Cheung Tang-Sun (Taiwan)

14 October 1969
19:30 KST (UTC+09)

South Korea	1–2	Australia
Lee Yi-woo 45'		Watkiss 37'; McColl 82'

Dongdaemun Stadium, Seoul
Attendance: 10,250
Referee: Suppiah (Singapore)

16 October 1969
18:30 KST (UTC+09)

Australia	1–1	Japan
McColl 39'		Miyamoto 4'

Dongdaemun Stadium, Seoul
Attendance: 1,359
Referee: Suvaree (Thailand)

18 October 1969
16:00 KST (UTC+09)

South Korea	2–0	Japan
Jeong Kang-ji 17', 40'

Dongdaemun Stadium, Seoul
Attendance: 9,264
Referee: Lee Kan Chi (Hong Kong)

20 October 1969
18:30 KST (UTC+09)

South Korea	1–1	Australia
Park Soo-il 35'		Baartz 58'

Dongdaemun Stadium, Seoul
Attendance: 9,676
Referee: Nice (Malaysia)

=== Second round ===
All matches were played in Lourenço Marques, Province of Mozambique. After both legs ended in draws, a play-off was organised to decide which team would advance to the final round. Goals from Willie Rutherford and Johnny Warren helped Australia to a 3–1 win in the play-off as they progressed.

Group A second round
Team 1	Agg.	Team 2	1st leg	2nd leg	Play-off
Rhodesia	1–1	Australia	1–1	0–0	1–3

==== First leg ====
23 November 1969

Rhodesia	1–1	Australia
Chalmers 63'		McColl 68'

Lourenço Marques, Province of Mozambique
Attendance: 3,540
Referee: Antonio Saldanha Ribeiro (Portugal)

==== Second leg ====
27 November 1969

Rhodesia	0–0	Australia

Lourenço Marques, Province of Mozambique
Attendance: 2,512
Referee: Antonio Saldanha Ribeiro (Portugal)

==== Play-off ====
29 November 1969

Rhodesia	1–3	Australia
Chalmers 49'		Rutherford 12'; Tigere 22' (o.g.); Warren 57'

Lourenço Marques, Province of Mozambique
Attendance: 11,066
Referee: Antonio Saldanha Ribeiro (Portugal)

=== Group B ===
All matches were played in Ramat Gan, Israel. Israel advanced to the second round.

==== Table ====
Pos	Team	Pld	W	D	L	GF	GA	GD	Pts	Qualification
1	Israel	2	2	0	0	6	0	+6	4	Advance to final round
2	New Zealand	2	0	0	2	0	6	−6	0	
3	North Korea	0	0	0	0	0	0	0	0	Withdrew

Updated to match(es) played on unknown. Source:

==== Matches ====
28 September 1969

Israel	4–0	New Zealand
Spiegler 48'; Spiegel 65'; Feigenbaum 72', 86'

Ramat Gan Stadium, Ramat Gan
Attendance: 26,669
Referee: Nassiri (Iran)

1 October 1969

New Zealand	2–0	Israel
		Spiegler 24'; Spiegel 38'

Ramat Gan Stadium, Ramat Gan
Attendance: 10,898
Referee: Nassiri (Iran)

== Final round ==
A goal from Giora Spiegel gave Israel a narrow lead after the first leg before Mordechai Spiegler's goal in Sydney 10 days later ultimately proved decisive and Israel qualified for the 1970 FIFA World Cup.

Final round
Team 1	Agg.	Team 2	1st leg	2nd leg
Israel	2–1	Australia	1–0	1–1

=== First leg ===
4 December 1969

Israel	1–0	Australia
Spiegel 18'

Ramat Gan Stadium, Ramat Gan
Attendance: 41,899
Referee: Ferdinand Marschall (Austria)

=== Second leg ===
14 December 1969

Australia	1–1	Israel
Watkiss 88'		Spiegler 79'

Sydney Sports Ground, Sydney
Attendance: 29,737
Referee: Ferdinand Marschall (Austria)

== Qualified teams ==
Israel qualified for the FIFA World Cup for the first time. As of 2026, it remains the only time Israel have qualified.

Team	Qualified as	Qualified on	Previous appearances in FIFA World Cup
Israel	Final round winners	14 December 1969	0 (debut)

== Goalscorers ==
There were 32 goals scored in 13 matches, for an average of 2.46 goals per match.

4 goals

- (Australia) Tom McColl

3 goals

- (Israel) Mordechai Spiegler

2 goals

- (Australia) Ray Baartz
- (Australia) Johnny Watkiss
- (Israel) Yehoshua Feigenbaum
- (Israel) Giora Spiegel
- (Japan) Teruki Miyamoto
- (Rhodesia) Bobby Chalmers
- (South Korea) Jeong Kang-ji
- (South Korea) Park Soo-il

1 goal

- (Australia) Willie Rutherford
- (Australia) Johnny Warren
- (Japan) Yasuyuki Kuwahara
- (Japan) Masashi Watanabe
- (South Korea) Kim Ki-bok
- (South Korea) Lee Yi-woo

1 own goal

- (Australia) David Zeman (playing against Israel)
- (Japan) Aritatsu Ogi (playing against Australia)
- (Rhodesia) Phillemon Tegire (playing against Australia)
