= Yuri Gavrilov =

Yuri Gavrilov may refer to:

- Juri Gavrilov (born 1993), Estonian footballer
- Yuri Gavrilov (bandy player), Russian bandy player
- Yuri Gavrilov (footballer, born 1953), Russian football manager
- Yuri Gavrilov (footballer, born 2002), Russian football player
- Yuri Gavrilov (geologist) (born1948), Soviet and Russian geologist
- Yuri Gavrilov (handballer) (1967–2021), Ukrainian handball player
- Yuri Gavrilov (orientalist) (1932–2010), Soviet and Russian orientlist
