= Newcastle Number 1 Sports Ground =

Sports ground in Newcastle, Australia

Coordinates: 32°55′53″S 151°45′48″E

No. 1 Sports Ground
- No. 1 Sports Ground
- Interactive map of No. 1 Sports Ground

Ground information
- Location: Newcastle, New South Wales
- Country: Australia
- Establishment: 1876
- Capacity: 10,000
- Owner: Newcastle District Cricket Association
- Operator: Cricket NSW
- Tenants: New South Wales; Newcastle City Sabres(1854-present) Newcastle City Australian Football Club (1883-present)
- End names
- Parry Street End; National Park End

International information
- First women's ODI: 3 February 2000: Australia v England
- Last women's ODI: 10 March 2009: Australia v South Africa
- As of 7 September 2020; Source: No. 1 Sports Ground

Newcastle Number 1 Sports Ground is a multi-use stadium located in Newcastle, New South Wales, and has a nominated capacity of approximately 10,000. It neighbours Newcastle Number 2 Sports Ground.

== Cricket ==
It is currently used mostly for cricket matches, located within National Park. The ground first hosted First-class cricket in 1981 when New South Wales played Queensland. Ground was for many years a stopover on the tour itinerary for many visiting teams as they faced the Northern New South Wales XI. In 1981/82 the ground was allocated a Sheffield Shield match when the SCG was unavailable, and healthy crowds saw No.1 then become host to at least one first-class fixture per year.

Newcastle District Cricket Association also use the Sports Ground for 1st grade matches. It is used primarily for the grand final held every March. In March 2009, Belmont DCC defeated Toronto Workers Kookaburras at the ground to win the premiership.

As of 2014, 20 First-class matches had been played at the ground, the last in 2009. The ground will play host to a match between New South Wales Blues against Western Australia Warriors in Sheffield Shield played from February 25 to 28.

The ground will receive a multi million-dollar upgrade in September 2020. The upgrade will consist of new concrete seating to be added to increase the seating capacity of the ground from 400 to 790 along the Parry St side of the ground, new lighting, drainage, a new fence and sightscreens, resurfacing and a new cricket square with the size of the playing field increased to cater for pre-season Australian Football League games. This will mean that the Newcastle City AFC will have to play at another venue, potentially Hawkins Oval, until No.1 reopens.

The venue could potentially host an AFL Women's fixture in 2022.

== Other uses ==
No. 1 Sports Ground is currently used for Australian rules football, cricket and rugby league and has been used for athletics, rugby union and association football at various times. It also hosts the local rugby league and Australian rules football grand finals each year, and is currently used as a home ground by the Newcastle City Australian rules football and cricket clubs.

=== International soccer matches ===
The stadium has also been used for three international friendly matches across three different decades all of which featured the Australia men's national soccer team. The first match was against India on 17 September 1938 which ended in a 4–1 victory for India.

17 September 1938	Australia	1–4	India	Newcastle
	Hughes (?)	Report	Rahim (?); Lumsden (?), 46' (pen.); Bhattacharya (?)	Stadium: Newcastle Sports Ground; Attendance: 9,000

7 June 1947	Australia	5–1	South Africa	Newcastle
	Date (?); Hughes (?); Kemp (?)	Report	Wilson (?)	Stadium: Newcastle Sports Ground; Attendance: 18,442; Referee: William McWilliams (Australia)

1 October 1955	Australia	1–4	South Africa	Newcastle
	Vairy 39'	Report	Hughes (?); Le Roux 9'	Stadium: Newcastle Sports Ground; Attendance: 2,937; Referee: G. Muir (Australia)

== Concerts ==
From 2018 onwards, concerts associated with the Supercars Championship motor racing event, the Newcastle 500, have been held at the venue. A Simple Minds concert took place on 24 November 2018 as part of their "Walk Between Worlds Tour", but a Kiss concert scheduled for 23 November 2019 as part of their One Last Kiss: End of the Road World Tour was cancelled along with the rest of the Australian/New Zealand tour dates.

== Attendance records ==
Top 5 Sports Attendance Records

No.	Date	Teams	Sport	Competition	Crowd
1	7 February 2007	New South Wales v. South Australia	Cricket	T20	10,652
2	12 March 2005	Sydney Swans v. Collingwood Magpies	Australian rules football	AFL (preseason)	5,002
3	24 October 2004	New South Wales v. Tasmania	Cricket	ING Cup	3,816
4	13 March 2004	Sydney Swans v. Essendon Bombers	Australian rules football	AFL (preseason)	3,405
5	18 March 2006	Sydney Swans v. St Kilda Saints	Australian rules football	AFL (preseason)	3,203

^{Last updated on 13 July 2014}
