= Park Soo-il (footballer, born 1944) =

South Korean footballer (1944–2008)

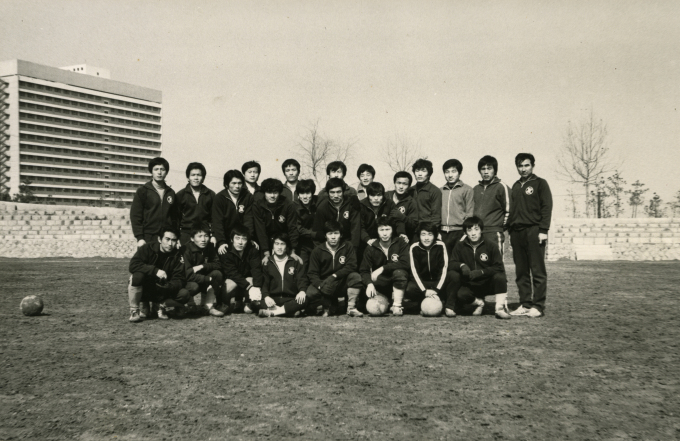
- The POSCO squad of 1973. Park is within the second row.

Personal information
- Full name: Park Soo-il
- Date of birth: April 25, 1944
- Place of birth: Keiki-dō, Korea, Empire of Japan
- Date of death: January 10, 2008 (aged 63)
- Place of death: Seoul, South Korea
- Height: 1.66 m (5 ft 5 in)
- Position: Forward

Youth career
- Hanyang Technical High School
- Kookmin University

Senior career*
Years	Team	Apps	(Gls)
1964–1966	Goldstar Textile		
1967–1969	→ ROK Marine Corps (draft)		
1969–1972	Korea Exchange Bank		
1973–1977	POSCO Atoms		

International career
1964	South Korea U20		
1965–1971	South Korea	21	(3)

Managerial career
- 1978–1980: POSCO Atoms (trainer)
- 1980–1985: POSCO Atoms (manager)
- 1986–1991: Soongsil University
- 1988: South Korea B
- 1992: Korean Universities Football Confederation
- 1992: Korean Universities (director)
- Korea Elementary School (vice president)
- 2000–2002: Pohang Steelers (talent scout)
- 2003–2008: Korea Football Association (director)
- * Club domestic league appearances and goals

- Park Soo-il
- Hangul: 박수일
- Hanja: 朴秀一
- RR: Bak Suil
- MR: Pak Suil

Park Soo-il (Korean: 박수일; April 25, 1944 – January 10, 2008) was a South Korean former footballer and football manager who played as a forward. He was known for his bold breakthrough and constant mobility to create decisive opportunities during his time as a player. In addition, during his tenure as head coach of Soongsil University, he coached several star players such as Choi Jin-cheul and is largely credited for converting Choi Jin-chul from a forward to a defender.

== Club career ==
Park was born in Keiki-dō during the Japanese colonial period and he would begin his football career by playing in Hanyang Technical High School and played in a friendly match between Thailand that won the 1962 AFC Youth Championship and Hanyang Technical High School. In 1964, he joined Goldstar Textile, and in 1965, he scored a hat-trick against the Army Quartermaster Football Club in the 1965 Korean National Semi-Professional Football League, helping the team win the championship together. During his career with Goldstar Textile, he would enroll in Kookmin University and would pursue his studies around the same time. In 1966, he participated in the JP Cup China-Japan Football Tournament as a member of the Seoul Selection Team, where he scored a goal against the Republic of China's Juguang team, helping his team win the tournament. He then participated in the OB All-Star Game for Hanyang Technical High School and Dongbuk High School in the same year.

He later joined the ROK Marine Corps in 1967 and was discharged from the Marine Corps in 1969 and transferred to the Korea Exchange Bank in 1970 by the Exchange Bank Football Council, where he scored against Singapore's military-police joint team and Japan's youth national team in the Southeast Asia tour. He also scored the equalizer in the third overtime against Korea Development Bank in the quarterfinals of the Korean National Football Championship that year, but the team failed to advance to the finals after losing to the Republic of Korea Army in the quarterfinals. Later, in the 1971 Prime Minister's Cup Finance Club Football Tournament, he scored several points to help the team win the tournament, but he was warned by the Korea Business Football Federation for his impolite behavior by arguing with spectators in the stands during a match against Seoul Trust Bank during the spring tournament of the National Business Football Federation. He went on to score several goals in the 1972 Prime Minister's Cup Finance Club Football Tournament, but the team failed to advance to the finals after losing to Korea Housing Bank in the quarterfinals, and in the Autumn Tournament of the National Business Football Federation, he scored against Kookmin Bank, but the team wouldn't make it to the finals.

Later, when POSCO FC was officially founded on May 3, 1973, Park joined as one of the original members, and he played an impressive role in the team's opening goal in the "Korea-Japan Friendship Business Football Tournament" against the Nippon Steel held to commemorate the completion of the steel mill that year. In the 1974 Korean President's Cup National Football Tournament, he assisted Lee Hoe-taik's winning goal in the final against Sungkyunkwan University, and shortly thereafter, Park participated in an exhibition game against the South Korea as a member of the "Unemployment All-Stars". Later, in the 1975 Spring Tournament of the National Business Football Federation, he assisted Ahn Ki-heon's extra goal against the ROK Air Force, helping POSCO win the tournament as well as scoring an extra goal against Nippon Steel in the Korea-Japan Friendship Football Tournament held in the same year. In addition, Park assisted Kim Ho's winning goal against Nonghyup FC in the fall tournament of the National Business Football Federation, but POSCO failed to win the championship, and after the end of the season, Park prepared for the next season without any plans to retire. In 1976, he assisted Choi Sang-chul's winning goal against Cho Hong Bank in the 1976 National Business Football Federation Autumn Tournament, but POSCO failed to advance to the finals after losing to Seoul Trust Bank in the quarterfinals, and in 1977, Park announced his retirement along with other founding players.

== International career ==
He participated in the 1964 AFC Youth Championship as a member of the South Korea national under-20 football team, scoring and taking a penalty kick to lead his team to a 2–0 win over Thailand, but the team lost to Malaysia in the quarter-finals. In the same year, he participated an exhibition game before the annual Merdeka Tournament of the year, which consisted of the South Korea national football B team, and performed well, but was not selected in the end.

In 1965, he helped his team win the first and second qualifiers before the 1966 FIFA World Cup qualifiers, and was included in the final roster due to his performances but did not play as the Korea Football Association decided not to participate in the qualifiers due to logistical concerns. He was also selected for the 1965 Merdeka Tournament, and made his official debut for the senior South Korea national football team on 14 August in the group match against Thailand. In 1966, he was shortlisted for the 1966 Merdeka Tournament, but was not selected, but would later appear in the roster for the 1966 Asian Games due to his impressive performance. However, he was found to have left the athletes' village without permission during the tournament and returned with a woman and was severely punished by the Korea Football Association with a two-year suspension, but it would be lifted a year later in 1967 by a decision of the Reward and Punishment Committee.

In 1969, he was injured during a trip to Europe, and after being named for the 1970 FIFA World Cup qualifiers, he assisted Jung Byung-tak's opening goal in an exhibition match against the South Korea national B team. He scored an extra goal in the first game against Japan, but the match ended in a 2–2 draw, and scored the opening goal in the second match against Australia shortly afterwards, but the team failed to qualify for the 1970 FIFA World Cup, ending in a 1–1 draw.

Later, in 1970, when the South Korea B team was established in accordance with the dualization principle of the Korean national team, Park Soo-il was included in the A team, and he played well in a friendly against Flamengo that took place shortly thereafter. He also impressed with his team's opening goal in an exhibition match against Olaria that year, and scored the opening goal in a friendly against B 1903. He then participated in the Merdeka Tournament in the same year, and assisted Seo Yun-chan's extra-time goal against Singapore. However, he was treated for stomach cramps before the quarterfinals against India, and was unable to play in the quarterfinals and the final against Burma. He also took part in a friendly against Benfica shortly afterwards, and in that year, when the dualization principle was abolished again and the national team was merged into one, Park was included in the reserve list for the national team. Despite this though, he was selected as a member of the national team for the final roster for the 1970 Asian Games, and scored the winning goal against Thailand to help South Korea win the tournament.

He was then included in the national team's 1971 roster for friendlies in Latin America, and scored the winning goal in an exhibition match against Argentina U-23. He also participated in the 1971 Korea Cup, and assisted Park Yi-cheon's winning goal against Thailand, helping the national team win the championship. Shortly thereafter, he scored the equalizer in a warm-up match against Dundee United, but was unable to prevent his team from losing, and was selected for the 1972 Summer Olympic Qualifiers in the same year. However, he was unable to play due to a foot injury, and was left out of the final roster for the 1972 King's Cup.

== Managerial career ==
In 1980, after retiring as a player, he was sent to West Germany as a trainer for his club of POSCO Atoms, and in 1981, he assisted Han Hong-ki as a coach of POSCO and led the team to victory in the Korean National Semi-Professional Football League. He took over as the team's head coach in 1982 when Cho Yoon-ok left the team, and won the Coaching Coach Award after leading the team to the National Unemployed Football Federation championship that year. He then coached the amateur team at the 1983 All-Star Game, and in 1985 he resigned after nearly 15 years as a player and coach with the club.

He was the head coach of Soongsil University from 1986 to 1991, and in 1992 he was appointed to the board of directors of the Korea Collegiate Football Federation. In 1988, he was appointed head coach of South Korea B and participated in the President's Cup international football tournament held in the same year, but the team failed to qualify for the tournament with three losses. In 1988, he participated in the 40th All-Star Game before the final of the National Football Championship.

He then served as vice president of the Korea Elementary School Football Federation, and served as a talent scout for the Pohang Steelers until 2002, notably recruiting Joško Jeličić. Since 2003, he has served as the director of the Korea Football Association and vice chairman of the Rewards and Punishment Committee, and in 2005 he ran unsuccessfully for president of the Korea High School Football Federation.

== Personal life ==
Park's daughter, Park Ji-a would later go on to become an actress.

In 2000, along with other players of Goldstar Textile, he promoted projects and events to commemorate Kim Yong-sik as a member of the SsangYong OB Association. In commemoration of the 33rd anniversary of the founding of Best Eleven in 2003, he was selected as one of the "55 People Who Graced the 100 Years of Korean Football" and was included in the "Best 11 of the 60s." In 2005, Park would request officials of the Korea Secondary Football Federation to hold the Korea Secondary Football Federation Spring Tournament in Pohang which would be granted.

In 2006, he participated in the Korea OB Branch Soccer Tournament. He also participated in a number of Kyung-Pyong Football Series as a member of the "Seoul OB Team". In 2006, he appeared on Munhwa Broadcasting Corporation in the video series "Korean Football Goes" before the 2006 FIFA World Cup. In 2007, he visited the National Intelligence Service along with other members of the Yangji Football Club and requested that they arrange a meeting with the North Korea national under-17 football team, who were in Seoul to participate in the 2007 FIFA U-17 World Cup. In 2005, Park would move from Pohang to Seoul before dying from pancreatic cancer on January 10, 2008.

== Career statistics ==
No	Date	Venue	Opponent	Score	Result	Competition
1.	October 12, 1969	Dongdaemun Stadium, Seoul, South Korea	Japan	2–1	2–2	1970 FIFA World Cup qualifiers
2.	October 20, 1969	Dongdaemun Stadium, Seoul, South Korea	Australia	1–1	1–1	1970 FIFA World Cup qualifiers
3.	December 15, 1970	Suphachalasai Stadium, Bangkok, Thailand	Thailand	2–0	2–1	1970 Asian Games

== Honors ==
=== As a player ===
==== Clubs ====
- Goldstar Textile
  - Korean National Football Championship (1): 1965
  - Korean National Semi-Professional Football League (3): Spring 1964, Fall 1964, Spring 1965
- ROK Marine Corps
  - Korean President's Cup National Football Tournament (1): 1969
- Korea Exchange Bank
  - Korean National Semi-Professional Football League: Spring 1971 (runners-up)
  - President's Cup Finance Team Tournament (1): 1971
  - Prime Minister's Cup Finance League (1): 1971
  - Prime Minister's Cup Finance Corps Football Tournament: 1969 (runners-up)
- POSCO Atoms
  - Korean President's Cup National Football Tournament (1): 1974
  - Korean National Football Championship (1): 1977
  - Korean National Semi-Professional Football League (1): Spring 1975
  - National Football Federation (1): 1977 (runners-up)
- South Korea
  - Asian Games (1): 1970 Asian Games
  - Merdeka Tournament (2): 1965, 1970
  - Korea Cup (1) 1971

=== As a Manager and Director ===
- POSCO Atoms
  - Korean Super League (1): 1985 (runners-up)
  - Korean National Semi-Professional Football League Winners (2): 1981 Fall, 1982
  - Korean National Football Championship (1): 1985 (runners-up)
  - Korean National Sports Festival (2): 1982 (runners-up), 1985 (winners)

=== Individual ===
- 1982 Korean National Semi-Professional Football League Managerial Award
