= Johnny Claassens =

South African footballer

Personal information
- Full name: John Henry Claassens
- Place of birth: Transvaal, South Africa

Senior career*
Years	Team	Apps	(Gls)
- Garrison (Pretoria)

International career
1947–1953	South Africa	10	(9)
- * Club domestic league appearances and goals

John Henry Claassens was a South African soccer player. He featured in a number of games for the South Africa national soccer team between 1947 and 1953, scoring nine times in ten appearances.

== Career statistics ==
=== International ===
Appearances and goals by national team and year
National team	Year	Apps	Goals
South Africa	1947	5	4
South Africa	1950	4	5
South Africa	1953	1	0
Total		10	9

=== International goals ===
Scores and results list South Africa's goal tally first.

No	Date	Venue	Opponent	Score	Result	Competition
1.	31 May 1947	Sydney Showground Stadium, Sydney, Australia	Australia	?–?	3–3	Friendly
2.	31 May 1947	Sydney Showground Stadium, Sydney, Australia	Australia	?–?	3–3	Friendly
3.	12 July 1947	Athletic Park, Wellington, New Zealand	New Zealand	?–?	8–3	Friendly
4.	12 July 1947	Athletic Park, Wellington, New Zealand	New Zealand	?–?	8–3	Friendly
5.	24 June 1950	Kingsmead, Durban, South Africa	Australia	1–0	3–2	Friendly
6.	24 June 1950	Kingsmead, Durban, South Africa	Australia	3–2	3–2	Friendly
7.	1 July 1950	Ellis Park Stadium, Johannesburg, South Africa	Australia	1–0	2–1	Friendly
8.	1 July 1950	Ellis Park Stadium, Johannesburg, South Africa	Australia	2–0	2–1	Friendly
9.	8 July 1950	St George's Park, Port Elizabeth, South Africa	Australia	1–0	1–2	
