= David Cliss =

English footballer

Personal information
- Full name: David Laurence Cliss
- Date of birth: 15 November 1939 (age 86)
- Place of birth: Enfield, England
- Position: Inside forward

Youth career
- Chelsea

Senior career*
Years	Team	Apps	(Gls)
1957–1962	Chelsea	24	(1)
- Guildford City
1967–1971	St. George-Budapest		
- * Club domestic league appearances and goals

David Laurence Cliss (born 15 November 1939) is an English former professional footballer who played as an inside forward.

== Career ==
Born in Enfield, Cliss played club football in England and Australia for Chelsea, Guildford City and St. George-Budapest.
