= Australia men's national under-23 soccer team results (2020–present) =

Australia under-23 association football results

This is a list of the Australia national under-23 soccer team results from 2020 to the present day.

== 2020s ==
=== 2020 ===
8 January 2020 AFC U-23 Championship Group A	Iraq	1–1	Australia	Rangsit, Thailand
	Nassif 77'	Report	Piscopo 62'	Stadium: Thammasat Stadium; Attendance: 106; Referee: Fu Ming (China)

11 January 2020 AFC U-23 Championship Group A	Australia	2–1	Thailand	Bangkok, Thailand
	D'Agostino 43', 76'	Report	Anon 24'	Stadium: Rajamangala Stadium; Attendance: 22,352; Referee: Turki Al-Khudhayr (Saudi Arabia)

14 January 2020 AFC U-23 Championship Group A	Australia	1–1	Bahrain	Rangsit, Thailand
	Najjarine 34'	Report	Marhoon 45+3'	Stadium: Thammasat Stadium; Attendance: 123; Referee: Mohammed Abdulla Hassan Mohamed (United Arab Emirates)

18 January 2020 AFC U-23 Championship Quarter-finals	Australia	1–0	Syria	Bangkok, Thailand
	Toure 101'	Report		Stadium: Rajamangala Stadium; Attendance: 214; Referee: Ryuji Sato (Japan)

22 January 2020 AFC U-23 Championship Semi-finals	Australia	0–2	South Korea	Rangsit, Thailand
		Report	Dae-won 56'; Dong-gyeong 76'	Stadium: Thammasat Stadium; Attendance: 789; Referee: Nawaf Shukralla (Bahrain)

25 January 2020 AFC U-23 Championship Third Place	Australia	1–0	Uzbekistan	Bangkok, Thailand
	D'Agostino 47'	Report		Stadium: Rajamangala Stadium; Attendance: 590; Referee: Mohammed Abdulla Hassan Mohamed (United Arab Emirates)

=== 2021 ===
2 June International Friendly	Australia	1–2	Republic of Ireland	Marbella, Spain
	Najjarine 74'	Report	Rich-Baghuelou 57' (o.g.); Tierney 90'	Stadium: Estadio Municipal de Marbella; Referee: Enrique Pareja Nieto (Spain)

8 June International Friendly	Australia	0–1	Romania	Marbella, Spain
		Report	Ganea 10'	Stadium: Estadio Municipal de Marbella; Referee: Fernando Narváez de Vera (Spain)

12 June International Friendly	Australia	2–3	Mexico	Marbella, Spain
	Arzani 31' (pen.), 50'	Report	A. Angulo 33'; Álvarez 60'; Aguirre 75'	Stadium: Estadio Municipal de Marbella; Referee: Guillermo Paradas Mazuela (Spain)

12 July International Friendly	Australia	0–2	New Zealand	Ichihara, Japan
19:00 UTC+10		Report	Wood 55' (pen.); Just 83'	Stadium: ZA Oripri Stadium

15 July International Friendly	Australia	1–0	New Zealand	Ichihara, Japan
19:00 UTC+10	Duke 3'	Report		Stadium: ZA Oripri Stadium; Attendance: 0

22 July 2020 Summer Olympics Group C	Argentina	0–2	Australia	Sapporo, Japan
19:30 UTC+9		Report	Wales 14'; Tilio 80'	Stadium: Sapporo Dome; Attendance: 0 (Note: Due to the COVID-19 pandemic in Japan, the match was played behind closed doors.); Referee: Srđan Jovanović (Serbia)

25 July 2020 Summer Olympics Group C	Australia	0–1	Spain	Sapporo, Japan
19:30 UTC+9		Report	Oyarzabal 81'	Stadium: Sapporo Dome; Attendance: 0 Referee: Bamlak Tessema Weyesa (Ethiopia)

28 July 2020 Summer Olympics Group C	Australia	0–2	Egypt	Rifu, Japan
20:00 UTC+9		Report	Rayan 44'; Hamdy 85'	Stadium: Miyagi Stadium; Attendance: 0 Referee: Artur Soares Dias (Portugal)

26 October 2022 AFC U-23 Asian Cup qualification Group G	Indonesia	2–3	Australia	Dushanbe, Tajikistan
17:00 UTC+5	Sulaeman 68'; Hidayat 84'	Report	Tokich 53'; Wood 59'; Italiano 77'	Stadium: Central Republican Stadium; Attendance: 0 (Note: Due to the COVID-19 pandemic in Tajikistan, the match was played behind closed doors.); Referee: Kim Woo-sung (South Korea)

29 October 2022 AFC U-23 Asian Cup qualification Group G	Australia	1–0	Indonesia	Dushanbe, Tajikistan
17:00 UTC+5	Wood 10'	Report		Stadium: Central Republican Stadium; Attendance: 0 Referee: Khalid Al-Turais (Saudi Arabia)

=== 2022 ===
1 June 2022 AFC U-23 Asian Cup Group B	Australia	2–0	Kuwait	Qarshi, Uzbekistan
18:00 UTC+5	D'Arrigo 26'; Rich-Baghuelou 54'	Report		Stadium: Markaziy Stadium; Attendance: 675; Referee: Adel Al-Naqbi (United Arab Emirates)

4 June 2022 AFC U-23 Asian Cup Group B	Iraq	1–1	Australia	Qarshi, Uzbekistan
18:00 UTC+5	Abdulkareem 56'	Report	Kuol 45+2'	Stadium: Markaziy Stadium; Attendance: 492; Referee: Akhrol Riskullaev (Uzbekistan)

7 June 2022 AFC U-23 Asian Cup Group B	Australia	1–0	Jordan	Tashkent, Uzbekistan
18:00 UTC+5	Najjarine 61' (pen.)	Report		Stadium: Lokomotiv Stadium; Attendance: 164; Referee: Yudai Yamamoto (Japan)

11 June 2022 AFC U-23 Asian Cup Quarter-finals	Australia	1–0	Turkmenistan	Tashkent, Uzbekistan
18:00 UTC+5	Orazow 74' (o.g.)	Report		Stadium: Milliy Stadium; Attendance: 247; Referee: Salman Ahmad Falahi (Qatar)

15 June 2022 AFC U-23 Asian Cup Semi-finals	Australia	0–2	Saudi Arabia	Tashkent, Uzbekistan
18:00 UTC+5		Report	Al-Eisa 20'; Yahya 72'	Stadium: Pakhtakor Stadium; Attendance: 323; Referee: Mohanad Qasim Sarray (Iraq)

18 June 2022 AFC U-23 Asian Cup Third place play-off	Japan	3–0	Australia	Tashkent, Uzbekistan
18:00 UTC+5	Sato 7'; Trewin 39' (o.g.); Fujio 63'	Report		Stadium: Pakhtakor Stadium; Attendance: 230; Referee: Kim Hee-gon (South Korea)
