= Ian Palmer (soccer, fl. 1955) =

South African footballer

International career
Years	Team	Apps	(Gls)
1955	South Africa	4	(4)

Ian Palmer was a South African soccer player. He played in four games for the South Africa national soccer team in 1955, scoring four times.

== Career statistics ==
=== International ===
Appearances and goals by national team and year
National team	Year	Apps	Goals
South Africa	1955	4	4
Total		4	4

=== International goals ===
Scores and results list South Africa's goal tally first.

No	Date	Venue	Opponent	Score	Result	Competition
1.	3 September 1955	Cricket Ground, Brisbane, Australia	Australia	?–0	3–0	Friendly
2.	10 September 1955	Olympic Park Stadium, Melbourne, Australia	Australia	1–0	2–0	Friendly
3.	17 September 1955	Kensington Oval, Adelaide, Australia	Australia	?–0	8–0	Friendly
4.	24 September 1955	Cricket Ground, Sydney, Australia	Australia	?–0	6–0	Friendly
