= John Duffy (footballer, born 1943) =

Scottish footballer

Personal information
- Full name: John Duffy
- Date of birth: 6 September 1943
- Place of birth: Dunfermline, Scotland
- Position: Left half

Youth career
- –: Hill of Beath Hawthorn

Senior career*
| Years | Team | Apps | (Gls) |
| 1959–1961 | Raith Rovers | 7 | (0) |
| 1961–1963 | Dunfermline Athletic | 5 | (0) |
| 1963–1964 | Darlington | 10 | (1) |
| 1965 | Slavia Melbourne | | |
| 1966–1967 | Sydney Hakoah | | |
- * Club domestic league appearances and goals

John Duffy (born 6 September 1943) is a Scottish former footballer who played as a left half in the Scottish League for Raith Rovers and Dunfermline Athletic and in the English Football League for Darlington. He then played in the Victoria State League for Slavia Melbourne and for Sydney Hakoah in New South Wales Division 1, earning representative honours for both states.
