= Hanyang Technical High School =

- 한양공업고등학교

Location
- Sindang 1(il)-dong, 251, 299 Eulji-ro, Jung-gu, 04566; Seoul; South Korea; 37.565854525439306°N 127.01198705767285°E

Information
- Former name: Hanyang Industrial Middle School
- Type: Private Vocational School
- Motto: 근면ㆍ정직 ㆍ겸손ㆍ봉사 (Diligence, Honesty, Humility, Service)
- Religious affiliation: Non-denominational
- Established: 1 September 1945
- Founder: Dr. Kim Yeon-jun
- School board: Seoul Metropolitan Office of Education
- School district: Yeongsan-gu
- Authority: Korean Ministry of Education
- Principal: Kim Kwan-hoon
- Staff: 100 (as at 2010)
- Gender: Mixed
- Enrollment: Approx. 1000
- Language: Korean
- Campus type: Urban
- Colors: Indigo blue, sky blue, white
- Mascot: Lion and dove
- Newspaper: Hanyang News
- Affiliation: Hanyang Foundation
- Website: hanyang.sen.hs.kr

Hanyang Technical High School (한양공업고등학교) is a private vocational school in Seoul, South Korea. Located in Jung District, the school was founded on 1 September 1945 by Kim Yeon-jun as Hanyang Industrial Middle School. It is affiliated with the Hanyang Foundation and operates under the Seoul Metropolitan Office of Education.

The school provides technical and vocational education through divisions including smart construction information, digital architecture, smart convergence machinery, digital electronics, automotive studies, and computer networking. Its motto is "Diligence, Honesty, Humility, Service".

== History ==
- September 1, 1945 - School founded by Dr Kim Yeon-jun (1st Principal) as Hanyang Industrial Middle School
- June 14, 1961 - Kim Young-jae appointed 2nd Principal
- April 28, 1986 - Yeom Sing-bin appointed 3rd Principal
- September 1, 1989 - Baek Nam-gun appointed 4th Principal
- February 2, 2002 - Lee Jong-geuk appointed 5th Principal
- March 2, 2003 - Kang Moon-seok appointed 6th Principal
- May 20, 2005 - 60th anniversary of the school's founding
- March 4, 2013 - Chae Sung-bum appointed 7th Principal
- April 25, 2014 - 40th Anniversary of the twinning relationship between Hanyang and Jiben Academy (Japan)
- December 31, 2018 - Hanyang receives a commendation from the Seoul Metropolitan Office of Education for promotion of student voluntary activities
- October 25, 2019 - Seoul Central Police Station awards Hanyang as best School Violence Prevention program
- March 2, 2021 - Kim Kwan-hoon appointed 8th Principal

== Divisions ==
- Smart Construction Information
- Digital Architecture
- Smart Convergence Machinery
- Digital Electronics
- Automotive
- Computer Networking

== Extra-Curricular Activities and Clubs ==
- Football
- Brass Band
- Broadcasting Station
- Climbing
- Red Cross Youth
- Dance Club ("Against")
- Student Newspaper
- Mindgear (Traditional Counselling Club)
- Start-up Club
- After-school education classes

== Notable alumni ==
- Kim Hyun-joong (Singer/Actor)
- Lee Hae-bum (Firefighter)
- Lee Kwan-woo (Football player)
- Park Eui-jeong (Football player)
- Yoo Chun-hee (Firefighter)
