= Paddy Breslin =

New Zealand footballer

Personal information
- Full name: Patrick J Breslin
- Place of birth: New Zealand
- Date of death: 19 July 2020
- Position: Forward

Senior career*
| Years | Team | Apps | (Gls) |
- Kiwi United

International career
| 1967–1968 | New Zealand | 2 | (1) |
- * Club domestic league appearances and goals

Paddy Breslin is a former association football player who represented New Zealand at international level.

Breslin played two official A-international matches for the New Zealand, both against New Caledonia, the first a 0–4 loss on 8 November 1967, the second a 1–3 loss on 8 October 1968, Breslin scoring New Zealand's goal in that game.

Breslin died on 19 July 2020.
