= Joe Bacak =

Australian soccer player (born 1973)

Personal information
- Full name: Josip Bacak
- Date of birth: 23 May 1973 (age 53)
- Position: Midfielder

Senior career*
Years	Team	Apps	(Gls)
1989–1990	Melbourne Knights	1	(0)
1991	St Albans Saints	21	(5)
1991–1994	Melbourne Knights	19	(0)
1994–1996	Sydney Olympic	28	(5)
1995–1996	Melbourne Knights	5	(0)
1996–1997	Vitesse Arnhem	6	(0)
1999–2000	Hertha Berlin		
2000–2001	Ethnikos Asteras	4	(0)
2001–2002	South Melbourne	16	(3)
2000	St Albans Saints	15	(3)

International career
1996	Australia U23	2	(3)
- * Club domestic league appearances and goals

Josip Bacak is an Australian former soccer player.

== Playing career ==
=== Club career ===
Bacak played for a number of Australian teams, starting with Melbourne Knights FC in the National Soccer League in 1989.

Bacak spent the 2000/2001 season with Greek first division team Ethnikos Asteras, playing four matches.

=== International career ===
Bacak played two matches for the Australian under-23 team in January 1996, scoring three goals. His three goals all came in one match against Vanuatu in Adelaide.
