= Willie Rutherford =

Australian football player

Personal information
- Date of birth: 19 January 1945
- Place of birth: Lochgelly, Fife, Scotland
- Date of death: 24 October 2010 (aged 65)
- Place of death: Perth, Western Australia, Australia
- Position: Forward

Youth career
- Methil Youth Club

Senior career*
Years	Team	Apps	(Gls)
1965–1968	East Fife	27	(11)
1968	Forfar Athletic	5	(5)
- Sydney Hakoah
1973–1974	Kwong Wah	14	(8)

International career
1969	Australia	6	(1)
- * Club domestic league appearances and goals

William MacDonald Rutherford (19 January 1945 – 24 October 2010) was an Australian soccer player.

== Playing career ==
=== Club career ===
Rutherford played youth football for Methil before signing with East Fife where he made 27 league appearances, scoring 11 goals. In the late 1960s he moved to Forfar Athletic where he made only five appearances before emigrating to Australia.

Arriving in Australia in 1968, Rutherford joined Sydney Hakoah, where he played in several stints until the mid-1970s. He also played in Hong Kong during the Australian off-season.

While playing for Hakoah, he played for the state of New South Wales three times. During his time with the club he was noted as a mercurial, unpredictable but undeniably brilliant player, rated by some as Sydney’s most valuable forward.

Rutherford was a very fast runner who took up professional running with some success in the 1970s.

=== International career ===
Rutherford played six times for the Australia national team. All of his matches were played in 1969 during Australia's failed qualification for the 1970 FIFA World Cup.

== Outside Football ==
A building industry supervisor, Rutherford married once and later divorced. He and his former wife had one son.
