= Peter Fuzes =

Australian soccer player

Personal information
- Date of birth: 14 May 1947 (age 79)
- Position: Goalkeeper

International career
Years	Team	Apps	(Gls)
- Australia

Peter Fuzes (born 14 May 1947) is an Australian former association soccer player. Fuzes played as a goalkeeper, and represented the national Socceroos.

== Early life ==
Fuzes is Jewish. He emigrated to Australia in 1957 from Hungary as a refugee. He attended Sydney University.

== Playing career ==
=== Club career ===
Fuzes began his senior club career for Hakoah in the New South Wales State League in 1965. He played for Hakoah until 1971. In 1972, he transferred to APIA Leichhardt. He stayed at APIA for two seasons before moving to Western Suburbs for the 1974 season. During the 1974 season he again transferred, this time to Canterbury. In 1975, he moved to St George.

=== International career ===
Fuzes played two matches for Australia against Scotland in 1967.

== Hall of Fame ==
In 2003 he was inducted into the Maccabi NSW Hall of Fame.

== See also ==
- List of select Jewish association football players
