= Alan Marnoch =

Australian soccer player (1945–2021)

Allan Marnoch
Personal information
- Date of birth: 6 April 1944
- Place of birth: Scotland
- Date of death: 8 March 2021 (aged 75)
- Position: Defender

Senior career*
Years	Team	Apps	(Gls)
1964–1975	Sydney Hakoah		

International career
1967–1969	Australia	14	(0)
- * Club domestic league appearances and goals

Allan Marnoch (6 April 1944 – 8 March 2021) was an Australian soccer player who played for Sydney Hakoah in the New South Wales State League and represented Australia 14 times between 1967 and 1969.

== Early life ==
Marnoch was born in Scotland, emigrating to Australia as a teenager.

== Playing career ==
After spending time with Lochgelly Albert, Thornton Hibs and being on the books of Dunfermline Athletic, Marnoch signed with Hakoah in Sydney.

Marnoch made his international debut for Australia against Scotland in 1967.

In 1969, Marnoch was one of a number of players whose eligibility was challenged by South Korea on the basis that he was playing for Australia as a British subject, rather than as an Australian citizen.

His international career came to an end after he was unable to get leave from his employment and his spot was taken by Peter Wilson.

== Honours ==
=== Player ===
Hakoah

- Australia Cup: 1965, 1968
- NSW State League Premiers: 1968, 1970, 1971, 1973, 1974
- NSW Federation Cup: 1965

Individual

- Football Federation Australia Men's Team of the Decade: 1963–1970
