= Yuri Gavrilov (handballer) =

Ukrainian handball player (1967–2021)

Personal information
- Full name: Yuriy Anatoliyovich Gavrilov
- Nationality: Ukrainian
- Born: 27 February 1967 Donetsk, Soviet Union
- Died: 6 May 2021 (aged 54) Luxembourg City

Sport
- Sport: Handball
- Position: Right wing

Youth career
- Years: Team
- –1985: Spartak Donetsk

Senior clubs
- Years: Team
- 1985–1992: SKA Kiev
- 1992–1994: Tevcr (Spain)
- 1996–2001: HB Dudelange
- 2001–2004: Handball Käerjeng
- 2004–2005: HB Pétange
National team
- Years: Team
- 1990–1992: Soviet Union
- 1992–1994: Ukraine
Medal record
Men's handball
Representing Soviet Union
World Championships
Silver medal – second place	1990 Czechoslovakia	Team
Representing the Unified Team
Olympic Games
Gold medal – first place	1992 Barcelona	Team

Yuriy Anatoliyovich Gavrilov (Ukrainian: Юрій Анатолійович Гаврилов, Yuriy Anatoliyovych Havrylov, 27 February 1967 in Donetsk – 6 May 2021 in Luxembourg) was a Ukrainian handball player who competed for the Unified Team in the 1992 Summer Olympics.

== Handball career ==
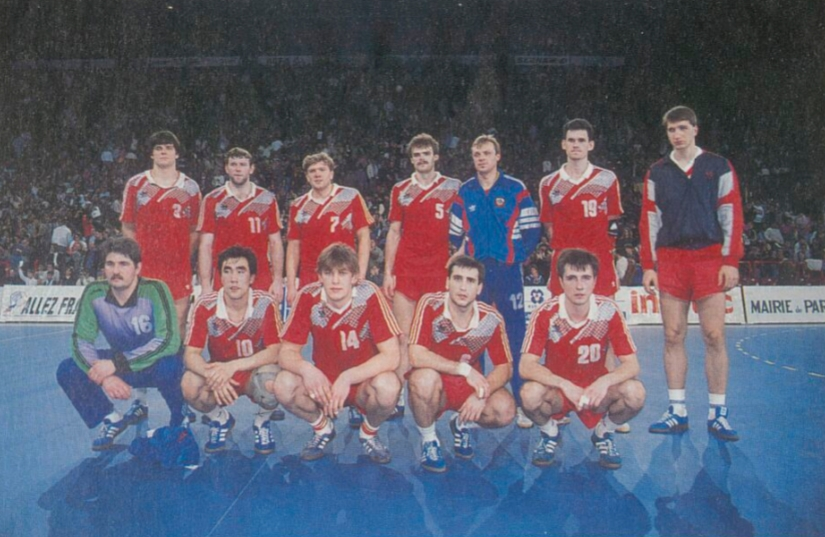
The CIS team in 1992

He won the gold medal with the Unified Team. The Lieutenant of the Reserves Yuriy Havrylov represented the Ukrainian Armed Forces. He played all seven matches and scored 19 goals. He was elected Man of the Match in the final game against Sweden.

From 1992 to 1996 he played for two different Spanish handball clubs, SD Teucro and Tevcr.

In 1996 he moved with his family to Luxembourg and played for the HB Dudelange from 1997 to 2000–01, with whom he won in 1999 La Coupe du Luxembourg as player and as the women's head coach won in 1998 La coupe du Luxembourg.

After 2001 he competed for four more years for the HB Kaerjeng and HB Peiteng.

== Private ==
After his retirement from Handball he worked and lived in Luxembourg.

Upon his death, the former teams he competed for in the Former Soviet Union, Ukraine, Spain and Luxembourg as well as the Ukrainian Handball Association and the International Handball Federation paid their tributes to him.
