= Daniel Le Roux =

South African soccer player

Personal information
- Full name: Daniel Leow Le Roux
- Date of birth: 25 November 1933
- Place of birth: Port Shepstone, South Africa
- Date of death: August 2016 (aged 82)
- Position: Winger

Senior career*
Years	Team	Apps	(Gls)
1950	Berea		
1951–1956	Queen's Park (Durban)		
1957–1958	Arsenal	5	(0)
1959–1961	Durban City	?	(?)
1962–1965	Durban United	?	(?)
1966	Addington	?	(?)
1967–1968	Durban City	?	(?)
1970	Maritzburg	?	(?)

International career
1954–1955	South Africa	6	(2)
- * Club domestic league appearances and goals

Daniel Leow Le Roux (25 November 1933 - August 2016) was a South African former footballer who played as a winger.

== Pre-football career ==
He was born in Port Shepstone, Natal. He was a bank clerk before he took up football.

== Career ==
Le Roux played for Queen's Park in his native South Africa before signing for English First Division team Arsenal in February 1957. He made five Football League appearances in the 1957–58 season before returning to South Africa to play for Durban City.

== Arsenal ==
He made his debut on 7 December 1957 in a 2-1 loss to Burnley where he played as an outside right. His teammate Jim Standen was also a debutant.
