= Cliff van Blerk =

Australian soccer player (1938–2018)

Personal information
- Full name: Clifford van Blerk
- Date of birth: 30 December 1938
- Place of birth: Bulawayo, Southern Rhodesia
- Date of death: 7 June 2018 (aged 79)
- Place of death: New South Wales, Australia
- Position: Defender

Senior career*
Years	Team	Apps	(Gls)
1965–1968	APIA Leichhardt		
1969	Western Suburbs		
1974	Melita Eagles		
1975	Riverstone		

International career^{‡}
1967	Australia	2	(0)

Managerial career
- 1975: Riverstone
- * Club domestic league appearances and goals as of 24 June 2009 ‡ National team caps and goals as of 24 June 2009

Cliff van Blerk (30 December 1938 – 7 June 2018) was an Australian football (soccer) player. He is the father of former footballer Jason van Blerk; they were the third father-son combination to play for the Australian national football team.
