= Garry Manuel =

Australian soccer player

Personal information
- Full name: Garry Manuel
- Date of birth: 20 February 1950 (age 76)
- Position: Striker

Senior career*
Years	Team	Apps	(Gls)
1964	Prague		
1969	Prague		
1974	Pan Hellenic		

International career^{‡}
1967	Australia U23	2	(2)
1969–1975	Australia	4	(0)
- * Club domestic league appearances and goals as of 15 July 2007 ‡ National team caps and goals as of 15 July 2007

Garry Manuel (born 20 February 1950) is a former football (soccer) forward. He was a member of the 1974 World Cup squad in West Germany and represented Australia six times in total for one goal between 1969 and 1975. Manuel played for Prague and Pan Hellenic in NSW and represented the state on several occasions.
