= Archie Blue =

Scottish-born Australian association football player (1940–2026)

Personal information
- Full name: Archibald Blue
- Date of birth: 8 April 1940
- Place of birth: Glasgow, Scotland
- Date of death: 12 November 2026 (aged 86)
- Position: Forward

Youth career
- Royal Albert

Senior career*
Years	Team	Apps	(Gls)
1960–1961	Heart of Midlothian	0	(0)
1961–1962	Exeter City	34	(6)
1962	Carlisle United	2	(1)
- Footscray JUST
- APIA

International career
1965–1968	Australia	10	(4)
1965	Australia B	2	(0)
- * Club domestic league appearances and goals

Archibald Blue (8 April 1940 – 12 November 2026) was a Scottish-born Australian footballer who played as a centre forward who played in Scotland, England and Australia. After playing youth football in Scotland and spending time with Heart of Midlothian, he moved to England, playing in the Football League with Carlisle United during the early 1960s. Following a move to Australia, he played for Footscray JUST and APIA. He represented Australia 10 times.

== Club career ==
Blue was born in Glasgow and played in his youth with Royal Albert. He moved to senior football with Heart of Midlothian, but did not play a league game for them.

He then transferred to Exeter City and played for them between 1961 and 1962, before a transfer to Carlisle United for the 1962–63 season, making two appearances for the club.

Blue then moved to Australia and played for the Footscray JUST club, and later APIA.

== International career ==
Blue was capped by the Australia national team on 12 occasions, 10 in full internationals, and scored 4 goals, including a hat-trick in a 3–1 victory over China in 1965.

== Death ==
Blue died on 12 November 2026, at the age of 86.
