= Ray Baartz =

Australian former soccer player

Personal information
- Full name: Raymond Henry Baartz
- Date of birth: 6 March 1947 (age 79)
- Place of birth: Newcastle, New South Wales, Australia
- Height: 5 ft 10 in (1.78 m)
- Position: Striker

Youth career
- 1963: Adamstown Rosebuds
- 1963–1965: Manchester United

Senior career*
Years	Team	Apps	(Gls)
1966–1974	Sydney Hakoah	236	(211)

International career^{‡}
1967–1974	Australia	48	(18)
- * Club domestic league appearances and goals as of 25 August 2007 ‡ National team caps and goals as of 25 August 2007

Raymond Henry Baartz (born 6 March 1947) is an Australian former soccer player who played as a forward. He represented Australia 48 times between 1967 and 1974, scoring 18 goals, making him the nation's eighth-highest goal scorer of all time.

Baartz was born in Newcastle, New South Wales and spent his early years playing for Adamstown. At 17 he joined Manchester United and after 6 months signed on a two-year contract. In 1966 he returned to Australia and transferred to Sydney Hakoah for a then Australian record of £5600. He played 236 club matches scoring 211 goals.

Baartz was selected in the Australian squad to play in the World Cup finals in 1974 but his career was prematurely ended after he was felled by a blow from Uruguay's Luis Garisto (known as el Loco (in English crazy)) in a friendly international fixture at the Sydney Cricket Ground. The blow to his throat had damaged his carotid artery.

Ray currently still lives in Newcastle.

== Awards and recognition ==
Baartz was inducted into the Sport Australia Hall of Fame in 1985.

Baartz Terrace in the Sydney suburb of Glenwood is named for him.

On 5 December 2000, Baartz was awarded the Australian Sports Medal for services to soccer.

On 12 July 2012, Baartz was named in the Greatest ever Australian team.
