= Alan Westwater =

Australian footballer (1946–2024)

Personal information
- Full name: George Alan Westwater
- Date of birth: 26 March 1946
- Place of birth: Bridge of Allan, Scotland
- Date of death: 27 June 2024 (aged 78)
- Place of death: Denny, Scotland
- Position: Midfielder

Senior career*
Years	Team	Apps	(Gls)
1962	Canterbury-Marrickville		
1963–1966	Stirling Albion	41	(8)
1966–1968	Pan Hellenic		

International career
1967–1968	Australia	14	(2)
- * Club domestic league appearances and goals

George Alan Westwater (26 March 1946 – 27 June 2024) was a Scottish-Australian soccer player. He was named in the Football Federation Australia's "Team of the Decade" for the period 1963–1970 as a midfielder.

== Early life ==
Westwater was born in Bridge of Allan in Scotland. His father Willie was a footballer for Morton F.C. in Scottish Division A. The Westwaters moved to Australia in 1957 when Willie transferred to Bankstown in Sydney.

== Club career ==
In 1962, as a 16-year-old, Westwater made his debut for Canterbury-Marrickville in the New South Wales State League as an active right-side midfielder. During his first season both he and his father played in the state league.

In 1963 the Canterbury club raised £500 to enable the 17-year-old Westwater to try his luck in Scotland for the 1963–64 season. A condition imposed by the club was that Westwater had to play with them on his return to Sydney for two years. He tried out with the Rangers but ended up signing with Stirling Albion on 31 August 1963. After three seasons he returned to Sydney, Australia to play for Pan Hellenic.

== International career ==
Westwater's composure in midfield and willingness to join in attack earned Westwater his international debut for Australia in 1967 against Scotland. He scored his first international goal against Singapore in November 1967 and scored his second goal ten days later against Singapore. He played the last of his 14 international matches in April 1968 against Japan in Adelaide.

== Death ==
Westwater died in Denny, Falkirk on 27 June 2024, at the age of 78.

== Honours ==
Canterbury Bankstown

- NSW Federation Cup runner-up: 1962

Australia

- South Vietnam Independence Cup: 1967

Individual
In December 2013 Westwater was named in the Football Federation Australia "Team of the Decade" for the period 1963–1970.
