= FA Youth Cup Finals of the 1950s =

List of English football matches

FA Youth Cup Finals from 1953 to 1959.

== 1952–53: Manchester United vs. Wolverhampton Wanderers (7–1 and 2–2, 9–3 aggregate) ==
=== First leg ===
4 May 1953

Manchester United	7–1	Wolverhampton Wanderers
McFarlane 3', 48'; Lewis 6', 58'; Pegg 16'; Scanlon 73'; Whelan 83'		Smith 5'

Old Trafford, Manchester
Attendance: 20,934

Note: Flags indicate national team as defined under FIFA eligibility rules; some limited exceptions apply. Players may hold more than one non-FIFA nationality.

Manchester United
No.	Pos.	Nation	Player
1	GK	ENG	Gordon Clayton
2	DF	SCO	Bryce Fulton
3	DF	IRL	Paddy Kennedy
4	MF	ENG	Eddie Colman
5	MF	ENG	Ronnie Cope (c)
6	MF	ENG	Duncan Edwards
7	FW	IRL	Noel McFarlane
8	FW	IRL	Billy Whelan
9	FW	ENG	Eddie Lewis
10	FW	ENG	David Pegg
11	FW	ENG	Albert Scanlon
Manager		WAL	Jimmy Murphy

Wolverhampton Wanderers
No.	Pos.	Nation	Player
1	GK	ENG	Peter Owen
2	DF	ENG	Arthur Hodgkiss
3	DF	ENG	Eddie Clamp
4	MF	ENG	John Timmins
5	MF	ENG	Peter Russell
6	MF	ENG	Frank Bolton
7	FW	ENG	Brian Punter
8	FW	ENG	Robert Walker
9	FW	ENG	Harry Smith
10	FW	ENG	Colin Booth
11	FW	ENG	Len Cooper
Manager		ENG	Stan Cullis

=== Second leg ===
9 May 1953

Wolverhampton Wanderers	2–2	Manchester United
Smith 6', 66'		Lewis 34'; Whelan 37'

Molineux Stadium, Wolverhampton
Attendance: 14,290

Note: Flags indicate national team as defined under FIFA eligibility rules; some limited exceptions apply. Players may hold more than one non-FIFA nationality.

Wolverhampton Wanderers
No.	Pos.	Nation	Player
1	GK	ENG	Peter Owen
2	DF	ENG	Arthur Hodgkiss
3	DF	ENG	Eddie Clamp
4	MF	ENG	John Timmins
5	MF	ENG	Peter Russell
6	MF	ENG	Frank Bolton
7	FW	ENG	Lionel Stephenson
8	FW	ENG	Colin Booth
9	FW	ENG	Harry Smith
10	FW	ENG	Ron Howells
11	FW	ENG	Len Cooper
Manager		ENG	Stan Cullis

Manchester United
No.	Pos.	Nation	Player
1	GK	ENG	Gordon Clayton
2	DF	SCO	Bryce Fulton
3	DF	IRL	Paddy Kennedy
4	MF	ENG	Eddie Colman
5	MF	ENG	Ronnie Cope (c)
6	MF	ENG	Duncan Edwards
7	FW	IRL	Noel McFarlane
8	FW	IRL	Billy Whelan
9	FW	ENG	Eddie Lewis
10	FW	ENG	David Pegg
11	FW	ENG	Albert Scanlon
Manager		WAL	Jimmy Murphy

== 1953–54: Manchester United vs. Wolverhampton Wanderers (4–4 and 1–0, 5–4 aggregate) ==
=== First leg ===
Old Trafford, 23 April 1954
Manchester United – Wolverhampton Wanderers 4–4 (1–3)
1–0 Duncan Edwards
1–1 Joe Bonson
1–2 Jimmy Murray
1–3 Bobby Mason
2–3 David Pegg (pen.)
3–3 Duncan Edwards
3–4 John Fallon
4–4 David Pegg
Attendance: 18,246

Note: Flags indicate national team as defined under FIFA eligibility rules; some limited exceptions apply. Players may hold more than one non-FIFA nationality.

Manchester United
No.	Pos.	Nation	Player
1	GK	ENG	Tony Hawksworth
2	DF	ENG	Ivan Beswick
3	DF	ENG	Alan Rhodes
4	MF	ENG	Eddie Colman
5	MF	ENG	Bobby Harrop
6	MF	ENG	Wilf McGuinness
7	FW	ENG	Thomas Littler
8	FW	ENG	Duncan Edwards
9	FW	ENG	Bobby Charlton
10	FW	ENG	David Pegg (c)
11	FW	ENG	Albert Scanlon
Manager		WAL	Jimmy Murphy

Wolverhampton Wanderers
No.	Pos.	Nation	Player
1	GK	ENG	Geoff Sidebottom
2	DF	ENG	Tony Griffiths
3	DF	ENG	John Harris
4	MF	ENG	Frank Bolton
5	MF	ENG	John Timmins
6	MF	ENG	John Fallon
7	FW	ENG	Stanley Round
8	FW	ENG	Bobby Mason
9	FW	ENG	Joe Bonson
10	FW	ENG	Jimmy Murray
11	FW	ENG	Len Cooper
Manager		ENG	Stan Cullis

=== Second leg ===
Molineux, 26 April 1954
Wolverhampton Wanderers – Manchester United 0–1 (0–1)
0–1 34 min. David Pegg (pen.)
Attendance: 28,651

Note: Flags indicate national team as defined under FIFA eligibility rules; some limited exceptions apply. Players may hold more than one non-FIFA nationality.

Wolverhampton Wanderers
No.	Pos.	Nation	Player
1	GK	ENG	Geoff Sidebottom
2	DF	ENG	Tony Griffiths
3	DF	ENG	John Harris
4	MF	ENG	Frank Bolton
5	MF	ENG	John Timmins
6	MF	ENG	John Fallon
7	FW	ENG	Stanley Round
8	FW	ENG	Bobby Mason
9	FW	ENG	Joe Bonson
10	FW	ENG	Jimmy Murray
11	FW	ENG	Len Cooper
Manager		ENG	Stan Cullis

Manchester United
No.	Pos.	Nation	Player
1	GK	ENG	Tony Hawksworth
2	DF	ENG	Ivan Beswick
3	DF	ENG	Alan Rhodes
4	MF	ENG	Eddie Colman
5	MF	ENG	Bobby Harrop
6	MF	ENG	Wilf McGuinness
7	FW	ENG	Thomas Littler
8	FW	ENG	Duncan Edwards
9	FW	ENG	Bobby Charlton
10	FW	ENG	David Pegg (c)
11	FW	ENG	Albert Scanlon
Manager		WAL	Jimmy Murphy

== 1954–55: Manchester United vs. West Bromwich Albion (4–1 and 3–0, 7–1 aggregate) ==
=== First leg ===
Old Trafford, 27 April 1955
Manchester United – West Bromwich Albion 4–1 (2–0)
1–0 40 min. Bobby Charlton
2–0 43 min. Eddie Colman
3–0 67 min. Eddie Colman
3–1 68 min. Barry Hughes
4–1 85 min. Duncan Edwards
Attendance: 16,696

Note: Flags indicate national team as defined under FIFA eligibility rules; some limited exceptions apply. Players may hold more than one non-FIFA nationality.

Manchester United
No.	Pos.	Nation	Player
1	GK	ENG	Tony Hawksworth
2	DF	ENG	John Queenan
3	DF	ENG	Alan Rhodes
4	MF	ENG	Eddie Colman (c)
5	MF	ENG	Peter Jones
6	MF	ENG	Wilf McGuinness
7	FW	ENG	Terry Beckett
8	FW	IRL	Shay Brennan
9	FW	ENG	Duncan Edwards
10	FW	ENG	Bobby Charlton
11	FW	ENG	Dennis Fidler
Manager		WAL	Jimmy Murphy

West Bromwich Albion
No.	Pos.	Nation	Player
1	GK	ENG	Mick Cashmore
2	DF	ENG	Ray Whale
3	DF	ENG	John Rogers
4	MF	ENG	Chuck Drury
5	MF	WAL	Barry Hughes
6	MF	ENG	Barry Cooke
7	FW	ENG	Dick Maynes
8	FW	ENG	Maurice Setters
9	FW	ENG	Dick McCartney
10	FW	ENG	Alec Jackson
11	FW	WAL	Graham Williams
Manager		ENG	Unknown

=== Second leg ===
The Hawthorns, 30 April 1955
West Bromwich Albion – Manchester United 0–3 (0–0)
0–1 71 min. Terry Beckett
0–2 88 min. Eddie Colman
0–3 89 min. Eddie Colman
Attendance: 8,335

Note: Flags indicate national team as defined under FIFA eligibility rules; some limited exceptions apply. Players may hold more than one non-FIFA nationality.

West Bromwich Albion
No.	Pos.	Nation	Player
1	GK	ENG	Mick Cashmore
2	DF	ENG	Ray Whale
3	DF	ENG	John Rogers
4	MF	ENG	Maurice Setters
5	MF	WAL	Barry Hughes
6	MF	ENG	Barry Cooke
7	FW	ENG	Dick Maynes
8	FW	ENG	Jimmy Harris
9	FW	ENG	Dick McCartney
10	FW	ENG	Alec Jackson
11	FW	WAL	Graham Williams
Manager		ENG	Unknown

Manchester United
No.	Pos.	Nation	Player
1	GK	ENG	Tony Hawksworth
2	DF	ENG	John Queenan
3	DF	ENG	Alan Rhodes
4	MF	ENG	Eddie Colman (c)
5	MF	ENG	Wilf McGuinness
6	MF	ENG	Peter Jones
7	FW	ENG	Terry Beckett
8	FW	IRL	Shay Brennan
9	FW	ENG	Duncan Edwards
10	FW	ENG	Bobby Charlton
11	FW	ENG	Dennis Fidler
Manager		WAL	Jimmy Murphy

== 1955–56: Manchester United vs. Chesterfield (3–2 and 1–1, 4–3 aggregate) ==
=== First leg ===
Old Trafford, 30 April 1956
Manchester United – Chesterfield 3–2 (3–0)
1–0 11 min. Joe Carolan
2–0 17 min. Mark Pearson
3–0 30 min. Bobby Charlton
3–1 60 min. Jim Mellors
3–2 88 min. Peter Ledger
Attendance: 24,544

Note: Flags indicate national team as defined under FIFA eligibility rules; some limited exceptions apply. Players may hold more than one non-FIFA nationality.

Manchester United
No.	Pos.	Nation	Player
1	GK	ENG	Tony Hawksworth
2	DF	ENG	John Queenan
3	DF	ENG	Peter Jones
4	MF	IRL	Joe Carolan
5	MF	ENG	Reg Holland
6	MF	ENG	Wilf McGuinness (c)
7	FW	WAL	Kenny Morgans
8	FW	ENG	Mark Pearson
9	FW	SCO	Alex Dawson
10	FW	ENG	Bobby Charlton
11	FW	ENG	Dennis Fidler
Manager		WAL	Jimmy Murphy

Chesterfield
No.	Pos.	Nation	Player
1	GK	ENG	Gordon Banks
2	DF	ENG	Jack Detchon
3	DF	ENG	Graham Whitehead
4	MF	ENG	Gerry Graham
5	DF	ENG	Peter Brent
6	MF	ENG	Johnny Brooks
7	FW	ENG	Peter Ledger
8	FW	ENG	Keith Havenhand
9	FW	ENG	Jim Mellors
10	FW	ENG	Harry Peck
11	FW	ENG	Charlie Rackstraw
Manager		ENG	Unknown

=== Second leg ===
Recreation Ground, 7 May 1956
Chesterfield – Manchester United 1–1 (1–0)
1–0 66 min. Keith Havenhand
1–1 90 min. Dennis Fidler
Attendance: 15,838

Note: Flags indicate national team as defined under FIFA eligibility rules; some limited exceptions apply. Players may hold more than one non-FIFA nationality.

Chesterfield
No.	Pos.	Nation	Player
1	GK	ENG	Gordon Banks
2	DF	ENG	Jack Detchon
3	DF	ENG	Graham Whitehead
4	MF	ENG	Gerry Graham
5	MF	ENG	Peter Brent
6	MF	ENG	Johnny Brooks
7	FW	ENG	Peter Ledger
8	FW	ENG	Keith Havenhand
9	FW	ENG	Jim Mellors
10	FW	ENG	Harry Peck
11	FW	ENG	Archie Smith
Manager		ENG	Unknown

Manchester United
No.	Pos.	Nation	Player
1	GK	ENG	Tony Hawksworth
2	DF	ENG	John Queenan
3	DF	ENG	Peter Jones
4	MF	IRL	Joe Carolan
5	MF	ENG	Reg Holland
6	MF	ENG	Wilf McGuinness (c)
7	FW	WAL	Kenny Morgans
8	FW	ENG	Mark Pearson
9	FW	SCO	Alex Dawson
10	FW	ENG	Bobby Charlton
11	FW	ENG	Dennis Fidler
Manager		WAL	Jimmy Murphy

== 1956–57: Manchester United vs. West Ham United (3–2 and 5–0, 8–2 aggregate) ==
=== First leg ===
Upton Park, 2 May 1957
West Ham United – Manchester United 2–3 (1–1)
0–1 26 min. Alex Dawson
1–1 38 min. John Cartwright
1–2 52 min. Nobby Lawton
1–3 55 min. Reg Hunter
2–3 64 min. George Fenn (pen.)
Attendance: 15,000

Note: Flags indicate national team as defined under FIFA eligibility rules; some limited exceptions apply. Players may hold more than one non-FIFA nationality.

West Ham United
No.	Pos.	Nation	Player
1	GK	ENG	Brian Goymer
2	DF	ENG	Joe Kirkup
3	DF	ENG	Albert Howe
4	MF	ENG	Clive Lewis
5	MF	ENG	Roy Walker
6	MF	ENG	John Lyall
7	FW	ENG	Charles Rowlands
8	FW	SCO	John Smith
9	FW	ENG	George Fenn
10	FW	ENG	John Cartwright
11	FW	ENG	Terry McDonald
Manager		ENG	Bill Robinson

Manchester United
No.	Pos.	Nation	Player
1	GK	ENG	David Gaskell
2	DF	ENG	Barry Smith
3	DF	ENG	Ray Maddison
4	MF	ENG	Bob English
5	MF	ENG	Reg Holland
6	MF	ENG	Harold Bratt
7	FW	WAL	Kenny Morgans (c)
8	FW	ENG	Nobby Lawton
9	FW	SCO	Alex Dawson
10	FW	ENG	Mark Pearson
11	FW	WAL	Reg Hunter
Manager		WAL	Jimmy Murphy

=== Second leg ===
Old Trafford, 7 May 1957
Manchester United – West Ham United 5–0 (3–0)
1–0 24 min. Kenny Morgans
2–0 28 min. Mark Pearson
3–0 30 min. Mark Pearson
4–0 63 min. Alex Dawson
5–0 70 min. Alex Dawson
Attendance: 15,838

Note: Flags indicate national team as defined under FIFA eligibility rules; some limited exceptions apply. Players may hold more than one non-FIFA nationality.

Manchester United
No.	Pos.	Nation	Player
1	GK	ENG	David Gaskell
2	DF	ENG	Barry Smith
3	DF	ENG	Ray Maddison
4	MF	ENG	Bob English
5	MF	ENG	Reg Holland
6	MF	ENG	Harold Bratt
7	FW	WAL	Kenny Morgans (c)
8	FW	ENG	Nobby Lawton
9	FW	SCO	Alex Dawson
10	FW	ENG	Mark Pearson
11	FW	WAL	Reg Hunter
Manager		WAL	Jimmy Murphy

West Ham United
No.	Pos.	Nation	Player
1	GK	ENG	Brian Goymer
2	DF	ENG	Joe Kirkup
3	DF	ENG	Albert Howe
4	MF	ENG	Clive Lewis
5	MF	ENG	Roy Walker
6	MF	ENG	John Lyall
7	FW	ENG	Charles Rowlands
8	FW	SCO	John Smith
9	FW	ENG	George Fenn
10	FW	ENG	John Cartwright
11	FW	ENG	Terry McDonald
Manager		ENG	Bill Robinson

== 1957–58: Wolverhampton Wanderers vs. Chelsea (1–5 and 6–1, 7–6 aggregate) ==
Note: Flags indicate national team as defined under FIFA eligibility rules; some limited exceptions apply. Players may hold more than one non-FIFA nationality.

Chelsea
No.	Pos.	Nation	Player
1	GK	ENG	Barry Smart
2	DF	ENG	Ken Shellito
3	DF	ENG	Brian Legg
4	MF	ENG	Terry Bradbury
5	MF	ENG	Mel Scott
6	MF	ENG	Dennis Long
7	FW	ENG	Micky Block
8	FW	ENG	David Cliss
9	FW	ENG	Barry Bridges
10	FW	ENG	Jimmy Greaves
11	FW	ENG	Michael Harrison
Manager		ENG	Dickie Foss

Wolverhampton Wanderers
No.	Pos.	Nation	Player
1	GK	IRL	John Cullen
2	DF	IRL	Phil Kelly
3	DF	ENG	Yates
4	MF	ENG	John Kirkham
5	MF	ENG	Granville Palin (c)
6	MF	ENG	Les Cocker
7	FW	RSA	Des Horne
8	FW	ENG	Ian Hall
9	FW	ENG	Ted Farmer
10	FW	RSA	Cliff Durandt
11	FW	ENG	Brian Perry
Manager		ENG	Stan Cullis

== 1958–59: Blackburn Rovers vs. West Ham United (1–1 and 1–0, 2–1 aggregate) ==
Note: Flags indicate national team as defined under FIFA eligibility rules; some limited exceptions apply. Players may hold more than one non-FIFA nationality.

Blackburn Rovers
No.	Pos.	Nation	Player
1	GK	ENG	Barry Griffiths
2	DF	ENG	David Wells
3	DF	ENG	Fred Pickering
4	DF	WAL	Mike England
5	DF	ENG	Keith Newton
6	MF	ENG	Vincent Leach
7	MF	ENG	Barrie Ratcliffe
8	FW	ENG	Alan Bradshaw
9	FW	ENG	Bill Jervis
10	FW	ENG	Paddy Daly
11	FW	IRL	Paddy Mulvey

West Ham United
No.	Pos.	Nation	Player
1	GK	ENG	Frank Caskey
2	DF	ENG	Harry Cripps
3	DF	ENG	Jack Burkett
4	MF	ENG	Eddie Bovington
5	DF	ENG	Bobby Moore
6	MF	ENG	Mickey Brooks
7	MF	ENG	Derek Woodley
8	FW	ENG	John Cartwright
9	FW	ENG	Mickey Beesley
10	FW	ENG	Andy Smillie
11	FW	ENG	Tony Scott
6	MF	ENG	Geoff Hurst
