= John Cartwright (footballer) =

English footballer and coach

Personal information
- Date of birth: 5 November 1940 (age 85)
- Place of birth: Brixworth, England
- Position: Inside forward

Youth career
- 1956–1959: West Ham United

Senior career*
Years	Team	Apps	(Gls)
1959–1961	West Ham United	4	(0)
1961–1963	Crystal Palace	11	(1)
1963–1964	Bath City		
1964–1968	Wimbledon	120	(19)

International career
1957	England U18	3	(0)
- * Club domestic league appearances and goals

John Cartwright (born 5 November 1940) is an English former professional footballer who played as an inside forward. He later became a coach.

== Career ==
Born in Brixworth, Cartwright went to Parmiter's School in Bethnal Green. He was spotted by Wally St Pier while playing for East London and London Schoolboys and signed for West Ham United. He was part of the youth team that won the Southern Junior Floodlit Cup in 1956–57, and played in the 1958–59 FA Youth Cup Final, under the stewardship of Ted Fenton. He played in both legs of the Youth Cup final, which the Hammers lost 2–1 on aggregate. He had set up West Ham's first-leg goal, a long cross which Andy Smillie headed past Blackburn goalkeeper Barry Griffiths.

Cartwright played in three youth international matches. The first was a challenge match against Luxembourg on 2 February 1957 at West Ham's own Boleyn Ground. He then played against the Netherlands in the UEFA International Youth Tournament on 14 April 1957, and against Ireland in the British Youth Championships on 11 May 1957.

It was through Ted Fenton that Cartwright got into coaching at an early age, as Fenton encouraged all the players at the academy to take their coaching badges so that after playing they had something to fall back on. He gained his junior coaching qualification in 1958, while still playing for the youth team. He added the senior qualification in 1961, the year he left West Ham. He had also witnessed the influence that players such as Malcolm Allison had had on team tactics and motivation, later describing it as "a form of communism at the club. The players really ruled it. In short, a dictatorship of the football proletariat".

Cartwright made his senior debut for West Ham on 17 October 1959, starting the match against Everton at Goodison Park. "I made Malcolm Musgrove's goal in my first game", Cartwright later recalled. The match ended in a 1–0 win for West Ham. However, with competition from the likes of Phil Woosnam and Ron Boyce, Cartwright found his chances limited at West Ham. He made just four senior appearances in the Football League for the club between 1959 and 1961, although he managed three goals in four appearances in the League Cup and its forerunner, the Southern Professional Floodlit Cup.

Shortly after Ron Greenwood took over the reins at West Ham, Cartwright moved to Crystal Palace, where he made 11 appearances in the League, before dropping down to the Southern League to join Malcolm Allison at Bath City in the summer of 1963. He played 60 games for the Somerset club, scoring 30 goals, and left in October 1964.

He joined Wimbledon, also of the Southern League, becoming their first player to be paid a fee after the club turned professional in 1964. He made 120 league appearances for the Dons, scoring 19 goals.

Cartwright worked as youth coach at Crystal Palace between 1971 and 1978, working with the team that won the FA Youth Cup in 1976–77 and 1977–78.

He managed the England Youth (under 18) team, as England's first full-time youth coach, between 1978 and 1982.

After a spell coaching with Kuwait Sporting Club, where he was assistant to Geoff Hurst, he joined Arsenal as assistant manager in March 1985. He, along with manager Don Howe, resigned in March 1986.

After another spell in Kuwait, he became technical director at the Football Association's National School of Excellence, Lilleshall. He resigned after two years in the job after disagreeing with former director of coaching and education, Charles Hughes. He has since been a vocal critic of coaching methods in England.

Cartwright went on to join Charlton Athletic as youth team manager, and was then technical director at the Professional Footballers' Association between 1993 and 1995

After a third spell in Kuwait, Cartwright became academy director at Crystal Palace. In 2001, he set up Premier Skills, a company which delivers coach education and player development courses.

Cartwright is also a former chairman of the London Football Coaches Association.

Cartwright is an author of two books about football coaching. Teaching Soccer to Boys, cowritten with Alan Gibbon, was released in 1972, and Football for the Brave was released in 2008.

== Career statistics ==
Appearances and goals by club, season and competition
Club	Season	League			FA Cup		League Cup		Other		Total	
Club	Season	Division	Apps	Goals	Apps	Goals	Apps	Goals	Apps	Goals	Apps	Goals
West Ham United	1958–59	Division 1	—		—		—		1 (Note: Southern Professional Floodlit Cup (first round) v Charlton Athletic, 27 October 1958)	0	1	0
West Ham United	1959–60	Division 1	3	0	—		—		2 (Note: Southern Professional Floodlit Cup (Semi-final) v Arsenal, 5 April 1960 (2 goals); Southern Professional Floodlit Cup (final) v Coventry City, 27 April 1960 (1 goal))	3	5	3
West Ham United	1960–61	Division 1	1	0	—		1	0	—		2	0
West Ham United	Total		4	0	—		1	0	3	3	8	3
Crystal Palace	1961–62	Division 3	7	0	1	0	—		—		8	0
Crystal Palace	1962–63	Division 3	4	1	—		—		—		4	1
Crystal Palace	Total		11	1	1	0	—		—		12	1
Bath City	1963–64	Southern Premier	Not available (Note: Cartwright made 60 competitive appearances for Bath City, scoring 30 goals. In 1963–64, he made 50 appearances, scoring 26 goals (21 league and 5 cup). In 1964–65, he made 10 appearances, scoring 4 goals (all league).)									
Bath City	1964–65	Southern Premier	Not available									
Wimbledon	1964–65	Southern Division 1	32	8	0	0	2	0	—		34	8
Wimbledon	1965–66	Southern Premier	36	3	2	0	2	2	—		41	5
Wimbledon	1966–67	Southern Premier	41	3	3	0	4	1	—		47	4
Wimbledon	1967–68	Southern Premier	11	5	1	0	2	0	—		14	5
Wimbledon	Total		120	19	6	0	10	3	—		136	22
Career total			135	20	8	0	11	3	3	3	156	26
