= Les Cocker =

Les Cocker is the name of:

- Les Cocker (footballer, born 1924) (1924–1979), English footballer for Stockport County and Accrington Stanley
- Les Cocker (footballer, born 1939) (1939–2017), English footballer for Wolverhampton Wanderers
