= Dungworth (disambiguation) =

Dungworth is a village in South Yorkshire.

Dungworth may also refer to:

- John Dungworth, football coach
- Richard Dungworth, author
