= John Lee, Baron Lee of Trafford =

British politician (born 1942)

The Right Honourable The Lord Lee of Trafford DL
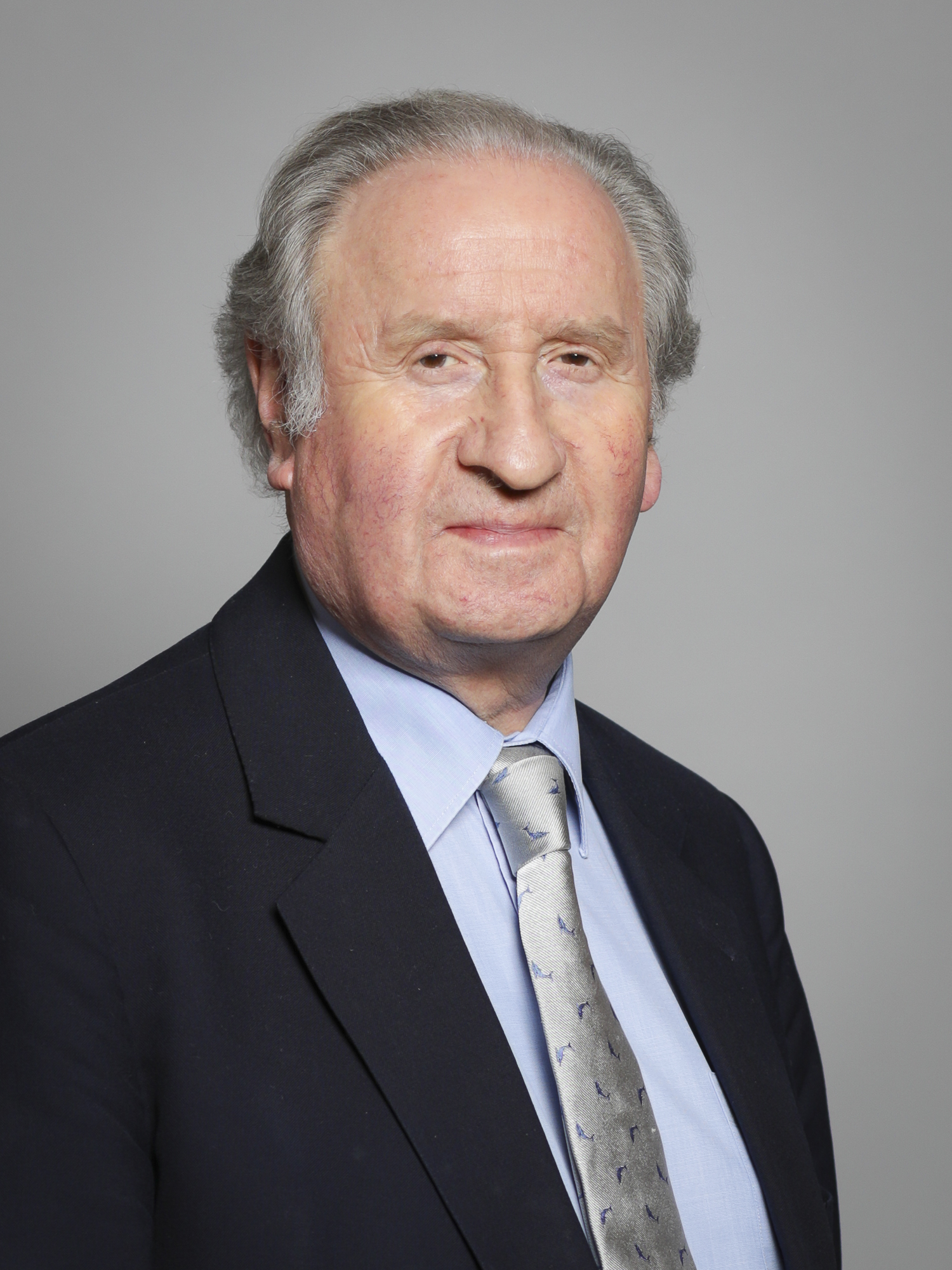
- Official Portrait (2019)

Member of the House of Lords
- Lord Temporal
- Life peerage 26 May 2006

Member of Parliament for Pendle (Nelson and Colne 1979–1983)
- In office 3 May 1979 – 16 March 1992
- Preceded by: Doug Hoyle
- Succeeded by: Gordon Prentice

Personal details
- Born: 21 June 1942 (age 84) Manchester, United Kingdom
- Party: Liberal Democrats (2001–present); Conservative (1974–2001)
- Profession: Member of Parliament (1979–1992); High Sheriff of Manchester (1998)

John Robert Louis Lee, Baron Lee of Trafford, DL (born 21 June 1942) is a British Liberal Democrat politician, who has sat as a life peer since 2006.

He was previously a Conservative Member of Parliament (MP) from 1979 to 1992.

== Parliamentary career ==
He contested Manchester Moss Side in October 1974, but was beaten by Labour's Frank Hatton. He was Conservative MP for Nelson and Colne from 1979 to 1983, and then for Pendle from June 1983 until he lost his seat in April 1992 to Gordon Prentice from Labour.

He served as Junior Minister for Defence Procurement from 1983 to 1986, and then for Employment from 1986 to 1989, being Minister for Tourism, from 1987 to 1989. He became a non executive director in 1999, and a member of the board of the Emerson Group.

== After politics ==
He has been chairman of the Association of Leading Visitor Attractions, a major trade body, since 1990. He is a Deputy Lieutenant of Greater Manchester, and was High Sheriff of Greater Manchester in 1998. He was previously chairman of the Christie NHS Foundation Trust, Museum of Science and Industry in Manchester and the council of the National Youth Agency.

He was formerly a member of the English Tourist Board and vice-chairman of the North West Conciliation Committee of the Race Relations Board.

He is Patron of ShareSoc, which represents individual shareholders society in the UK.

He is the Chair of The Lee and Bakirgian Family Trust, a charitable organisation that provides financial aid to educational, community and religious institutions, particularly in Lancashire and Cheshire to promote research and to further charitable community and youth projects.

== House of Lords ==
He left the Conservatives in May 2001, shortly before that year's general election, and joined the Liberal Democrats. He was made a life peer as Baron Lee of Trafford of Bowdon in the County of Cheshire on 26 May 2006. From 2007 to 2012, he served as a Whip for the Liberal Democrats in the House of Lords. His focus areas are defence and tourism, specifically in the North West of England.

He vowed to resign in February 2012 in protest at the House of Lords Reform Bill making its way into the Queen's Speech.

Since January 2021, he has served on the House of Lords Finance Committee

In 2013 he released his "financial autobiography", How to Make a Million – Slowly: Guiding Principles From a Lifetime Investing. He has also published his pictorial autobiography, entitled Portfolio Man, and in 2019 published a guide for young people on investing in the stock market, entitled Yummi Yoghurt, which tells the story of a fictional family company that joins the stock market.

== Personal life ==
He currently lives in Richmond, south-west London, and is deputy chair of the Museum of Richmond.

== Arms ==
Coat of arms of John Lee, Baron Lee of Trafford

Adopted
2007
Coronet
Coronet of a Baron
Crest
On a Helm, with a Wreath Argent, and Gules a Male Griffin. Sejant erect Sable, beaked forelegged, and rayed Or, supporting a Staff, also Or, attached thereto a triangular Pennon Argent.
Escutcheon
Paly of six Gules and Sable, on a bend wavy. Argent three bulls' heads, caboshed per pale Sable, and Gules armed Or.
Supporters
On either side, a Salmon Argent, enfiling an Ancient Crown Or.
Motto
EQUITY
Badge
Two Salmon, in saltire Argent, anciently crowned Or.
Symbolism
A career in banking and accountancy, before turning to politics, is reflected in the black and red pales, for credit and debit, the bulls' heads representing the bull market, on the Stock Exchange. The gryphon is associated with treasure, in particular gold; and the grantee's interests in golf and fly fishing feature, in the Crest, Supporters and Badge.

== Sources ==
- Times Guide to the House of Commons, 1992

Parliament of the United Kingdom
Preceded by Doug Hoyle	Member of Parliament for Nelson and Colne; 1979–1983	Constituency abolished
New constituency	Member of Parliament for Pendle; 1983–1992	Succeeded by Gordon Prentice
Orders of precedence in the United Kingdom
Preceded by The Lord Crisp	Gentlemen; Baron Lee of Trafford	Followed by The Lord Taylor of Holbeach
Honorary titles
Preceded by Warren J. Smith	High Sheriff of Greater Manchester; 1998–9	Succeeded by Norman K. Stoller
