= Paddy Kennedy (association footballer) =

Irish footballer (1934–2007)

Personal information
- Full name: Patrick Anthony Kennedy
- Date of birth: 9 October 1934
- Place of birth: Dublin, Ireland
- Date of death: 18 March 2007 (aged 72)
- Place of death: Urmston, England
- Height: 5 ft 11 in (1.80 m)
- Position: Left-back

Youth career
- Johnville (Dublin)
- 1950–1953: Manchester United

Senior career*
Years	Team	Apps	(Gls)
1953–1956	Manchester United	1	(0)
1956–1959	Blackburn Rovers	3	(0)
1959–1960	Southampton	2	(0)
1960–19?	Oldham Athletic	0	(0)
Total		6	(0)
- * Club domestic league appearances and goals

Patrick Anthony Kennedy (9 October 1934 – 18 March 2007) was an Irish footballer who played as a left-back for various clubs in the 1950s. As one of the Busby Babes, he was part of the Manchester United side that won the FA Youth Cup in 1953.

== Football career ==
Kennedy was born in Dublin, in the Irish Republic and moved to England to join Manchester United as a 15-year-old. Awarded his professional contract in February 1953, Kennedy played alongside the likes of Duncan Edwards, Eddie Colman, David Pegg and Liam Whelan in United's FA Youth Cup winning side of 1953, when they defeated Wolverhampton Wanderers, 9–3 on aggregate.

Kennedy only made one first-team appearance for United, also against Wolves, in a 4–2 defeat on 2 October 1954. He spent two further seasons in the reserves before a transfer to Blackburn Rovers in August 1956. Kennedy spent three seasons at Ewood Park, where his path to the first-team was blocked by long-serving England international Bill Eckersley. and he managed only three first-team appearances (all in the 1957–58 promotion winning season), before a transfer to Southampton of the Third Division in July 1959.

On joining the "Saints", he was immediately drafted into the first-team, making his debut in the opening game of the 1959–60 season, a 2–2 draw with Norwich City. He retained his place for the next match, a 2–3 defeat at Chesterfield, before being replaced at left-back by fellow-Irishman Tommy Traynor, who kept the number 3 shirt for the rest of the season, at the end of which Southampton were Division 3 champions. Kennedy only made four appearances for the Southampton reserves, with David Scurr blocking his way into the side, and was given a free transfer at the end of the season.

Kennedy then joined Oldham Athletic, but never made the Latics' first team due to injury.

== Later career ==
Kennedy later managed a local amateur side in Urmston, close to Old Trafford, where he remained resident until his death in March 2007. He was survived by his wife Bridget, four children, 11 grandchildren and three great grandchildren. His grandson Kieran Kennedy is also a professional footballer with York City.
