= John Kirkham (footballer, born 1941) =

English footballer (1941–2021)

Personal information
- Full name: John Kenneth Kirkham
- Date of birth: 13 May 1941
- Place of birth: Wednesbury, England
- Date of death: 11 February 2021 (aged 79)
- Place of death: Wednesbury, England
- Position: Wing half

Youth career
- 1956–1959: Wolverhampton Wanderers

Senior career*
Years	Team	Apps	(Gls)
1959–1965	Wolverhampton Wanderers	100	(12)
1965–1968	Peterborough United	46	(2)
1968–1969	Exeter City	32	(6)
1969	Durban Spurs		
1969–1970	Horwich RMI		
Total		178+	(20+)

International career
- England youth
- England U23
- * Club domestic league appearances and goals

John Kenneth Kirkham (13 May 1941 – 11 February 2021) was an English professional footballer who played as a wing half.

== Club career ==
Born in Wednesbury, Kirkham began his career with Wolverhampton Wanderers in 1956, turning professional in 1958 and making his first team debut in 1959. He also played in the 1957–58 FA Youth Cup.

He later played for Peterborough United, Exeter City, Durban Spurs and Horwich RMI.

== International career ==
He played for England at youth and under-23 levels.

== Later life and death ==
He retired to South Africa but returned to England after the death of his wife, and lived in Wigan. He died on 11 February 2021, aged 79.
