= Terry McDonald (footballer) =

English footballer

Personal information
- Date of birth: 12 November 1938 (age 87)
- Place of birth: Stepney, London, England
- Position: Left winger

Youth career
- –1956: West Ham United

Senior career*
Years	Team	Apps	(Gls)
1956–1959	West Ham United	0	(0)
1959–1966	Leyton Orient	152	(23)
1966–1967	Reading	13	(2)
1967–1968	Wimbledon		
1968–1969	Folkestone Town		

International career
1956	England Youth	1	(0)
- * Club domestic league appearances and goals

Terry McDonald (born 12 November 1938) is an English former footballer who played mostly as a winger, mainly for Leyton Orient.

== Career ==
=== West Ham ===
McDonald was born in Stepney, London. As a youngster, he was on the books of West Ham United, but only made one appearance in their first team, in a friendly against Spartak Prague in October 1958. As a member of West Ham's youth team, he played in the 1957 Youth Cup Final defeat to Manchester United, and had also played for England Youth against Hungary in Budapest in 1956.

=== Leyton Orient ===
After West Ham had released McDonald following his demob from the Army, he signed for Leyton Orient in July 1959, turning down an offer from Ipswich Town. On his debut for the Os on 17 October 1959, he scored direct from a corner-kick in the 3–1 win over Hull City. He went on to have a strong influence in the promotion winning side of 1961–62, and made 20 league appearances for the Os in their one season in the top flight. The high point of McDonald's season was his 89th-minute winner for Orient in the 1–0 win over Manchester United on 8 September 1962.

=== Reading ===
After losing his regular place in the Orient side to Malcolm Musgrove, McDonald's appearances became less frequent, and although he turned down an opportunity to move to Newcastle United, Orient manager Dave Sexton gave him a free transfer and he signed for Reading in May 1965. However, only a few months into his stay at Elm Park, he was sent off for using bad language in a match against Bournemouth and was thereafter restricted to playing in the reserve team.

=== Non-league football and retirement ===
In the summer of 1966, McDonald signed for Southern League club Wimbledon, and the following year he moved on to now-defunct Folkestone Town. He eventually retired from football due to work commitments, running a number of betting shops, and also working as a coach at football schools in the United States in the 1980s. He also coached schoolboys on behalf of Norwich City, Chelsea and Leyton Orient, working with players such as Paul Ince, Leon Knight and Jeff Brazier, but did not get on well with Os manager John Sitton or youth development manager Paul Brush. He currently lives in Leyton and maintains regular contact with Leyton Orient.
