= Norman Stoller =

Sir Norman Stoller CBE KStJ DL
- Born: 6 September 1934 (age 90); Hackney, London, England
- Spouse(s): Sheila, Lady Stoller

Sir Norman Kelvin Stoller (born 6 September 1934) CBE KStJ DL is a British businessman and philanthropist.

After three previous honours of the MBE in 1976, the OBE in 1999 and CBE in 2010 he was knighted in the 2016 New Years Honours List for his philanthropic services. Stoller founded the Norman Stoller Charitable Trust in the 1980s, and donated over fifty million pounds to various causes.

He served as High Sheriff of Greater Manchester from 1999 to 2000. He was appointed as a deputy lieutenant of Greater Manchester in 1995. He served in this role until 2009 when he reached the Mandatory retirement age of 75 after which he was moved to the retired list. He was awarded the Freedom of the Borough of Oldham on 16 April 2008. He was made a Knight of Justice of the Order of St John of Jerusalem (KStJ) in 2014. Sir Norman resides in Windermere.

Honorary titles
| Preceded by John, Lord Lee of Trafford | High Sheriff of Greater Manchester; 1999–2000 | Succeeded by John Noel Abbott |
