= Lord Lieutenant of Greater Manchester =

Representative of the British monarch

Lord-Lieutenant of Greater Manchester
- Standard of the Lord-Lieutenant
- Incumbent; Diane Hawkins since 4 July 2022
- Style: Lord-Lieutenant
- Inaugural holder: Sir William Downward; 1 April 1974
- Formation: 1 April 1974
- Website: Lord-Lieutenancy

The Lord Lieutenant of Greater Manchester is the representative of the monarch, King Charles III in the metropolitan county of Greater Manchester in North West England. As Greater Manchester remains part of the Lancashire County Palatine, the Lord Lieutenant is appointed by the monarch in their capacity as Duke of Lancaster.

The office was created on 1 April 1974. Before 1974 the area had been covered by the Lord Lieutenant of Lancashire, the Lord Lieutenant of Cheshire, and a small part by the Lord Lieutenant of the West Riding of Yorkshire. The role of the Lord Lieutenant is to "first and foremost ... to uphold the dignity of the Crown". The Lord Lieutenant also acts as Keeper of the Rolls. It also promoted the work of voluntary service and benevolent organisations.

The Lord Lieutenant is aided in his office by over seventy deputy lieutenants.

== List of lord-lieutenants of Greater Manchester ==
No.	Lord lieutenant	From	Until
1	Sir William Downward	1 April 1974	27 January 1988
2	Col. Sir John Timmins	27 January 1988	11 July 2007
3	Sir Warren Smith	11 July 2007	4 July 2022
4	Diane Hawkins	4 July 2022	present

== See also ==
- High Sheriff of Greater Manchester
