= Ross McFarlane =

English professional golfer (born 1961)

Personal information
- Full name: Ross McFarlane
- Nationality: England
- Born: 25 May 1961 (age 65) Manchester, England
- Height: 5 ft 9.5 in (1.77 m)
- Weight: 175 lb (79 kg; 12.5 st)

Career
- Sport: Golf
- Turned professional: 1979
- Former tour: European Tour
- Professional wins: 2

Number of wins by tour
- European Tour: 1

Best results in major championships
- Masters Tournament: DNP
- PGA Championship: DNP
- U.S. Open: DNP
- The Open Championship: T55: 1994

Ross McFarlane (born 25 May 1961) is an English professional golfer.

== Career ==
McFarlane was born in Manchester in 1961. He is the son of Manchester United footballer Noel.

McFarlane turned professional in 1979. He played on the European Tour for many years, making the top 100 in the Order of Merit seven times, with a best ranking of 26th in 1997. That year he collected his only European Tour tournament win at the Deutsche Bank Open TPC of Europe, which earned him a five-year exemption on tour.

Having struggled to build on that win, in 2001 McFarlane played only a few tournaments as he joined Sky Sports as a golf commentator, despite still having over a year left on his European Tour exemption. He has also worked for the Golf Channel.

== Personal life ==
On 30 January 2014, McFarlane was given a suspended prison sentence of ten months and forced to sign the sex offenders register for 10 years, for being in possession of over 150 indecent images of children. Four weeks later, he was re-arrested after breaking the terms of his suspended sentence, and on 3 March, he was jailed for 18 months.

== Professional wins (2) ==
=== European Tour wins (1) ===
No.	Date	Tournament	Winning score	Margin of victory	Runners-up
1	1 Jun 1997	Deutsche Bank Open TPC of Europe	−6 (70-73-68-71=282)	1 stroke	(Scotland) Gordon Brand Jnr, (Sweden) Anders Forsbrand

=== Other wins (1) ===
- 1987 Midland Professional Championship

== Results in major championships ==
Tournament	1989	1990	1991	1992	1993	1994	1995	1996	1997	1998	1999
The Open Championship	CUT					T55		CUT	CUT		CUT

Note: McFarlane only played in The Open Championship.

Did not play

CUT = missed the half-way cut
"T" = tied
