= Alexandra Burslem =

British academic and educationalist (1940–2023)

Dame Alexandra Burslem DBE DL JP FRSA
- Born: Alexandra Vivien Thornley; 6 May 1940; Shanghai, China
- Died: 3 November 2023 (aged 83)
- Other names: Sandra Thornley; Sandra Burslem
- Occupations: Academic, educationalist
- Spouse(s): James Lowe (1960–1971); Dr Richard Waywell Burslem (1977–2023)
- Children: 3

Academic background
- Education: University of Manchester

Academic work
- Institutions: Manchester Polytechnic

Dame Alexandra Vivien Burslem DBE DL JP FRSA (née Thornley; 6 May 1940 – 3 November 2023), also known as Sandra Burslem, was a British academic and educationalist.

== Biography ==
Alexandra Vivien "Sandra" Thornley was born on 6 May 1940 in the Shanghai International Settlement in Shanghai, China. Her parents, Stanley Morris Thornley, a chartered accountant from Blackpool, and Myrra (née Kimberley) and older brother Ian had moved to China in 1937, when Stanley got a job with Jardine Matheson. After the Pearl Harbor attack in December 1941, Britain declared war on Japan and the British expatriates in the Shanghai International Settlement, including the Thornley family were captured and interned by the Japanese at the Lunghua Civilian Assembly Centre, an internment camp made famous by Empire of the Sun, whose author J. G. Ballard was also imprisoned there.

The family lived in the camp until 1946, when the outbreak of peace finally allowed them to return to the United Kingdom, where they settled on the Fylde Coast. She subsequently attended the Arnold High School for Girls in Blackpool, where she was an outstanding student. She was married in 1960 and quickly had two children, but the marriage did not last. At the age of 28, she enrolled on her first degree course, while a single mother, at the University of Manchester (as a mature student) and took a first-class BA degree in Politics and Modern History.

Following this, she became a lecturer at Manchester Polytechnic and rose gradually to be Deputy Vice-Chancellor and Academic Director by 1992. Her academic career culminated in September 1997, when she was named as Vice-Chancellor of Manchester Metropolitan University, where she remained until 2005.

=== Personal life and death ===
Her first marriage to James Lowe lasted from 1960 until 1971, from which she had two children, Eliot Lowe and Matthew Lowe. She married Dr Richard Waywell Burslem in 1977 and gave birth to her third child, Victoria.

Dame Alexandra Vivien Burslem died on 3 November 2023, at the age of 83.

== Honours ==
In 1985, Burslem was elected to membership of the Manchester Literary and Philosophical Society

Burslem was appointed Dame Commander of the Order of the British Empire (DBE) in the 2004 New Year Honours. She served as High Sheriff of Greater Manchester for 2006–2007 and remains a Deputy Lieutenant of the county.

A building at Manchester Metropolitan University's All Saints campus has been named the Sandra Burslem Building.

== List of posts held ==
Burslem held a number of public and academic posts:

- At Manchester Metropolitan University (formerly Manchester Polytechnic):
  - Lecturer in politics and public administration (1973–82)
  - Head, Department of applied community studies (1982–86)
  - Dean, Faculty of community studies, law and education (1986–88)
  - Assistant Director (academic) (1988–90)
  - Deputy Director (1990–92)
  - Deputy Vice-Chancellor and Academic Director (1992–97)
- Justice of the Peace, Manchester Inner City Bench (1981–2010)
- Vice-chair, Learning and Skills Council (2004–?)
- Chairman, BBC North Regional Advisory Council
- Member, BBC General Advisory Council
- Deputy Chair, Higher Education Staff Development Agency (HESDA)

Honorary titles
Preceded by Sir David Wilmot	High Sheriff of Greater Manchester; 2006–2007	Succeeded by Michael Oglesby
