= High Sheriff of Greater Manchester =

English ceremonial officer

The Office of High Sheriff of Greater Manchester is the ceremonial position of High Sheriff appointed to Greater Manchester, a metropolitan county in North West England. The appointment is made by the British monarch, in their capacity as Duke of Lancaster, by pricking the Lites. Created in 1974, the High Sheriff of Greater Manchester has the duty to "protect and assist in upholding the dignity and well being of His Majesty's judges and to represent the Queens executive powers in respect of the administration of justice in the county".

The Office of High Sheriff is normally awarded to people of stature in Greater Manchester who have significantly and positively contributed in some way to the county's community either through voluntary work or through commerce or industry. The High Sheriff of Greater Manchester holds the post for one year and automatically becomes an ex officio trustee of the Greater Manchester High Sheriff's Police Trust during their year of office.

In addition to the role of "Keeper of The King's Peace in the County", foremost duties include looking after the High Court judges when they are sitting in the Manchester Crown Court. However, much of the administration being undertaken by an undersheriff. The post is granted in a ceremony at one of Greater Manchester's Town halls or other prominent venues in April each year.

== List of sheriffs ==
Each High Sheriff begins their year in office on 1 April.

Year	Sheriff
1974	Sir Neville Butterworth
1975	Douglas Edwards of Mere
1976	Colonel Sir Richard Dawnay Martin-Bird
1977	Vernon Stott of Greenfield, Oldham
1978	Dame Kathleen Ollerenshaw
1979	Major Ralph Leslie Stanford Raffles of Dene Road, Manchester
1980	David Israel Goldstone of Elm Road, Didsbury, Manchester
1981	Colonel Donald Edwin Gibbs of Alkrington, Middleton
1982	John Nightingale
1983	Angela Fishwick
1984	Bartle Hodgkiss of Lostock, Bolton
1985	Col. Tom Sherman *
1986	Col. Sir John Timmins
1987	Col. Arthur Axford
1988	Alan William Guest of Alderley Edge
1989	Col. William M. Elder of Lymm, Cheshire
1990	Norman Quick of Altrincham
1991	David Wilson
1992	Samuel Jack Victor Arditti of Dunham Belfry, Bowdon
1993	Lawrence Duncan Lawton of Greenfield, Oldham
1994	Sir John Zochonis
1995	Edmund Gartside
1996	Mary Flora MacKinnon Firth
1997	Warren J. Smith
1998	John Lee, Baron Lee of Trafford
1999	Norman K. Stoller
2000	Major John Noel Abbott of Alderley Edge
2001	Lady Joyce Montgomery
2002	Sir Netar Mallick
2003	Sue Hodgkiss
2004	Robert Eric Hough
2005	Sir David Wilmot
2006	Alexandra Burslem
2007	Michael Oglesby
2008	Edith Conn
2009	Christian Wewer
2010	Anil Ruia of Didsbury
2011	Christine Lee-Jones
2012	George Almond of Bromley Cross, Bolton
2013	Paul Griffiths of Lower Peover, Knutsford
2014	Paul Lee of Stanton Avenue, Didsbury
2015	Sharman Birtles of Audenshaw
2016	Joy Smith, Lady Smith of Leigh
2017	Kui Man Gerry Yeung
2018	Dr Robina Shah
2019	Mark Adlestone
2020	Eamonn O'Neal
2021	Diane Hawkins
2022	Lorraine Worsley-Carter
2023	Mary-Elizabeth Walker
2024	Eamonn O'Neal (Note: Appointed for a second time.)
2025	Martin Ainscough
2026	Mark Llewellin

== See also ==
- Greater Manchester Police
- Lord Lieutenant of Greater Manchester
