= Gordon Prentice =

British politician (born 1951)

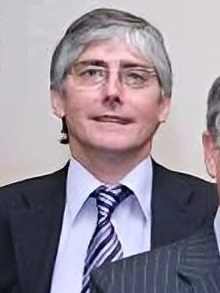
- Prentice in 2007

Member of Parliament for Pendle
- In office 9 April 1992 – 12 April 2010
- Preceded by: John Lee
- Succeeded by: Andrew Stephenson

Personal details
- Born: 28 January 1951 (age 75) Edinburgh, Scotland
- Party: Labour
- Spouses: Bridget Corr (m. 1975; div. 2000) Heather Halliday (m. 2011)
- Education: University of Glasgow
- Occupation: Council Leader (1986–1988); Member of Parliament (1992–2010)

Gordon Prentice (born 28 January 1951) is a British-Canadian former politician of the Labour Party who was the Member of Parliament (MP) for Pendle in Lancashire from 1992 to 2010.

== Early life ==
He was educated at the independent George Heriot's School in Edinburgh and the University of Glasgow, where he received an MA in Politics and Economics in 1975, and was president of the union. He then worked for the Labour Party Policy Directorate from 1982 to 1992.

Prior to becoming an MP, Prentice was the leader of Hammersmith and Fulham Council from 1986 to 1988.

== Parliamentary career ==
Prentice was initially selected as the prospective parliamentary candidate (PPC) for Pendle in October 1990, and was first elected at the 1992 general election with a majority of 2,113. At the same election his wife Bridget Prentice was elected MP for Lewisham East; both having defeated Conservative incumbents. He delivered his maiden speech a month later, on 13 May, in a debate on the economy, in which he wished his predecessor well for the future. Prentice held the constituency at the 1997 general election with a greatly increased majority of 10,824, the largest ever in Pendle and its predecessor constituency of Nelson and Colne. However, his majority was reduced to 4,275 at the 2001 general election and to 2,180 in 2005.

In 1999, Prentice introduced a Right to Roam Bill as a private member's bill, which aimed to establish a freedom to roam over certain upland and uncultivated areas of England and Wales. This became law in November 2000 as the Countryside and Rights of Way Act 2000.

Prentice campaigned against fox hunting and in May 2000 tabled an amendment to the government's Hunting Bill, vowing not to withdraw it unless the government gave a "cast-iron statement" that promised to introduce legislation before the next election. This resulted in protests outside his constituency office in Nelson in July 2000, despite protesters knowing he was in London. By 2002, Prentice was campaigning for fox hunting with dogs to be completely banned, asking the government to bring back the previous year's bill and to force it through parliament. He later became a target of the Countryside Alliance, who named him top of a "most wanted" list published in December 2003 and attempted to remove him as an MP at the next election.

In 2000, Prentice organised hustings for the election of the Speaker of the House of Commons, and later branded the election system "a farce" when interviewed by BBC One. He also said that neither ministers nor the chairman of the Parliamentary Labour Party should get involved in the election.

Prentice was angrily told off by Tony Blair in October 2004, when he asked during Prime Minister's Questions if there had been any single act of renewal in the Labour Party within the ten years Blair had been the party leader. He had previously been warned by the party in 1996 when he criticised Blair's performance as opposition leader. He then subsequently pledged his support for Blair the following week.

In 2005, Prentice was appointed to parliament's Public Administration Committee. Two years later, he called for tax-exiled peers to be removed from the House of Lords.

In March 2006, Prentice spoke out against the proposed merger of Lancashire Constabulary with Cumbria Constabulary. He later welcomed the merger being called off, saying it wasn’t appropriate for taxpayers in Lancashire to pay higher tax bills than those living in Cumbria. He called for "merger rethink" in the House of Commons shortly before the plans were announced.

Prentice was one of the few Labour MPs not to endorse Gordon Brown for the 2007 Labour Leadership, nominating left-winger John McDonnell for the role instead. The following year, he became the second MP (after Graham Stringer) to call for Brown to resign, remarking that "the prime minister needs different sets of skills from a Chancellor of the Exchequer".

After allegations involving Sophie, Countess of Wessex in April 2001, Prentice stated his belief that members of the British royal family should register their financial and business interests, like MPs. He also claimed he was "shocked by revelations" involving her.

Prentice lost his seat at the 2010 election and announced he would not stand at the next election, stating he was now a private citizen.

== Expenses scandal ==
In December 2009, Prentice was criticised for claiming £2,262 for items bought at John Lewis, including £749 for a television, £649 for a fridge-freezer and other amounts for various items of furniture. Prentice also claimed mortgage payments that amounted to £19,564 in 2004–05, £20,211 in 2005–06, £21,806 in 2006–07, £20,313 in 2007–08 and £19,508 in 2008–09. Following the scandal, Prentice did not claim anything for the first quarter of 2009–10. Prentice was among 625 other MPs at the time who received letters regarding the scandal, and paid back £2,620 to the House of Commons due to new, retrospective rules for expenses created by an external auditor. The auditor stressed that their findings carried no implication or innuendo about the conduct or motive of MPs.

== Personal life ==
Prentice married Bridget Prentice (née Corr), later also an MP for Lewisham East, whom he had met while at university. The couple divorced in 2000 after being separated for three years. Prentice subsequently married Heather Halliday in 2011.

Prentice revealed in July 2008 how he had become a victim of credit card fraud two months earlier in Yorkshire, and how he lost £3,500 after his card was copied with the use of a "skimming" device.

Soon after losing his seat in 2010, Prentice described the moment in 1998 when he was "nearly killed" by a man wielding a sledgehammer.

Parliament of the United Kingdom
Preceded by John Lee	Member of Parliament for Pendle; 1992 – 2010	Succeeded by Andrew Stephenson
