= Pendle (constituency) =

UK Parliament constituency (1983–2024)

Coordinates: 53.845°N 2.204°W

- Former borough constituency for the House of Commons
- Boundary of Pendle in Lancashire

- Location of Lancashire within England
- County: Lancashire
- Electorate: 66,735 (December 2010)
- Major settlements: Barnoldswick, Colne, Nelson

1983–2024
- Seats: One
- Created from: Nelson and Colne, Skipton and Clitheroe
- Replaced by: Pendle and Clitheroe

Pendle was a constituency (Note: A county constituency (for the purposes of election expenses and type of returning officer)) in Lancashire represented in the House of Commons of the UK Parliament. (Note: As with all constituencies, the constituency elected one Member of Parliament (MP) by the first past the post system of election at least every five years.) The constituency was newly created for the 1983 general election, being largely formed from the former Nelson and Colne constituency.

Further to the completion of the 2023 Periodic Review of Westminster constituencies, the seat was abolished. Subject to boundary changes—expanding it into the Borough of Ribble Valley, including the town of Clitheroe—it was reformed as Pendle and Clitheroe, which was first contested at the 2024 general election.

== Boundaries ==
Map of boundaries 2010-2024

Since its formation in 1983, the Pendle constituency has been coterminous with the borough of the same name; however the constituency boundaries were redrawn in 1997, due to local government boundary changes in the 1980s.

The major urban centres in Pendle are Nelson and Colne, with smaller towns Barnoldswick and Earby added to existing ones such as Higham and Pendleside and Craven, since boundary changes in the 1970s that brought them into Pendle Borough, Lancashire from Yorkshire.

Parliament accepted the Boundary Commission's Fifth Periodic Review of Westminster constituencies calling for slight changes in the run-up to the 2010 general election, since which Pendle has the same electoral wards as the Borough:

- Barrowford; Blacko and Higherford; Boulsworth; Bradley; Brierfield; Clover Hill; Coates; Craven; Earby; Foulridge; Higham and Pendleside; Horsfield; Marsden; Old Laund Booth; Reedley; Southfield; Vivary Bridge; Walverden; Waterside; Whitefield

== Constituency profile ==
Although in 1992 this was not a bellwether, Pendle was a key marginal with the Conservative lead over Labour being similar to the national lead in the 2010 general election. In terms of the local economy, unemployment is lower than the regional average, artisan creations, tourism, manufacturing, transport, food processing, the public sector and agriculture are large sectors.

== Members of Parliament ==
Election	Member	Party
1983	John Lee	Conservative
1992	Gordon Prentice	Labour
2010	Andrew Stephenson	Conservative

== Elections ==
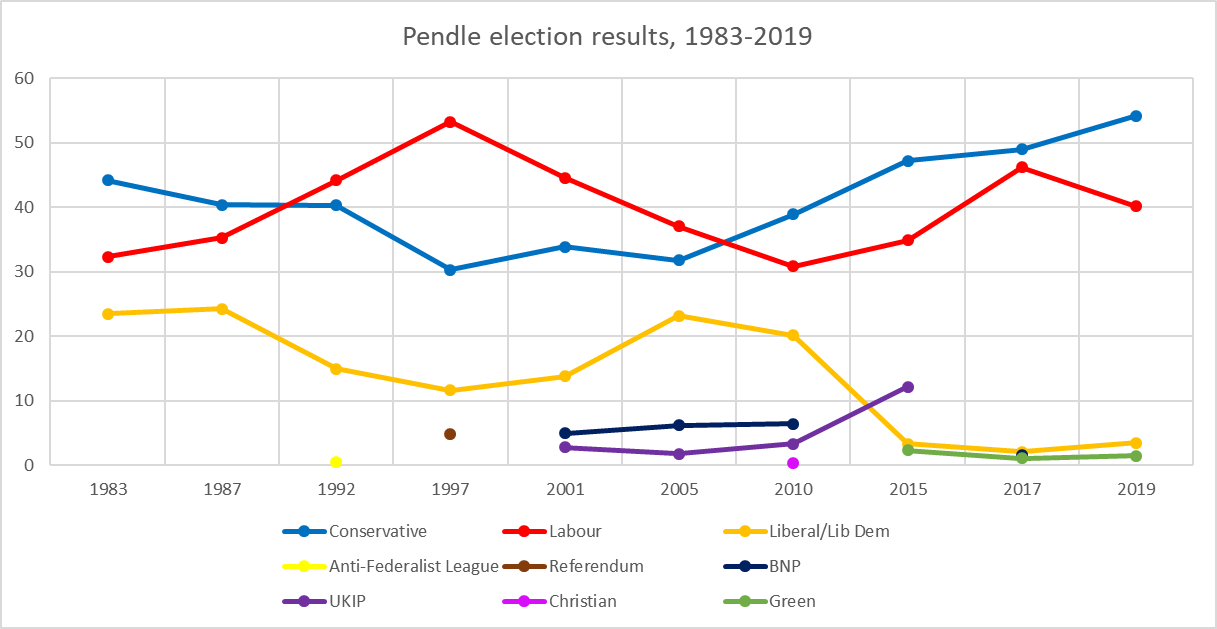
Pendle election results

=== Elections in the 2010s ===
General election 2019: Pendle
Party	Candidate	Votes	%	±%
Conservative	Andrew Stephenson	24,076	54.2	+5.2
Labour	Azhar Ali	17,890	40.2	―6.0
Liberal Democrats	Gordon Lishman	1,548	3.5	+1.4
Green	Clare Hales	678	1.5	+0.4
Independent	John Richardson	268	0.6	New
Majority		6,186	14.0	+12.2
Turnout		44,460	68.1	―0.9
Conservative hold		Swing	+5.5	

General election 2017: Pendle
Party	Candidate	Votes	%	±%
Conservative	Andrew Stephenson	21,986	49.0	+1.8
Labour	Wayne Blackburn	20,707	46.2	+11.3
Liberal Democrats	Gordon Lishman	941	2.1	―1.2
BNP	Brian Parker	718	1.6	New
Green	Ian Barnett	502	1.1	―1.2
Majority		1,279	2.8	―8.5
Turnout		44,854	69.0	+0.3
Conservative hold		Swing	―4.8	

General election 2015: Pendle
Party	Candidate	Votes	%	±%
Conservative	Andrew Stephenson	20,978	47.2	+8.3
Labour	Azhar Ali	15,525	34.9	+4.0
UKIP	Michael Waddington	5,415	12.2	+8.9
Liberal Democrats	Graham Roach	1,487	3.3	―16.9
Green	Laura Fisk	1,043	2.3	New
Majority		5,453	12.3	+4.3
Turnout		44,448	68.7	+0.9
Conservative hold		Swing	+2.15	

General election 2010: Pendle
Party	Candidate	Votes	%	±%
Conservative	Andrew Stephenson	17,512	38.9	+7.1
Labour	Gordon Prentice	13,927	30.9	―6.2
Liberal Democrats	Afzal Anwar	9,095	20.2	―3.0
BNP	James Jackman	2,894	6.4	+0.2
UKIP	Graham Cannon	1,476	3.3	+1.5
Christian	Richard Masih	141	0.3	New
Majority		3,585	8.0	N/A
Turnout		45,045	67.8	+4.1
Conservative gain from Labour		Swing	+6.6	

=== Elections in the 2000s ===
General election 2005: Pendle
Party	Candidate	Votes	%	±%
Labour	Gordon Prentice	15,250	37.1	―7.5
Conservative	Jane Ellison	13,070	31.8	―2.1
Liberal Democrats	Shazad Anwar	9,528	23.2	+9.4
BNP	Thomas Boocock	2,547	6.2	+1.2
UKIP	Graham Cannon	737	1.8	―1.0
Majority		2,180	5.3	―5.4
Turnout		41,132	63.4	+0.2
Labour hold		Swing	―2.7	

General election 2001: Pendle
Party	Candidate	Votes	%	±%
Labour	Gordon Prentice	17,729	44.6	―8.7
Conservative	Rasjid Skinner	13,454	33.9	+3.6
Liberal Democrats	David Whipp	5,479	13.8	+2.2
BNP	Chris Jackson	1,976	5.0	New
UKIP	Graham Cannon	1,094	2.8	New
Majority		4,275	10.7	―12.3
Turnout		39,732	63.2	―11.4
Labour hold		Swing		

=== Elections in the 1990s ===
General election 1997: Pendle
Party	Candidate	Votes	%	±%
Labour	Gordon Prentice	25,059	53.3	+9.1
Conservative	John Midgley	14,235	30.3	―10.0
Liberal Democrats	Tony Greaves	5,460	11.6	―3.4
Referendum	Damian Hockney	2,281	4.8	New
Majority		10,824	23.0	+19.1
Turnout		47,035	74.6	―8.3
Labour hold		Swing	+9.6	

General election 1992: Pendle
Party	Candidate	Votes	%	±%
Labour	Gordon Prentice	23,497	44.2	+8.9
Conservative	John Lee	21,384	40.3	―0.1
Liberal Democrats	Alan Davies	7,976	15.0	―9.3
Anti-Federalist League	Valerie Thome	263	0.5	New
Majority		2,113	3.9	N/A
Turnout		53,120	82.9	+1.1
Labour gain from Conservative		Swing	+4.5	

=== Elections in the 1980s ===
General election 1987: Pendle
Party	Candidate	Votes	%	±%
Conservative	John Lee	21,009	40.4	―3.8
Labour	Sylvia Renilson	18,370	35.3	+3.0
Liberal	Gordon Lishman	12,662	24.3	+0.8
Majority		2,639	5.1	―6.8
Turnout		52,041	81.8	+2.1
Conservative hold		Swing	―3.4	

General election 1983: Pendle
Party	Candidate	Votes	%	±%
Conservative	John Lee	22,739	44.2	
Labour	George Rodgers	16,604	32.3	
Liberal	Gordon Lishman	12,056	23.5	
Majority		6,135	11.9	
Turnout		51,399	79.7	
Conservative win (new seat)				

== See also ==
- List of parliamentary constituencies in Lancashire
