= Andrew Stephenson =

British politician (born 1981)

The Right Honourable Andrew Stephenson CBE
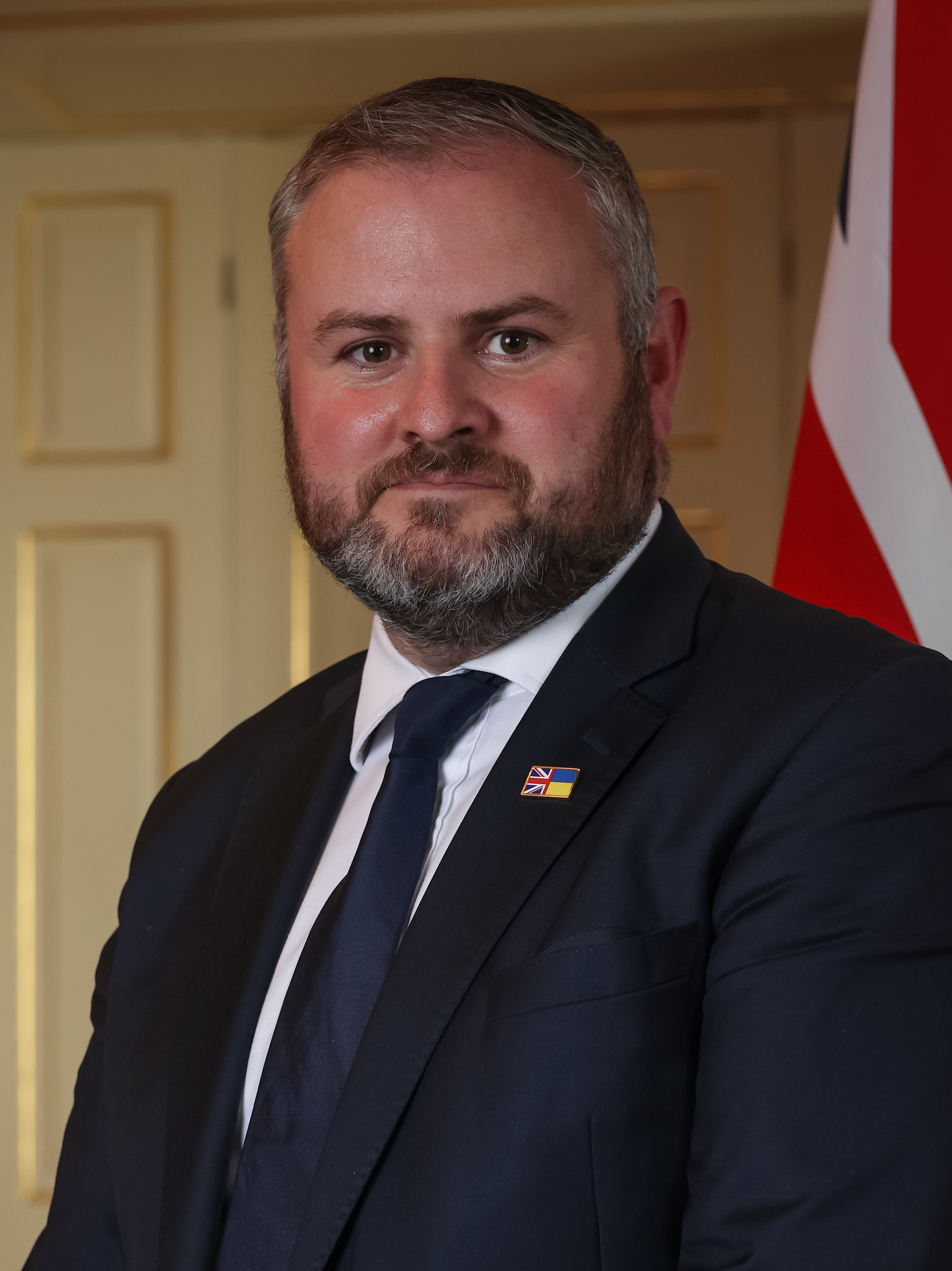
- Official portrait, 2022

Minister of State for Health and Secondary Care
- In office 13 November 2023 – 5 July 2024
- Prime Minister: Rishi Sunak
- Preceded by: Will Quince
- Succeeded by: Karin Smyth

Lord Commissioner of the Treasury
- In office 27 October 2022 – 13 November 2023
- Prime Minister: Rishi Sunak
- In office 9 January 2018 – 26 July 2018
- Prime Minister: Theresa May
- Preceded by: David Evennett
- Succeeded by: Mike Freer

Parliamentary Under-Secretary of State for Housing and Communities
- In office 20 September 2022 – 27 October 2022
- Prime Minister: Liz Truss
- Preceded by: Eddie Hughes
- Succeeded by: Felicity Buchan

Chairman of the Conservative Party Minister without Portfolio
- In office 7 July 2022 – 6 September 2022 Serving with Ben Elliot
- Prime Minister: Boris Johnson
- Preceded by: Oliver Dowden
- Succeeded by: Jake Berry

Minister of State for Transport
- In office 13 February 2020 – 7 July 2022
- Prime Minister: Boris Johnson
- Preceded by: George Freeman
- Succeeded by: Trudy Harrison

Minister of State for Africa and International Development
- In office 25 July 2019 – 13 February 2020
- Prime Minister: Boris Johnson
- Preceded by: Harriett Baldwin
- Succeeded by: James Duddridge

Parliamentary Under-Secretary of State for Business and Industry
- In office 4 April 2019 – 25 July 2019
- Prime Minister: Theresa May
- Preceded by: Richard Harrington
- Succeeded by: Nadhim Zahawi

Vice-Chamberlain of the Household
- In office 26 July 2018 – 4 April 2019
- Prime Minister: Theresa May
- Preceded by: Mark Spencer
- Succeeded by: Craig Whittaker

Member of Parliament for Pendle
- In office 6 May 2010 – 30 May 2024
- Preceded by: Gordon Prentice
- Succeeded by: Constituency abolished

Personal details
- Born: 17 February 1981 (age 45) Manchester, England
- Party: Conservative
- Education: Royal Holloway, University of London
- Occupation: Politician
- Website: Official website

Andrew George Stephenson (born 17 February 1981) is a British former politician who most recently served as Minister of State for Health and Secondary Care from November 2023 to July 2024. A member of the Conservative Party, he was the Member of Parliament (MP) for Pendle in Lancashire from 2010 until 2024.

Stephenson served continuously in different ministerial roles from 2017 to 2024. These roles included Co-Chairman of the Conservative Party and Minister without Portfolio, attending Cabinet, from July to September 2022. He was subsequently appointed as a member of Her Majesty's Most Honourable Privy Council on 8 July, entitling him to the style "The Right Honourable" for life and appointed Commander of the Order of the British Empire (CBE) in the 2023 New Year Honours for political and public service.

== Early life and career ==
Stephenson was born on 17 February 1981 in Manchester, England to Malcolm and Ann Stephenson. His father and grandfather worked for British Rail, in the North East of England, before the family moved to the North West in the 1960s.

He attended Poynton High School, a state comprehensive school. Stephenson was the first in his family to go to university. He studied for a degree in Management Studies at Royal Holloway, University of London, graduating in 2002. He has a Postgraduate Certificate from the University of Derby in Sustainability and Environmental Management, a Master of Science in Engineering Management from the University of Leeds, and he is an Associate of the Chartered Management Institute.

While at school, Stephenson had wanted to become a chef. He took part in the South Trafford College Super Chef competition, was awarded a bronze medal in the Northern Salon culinary competition and participated in the North West Regional Finals of BBC Junior Masterchef.

After graduating from university, Stephenson worked as an insurance broker and later partner at Stephenson & Threader.

Stephenson joined the Conservative Party at the age of 16. He served two terms on the National Executive of Conservative Future and was the organisation's national deputy chairman from 2001 to 2002. He was also the chairman of the Royal Holloway's Conservative Future society from 1999 to 2001. Stephenson climbed the Great Wall of China in September 2008, having raised more than £5,000 for charity.

Stephenson was a councillor for Macclesfield Borough Council from 2003 to 2007. At the age of 25, he became the chair of the Tatton Conservative association, the youngest person to lead a local Conservative association. He was selected as the prospective parliamentary candidate (PPC) for Pendle in September 2006.

== Parliamentary career ==
He was elected in the general election of 2010, with a majority of 3,585 (8.0%) votes. The seat had been previously held by Labour MP Gordon Prentice since 1992. Stephenson delivered his maiden speech in a debate on 'Building a High-Skilled Economy' on 17 June 2010.

On 13 October 2010, Stephenson was one of 37 Conservative MP's to rebel on a motion to approve Britain's EU budget contribution, voting for an amendment which read "is concerned at the above-inflation increase being made to Britain's EU budget contribution; believes that, at a time when the Government is poised to make reductions in public spending elsewhere, it is wrong to increase that contribution; and calls on the Government to reduce Britain's EU budget contribution."

Stephenson served as a Vice Chairman of the Conservative Party for Youth from 2010 to 2013 He was appointed Parliamentary Private Secretary (PPS), to Robert Halfon, Minister without Portfolio and Deputy Chairman of the Conservative Party in 2015. Stephenson later also became PPS to Minister of State for Security Sir John Hayes, and Minister of State for Policing Mike Penning. In July 2016, he became PPS to Foreign Secretary Boris Johnson.

Stephenson voted for the UK to leave the European Union in the 2016 UK Brexit referendum, campaigning with Vote Leave. 63% of Pendle residents voted to leave the EU.

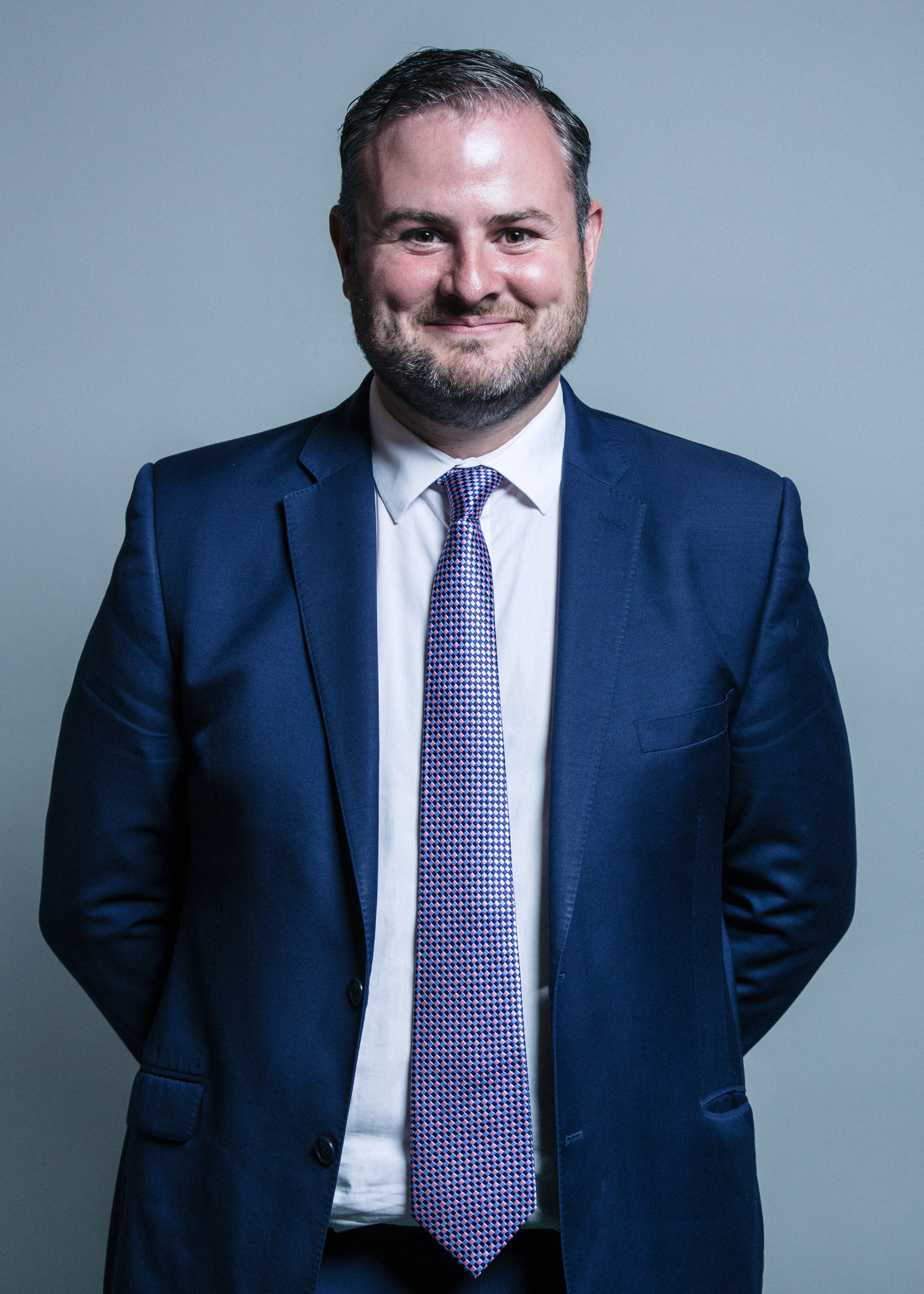
Official portrait, 2017

Following the 2017 general election, Stephenson was appointed as an Assistant Government Whip by Prime Minister Theresa May. In January 2018, Stephenson was promoted to become a Lord Commissioner of HM Treasury in the cabinet reshuffle, before becoming Vice-Chamberlain of the Household in July 2018.

Between January 2018 and April 2019, Stephenson was the Government Pairing Whip, responsible for approving or refusing the absence requests of all Conservative MPs and negotiating 'pairs' with opposition Parties.

In April 2019, Stephenson was appointed Parliamentary Under Secretary of State (Minister for Business and Industry) at the Department for Business, Energy and Industrial Strategy. In this role he was responsible for sectors including aerospace, automotive, materials (including steel), professional and business services, nuclear, infrastructure and construction. Alongside the Secretary of State, he led the government response to British Steel entering administration in May 2019. He was also responsible for Sector Deals and launched the Tourism Sector Deal in June 2019.

Stephenson backed Boris Johnson in the 2019 Conservative Party leadership election and was his North West Regional MP Campaign Co-ordinator.

In July 2019, following the formation of the first Johnson ministry, Stephenson was appointed as Minister of State for Africa and International Development. His first visits to the region were to South Sudan and Uganda. Stephenson was also responsible for UK consular affairs policy globally, which included dealing with issues such as the major repatriation effort following the collapse of Thomas Cook in September 2019.

In February 2020, during the first cabinet reshuffle of the second Johnson ministry, Stephenson was appointed as a Minister of State at the Department for Transport, responsible for HS2, the Transpennine Route Upgrade and Northern Powerhouse Rail projects. His appointment came after Prime Minister Boris Johnson said he would appoint a Minister to "restore discipline" to HS2. In his first speech on HS2, which he made in Manchester, Stephenson set out how he would get the project back on track, with monthly cross-government meetings like those that were put in place for the Olympics. His speech was welcomed by many supporters of the project including the Yorkshire Post, who said, "Stephenson's rocket will fire up HS2 at last". In November 2021, the Integrated Rail Plan for the North and Midlands, the biggest ever government investment in Britain's rail network was unveiled and in March 2022, Stephenson confirmed that HS2 was supporting over 22,000 jobs.

Stephenson served as Co-Chairman of the Conservative Party and Minister without Portfolio, attending Cabinet, from July to September 2022. He was Parliamentary Under Secretary of State at the Department for Levelling Up, Housing and Communities from 20 September 2022 to 27 October 2022. He returned to the Government Whips office as Lord Commissioner of HM Treasury from 27 October 2022 to 13 November 2023, before being appointed Minister of State for Health and Secondary Care.

On 19 July 2022, Stephenson was sworn in as a member of the Privy Council, becoming the 1,336th and final person, to be sworn during the reign of Elizabeth II.

Stephenson was appointed Commander of the Order of the British Empire (CBE) in the 2023 New Year Honours for political and public service.

In the 2024 general election, he stood in Pendle and Clitheroe but lost to Labour's Jonathan Hinder.

== Constituency campaigns ==
On 12 October 2010, less than six months after being first elected, Stephenson led a debate in the House of Commons which focused on the murder of three Pendle residents—Mohammed Yousaf, Pervez Yousaf and Tania Yousaf—who were killed in Pakistan on 20 May 2010. Over 100 Pendle residents travelled to London to watch the debate from the public gallery. Stephenson maintains an interest in the case often raising it with the British and Pakistani Authorities. Stephenson served as the Chairman of the Pakistan All Party Parliamentary Group 2010–2015.

On 28 June 2011, Stephenson proposed his first piece of legislation, The Bail (Amendment) Bill. The Private Members Bill sought to create a right of appeal against Crown Court bail decisions and followed the murder of his constituent, Jane Clough, by her partner who was out on bail. Working with Jane's parents, John and Penny Clough MBE, Stephenson was successful in getting the law changed and this additional safeguard was introduced in 2012.

In September 2014, Stephenson was involved in setting up an All Party Parliamentary Group for Water Safety and Drowning Prevention, following the accidental death of one of his constituents.

Stephenson holds an annual Job Fair at Colne Muni and campaigned for a National Living Wage, which was introduced in 2016. He has long championed the regeneration of Brierfield Mills, helping secure millions of pounds to bring the site into public ownership and enable its £32 million transformation into 'Northlight'. In 2019 Prime Minister Theresa May visited Pendle to open the £4.5 million 'Leisure Box' which is part of the redevelopment.

Stephenson has also campaigned for more transport investment in Pendle. In April 2017, he led a House of Commons debate on re-opening the Colne to Skipton Railway line and in 2018 secured a government feasibility study into this "missing link". Stephenson has also been vocal about traffic congestion in Colne, and in 2019 he secured another study into looking at possible solutions. Stephenson successfully campaigned for action to be taken to tackle flooding on the M65, work that was undertaken in early 2020. In September 2020, a £1 million scheme to improve congestion through Colne, funded by the Department for Transport's national productivity infrastructure fund, got underway.

Stephenson has campaigned for more funding for local NHS services. In 2014, a new Health Centre opened in Colne and a new Accident and Emergency Department at Airedale Hospital. In 2023, the Health Secretary announced that Airedale Hospital would be totally rebuilt and paid tribute to Stephenson and other local MPs. Meanwhile, more than £60 million of improvements have been made at Burnley General Teaching Hospital, including the £15 million Phase 8 development which opened in 2019.

In response to the 2020 COVID-19 pandemic, Stephenson spent over 1,000 hours volunteering with the North West Ambulance Service and as a COVID-19 vaccinator. In March 2021, whilst working as a volunteer vaccinator at Blackburn Cathedral, Stephenson vaccinated Deputy Speaker of the House of Commons Nigel Evans MP. In June 2022, he received the Queen Elizabeth II Platinum Jubilee Medal for his NHS volunteering.

Stephenson has secured the visits of number of high-profile politicians to Pendle during his time as the MP. As Prime Minister David Cameron visited Hope Technology in Barnoldswick in 2013, ACDC in Barrowford in 2015, and Silentnight in Barnoldswick for a Q&A with the workforce in 2016. Prime Minister Rishi Sunak visited the Pendle Hippodrome Theatre in Colne in 2023. He also had then-Mayor of London Boris Johnson pulling pints in the Alma Inn in Colne in 2015.

In 2019, he took part in a Charity Sleep out on top of Pendle Hill to raise money for a local homelessness charity.

Post politics he has focused on healthcare, serving as the Chair of the University Hospitals of Morecambe Bay NHS Trust, as well as Chairing the Health, Care and Life Sciences Research Group Advisory Board or policy institute Curia. He is also the public affairs lead for Leeds-based Tarleton Communications, whose clients are largely in the science sector: life sciences, medtech, bio-tech, science parks and engineering.

== Post-parliamentary career ==
Following his defeat at the 2024 UK General Election, Stephenson has been appointed as Managing Partner at Polaris Partners, Public Affairs Lead at both Taleron and Desmos, a senior advisor at Curia's Health, and Chair of the Care and Life Sciences Research Group at University Hospitals of Morecambe Bay NHS Foundation Trust.

== Personal life ==
Stephenson has spoken openly about how his own health problems, including a gangrenous appendix in 2014, and having his gallbladder removed in 2016, led him to become a volunteer community first responder with North West Ambulance Service, providing life-saving care before an ambulance arrives.

Parliament of the United Kingdom
Preceded by Gordon Prentice	Member of Parliament for Pendle; 2010–2024	Constituency abolished
Political offices
Preceded by Oliver Dowden	Minister without Portfolio; 2022	Succeeded by Jake Berry
Party political offices
Preceded by Oliver Dowden	Chairman of the Conservative Party; 2022	Succeeded by Jake Berry
