= Richard Martin-Bird =

Sir Richard Martin-Bird CBE TD DL
- Born: 19 July 1910
- Died: 3 December 1992 (aged 82)
- Allegiance: United Kingdom
- Branch: British Army
- Service years: 1939–1956
- Rank: Colonel
- Commands: 127th (Manchester) Brigade
- Conflicts: Second World War
- Awards: Knight Bachelor, Commander of the Order of the British Empire, Efficiency Decoration

Colonel Sir Richard Dawnay Martin-Bird CBE TD DL (19 July 1910 – 3 December 1992) was a British Army officer who was Vice-Chairman of the Territorial, Auxiliary and Volunteer Reserve Association.

Martin-Bird was educated at Charterhouse School and worked in the family business after leaving school. On 29 April 1939 he was commissioned into a Territorial Army battalion of the Manchester Regiment. During the Second World War he served with the regiment in Malta, the Middle East and Italy. Following the war, on 1 May 1947 he was promoted to lieutenant-colonel and took command of the 8th Battalion of the Manchester Regiment. He was awarded the Efficiency Decoration on 3 November 1950. In 1953 Martin-Bird was promoted to colonel and took command of 127th (Manchester) Brigade, retiring from the Army in 1956.

He was made an Aide-de-Camp to Elizabeth II in June 1961 and became a Deputy Lieutenant for Lancashire in August 1964. In 1969 he was made honorary colonel of his former battalion. He was made a Commander of the Order of the British Empire in the 1971 New Year Honours and a Knight Bachelor in the 1975 Birthday Honours in recognition of his work in the Territorial, Auxiliary and Volunteer Reserve Association. Martin-Bird served as High Sheriff of Greater Manchester in 1976. He was a Director and Chairman of Yates's and was President of the Wine and Spirit Trade Association between 1978 and 1979.
