= Noel McFarlane =

Irish footballer (1934–2019)

Personal information
- Full name: William Noel McFarlane
- Date of birth: 20 December 1934
- Place of birth: Bray, County Wicklow, Ireland
- Date of death: 19 March 2019 (aged 84)
- Height: 5 ft 8 in (1.73 m)
- Position: Forward

Youth career
- 1952–1953: Manchester United

Senior career*
Years	Team	Apps	(Gls)
1953–1956	Manchester United	1	(0)
1956–?	Waterford		
- Altrincham

International career
- Republic of Ireland Schoolboys
- * Club domestic league appearances and goals

William Noel McFarlane (20 December 1934 – 19 March 2019) was an Irish footballer who played as a forward. Born in Bray, County Wicklow, he played junior football in Ireland before moving to England to join Manchester United in 1952. After four years in England, he returned to Ireland with Waterford before briefly retiring due to illness, only to return to England to play non-league football with Altrincham.

== Career ==
McFarlane was born in Bray, County Wicklow, and played junior football in the area, earning a call-up to the Republic of Ireland Schoolboys national team. In April 1952, he signed for English club Manchester United, joining a youth team filled with players known as the Busby Babes after the club's manager, Matt Busby. McFarlane was a regular for the youth team during the 1952–53 season, and played in both legs of the inaugural FA Youth Cup final in 1953, scoring twice in a 7–1 win in the first leg, leading to a 9–3 victory on aggregate.

Despite being a mainstay in the youth team, McFarlane was unable to displace Johnny Berry in the senior side and did not make his first-team debut until February 1954, playing on the right wing in a 2–0 home win over Tottenham Hotspur. It was to be his only appearance for the club, with Colin Webster preferred as Berry's understudy, and in June 1956, McFarlane returned to Ireland to play for Waterford. A knee injury forced him to retire, but he did later return to play non-league football in the Manchester area with Altrincham and Hyde United.

== Personal life ==
Noel's son Ross was a professional golfer.
