= Netar Mallick =

English professor emeritus of renal medicine

Professor Sir Netar Mallick DL FRCP FRCPE

Academic background
- Education: Victoria University of Manchester

Sir Netar Prakash Mallick (born 3 August 1935) is a British nephrologist who is professor emeritus of renal medicine at the University of Manchester.

Mallick was born in Blackburn and educated at Queen Elizabeth's Grammar School and the Victoria University of Manchester, where he served as president of the students' union in 1958–1959. He spent a year as a research fellow in surgery at Harvard University, then held resident appointments at Manchester Royal Infirmary and Withington Hospital Manchester. Mallick took charge of the department of renal medicine at Manchester Royal Infirmary in 1973. He was appointed professor of renal medicine at the University of Manchester in 1994.

Mallick was president of the British Renal Society from 1988 to 1990, and of the Renal Association from 1998 until 1991. He was awarded a knighthood in the 1998 Birthday Honours for his work on kidney treatment and kidney transplantation. He served as High Sheriff of Greater Manchester in 2002–2003. He was President of the Manchester Literary and Philosophical Society in 2016.

== Personal life ==
Mallick married in 1960 and has three daughters.

Honorary titles
Preceded by Lady Joyce Montgomery	High Sheriff of Greater Manchester; 2002–3	Succeeded by Sue Hodgkiss
Professional and academic associations
Preceded by L. J. R. Postle	President of the Manchester Literary and Philosophical Society; 1985–87	Succeeded by B. S. H. Rarity
Preceded by K. M. Letherman	President of the Manchester Literary and Philosophical Society; 2014–16	Succeeded by Diana M. Leitch
