= Peter Russell (footballer) =

English footballer (born 1935)

Personal information
- Full name: William Peter Russell
- Date of birth: 16 January 1935 (age 91)
- Place of birth: Gornal, England
- Position: Centre half

Youth career
- Wolverhampton Wanderers

Senior career*
Years	Team	Apps	(Gls)
1952–1956	Wolverhampton Wanderers	3	(0)
1956–1959	Notts County	106	(6)
1959–1961	Hereford United		
1961–1963	Addington		
1963–1964	Durban City		
1964–1965	Addington		
Total		109+	(6+)
- * Club domestic league appearances and goals

William Peter Russell (born 16 January 1935) is an English former professional footballer who played as a centre half.

== Career ==
Born in Gornal, Russell played for Wolverhampton Wanderers, Notts County, Hereford United, Addington and Durban City.
