= Les Cocker (footballer, born 1939) =

English footballer

Personal information
- Full name: Leslie James Robert Cocker
- Date of birth: 18 September 1939
- Place of birth: Wolverhampton, England
- Date of death: February 2017 (aged 77)
- Place of death: Newport, Shropshire, England
- Position: Wing half

Youth career
- 1956–1958: Wolverhampton Wanderers

Senior career*
Years	Team	Apps	(Gls)
1958–1961	Wolverhampton Wanderers	1	(0)
1961–1966	Wellington Town		
1966–1968	Arcadia Shepherds		
1968–1969	Hereford United		
1969–????	Kidderminster Harriers		
Total		1	(0)
- * Club domestic league appearances and goals

Leslie James Robert Cocker (18 September 1939 – February 2017) was an English professional footballer who played as a wing half. He played one game in the Football League for Wolverhampton Wanderers.

== Career ==
Born in Wolverhampton, Cocker began his career in the youth team of Wolverhampton Wanderers in 1956, playing in their 1958 FA Youth Cup triumph. He turned professional in Summer 1958 and eventually made his senior debut on 4 February 1961 in a 2–1 defeat at Blackburn Rovers. This turned out to be his only appearance for Wolves' first team and he was released at the end of the season.

He joined local non-league side Wellington Town immediately after, playing in over 200 games during the 1960–61 season. After breaking a collar bone, he left and relocated to South Africa in February 1966 for a two-and-a-half-year spell with the Arcadia Shepherds, in which he was the club's top scorer. He then returned to England when he signed on with Hereford United.

In 1969, he appeared as a substitute for Kidderminster Harriers in an FA Cup tie against Telford United at the latter's Bucks Head ground.

In later life he lived at Newport, Shropshire until the time of his death in February 2017, aged 77.
