= Dungworth =

Hamlet in South Yorkshire, England

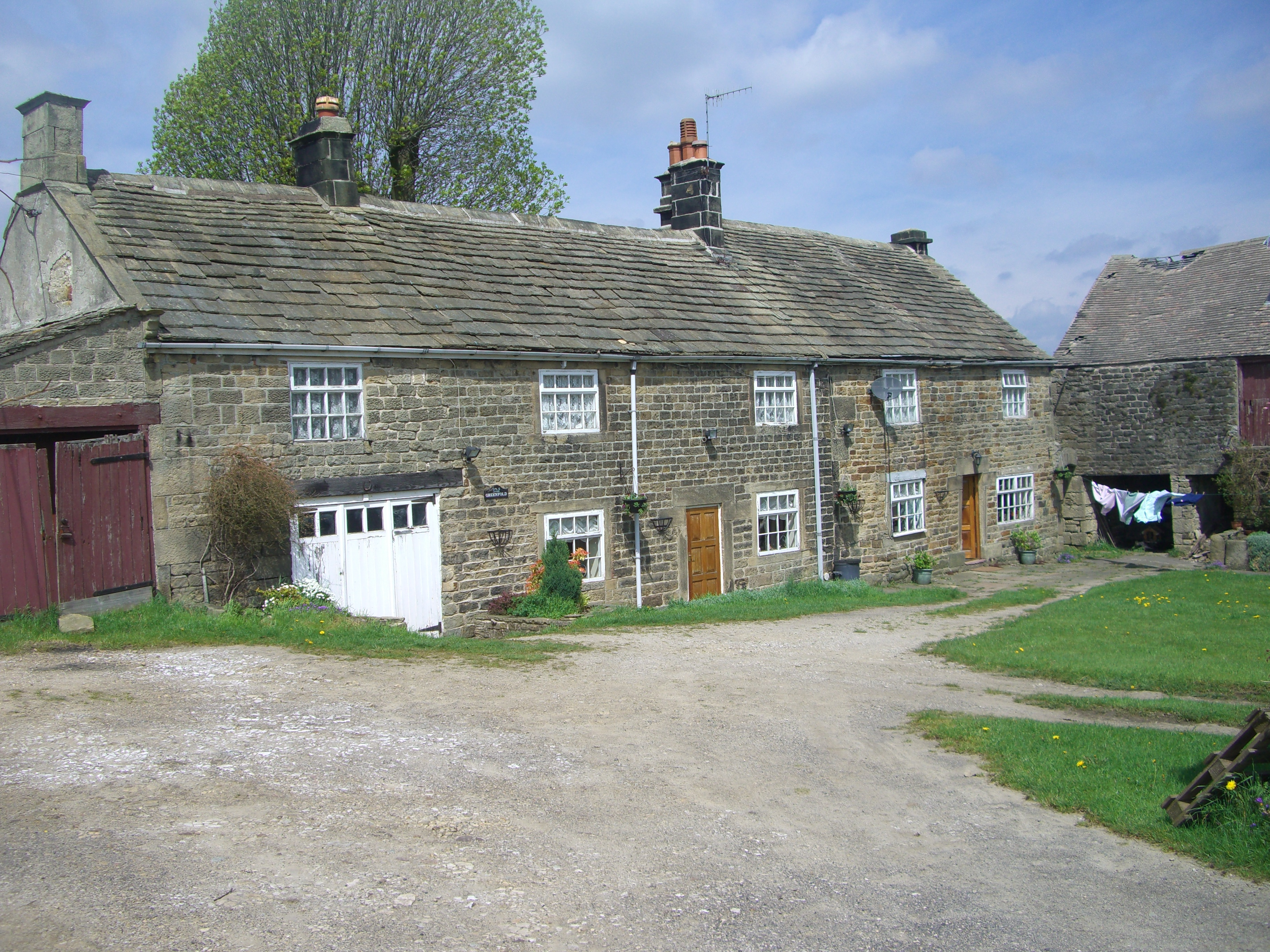
- Green Fold Farmhouse

- Location within South Yorkshire
- Civil parish: Bradfield
- Metropolitan borough: Sheffield
- Metropolitan county: South Yorkshire
- Region: Yorkshire and the Humber
- Country: England
- Sovereign state: United Kingdom
- Post town: SHEFFIELD
- Postcode district: S6
- Dialling code: 0114
- Police: South Yorkshire
- Fire: South Yorkshire
- Ambulance: Yorkshire
- UK Parliament: Sheffield Hallam

Dungworth (archaic Dungeworth,) is a hamlet in the civil parish of Bradfield, west of Sheffield in South Yorkshire, England.

The village also gives its name as a surname; a 'Dungworth' is recorded living at the nearby village of Storrs in 1323. In the late 20th century the English occurrences of the surname remained concentrated in the Sheffield area.

== Modern geography and economy ==
Dungworth is a hamlet located approximately 1.25 miles (2 km) west of Stannington and the outermost suburbs of Sheffield in agricultural high ground at around 200 m (660 ft) above sea level. It is 500 yards (0.5 km) south of the eastern end of Damflask reservoir. The village has a primary school Bradfield Dungworth School, and a public house, the Royal Hotel.

=== Social geography ===
The village pub has long been a centre of village life, games of Knurr and Spell were played in the 1920s and there were clubs for fishing, running, football and cricket. At Christmas time people have sung local songs in the pub for over 200 years, although this tradition is under threat with the possible closure of the pub in 2024.

The village has a school "Bradfield Dungworth School" and a community hall.

== History ==
A medieval cross, Dungworth Cross was once located northwest of the village. (grid reference SK 2780 9036)

Dungworth has a long tradition of dairy farming, and at one time there were eight dairy farms in the area, each delivering their own milk to the surrounding district, but this has been significantly reduced in recent years. A cruck barn at Briers House farm once used as a cowhouse and hayloft dates from the 16th century.

Manufacture of knives took place in Dungworth in the 17th and 18th centuries; the nearby 'Sykehouse' (c. 1800) at Syke House farm has hearths and workshop dating from the period. The census of 1861 shows a large number of men in the Dungworth, Hill Top and Storrs area who combined farming with the production of knives in small workshops attached to their cottages. Coal was mined near Dungworth up to the 19th century; it was found in association with ganister.

There are several historic buildings within the village dating from the 18th century; Green Fold farm dates from the early 18th century, and Padley farmhouse (converted to three cottages, formerly 'Dungworth Hall'.), dates from the mid 18th century.

The village pub dates to 1813, parts of the village primary school date from the 1840s. A Primitive Methodist chapel was built in the village around 1850; the anniversary of the church's founding in June of each year was a highlight of village social life in the early and mid 20th century.

Ringwood House on Main Road was once a butcher's shop and had arched cellars used for storing meat, it continued as a grocery shop until the 1970s, known as "Harper's Shop".

Some additional housing was built around the village in the mid 20th century: on the road to Dungworth cross (1920/30s), and later (1956) several council houses were built on Dungworth Green (road). In 1985 the local school amalgamated with Low Bradfield Junior and Infants' School to form the present Bradfield Dungworth School on Dungworth Green. Dungworth Green Community Hall, adjoining the school was opened in 2011.

Two professional footballers are associated with Dungworth: Cec Coldwell (b. 1929) was born in here, while Tony Hawksworth (b. 1938) grew up here.

== Load Brook ==
53.39433°N 1.59235°W

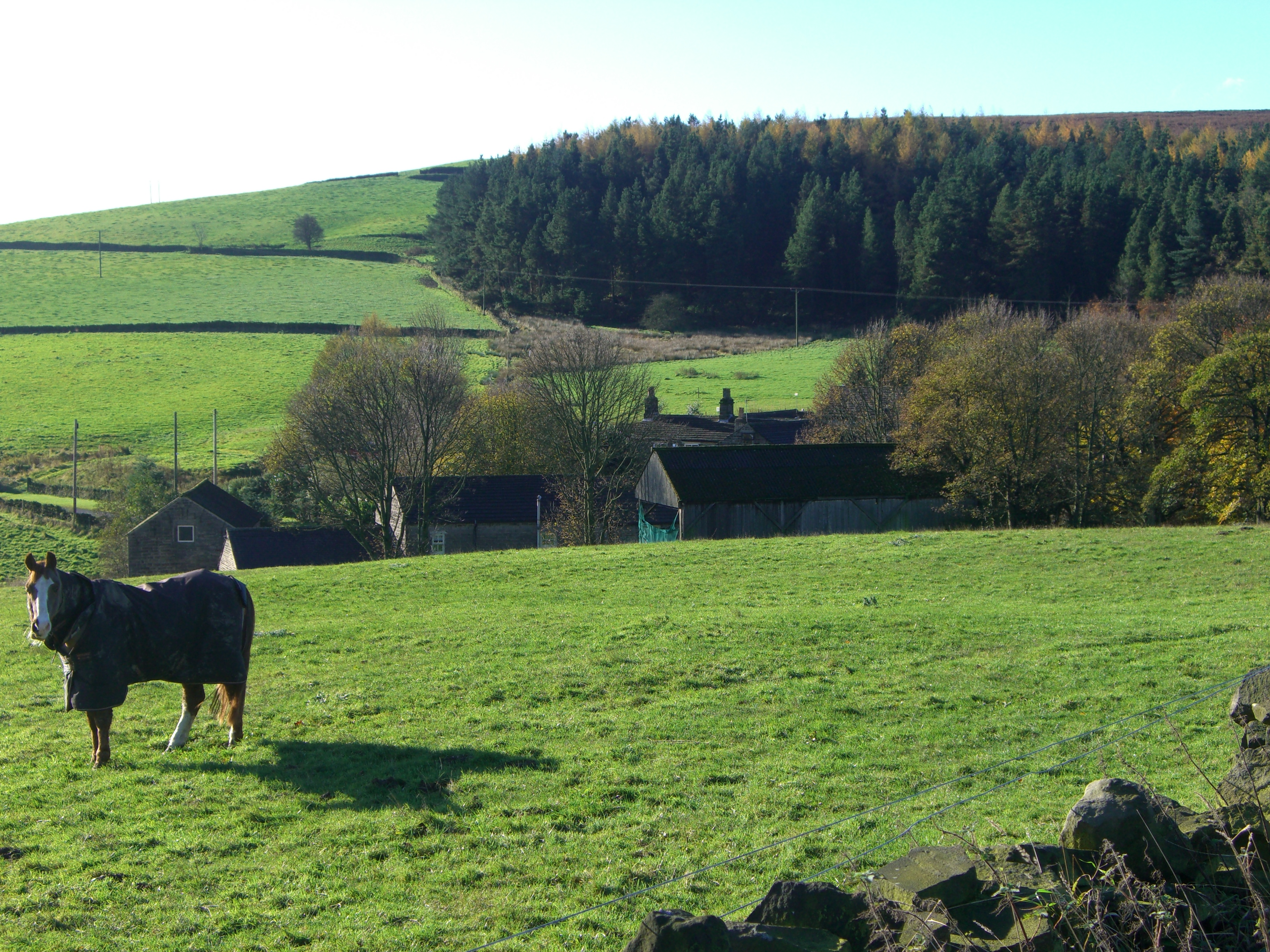
Load Brook seen from the east, the coniferous plantation in the background is the site of the old mine

The hamlet of Load Brook is located about 1.25 miles (2 km) roughly southwest of Dungworth at around 295 m (968 ft) above sea level.

Load Brook was developed from a farm to a minor industrial site in the late 19th and early 20th centuries. A "pot clay" mine (pot clay – a type of fireclay from the Stannington pot clay bed) was developed to the southwest in the 1850s by William Trickett, a local farmer. Trickett obtained rights to mine pot clay from the landowner, the Duke of Norfolk in 1852 and was mentioned in the Sheffield Trade Directory of 1862 as a clay merchant. William Trickett died in 1890 and the business was continued by his three sons, William, Benjamin and Matthew under the name of B. Trickett & Co.

The mine was officially named the Intake Clay Pit and had four drift entrances going into the hillside; one of these is still visible as is the path of the former tramway which had stone foundations. Ponies were used to pull the wagons from the mine along the tramway to the brick works, which had two rock crushers and three coal fired brick kilns. Cottages were built at the site to house the workers. Facilities included a works ~100 SW of the hamlet and a track and tramway northward from the works, at around the 300 to 350 m (980 to 1,150 ft) mark.

The mine was later taken over by Thomas Wragg & Sons who had a business in the Loxley valley making refractory bricks; the mine and works closed in the 1950s. In the second half of the 20th century the site and surrounding land was gradually used for forestry. As of 2010 the former industrial use was marked by field boundaries, and remains of the trackways.

=== Present day ===
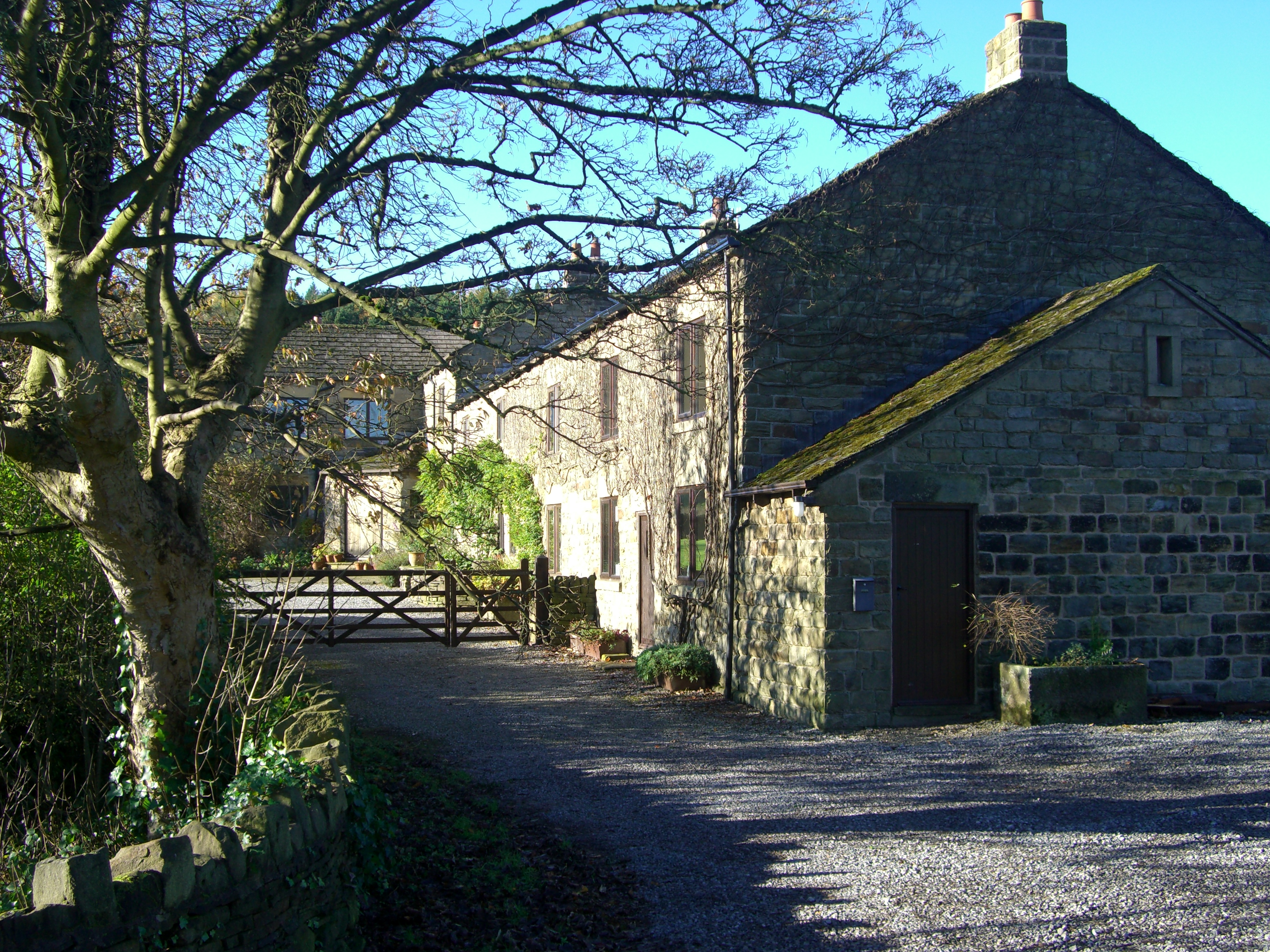
Load Brook Cottages, are former miners cottages that have been converted into holiday accommodation

Some of the former workmen’s cottages have been developed into modern private residences. Loadbrook Cottages has been refurbished into bed and breakfast accommodation and a self-catering holiday cottage. Loadbrook House is also now a holiday cottage, while the original Loadbrook Farm, dating from the 18th century also offers bed and breakfast accommodation. Other buildings in the hamlet include, Loadbrook Barn, Brook Cottage, Heather Bank and Beeton Farm which stands just to the south of the hamlet.
