= Reg Hunter =

Welsh footballer

Personal information
- Full name: John Reginald Hunter
- Date of birth: 25 October 1938 (age 88)
- Place of birth: Colwyn Bay, Wales
- Height: 5 ft 8 in (1.73 m)
- Position: Forward

Youth career
- ?–1956: Colwyn Bay

Senior career*
Years	Team	Apps	(Gls)
1956–1960	Manchester United	1	(0)
1960–1962	Wrexham	34	(3)
- Bangor City
- * Club domestic league appearances and goals

John Reginald Hunter (born 25 October 1938) is a former Welsh footballer. His regular position was as a forward. He was born in Colwyn Bay, Denbighshire (now Conwy). He played for Colwyn Bay, Manchester United, Wrexham, Bangor City, and Borough United.
