= Harold Bratt =

English footballer (1939–2018)

Harold Bratt (8 October 1939 – 8 October 2018) was an English footballer. His regular position was at full back. He was born in Salford, Lancashire. He played for Manchester United and Doncaster Rovers.

Bratt died on his birthday 79th birthday on 8 October 2018.
