= Barry Hughes =

Welsh footballer and manager (1937–2019)

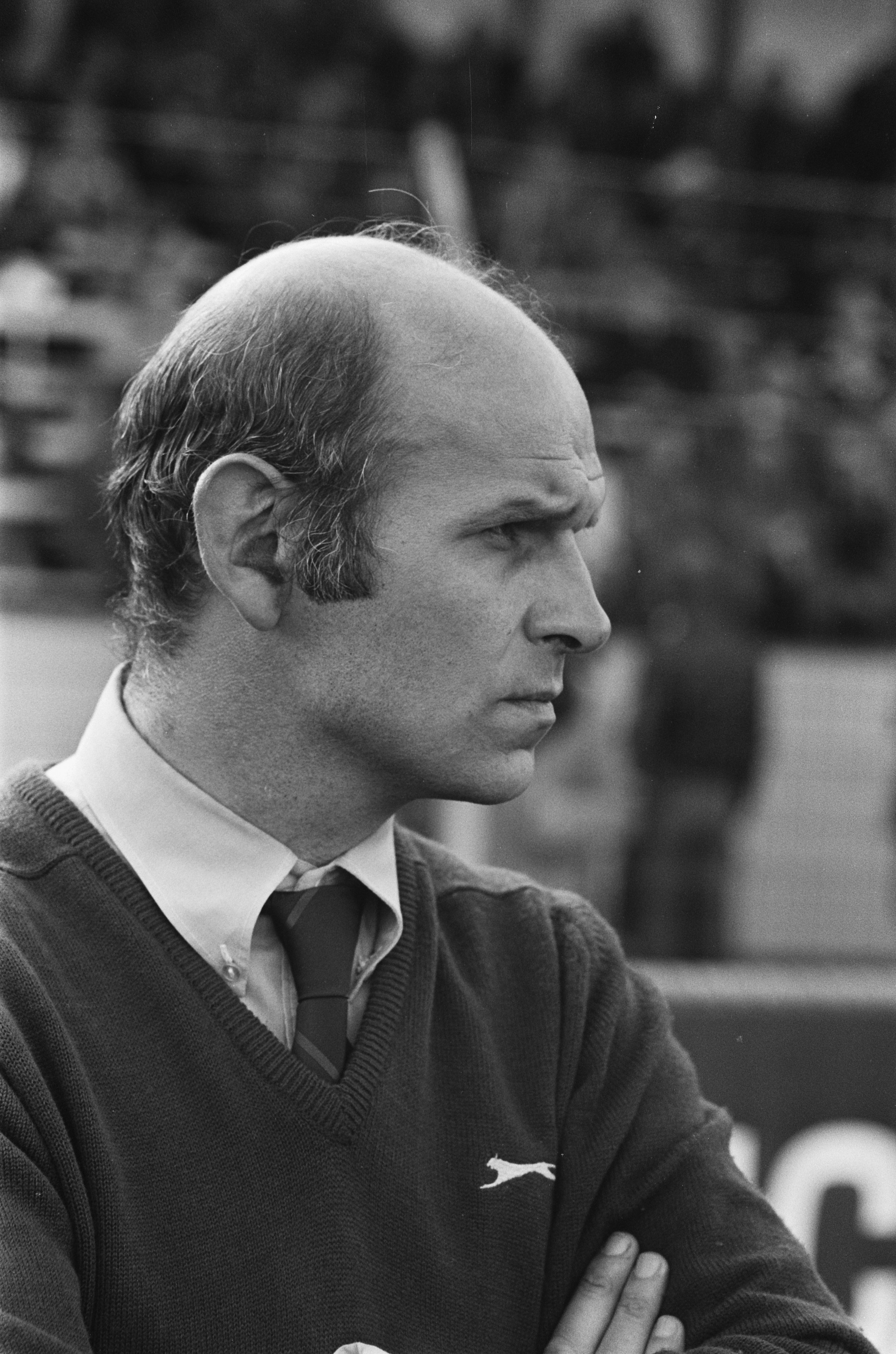
- Hughes in 1976

Personal information
- Date of birth: 31 December 1937
- Place of birth: Caernarfon, Wales
- Date of death: 2 June 2019 (aged 81)
- Place of death: Amsterdam, Netherlands
- Position: Defender

Youth career
- 1953–1960: West Bromwich Albion

Senior career*
Years	Team	Apps	(Gls)
1960–1963	Blauw-Wit	58	(1)
1963–1965	Alkmaar '54		

Managerial career
- 1965–1967: Alkmaar '54
- 1968–1970: HFC Haarlem
- 1970–1973: Go Ahead Eagles
- 1973–1980: HFC Haarlem
- 1980–1983: Sparta Rotterdam
- 1983–1984: FC Utrecht
- 1984–1985: MVV
- 1985–1986: FC Volendam
- 1986–1988: Sparta Rotterdam
- 1988–1989: Beerschot
- * Club domestic league appearances and goals

Barry Hughes (31 December 1937 – 2 June 2019) was a Welsh professional football player and manager, active primarily in the Netherlands. He played as a defender.

== Early and personal life ==
Hughes was born in Caernarfon. He attended Glyndwr Secondary Modern school. In 1965 he married Elles Berger, a Dutch TV personality. The couple had three daughters and six grandchildren.

== Playing career ==
Hughes began his career with the youth team of English team West Bromwich Albion, but left after six years, without making a first-team appearance in the Football League. He played in the Netherlands for Blauw-Wit, from 1960 to 1963, and for Alkmaar '54 from 1963 to 1965. He was captain of Alkmaar.

== Coaching career ==
After retiring as a player, Hughes began his coaching career in 1965 with Alkmaar '54. He later managed a variety of Dutch club sides including HFC Haarlem, Go Ahead Eagles, Sparta Rotterdam, FC Utrecht, MVV and FC Volendam. While managing Haarlem in 1978, Hughes signed young player Ruud Gullit to his first ever professional football contract.

He also managed Belgian club Beerschot.

== Music career ==
Hughes released a 7" music single in 1978 called "Voetbal is Koning" (Football is king).

In 1981, he released another single together with "De Kwaffeurs". The song is called "Ik wil op mijn kop een kamerbreed tapijt" ("I want on my head a wall to wall carpet"), a carnival song referencing his baldness. It was in the Dutch top 40 for eight weeks, where it reached place 7 between week 7 and 8 in 1981.

== Death ==
Hughes died in Amsterdam on 2 June 2019, aged 81.
