= Charles Rowlands =

- Full name: Charles Foster Rowlands
- Born: 13 June 1899 Merthyr Tydfil, Wales
- Died: 10 November 1958 (aged 59) Morriston, Wales

Rugby union career
- Position: Wing
International career
| Years | Team | Apps | (Points) |
| 1926 | Wales | 1 | (0) |

Charles Foster Rowlands (13 June 1899 – 10 November 1958) was a Welsh international rugby union player.

== Rugby career ==
A wing three–quarter, Rowlands was capped for Wales via Aberavon. He replaced George Andrews in the Welsh XV for their penultimate 1926 Five Nations fixture against Ireland at Swansea. After picking up a knee injury in a club match, Rowlands wasn't available for the subsequent fixture in Paris and announced his retirement later that year.

== Personal life ==
Rowlands got married in 1931.

== See also ==
- List of Wales national rugby union players
