= Gordon Clayton (footballer, born 1936) =

English footballer

Gordon Clayton (born 3 November 1936 – 29 September 1991) was an English footballer. His regular position was as a goalkeeper. He was born at Wednesbury, Staffordshire (now in the West Midlands).

He made one appearance for the Manchester United first team in the 1956-57 season, having graduated from the youth team at Old Trafford and signing as an apprentice around the same time as Dudley born Duncan Edwards in the early 1950s. He represented the club at the funerals of Edwards and the seven other United players who died as a result of the Munich air disaster in February 1958.

Clayton was sold to Tranmere Rovers for £4,000 in 1959, but played just a few times for the Wirral club before dropping out of league football. He later played for Sankeys of Wellington, Altrincham and Radcliffe Borough before retiring due to arthritis.

He later returned to Old Trafford as a scout under the management of Wilf McGuinness (who had also played for United at the same time as Clayton) and later worked in a variety of managerial, coaching and scouting for a succession of other clubs.

His last role in football was as assistant manager of Northwich Victoria in the Football Conference. He was appointed to this role in August 1991, but died suddenly from a heart attack only a few weeks later, at the age of 54.
