= Peter Jones (footballer, born 1937) =

English footballer

Personal information
- Full name: Peter Jones
- Date of birth: 30 November 1937 (age 88)
- Place of birth: Salford, Lancashire, England
- Position: Defender

Youth career
- 1954–1955: Manchester United

Senior career*
Years	Team	Apps	(Gls)
1955–1958	Manchester United	1	(0)
1959–1966	Wrexham	226	(7)
1966–1968	Stockport County	54	(1)
- Altrincham
- * Club domestic league appearances and goals as of 15:50, 15 March 2018 (UTC)

Ernest Peter Jones (born 30 November 1937) is an English former footballer who played as a full-back.
