= Reg Holland =

English footballer (1940–2019)

Personal information
- Full name: Eric Reginald Holland
- Date of birth: 23 January 1940
- Place of birth: Stanton Hill, Sutton-in-Ashfield, England
- Date of death: 3 January 2019 (aged 78)
- Height: 5 ft 10 in (1.78 m)
- Position: Full back

Youth career
- 1955–1957: Manchester United

Senior career*
Years	Team	Apps	(Gls)
1957–1960	Manchester United	0	(0)
1960–1966	Wrexham	118	(0)
1966	Chester	6	(0)
1966–?	Altrincham		

International career
	England Youth	8	(?)
	England Schoolboys	4	(?)
- * Club domestic league appearances and goals

Eric Reginald "Reg" Holland (23 January 1940 – 3 January 2019) was an English footballer who played as a full back.

== Playing career ==
Holland enjoyed a promising start to his football career by being selected to play for England Schoolboys and England Youth while twice winning the FA Youth Cup with Manchester United. Despite captaining the club's reserve side, Holland never made a league appearance at Old Trafford although he was an unused substitute on three occasions.

In March 1960, he moved to Wrexham for £2,000, going on to spend six years with the North Wales side before joining local rivals Chester in March 1966. After six league appearances he dropped into Non-League football with Altrincham.

After retiring from football, he joined the Staffordshire Police and spent 27 years with the force before retiring in 1994.

Holland died on 3 January 2019 at the age of 78.

== Honours ==
Manchester United

- FA Youth Cup (2): 1955–56, 1956–57
