= Ivan Beswick =

English footballer (1936–2012)

Personal information
- Date of birth: 2 January 1936
- Place of birth: New Moston, Manchester, England
- Date of death: 4 June 2012 (aged 76)
- Place of death: Saint Martin, Guernsey
- Position: Full-back

Youth career
- 1952–1957: Manchester United

Senior career*
Years	Team	Apps	(Gls)
1958–1960	Oldham Athletic	47	(0)
- Stalybridge Celtic
Total		47+	(0+)
- * Club domestic league appearances and goals

Ivan Beswick (2 January 1936 – 4 June 2012) was an English footballer who played as a full-back.

== Club career ==
Born in New Moston, Manchester, Beswick was signed as a sixteen year old by Manchester United in 1952. After appearing in the FA Youth Cup alongside Manchester United legends Duncan Edwards, David Pegg and Eddie Colman, Beswick was released by coach Jimmy Murphy in 1957, having collapsed for a third time due to internal bleeding caused by a perforated ulcer.

After surgery to remove the ulcers, Beswick joined Oldham Athletic in 1958, and went on to make 49 appearances in all competitions. He later played for Stalybridge Celtic.

== Personal life ==
Following his retirement, Beswick went on to study engineering at The University of Manchester and University of Salford. He founded Safeline, a metal detector company, in 1988.

He died on 4 June 2012 after suffering a stroke.
