= Barry Griffiths (footballer, born 1940) =

English footballer

Personal information
- Date of birth: 21 November 1940 (age 85)
- Place of birth: Manchester, England
- Position: Goalkeeper

Youth career
- Sheffield Wednesday
- –1959: Blackburn Rovers

Senior career*
Years	Team	Apps	(Gls)
1959–1963	Blackburn Rovers	2	(0)
1963–	Altrincham		
- * Club domestic league appearances and goals

Barry Griffiths (born 21 November 1940) is an English former footballer who played as a goalkeeper.

Griffiths moved from Sheffield Wednesday to Blackburn Rovers as a youth and played in the 1958–59 FA Youth Cup Final.

He made two senior appearances for Rovers, before moving to Altrincham.
