= Alan Rhodes (footballer) =

English footballer

Personal information
- Full name: Alan Rhodes
- Date of birth: 5 January 1946 (age 80)
- Place of birth: Bradford, England
- Position: Wing half

Senior career*
Years	Team	Apps	(Gls)
- Salts
1964–1965	Bradford City	7	(0)
- Bradford (Park Avenue)
- Ossett Albion
- * Club domestic league appearances and goals

Alan Rhodes (born 5 January 1946) is an English former professional footballer who played as a wing half.

== Career ==
Born in Bradford, Rhodes joined Bradford City from Salts in July 1964. He made 7 league and 2 cup appearances for the club, before moving to Bradford (Park Avenue) in October 1965. He later played for Ossett Albion.

== Sources ==
- Frost, Terry (1988). Bradford City A Complete Record 1903-1988. Breedon Books Sport. ISBN 0-907969-38-0.
