= Bryce Fulton =

Scottish footballer

Personal information
- Date of birth: 7 August 1935
- Place of birth: Kilwinning, Scotland
- Date of death: 1976 (aged 40–41)
- Position: Full back

Senior career*
Years	Team	Apps	(Gls)
1953–1957	Manchester United	0	(0)
1957–1964	Plymouth Argyle	176	(0)
1964–1966	Exeter City	37	(0)
Total		213	(0)
- * Club domestic league appearances and goals

Bryce Fulton (born 7 August 1935) was a Scottish footballer who played as a full back. He made 213 appearances in the Football League for Plymouth Argyle and Exeter City. He also played for Manchester United.

== Life and career ==
Fulton was born in Kilwinning. He joined Manchester United in 1953, where he played regularly for the club's reserve team but did not make a first team appearance. Fulton was transferred to Plymouth Argyle in 1957 and made 193 appearances in all competitions over the next seven years, including 14 in the 1958–59 season when Argyle won the Football League Third Division. He moved to Exeter City in 1964, where he made 37 league appearances over the next two seasons. Fulton died in 1976.
