= Bobby Harrop =

English footballer (1936–2007)

Personal information
- Full name: Robert Harrop
- Date of birth: 25 August 1936
- Place of birth: Manchester, England
- Date of death: 8 November 2007 (aged 71)
- Place of death: Margate, England
- Height: 5 ft 10 in (1.78 m)
- Position: Centre-back

Youth career
- 1953–1954: Manchester United

Senior career*
Years	Team	Apps	(Gls)
1954–1959	Manchester United	10	(0)
1959–1961	Tranmere Rovers	41	(2)
1961–1969	Margate	533	(25)
1969–1972	Ashford Town (Kent)	106	(9)
1972–1977	Canterbury City	171	(5)
1977–1978	Margate	31	(1)
1978–1979	Ramsgate		
- * Club domestic league appearances and goals

Robert Harrop (25 August 1936 – 8 November 2007) was an English footballer who played as a centre back. He was born in Manchester and played in the Football League for Manchester United and Tranmere Rovers.

Harrop joined Manchester United as a youth team player in 1953 and was an FA Youth Cup winner in 1954 and later graduated to the reserve side after turning professional. His first team debut came on 5 March 1958, a month after the Munich air disaster – where eight players were killed and two never played again due to injury, while several other players were still recovering from their injuries. His debut was against West Bromwich Albion in the FA Cup fifth round replay. He made a further five appearances that season, and five more in 1958–59, but never became a regular player and was sold to Tranmere Rovers for £4,000 in 1961.

He spent two seasons at Prenton Park before quitting league football at the age of 27, when he signed for non league Margate in Kent. He played 564 games for the Hartsdown Park club in two spells until 1978. In between these he clocked over a century appearances at both Ashford Town (Kent) and Canterbury City, where he became player-manager for the final two seasons of his stay.

Then at the age of 42 he signed for neighbouring Ramsgate. 52 appearances came over the next two seasons and he carried on playing until he was nearly 50, finally hanging up his boots at the end of the 1984–85 season with Dover Athletic, where he was also in charge of the reserve team.

He remained in football as a non-league referee, a role he held until just before his death in November 2007 at the age of 71.
