= John Timmins =

British businessman (1932–2026)

Sir John Timmins KCVO OBE TD JP
- Born: John Bradford Timmins; 23 June 1932; Dudley, England
- Died: 14 August 2026 (aged 94); Altrincham, England
- Education: University of Aston, Birmingham
- Occupations: Businessman; Reservist
- Known for: Lord Lieutenant of Greater Manchester
- Spouse: Jean
- Children: 6

Sir John Bradford Timmins KCVO OBE TD JP (23 June 1932 – 14 August 2026) was a British businessman, reservist and public servant.

== Life and career ==
Timmins was born on 23 June 1932, and attended Wolverhampton Technical College and the University of Aston in Birmingham. He worked in building and civil engineering until 1980 and has been chairman of Warburton Properties Ltd since 1973.

He was appointed a deputy lieutenant in 1981 and served as High Sheriff of Greater Manchester for the 1986–87-year. He was appointed a magistrate for Trafford in 1987. Timmins then served for twenty years as Lord Lieutenant of Greater Manchester, between 1987 and 2007. In 2002 he was appointed a Knight Commander of the Royal Victorian Order. He has also received honorary doctorates from the University of Salford and the University of Manchester.

Timmins was also active in the Territorial Army between 1956 and 1980; he commanded 75 Engineer Regiment from 1971 to 1973 and was appointed an Officer of the Order of the British Empire that year.

His main business interest was Director of Warburton Propoerties Ltd, as well as a Director for The Greater Manchester Museum of Science and Industry Trust, (Science and Industry Museum), for five years from 1991

Timmins and his family lived for several years in The Old Rectory, Warburton a Grade 2 building until 2009, when they sold up and retired The building was the Rectory to timber-framed Grade I Church of St Werburgh which is claimed to date back to Saxon times.

Timmins died in Altrincham on 14 August 2026, aged 94.

Honorary titles
Preceded by Sir William Downward	Lord Lieutenant of Greater Manchester; 1988–2007	Succeeded by Sir Warren James Smith
Preceded by Col. Tom Sherman	High Sheriff of Greater Manchester; 1986–7	Succeeded by Col. Arthur Axford
