= Andy Smillie =

English footballer

Personal information
- Date of birth: 15 March 1941 (age 85)
- Place of birth: Ilford, Essex, England
- Position: Inside forward

Youth career
- 1956–1958: West Ham United

Senior career*
Years	Team	Apps	(Gls)
1958–1961	West Ham United	20	(3)
1961–1963	Crystal Palace	53	(23)
1963–1965	Scunthorpe United	13	(2)
1964–1969	Southend United	164	(29)
1968–1971	Gillingham	94	(7)
1971–?	Folkestone Town		
- Ferndale

International career
	England Youth	3	
- * Club domestic league appearances and goals

Andrew Thomas Smillie (born 15 March 1941) is an English former professional footballer who played as an inside forward.

Smillie was born in Ilford and played for Ilford, London and England Schoolboys. He joined the groundstaff at West Ham United in 1956 and gained three England Youth caps before signing professional forms with the Irons in 1958. After a senior debut against Southend United in the Southern Floodlight Cup on 10 March 1958, he made his First Division bow on 26 December 1958 against Tottenham Hotspur. In all, Smillie played 26 games for West Ham, leaving in 1961.

Smillie went on to play League football for Crystal Palace, Scunthorpe United, Southend United and Gillingham, before joining Folkestone Town in 1971. He later played for Ferndale.
