= Brady (surname) =

The Brady coat of arms

Brady is a surname derived from the Irish surname Ó Brádaigh or Mac Brádaigh, meaning "spirited; broad".

In a listing by the U.S. Census Bureau of the most common U.S. surnames, Brady was ranked at No. 411 in 2014.

The surname was used as a test of nominative determinism in a humorous 2013 article in the British Medical Journal.

== Surname ==
=== A ===
- Aidan Brady (disambiguation), multiple people
- Áine Brady (born 1954), Irish politician
- Al Brady (1910–1937), American criminal
- Alan Brady (1909–1969), Australian rugby union footballer
- Alec Brady (1870–1913), Scottish footballer
- Alfred Barton Brady (1856–1932), Australian architect
- Alice Brady (1892–1939), American actress
- Alice Brady (labour activist) (1898–1914), Irish labour activist
- Alison Brady (born 1979), American photographer
- Andrea Brady (born 1974), American poet
- Angela Brady (born 1957), Irish architect
- Anne-Marie Brady (born 1966), New Zealand political researcher
- Anthony Brady (disambiguation), multiple people
- Antonio Brady (1811–1881), English naturalist
- Arthur Brady (disambiguation), multiple people
- Austin Brady (born 1955), Irish footballer

=== B ===
- Beau Brady (born 1981), Australian actor
- Berkley Brady, Canadian filmmaker
- Bernie Brady (born 1947), Australian rules footballer
- Bill Brady (disambiguation), multiple people
- Bob Brady (disambiguation), multiple people
- Bobbi Ann Brady (born 1975/1976), Canadian politician
- Brendan Brady (footballer) (1917–2010), Australian rules footballer
- Brian Brady (1903–1949), Irish politician
- Brian Brady (baseball) (born 1962), American baseball player
- Brookner Brady (1905–1977), American pentathlete and colonel

=== C ===
- Campbell Brady (1891–1947), Australian rules footballer
- Carolyn Brady (1937–2005), American artist
- Catherine Brady, American writer
- Cathy Brady, Irish film director and screenwriter
- Charles Brady (disambiguation), multiple people
- Christopher Brady (disambiguation), multiple people
- Christian M. M. Brady (born 1969), American translator
- Ciarán Brady (born 1994), Irish Gaelic footballer
- Claire Brady (disambiguation), multiple people
- Cliff Brady (1897–1974), American baseball player
- Clifton Brady (1894–1963), American architect
- Colin Brady, American animator
- Conor Brady (born 1949), Irish journalist
- Conor Brady (Gaelic footballer) (born 1998), Irish Gaelic footballer
- Cyprian Brady (born 1962), Irish politician

=== D ===
- Dan Brady (disambiguation), multiple people
- Darren Brady (born 1981), Scottish footballer
- Dave Brady (1930–1988), American sportswriter
- David Brady (disambiguation), multiple people
- Dearbhaile Brady (born 2007), Irish para swimmer
- Denis Caulfield Brady (1804–1886), British politician
- Dennis Brady (cricketer) (born 1951), New Zealand cricketer
- Dennis Pat Brady (1928–2010), American boxer
- Don Brady (1927–1984), Australian missionary
- Donita Brady, American biologist
- Donny Brady (born 1973), American football player
- Dorothy Brady (1903–1977), American mathematician and economist
- Doug Brady (born 1969), American baseball player
- Dylan Brady (born 1993), American singer-songwriter
- Dylan Brady (country singer) (born 1998), American singer-songwriter

=== E ===
- Ed Brady (disambiguation), multiple people
- Edward Brady (disambiguation), multiple people
- Edwin James Brady (1869–1952), Australian poet
- E. J. Brady (1869–1952), Australian journalist and writer
- Elizabeth Brady (1803–1874), British headmistress
- Elward Thomas Brady Jr. (1926–2007), American politician
- Emily Brady, English philosopher
- Erin Brady (born 1987), American television host
- Erin Brady (politician), American politician
- Ernest Brady (1917–2003), English academic administrator
- Eugene R. Brady (1928–2011), American naval aviator

=== F ===
- Farmer Brady (1893–??), American baseball player
- Fern Brady (born 1986), Scottish comedian
- Francis Brady (disambiguation), multiple people
- Frank Brady (disambiguation), multiple people

=== G ===
- Gabrielle Brady (born 1984), Australian filmmaker
- Garry Brady (born 1976), Scottish footballer
- Gavin Brady (born 1973), New Zealand sailor
- Genevieve Garvan Brady (1880–1938), American philanthropist
- George Brady (disambiguation), multiple people
- Ger Brady (1980–2024), Irish Gaelic footballer
- Gerald Brady (born 1956), American politician
- Gerard Brady (1936–2020), Irish politician
- Gerry Brady (born 1948), Irish politician
- Gerry Brady (sport shooter) (1925–2012), Irish sport shooter
- Glenn Brady (1935–2019), American football and baseball coach
- Gordon L. Brady, American economist
- Graham Brady (born 1967), British politician
- Greg Brady (disambiguation), multiple people
- Gregory Brady (born 1969), American military officer

=== H ===
- Hana Brady (1931–1944), Czechoslovak Holocaust victim
- Henry Brady (disambiguation), multiple people
- Herman Brady (1919–2011), Chilean military officer
- Holly A. Brady (born 1969), American judge
- Hugh Brady (disambiguation), multiple people

=== I ===
- Ian Brady (1938–2017), Scottish serial killer
- Ice Brady (born 2004), American basketball player

=== J ===
- Jack Brady (born 1996), Irish footballer
- Jackie Brady (born 1975), British artistic gymnast
- Jackson Brady (born 1997), New Zealand footballer
- James Brady (disambiguation), multiple people
- Jasper Ewing Brady (1797–1871), American politician
- Jayne Brady (born 1972), Northern Irish civil servant
- Jeff Brady (born 1968), American football player
- Jennifer Brady (born 1995), American tennis player
- Jerry Brady (born 1936), American businessman
- Jim Brady (disambiguation), multiple people
- Joan Brady (disambiguation), multiple people
- John Brady (disambiguation), multiple people
- Jonathan Brady (born 2003), American football player
- Joseph Brady (disambiguation), multiple people
- Julio Brady (1942–2015), American judge
- Justin Brady, British actor

=== K ===
- Kathleen Brady (disambiguation), multiple people
- Karren Brady (born 1969), British sporting executive and broadcaster
- Kelly Brady (disambiguation), multiple people
- Kerry Brady (born 1963), American football player
- Kevin Brady (disambiguation), multiple people
- Kieron Brady (born 1971), Scottish footballer
- Killian Brady (born 1990), Irish Gaelic footballer
- King Brady (1881–1947), American baseball player
- Kyle Brady (born 1972), American football player

=== L ===
- Laurence Brady (1892–1973), Irish politician
- Laurie Brady (1895–1944), Australian rules footballer
- Leo Brady (1917–1984), American writer
- Liam Brady (born 1956), Irish footballer

=== M ===
- Marcus Brady (born 1979), American football coach
- Margaret Brady (disambiguation), multiple people
- Marlene Brady, American politician
- Mathew Brady (1823–1896), Irish-American photographer
- Matt Brady (born 1965), American basketball coach
- Matthew Brady (disambiguation), multiple people
- Maureen Brady (born 1943), American writer
- Maurice V. Brady (1904–1991), American politician
- Mary Brady (1821–1864), American nurse
- Maya Brady (born 2001), American softball player
- Maziere Brady (1796–1871), Irish judge
- Michael Brady (disambiguation), multiple people
- Mickey Brady (1950–2026), Irish politician
- Mildred Edie Brady (1906–1965), American writer
- Millie Brady (born 1993), British actress
- M. Jane Brady (born 1951), American attorney and judge
- Moya Brady (born 1962), English actress
- Mungo Brady, Scottish goldsmith

=== N ===
- Neal Brady (1897–1947), American baseball player
- Neil Brady (born 1968), Canadian ice hockey player
- Nicholas Brady (disambiguation), multiple people
- Nigel Brady (born 1979), Irish rugby union footballer
- Nyle C. Brady (1920–2015), American soil scientist

=== O ===
- Ollie Brady, Irish Gaelic footballer
- Orla Brady (born 1961), Irish film and television actress

=== P ===
- Pam Brady (born 1969), American television producer
- Pam Bristol Brady (born 1953), American badminton player
- Paraic Brady (born 1972/1973), Irish politician
- Pat Brady (disambiguation), multiple people
- Patrick Brady (disambiguation), multiple people
- Paul Brady (disambiguation), multiple people
- Peta Brady (born 1972), Australian actress
- Peter Brady (disambiguation), multiple people
- Phil Brady (Gaelic footballer) (??–1980), Irish Gaelic footballer
- Philip Brady (disambiguation), multiple people

=== R ===
- Rab Brady (born 1961), Irish rugby union footballer
- Ray Brady (1937–2016), Irish footballer
- Rhonda Brady (born 1959), American track and field athlete
- Richard Brady (??–1607), Irish prelate
- Rickey Brady (born 1970), American football player
- Robbie Brady (born 1992), Irish footballer
- Robert Brady (disambiguation), multiple people
- Rodney H. Brady (1933–2017), American businessman
- Roger A. Brady (born 1946), American general
- Rory Brady (1957–2010), Irish barrister
- Roscoe Brady (1923–2016), American biochemist
- Royston Brady (born 1972), Irish businessman and politician
- Ryan Brady (born 1980), American football coach

=== S ===
- Samuel Brady (1756–1795), American military officer
- Samuel Brady (Maryland politician) (??–1871), American politician
- Sarah Brady (1942–2015), American activist
- Scott Brady (disambiguation), multiple people
- Seán Brady (disambiguation), multiple people
- Shannon Brady (born 1996), Australian footballer
- Shaun Brady, British trade unionist
- Siobhan Brady, Canadian biologist
- Sister Mary Brady (1922–2014), Australian artist and religious figure
- Spike Brady (1854–??), American baseball player
- St. Elmo Brady (1884–1966), American chemist
- Stephen Brady (disambiguation), multiple people
- Stumpy Brady (1910–??), American musician
- Susan Brady, American psychologist and literacy expert

=== T ===
- Tanya Brady (1973–2022), British army captain
- Terence Brady (disambiguation), multiple people
- Terry Brady, Irish businessman and sports owner
- Terry Brady (footballer) (born 1944), Australian rules footballer
- Tess Brady (born 1948), American writer
- Thérèse Brady (1930–1999), Irish psychologist
- Thomas Brady (disambiguation), multiple people
- Tiernan Brady, Irish-Australian politician
- Tom Brady (born 1977), American football player

=== V ===
- Vanessa Brady (born 1959), English interior designer
- Veronica Brady (1929–2015), Australian religious figure
- Vincent Brady (1936–2020), Irish politician

=== W ===
- Wayne Brady (born 1972), American comedian and television personality
- William Brady (disambiguation), multiple people
- W. Tate Brady (1870–1925), American businessman

== Fictional characters ==
- Bo Brady, a character in Days of Our Lives
- Bobby Brady, a character in The Brady Bunch
- Brendan Brady, a character in Hollyoaks
- Carol Brady, a character in The Brady Bunch
- Caroline Brady, a character in Days of Our Lives
- Carrie Brady, a character in Days of Our Lives
- Cassie Brady, a character in Days of Our Lives
- Chelsea Brady, a character in Days of Our Lives
- Cheryl Brady, a character in Days of Our Lives
- Ciara Brady, a character in Days of Our Lives
- Cindy Brady, a character in The Brady Bunch
- Eric Brady, a character in Days of Our Lives
- Frankie Brady, a character in Days of Our Lives
- Greg Brady, a character in The Brady Bunch
- Hope Williams Brady, a character in Days of Our Lives
- Jan Brady, a character in The Brady Bunch
- Kayla Brady, a character in Days of Our Lives
- Kimberly Brady, a character in Days of Our Lives
- Marcia Brady, a character in The Brady Bunch
- Mike Brady, a character in The Brady Bunch
- Peter Brady, a character in The Brady Bunch
- Roman Brady, a character in Days of Our Lives
- Sami Brady, a character in Days of Our Lives
- Shawn Brady, a character in Days of Our Lives
- Shawn-Douglas Brady, a character in Days of Our Lives

== See also ==
- Attorney General Brady (disambiguation)
- General Brady (disambiguation)
- Judge Brady (disambiguation)
- Justice Brady (disambiguation)
- Senator Brady (disambiguation)
