= John Brady =

John Brady may refer to:

== Politicians ==
- John Brady (Australian politician) (1904–1993), former member of the Western Australian Legislative Assembly from 1948 to 1974
- John Brady (Indiana politician) (1803–1884), former mayor of Muncie, Indiana
- John Brady (Minnesota politician), mayor of Mankato, Minnesota
- John Brady (MP) (1812–1887), Irish physician and MP for Leitrim
- John Brady (Sinn Féin politician) (born 1973), Irish Sinn Féin politician from Wicklow
- John F. Brady (politician) (1959–2025), Delaware attorney and politician
- John Green Brady (1847–1918), Governor of Alaska Territory 1897–1906
- John Banks Brady (1875–1952), British-born Southern Rhodesian soldier, educator and politician
- John Leeford Brady (1866–1933), American lawyer, politician, and newspaper editor
- John C. Brady, 1887 mayor of Erie, Pennsylvania
- Johnny Brady (born 1948), Irish Fianna Fáil politician from Meath

== Sportspeople ==
- John Brady (basketball) (born 1954), Arkansas State, LSU and Samford men's basketball coach
- John Brady (footballer) (1932–2022), Australian rules footballer with North Melbourne
- Jon Brady (born 1975), Australian soccer player and manager

== Others ==
- John Brady (author) (died 1814), English clerk and author
- John Brady (bishop of Boston) (1842–1910), auxiliary bishop
- John Brady (bishop of Perth) (1800–1871), Roman Catholic bishop in Australia
- John Brady (showman), Australian showman who has appeared in films and in the show ring, as an expert with rope tricks and whip cracking
- John F. Brady (chemical engineer) (born 1954), American professor of chemical engineering
- John J. Brady (1899–1951), American baseball player, coach, and sportswriter
- John Joseph Brady (born 1942), American writer
- John R. Brady (1822–1891), American judge
- John Thomas Brady (1830–1890), businessman in Houston
- John W. Brady (1869–1943), American judge
- John Brady, musician who performed in Swing Kids, Spanakorzo and Sweep the Leg Johnny

== See also ==
- Seán Brady (disambiguation) for people using the Irish version of the name John
