= Battle of Aspern-Essling order of battle =

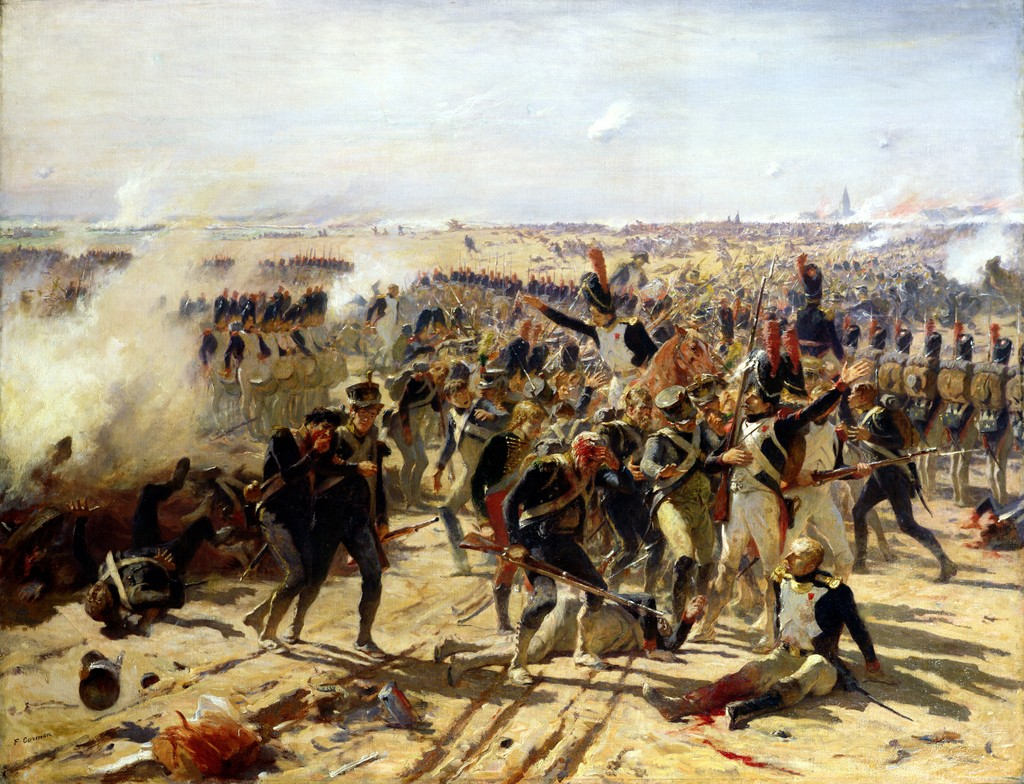
The Battle of Aspern-Essling, May 1809 by Fernand Cormon

The Battle of Aspern-Essling order of battle is shown below. The battle was fought on 21–22 May 1809 during the War of the Fifth Coalition. An Imperial French army led by Napoleon was defeated by a larger Austrian Empire army commanded by Archduke Charles, Duke of Teschen.

== Abbreviations ==
- GdK = General der Kavallerie
- FZM = Feldzeugmeister
- FML = Feldmarschall-Leutnant
- GM = Generalmajor
- OB = Oberst
- OBL = Oberstleutnant
- Maj = Major
- Gren = Grenadier infantry
- Inf = Infantry
- Cav = Cavalry
- det = Detachment
- M = Marshal of the Empire
- GD = General of Division
- GB = General of Brigade
- Col = Colonel
- pdr = pounder
- how = Howitzer
- IR = Infantry Regiment
- Bn = Battalion
- Gd = Imperial Guard
- HD = Hesse-Darmstadt

== Austrian Army ==
Army leadership and staff for 20 March 1809 are listed below. The Austrian army at Aspern-Essling numbered 90,226 infantry, 12,918 cavalry, and 4,000–6,000 artillerymen. Note that the three cavalry units in gray were temporarily detached from their Armeekorps and assigned to the I Reserve Armeekorps.

- Generalissimus: Archduke Charles, Duke of Teschen
- Adjutant generals: FML Philipp Ferdinand von Grünne, GM Josef von Colloredo, OB Maximilian von Wimpffen, OBL Maximilian Auersperg
- Kommando: FML Josef von Stipsicz
- Artillery: FML Archduke Maximilian of Austria-Este
- Pioneers: GM Josef Schwäger von Hohenbruck
- Engineers: GM Philipp de Lopez

Austrian Army - Battle of Aspern-Essling
Armeekorps	Division	Brigade	Unit	Strength
Advance Guard; 5,907; 4,129 inf 1,778 cav 6 guns	Division; FML Johann von Klenau	Brigade; GM Ignaz Count Hardegg	1st Jäger Bn	770
Advance Guard; 5,907; 4,129 inf 1,778 cav 6 guns	Division; FML Johann von Klenau	Brigade; GM Ignaz Count Hardegg	Archduke Charles IR; Nr. 3	3,359
Advance Guard; 5,907; 4,129 inf 1,778 cav 6 guns	Division; FML Johann von Klenau	Brigade; GM Ignaz Count Hardegg	Stipsicz Hussar; Regiment Nr. 10	861
Advance Guard; 5,907; 4,129 inf 1,778 cav 6 guns	Division; FML Johann von Klenau	Brigade; GM Ignaz Count Hardegg	Schwarzenberg Uhlan; Regiment Nr. 2	917
Advance Guard; 5,907; 4,129 inf 1,778 cav 6 guns	Division; FML Johann von Klenau	Brigade; GM Ignaz Count Hardegg	6-pdr Cavalry Battery	6 guns
I Armeekorps; GdK Heinrich von Bellegarde; 24,594 (-1,039); 23,555 inf 0 cav 50 guns	Division; FML Joseph von Dedovich	Brigade; GM Josef von Henneberg	Reuss-Plauen IR Nr. 17	3,313
I Armeekorps; GdK Heinrich von Bellegarde; 24,594 (-1,039); 23,555 inf 0 cav 50 guns	Division; FML Joseph von Dedovich	Brigade; GM Josef von Henneberg	Kollowrat IR Nr. 36	3,185
I Armeekorps; GdK Heinrich von Bellegarde; 24,594 (-1,039); 23,555 inf 0 cav 50 guns	Division; FML Joseph von Dedovich	Brigade; GM Josef von Henneberg	6-pdr Brigade Battery	8 guns
I Armeekorps; GdK Heinrich von Bellegarde; 24,594 (-1,039); 23,555 inf 0 cav 50 guns	Division; FML Joseph von Dedovich	Brigade; GM Theodore Wacquant	Archduke Rainer IR; Nr. 11	3,303
I Armeekorps; GdK Heinrich von Bellegarde; 24,594 (-1,039); 23,555 inf 0 cav 50 guns	Division; FML Joseph von Dedovich	Brigade; GM Theodore Wacquant	Vogelsang IR Nr. 47	3,238
I Armeekorps; GdK Heinrich von Bellegarde; 24,594 (-1,039); 23,555 inf 0 cav 50 guns	Division; FML Joseph von Dedovich	Brigade; GM Theodore Wacquant	6-pdr Brigade Battery	8 guns
I Armeekorps; GdK Heinrich von Bellegarde; 24,594 (-1,039); 23,555 inf 0 cav 50 guns	Division; FML Jean Hennequin de Fresnel	Brigade; GM Joseph Clary und Aldringen	Anton Mittrowsky IR; Nr. 10	2,185
I Armeekorps; GdK Heinrich von Bellegarde; 24,594 (-1,039); 23,555 inf 0 cav 50 guns	Division; FML Jean Hennequin de Fresnel	Brigade; GM Joseph Clary und Aldringen	Erbach IR Nr. 42	2,315
I Armeekorps; GdK Heinrich von Bellegarde; 24,594 (-1,039); 23,555 inf 0 cav 50 guns	Division; FML Jean Hennequin de Fresnel	Brigade; GM Joseph Clary und Aldringen	6-pdr Brigade Battery	8 guns
I Armeekorps; GdK Heinrich von Bellegarde; 24,594 (-1,039); 23,555 inf 0 cav 50 guns	Division; FML Jean Hennequin de Fresnel	Brigade; GM Peter von Lutz	Argenteau IR Nr. 35	3,397
I Armeekorps; GdK Heinrich von Bellegarde; 24,594 (-1,039); 23,555 inf 0 cav 50 guns	Division; FML Jean Hennequin de Fresnel	Brigade; GM Peter von Lutz	Archduke Charles; Legion, 4th Bn	960
I Armeekorps; GdK Heinrich von Bellegarde; 24,594 (-1,039); 23,555 inf 0 cav 50 guns	Division; FML Jean Hennequin de Fresnel	Brigade; GM Peter von Lutz	6-pdr Brigade Battery	8 guns
I Armeekorps; GdK Heinrich von Bellegarde; 24,594 (-1,039); 23,555 inf 0 cav 50 guns	Division; FML Jean Hennequin de Fresnel	Brigade; GM Karl von Stutterheim	2nd Jäger Bn	891
I Armeekorps; GdK Heinrich von Bellegarde; 24,594 (-1,039); 23,555 inf 0 cav 50 guns	Division; FML Jean Hennequin de Fresnel	Brigade; GM Karl von Stutterheim	3rd Jäger Bn	768
I Armeekorps; GdK Heinrich von Bellegarde; 24,594 (-1,039); 23,555 inf 0 cav 50 guns	Division; FML Jean Hennequin de Fresnel	Brigade; GM Karl von Stutterheim	Blankenstein Hussar Regiment Nr. 6	1,039
I Armeekorps; GdK Heinrich von Bellegarde; 24,594 (-1,039); 23,555 inf 0 cav 50 guns	Division; FML Jean Hennequin de Fresnel	Brigade; GM Karl von Stutterheim	6-pdr Cavalry Battery	6 guns
I Armeekorps; GdK Heinrich von Bellegarde; 24,594 (-1,039); 23,555 inf 0 cav 50 guns	Reserve Artillery; OB Anton von Stwrtnik	not brigaded	12-pdr Position Battery	6 guns
I Armeekorps; GdK Heinrich von Bellegarde; 24,594 (-1,039); 23,555 inf 0 cav 50 guns	Reserve Artillery; OB Anton von Stwrtnik	not brigaded	6-pdr Position Battery	6 guns
II Armeekorps; GdK Friedrich of Hohenzollern-Hechingen; 21,590 (-780); 20,810 inf 0 cav 50 guns	Division; FML Thomas Brady of Longthee	Brigade; GM Karl von Paar	Froon IR Nr. 54	1,500
II Armeekorps; GdK Friedrich of Hohenzollern-Hechingen; 21,590 (-780); 20,810 inf 0 cav 50 guns	Division; FML Thomas Brady of Longthee	Brigade; GM Karl von Paar	Zedtwitz IR Nr. 25	1,967
II Armeekorps; GdK Friedrich of Hohenzollern-Hechingen; 21,590 (-780); 20,810 inf 0 cav 50 guns	Division; FML Thomas Brady of Longthee	Brigade; GM Karl von Paar	6-pdr Brigade Battery	8 guns
II Armeekorps; GdK Friedrich of Hohenzollern-Hechingen; 21,590 (-780); 20,810 inf 0 cav 50 guns	Division; FML Thomas Brady of Longthee	Brigade; GM Wenzel Buress von Greiffenbach (Note: Bowden & Tarbox listed this name as Buresch. (p. 89) Smith & Kudrna listed it as Buress.)	Joseph Colloredo IR; Nr. 57	2,064
II Armeekorps; GdK Friedrich of Hohenzollern-Hechingen; 21,590 (-780); 20,810 inf 0 cav 50 guns	Division; FML Thomas Brady of Longthee	Brigade; GM Wenzel Buress von Greiffenbach	Zach IR Nr. 15	1,548
II Armeekorps; GdK Friedrich of Hohenzollern-Hechingen; 21,590 (-780); 20,810 inf 0 cav 50 guns	Division; FML Thomas Brady of Longthee	Brigade; GM Wenzel Buress von Greiffenbach	6-pdr Brigade Battery	8 guns
II Armeekorps; GdK Friedrich of Hohenzollern-Hechingen; 21,590 (-780); 20,810 inf 0 cav 50 guns	Division; FML Josef Kajetan von Ulm	Brigade; GM Johann Allmeyer von Allstern (Note: Bowden & Tarbox listed this name as Alstern. (p. 89) Smith & Kudrna listed it as Allmeyer von Allstern.)	Rohan IR Nr. 21	2,874
II Armeekorps; GdK Friedrich of Hohenzollern-Hechingen; 21,590 (-780); 20,810 inf 0 cav 50 guns	Division; FML Josef Kajetan von Ulm	Brigade; GM Johann Allmeyer von Allstern	Stuart IR Nr. 18	2,937
II Armeekorps; GdK Friedrich of Hohenzollern-Hechingen; 21,590 (-780); 20,810 inf 0 cav 50 guns	Division; FML Josef Kajetan von Ulm	Brigade; GM Johann Allmeyer von Allstern	Frölich IR Nr. 28	3,305
II Armeekorps; GdK Friedrich of Hohenzollern-Hechingen; 21,590 (-780); 20,810 inf 0 cav 50 guns	Division; FML Josef Kajetan von Ulm	Brigade; GM Johann Allmeyer von Allstern	6-pdr Brigade Battery	8 guns
II Armeekorps; GdK Friedrich of Hohenzollern-Hechingen; 21,590 (-780); 20,810 inf 0 cav 50 guns	Division; FML Josef Kajetan von Ulm	Brigade; GM Friedrich von Wied-Runkel	Stain IR Nr. 50	1,062
II Armeekorps; GdK Friedrich of Hohenzollern-Hechingen; 21,590 (-780); 20,810 inf 0 cav 50 guns	Division; FML Josef Kajetan von Ulm	Brigade; GM Friedrich von Wied-Runkel	Würzburg IR Nr. 23, 3rd Bn	669
II Armeekorps; GdK Friedrich of Hohenzollern-Hechingen; 21,590 (-780); 20,810 inf 0 cav 50 guns	Division; FML Josef Kajetan von Ulm	Brigade; GM Friedrich von Wied-Runkel	Württemberg IR Nr. 38, 3rd Bn	800
II Armeekorps; GdK Friedrich of Hohenzollern-Hechingen; 21,590 (-780); 20,810 inf 0 cav 50 guns	Division; FML Josef Kajetan von Ulm	Brigade; GM Friedrich von Wied-Runkel	6-pdr Brigade Battery	8 guns
II Armeekorps; GdK Friedrich of Hohenzollern-Hechingen; 21,590 (-780); 20,810 inf 0 cav 50 guns	Division; FML Josef Kajetan von Ulm	Brigade; GM Heinrich Bersina von Siegenthal	7th Jäger Bn	493
II Armeekorps; GdK Friedrich of Hohenzollern-Hechingen; 21,590 (-780); 20,810 inf 0 cav 50 guns	Division; FML Josef Kajetan von Ulm	Brigade; GM Heinrich Bersina von Siegenthal	8th Jäger Bn	620
II Armeekorps; GdK Friedrich of Hohenzollern-Hechingen; 21,590 (-780); 20,810 inf 0 cav 50 guns	Division; FML Josef Kajetan von Ulm	Brigade; GM Heinrich Bersina von Siegenthal	Archduke Charles; Legion, 2nd Bn	958
II Armeekorps; GdK Friedrich of Hohenzollern-Hechingen; 21,590 (-780); 20,810 inf 0 cav 50 guns	Division; FML Josef Kajetan von Ulm	Brigade; GM Heinrich Bersina von Siegenthal	Klenau Chevau-léger Regiment Nr. 5	780
II Armeekorps; GdK Friedrich of Hohenzollern-Hechingen; 21,590 (-780); 20,810 inf 0 cav 50 guns	Division; FML Josef Kajetan von Ulm	Brigade; GM Heinrich Bersina von Siegenthal	6-pdr Cavalry Battery	6 guns
II Armeekorps; GdK Friedrich of Hohenzollern-Hechingen; 21,590 (-780); 20,810 inf 0 cav 50 guns	Reserve Artillery; Maj Anton von Kfeller	not brigaded	12-pdr Position Battery	6 guns
II Armeekorps; GdK Friedrich of Hohenzollern-Hechingen; 21,590 (-780); 20,810 inf 0 cav 50 guns	Reserve Artillery; Maj Anton von Kfeller	not brigaded	6-pdr Position Battery	6 guns
IV Armeekorps; FML Franz Seraph of Orsini-Rosenberg; 21,702 (-746); 20,220 inf 821 cav 50 guns	Division; FML Ludwig Hohenlohe Bartenstein	Brigade; GM Philipp von Hessen-Homburg	Hiller IR Nr. 2	3,450
IV Armeekorps; FML Franz Seraph of Orsini-Rosenberg; 21,702 (-746); 20,220 inf 821 cav 50 guns	Division; FML Ludwig Hohenlohe Bartenstein	Brigade; GM Philipp von Hessen-Homburg	Sztarrai IR Nr. 33	2,871
IV Armeekorps; FML Franz Seraph of Orsini-Rosenberg; 21,702 (-746); 20,220 inf 821 cav 50 guns	Division; FML Ludwig Hohenlohe Bartenstein	Brigade; GM Philipp von Hessen-Homburg	6-pdr Brigade Battery	8 guns
IV Armeekorps; FML Franz Seraph of Orsini-Rosenberg; 21,702 (-746); 20,220 inf 821 cav 50 guns	Division; FML Ludwig Hohenlohe Bartenstein	Brigade; GM Johann von Neustädter	Reuss-Greiz IR Nr. 55	692
IV Armeekorps; FML Franz Seraph of Orsini-Rosenberg; 21,702 (-746); 20,220 inf 821 cav 50 guns	Division; FML Ludwig Hohenlohe Bartenstein	Brigade; GM Johann von Neustädter	Czartorisky IR Nr. 9	2,248
IV Armeekorps; FML Franz Seraph of Orsini-Rosenberg; 21,702 (-746); 20,220 inf 821 cav 50 guns	Division; FML Ludwig Hohenlohe Bartenstein	Brigade; GM Johann von Neustädter	6-pdr Brigade Battery	8 guns
IV Armeekorps; FML Franz Seraph of Orsini-Rosenberg; 21,702 (-746); 20,220 inf 821 cav 50 guns	Division; Louis Victor de Rohan	Brigade; GM Robert Swinburne	Archduke Ludwig IR Nr. 8	2,498
IV Armeekorps; FML Franz Seraph of Orsini-Rosenberg; 21,702 (-746); 20,220 inf 821 cav 50 guns	Division; Louis Victor de Rohan	Brigade; GM Robert Swinburne	Coburg IR Nr. 22	2,368
IV Armeekorps; FML Franz Seraph of Orsini-Rosenberg; 21,702 (-746); 20,220 inf 821 cav 50 guns	Division; Louis Victor de Rohan	Brigade; GM Robert Swinburne	6-pdr Brigade Battery	8 guns
IV Armeekorps; FML Franz Seraph of Orsini-Rosenberg; 21,702 (-746); 20,220 inf 821 cav 50 guns	Division; Louis Victor de Rohan	Brigade; GM Friedrich von Riese	Bellegarde IR Nr. 44	2,022
IV Armeekorps; FML Franz Seraph of Orsini-Rosenberg; 21,702 (-746); 20,220 inf 821 cav 50 guns	Division; Louis Victor de Rohan	Brigade; GM Friedrich von Riese	Chasteler IR Nr. 64	1,628
IV Armeekorps; FML Franz Seraph of Orsini-Rosenberg; 21,702 (-746); 20,220 inf 821 cav 50 guns	Division; Louis Victor de Rohan	Brigade; GM Friedrich von Riese	6-pdr Brigade Battery	8 guns
IV Armeekorps; FML Franz Seraph of Orsini-Rosenberg; 21,702 (-746); 20,220 inf 821 cav 50 guns	Division; Louis Victor de Rohan	Brigade unknown commander	Wallach-Illyrian Grenz; IR Nr. 13	1,302
IV Armeekorps; FML Franz Seraph of Orsini-Rosenberg; 21,702 (-746); 20,220 inf 821 cav 50 guns	Division; Louis Victor de Rohan	Brigade unknown commander	2nd Mahr Volunteer Bn	993
IV Armeekorps; FML Franz Seraph of Orsini-Rosenberg; 21,702 (-746); 20,220 inf 821 cav 50 guns	Division; Louis Victor de Rohan	Brigade unknown commander	Carneville Freikorps Inf	208
IV Armeekorps; FML Franz Seraph of Orsini-Rosenberg; 21,702 (-746); 20,220 inf 821 cav 50 guns	Division; Louis Victor de Rohan	Brigade unknown commander	Carneville Freikorps Cav	115
IV Armeekorps; FML Franz Seraph of Orsini-Rosenberg; 21,702 (-746); 20,220 inf 821 cav 50 guns	Division; Louis Victor de Rohan	Brigade unknown commander	Vincent Chevau-léger Regiment Nr. 4	746
IV Armeekorps; FML Franz Seraph of Orsini-Rosenberg; 21,702 (-746); 20,220 inf 821 cav 50 guns	Division; Louis Victor de Rohan	Brigade unknown commander	Archduke Ferdinand Hussar; Regiment Nr. 3	821
IV Armeekorps; FML Franz Seraph of Orsini-Rosenberg; 21,702 (-746); 20,220 inf 821 cav 50 guns	Division; Louis Victor de Rohan	Brigade unknown commander	6-pdr Cavalry Battery	6 guns
IV Armeekorps; FML Franz Seraph of Orsini-Rosenberg; 21,702 (-746); 20,220 inf 821 cav 50 guns	Reserve Artillery; OBL Hermann von Künigl	not brigaded	12-pdr Position Battery	6 guns
IV Armeekorps; FML Franz Seraph of Orsini-Rosenberg; 21,702 (-746); 20,220 inf 821 cav 50 guns	Reserve Artillery; OBL Hermann von Künigl	not brigaded	6-pdr Position Battery	6 guns
VI Armeekorps; FML Johann von Hiller; 12,858 (Note: The VI Armeekorps strength included artillerymen and train drivers. The other Armeekorps counted infantry and cavalry only. (Bowden & Tarbox, p. 93)); 10,360 inf 1,165 cav 54 guns	Division; FML Otto Adolf von Hohenfeld	Brigade; GM Christoph von Adler (Note: Bowden & Tarbox listed this name as Alder. (p. 90) Smith & Kudrna listed it as Adler.)	Klebek IR Nr. 14	973
VI Armeekorps; FML Johann von Hiller; 12,858; 10,360 inf 1,165 cav 54 guns	Division; FML Otto Adolf von Hohenfeld	Brigade; GM Christoph von Adler	Jordis IR Nr. 59	824
VI Armeekorps; FML Johann von Hiller; 12,858; 10,360 inf 1,165 cav 54 guns	Division; FML Otto Adolf von Hohenfeld	Brigade; GM Christoph von Adler	3rd Mahr Landwehr Bn	1,057
VI Armeekorps; FML Johann von Hiller; 12,858; 10,360 inf 1,165 cav 54 guns	Division; FML Otto Adolf von Hohenfeld	Brigade; GM Christoph von Adler	6-pdr Brigade Battery	8 guns
VI Armeekorps; FML Johann von Hiller; 12,858; 10,360 inf 1,165 cav 54 guns	Division; FML Otto Adolf von Hohenfeld	Brigade; GM Frederick Bianchi	Ignaz Gyulai IR Nr. 60	1,717
VI Armeekorps; FML Johann von Hiller; 12,858; 10,360 inf 1,165 cav 54 guns	Division; FML Otto Adolf von Hohenfeld	Brigade; GM Frederick Bianchi	Duka IR Nr. 39	1,065
VI Armeekorps; FML Johann von Hiller; 12,858; 10,360 inf 1,165 cav 54 guns	Division; FML Otto Adolf von Hohenfeld	Brigade; GM Frederick Bianchi	6-pdr Brigade Battery	8 guns
VI Armeekorps; FML Johann von Hiller; 12,858; 10,360 inf 1,165 cav 54 guns	Division; FML Friedrich Kottulinsky	Brigade; GM Josef Hoffmeister	Splenyi IR Nr. 51	938
VI Armeekorps; FML Johann von Hiller; 12,858; 10,360 inf 1,165 cav 54 guns	Division; FML Friedrich Kottulinsky	Brigade; GM Josef Hoffmeister	Benjowski IR Nr. 31	1,130
VI Armeekorps; FML Johann von Hiller; 12,858; 10,360 inf 1,165 cav 54 guns	Division; FML Friedrich Kottulinsky	Brigade; GM Josef Hoffmeister	3rd Vienna Volunteer Bn	547
VI Armeekorps; FML Johann von Hiller; 12,858; 10,360 inf 1,165 cav 54 guns	Division; FML Friedrich Kottulinsky	Brigade; GM Josef Hoffmeister	4th Vienna Volunteer Bn	269
VI Armeekorps; FML Johann von Hiller; 12,858; 10,360 inf 1,165 cav 54 guns	Division; FML Friedrich Kottulinsky	Brigade; GM Josef Hoffmeister	6-pdr Brigade Battery	8 guns
VI Armeekorps; FML Johann von Hiller; 12,858; 10,360 inf 1,165 cav 54 guns	Division; FML Friedrich Kottulinsky	Brigade; GM Armand von Nordmann	Warasdiner St. George Grenz IR Nr. 6	544
VI Armeekorps; FML Johann von Hiller; 12,858; 10,360 inf 1,165 cav 54 guns	Division; FML Friedrich Kottulinsky	Brigade; GM Armand von Nordmann	Broder Grenz IR Nr. 7, det.	142
VI Armeekorps; FML Johann von Hiller; 12,858; 10,360 inf 1,165 cav 54 guns	Division; FML Friedrich Kottulinsky	Brigade; GM Armand von Nordmann	1st Vienna Volunteer Bn	544
VI Armeekorps; FML Johann von Hiller; 12,858; 10,360 inf 1,165 cav 54 guns	Division; FML Friedrich Kottulinsky	Brigade; GM Armand von Nordmann	2nd Vienna Volunteer Bn	610
VI Armeekorps; FML Johann von Hiller; 12,858; 10,360 inf 1,165 cav 54 guns	Division; FML Friedrich Kottulinsky	Brigade; GM Armand von Nordmann	3-pdr Brigade Battery	6 guns
VI Armeekorps; FML Johann von Hiller; 12,858; 10,360 inf 1,165 cav 54 guns	Division; FML Friedrich Kottulinsky	Brigade; GM Ludwig Wallmoden	Kienmayer Hussar Regiment Nr. 8	434
VI Armeekorps; FML Johann von Hiller; 12,858; 10,360 inf 1,165 cav 54 guns	Division; FML Friedrich Kottulinsky	Brigade; GM Ludwig Wallmoden	Liechtenstein Hussar Regiment Nr. 7	731
VI Armeekorps; FML Johann von Hiller; 12,858; 10,360 inf 1,165 cav 54 guns	Division; FML Friedrich Kottulinsky	Brigade; GM Ludwig Wallmoden	6-pdr Cavalry Battery	6 guns
VI Armeekorps; FML Johann von Hiller; 12,858; 10,360 inf 1,165 cav 54 guns	Division; FML Friedrich Kottulinsky	Artillery	6-pdr Position Battery	6 guns
VI Armeekorps; FML Johann von Hiller; 12,858; 10,360 inf 1,165 cav 54 guns	Reserve Artillery; FML Karl von Rouvroy	not brigaded	12-pdr Position Battery	6 guns
VI Armeekorps; FML Johann von Hiller; 12,858; 10,360 inf 1,165 cav 54 guns	Reserve Artillery; FML Karl von Rouvroy	not brigaded	6-pdr Position Battery	6 guns
I Reserve Armeekorps; GdK Johann of Liechtenstein; 20,191; 11,152 inf 9,039 cav 54 guns	Division; FML Konstantin d'Aspré	Brigade; GM Franz Mauroy de Merville	Scharlach Gren Bn	706
I Reserve Armeekorps; GdK Johann of Liechtenstein; 20,191; 11,152 inf 9,039 cav 54 guns	Division; FML Konstantin d'Aspré	Brigade; GM Franz Mauroy de Merville	Scovaud Gren Bn	665
I Reserve Armeekorps; GdK Johann of Liechtenstein; 20,191; 11,152 inf 9,039 cav 54 guns	Division; FML Konstantin d'Aspré	Brigade; GM Franz Mauroy de Merville	Puteani Gren Bn	682
I Reserve Armeekorps; GdK Johann of Liechtenstein; 20,191; 11,152 inf 9,039 cav 54 guns	Division; FML Konstantin d'Aspré	Brigade; GM Franz Mauroy de Merville	Brezeczinsky Gren Bn	610
I Reserve Armeekorps; GdK Johann of Liechtenstein; 20,191; 11,152 inf 9,039 cav 54 guns	Division; FML Konstantin d'Aspré	Brigade; GM Anton von Hammer	Kirchenbetter Gren Bn	613
I Reserve Armeekorps; GdK Johann of Liechtenstein; 20,191; 11,152 inf 9,039 cav 54 guns	Division; FML Konstantin d'Aspré	Brigade; GM Anton von Hammer	Bissingen Gren Bn	700
I Reserve Armeekorps; GdK Johann of Liechtenstein; 20,191; 11,152 inf 9,039 cav 54 guns	Division; FML Konstantin d'Aspré	Brigade; GM Anton von Hammer	Oklopsin Gren Bn	659
I Reserve Armeekorps; GdK Johann of Liechtenstein; 20,191; 11,152 inf 9,039 cav 54 guns	Division; FML Konstantin d'Aspré	Brigade; GM Anton von Hammer	Mayblümel Gren Bn	727
I Reserve Armeekorps; GdK Johann of Liechtenstein; 20,191; 11,152 inf 9,039 cav 54 guns	Division; FML Konstantin d'Aspré	Artillery	6-pdr Brigade Battery	6 guns
I Reserve Armeekorps; GdK Johann of Liechtenstein; 20,191; 11,152 inf 9,039 cav 54 guns	Division; FML Johann von Prochaska	Brigade; GM Albrecht Murray de Melgum	Wieniawsky Gren Bn	837
I Reserve Armeekorps; GdK Johann of Liechtenstein; 20,191; 11,152 inf 9,039 cav 54 guns	Division; FML Johann von Prochaska	Brigade; GM Albrecht Murray de Melgum	Georgy Gren Bn	745
I Reserve Armeekorps; GdK Johann of Liechtenstein; 20,191; 11,152 inf 9,039 cav 54 guns	Division; FML Johann von Prochaska	Brigade; GM Albrecht Murray de Melgum	Portner Gren Bn	713
I Reserve Armeekorps; GdK Johann of Liechtenstein; 20,191; 11,152 inf 9,039 cav 54 guns	Division; FML Johann von Prochaska	Brigade; GM Albrecht Murray de Melgum	Leningen Gren Bn	742
I Reserve Armeekorps; GdK Johann of Liechtenstein; 20,191; 11,152 inf 9,039 cav 54 guns	Division; FML Johann von Prochaska	Brigade; GM Karl Steyrer von Edelberg	Hahn Gren Bn	523
I Reserve Armeekorps; GdK Johann of Liechtenstein; 20,191; 11,152 inf 9,039 cav 54 guns	Division; FML Johann von Prochaska	Brigade; GM Karl Steyrer von Edelberg	Hohenlohe Gren Bn	708
I Reserve Armeekorps; GdK Johann of Liechtenstein; 20,191; 11,152 inf 9,039 cav 54 guns	Division; FML Johann von Prochaska	Brigade; GM Karl Steyrer von Edelberg	Legrand Gren Bn	744
I Reserve Armeekorps; GdK Johann of Liechtenstein; 20,191; 11,152 inf 9,039 cav 54 guns	Division; FML Johann von Prochaska	Brigade; GM Karl Steyrer von Edelberg	Demontant Gren Bn	778
I Reserve Armeekorps; GdK Johann of Liechtenstein; 20,191; 11,152 inf 9,039 cav 54 guns	Division; FML Johann von Prochaska	Artillery	6-pdr Brigade Battery	6 guns
I Reserve Armeekorps; GdK Johann of Liechtenstein; 20,191; 11,152 inf 9,039 cav 54 guns	Division; FML Frederick of Hesse-Homburg	Brigade; GM Karl von Kroyher	Kaiser Cuirassier Regiment Nr. 1	522
I Reserve Armeekorps; GdK Johann of Liechtenstein; 20,191; 11,152 inf 9,039 cav 54 guns	Division; FML Frederick of Hesse-Homburg	Brigade; GM Karl von Kroyher	Liechtenstein Cuirassier Regiment Nr. 6	567
I Reserve Armeekorps; GdK Johann of Liechtenstein; 20,191; 11,152 inf 9,039 cav 54 guns	Division; FML Frederick of Hesse-Homburg	Brigade; GM Karl von Kroyher	6-pdr Cavalry Battery	6 guns
I Reserve Armeekorps; GdK Johann of Liechtenstein; 20,191; 11,152 inf 9,039 cav 54 guns	Division; FML Frederick of Hesse-Homburg	Brigade; GM Ignaz von Lederer	Archduke Ferdinand Cuirassier Regiment Nr. 4	518
I Reserve Armeekorps; GdK Johann of Liechtenstein; 20,191; 11,152 inf 9,039 cav 54 guns	Division; FML Frederick of Hesse-Homburg	Brigade; GM Ignaz von Lederer	Hohenzollern Cuirassier Regiment Nr. 8	599
I Reserve Armeekorps; GdK Johann of Liechtenstein; 20,191; 11,152 inf 9,039 cav 54 guns	Division; FML Frederick of Hesse-Homburg	Brigade; GM Ignaz von Lederer	6-pdr Cavalry Battery	6 guns
I Reserve Armeekorps; GdK Johann of Liechtenstein; 20,191; 11,152 inf 9,039 cav 54 guns	Division; FML Frederick of Hesse-Homburg	Brigade; GM Heinrich Bersina von Siegenthal (Note: Siegenthal is listed as a brigade commander twice. See II Armeekorps. (Bowden & Tarbox, pp. 90, 92))	Archduke Albert Cuirassier Regiment Nr. 3	533
I Reserve Armeekorps; GdK Johann of Liechtenstein; 20,191; 11,152 inf 9,039 cav 54 guns	Division; FML Frederick of Hesse-Homburg	Brigade; GM Heinrich Bersina von Siegenthal	Archduke Franz Cuirassier Regiment Nr. 2	530
I Reserve Armeekorps; GdK Johann of Liechtenstein; 20,191; 11,152 inf 9,039 cav 54 guns	Division; FML Frederick of Hesse-Homburg	Brigade; GM Heinrich Bersina von Siegenthal	6-pdr Cavalry Battery	6 guns
I Reserve Armeekorps; GdK Johann of Liechtenstein; 20,191; 11,152 inf 9,039 cav 54 guns	Division; FML Michael von Kienmayer	Brigade; GM Simon Dolmaire de Provenchères	O'Reilly Chevau-léger Regiment Nr. 3	670
I Reserve Armeekorps; GdK Johann of Liechtenstein; 20,191; 11,152 inf 9,039 cav 54 guns	Division; FML Michael von Kienmayer	Brigade; GM Simon Dolmaire de Provenchères	Rosenberg Chevau-léger Regiment Nr. 6	555
I Reserve Armeekorps; GdK Johann of Liechtenstein; 20,191; 11,152 inf 9,039 cav 54 guns	Division; FML Michael von Kienmayer	Brigade; GM Simon Dolmaire de Provenchères	6-pdr Cavalry Battery	6 guns
I Reserve Armeekorps; GdK Johann of Liechtenstein; 20,191; 11,152 inf 9,039 cav 54 guns	Division; FML Michael von Kienmayer	Brigade; GM Heinrich von Rottermund	Archduke John Dragoon Regiment Nr. 1	713
I Reserve Armeekorps; GdK Johann of Liechtenstein; 20,191; 11,152 inf 9,039 cav 54 guns	Division; FML Michael von Kienmayer	Brigade; GM Heinrich von Rottermund	Riesch Dragoon Regiment Nr. 6	623
I Reserve Armeekorps; GdK Johann of Liechtenstein; 20,191; 11,152 inf 9,039 cav 54 guns	Division; FML Michael von Kienmayer	Brigade; GM Heinrich von Rottermund	6-pdr Cavalry Battery	6 guns
I Reserve Armeekorps; GdK Johann of Liechtenstein; 20,191; 11,152 inf 9,039 cav 54 guns	Division; FML Michael von Kienmayer	Brigade; GM Joseph Clary und Aldringen (Note: Clary is listed as a brigade commander twice. See I Armeekorps. (Bowden & Tarbox, pp. 89, 92))	Knesevich Dragoon Regiment Nr. 3	644
I Reserve Armeekorps; GdK Johann of Liechtenstein; 20,191; 11,152 inf 9,039 cav 54 guns	Division; FML Michael von Kienmayer	Brigade; GM Joseph Clary und Aldringen	6-pdr Cavalry Battery	6 guns
I Reserve Armeekorps; GdK Johann of Liechtenstein; 20,191; 11,152 inf 9,039 cav 54 guns	Division; FML Michael von Kienmayer	Brigade; GM Peter von Vécsey	Vincent Chevau-léger Regiment Nr. 4	746
I Reserve Armeekorps; GdK Johann of Liechtenstein; 20,191; 11,152 inf 9,039 cav 54 guns	Division; FML Michael von Kienmayer	Brigade; GM Peter von Vécsey	Klenau Chevau-léger Regiment Nr. 5	780
I Reserve Armeekorps; GdK Johann of Liechtenstein; 20,191; 11,152 inf 9,039 cav 54 guns	Division; FML Michael von Kienmayer	Brigade; GM Ferdinand von Wartensleben	Blankenstein Hussar Regiment Nr. 6	1,039
I Reserve Armeekorps; GdK Johann of Liechtenstein; 20,191; 11,152 inf 9,039 cav 54 guns	Division; FML Michael von Kienmayer	Brigade; GM Ferdinand von Wartensleben	6-pdr Cavalry Battery	6 guns

== French Army ==
The Imperial French Army at Aspern-Essling counted 55,250 infantry, 14,105 cavalry, and 4,097 artillerymen, sappers, and engineers. All non-French units have a light yellow background.

- Emperor Napoleon
- Chief of staff: M Louis-Alexandre Berthier

French Imperial Guard, Cavalry Reserve, and II Corps - Battle of Aspern-Essling
Corps	Division	Brigade	Strength	Unit
Imperial Guard; 9,491; 7,878 inf 1,305 cav 308, 8 guns	1st Division; GD Philibert Jean-Baptiste Curial	Brigade; GB François Roguet	1,334	Gd Tirailleur Chasseur IR
Imperial Guard; 9,491; 7,878 inf 1,305 cav 308, 8 guns	1st Division; GD Philibert Jean-Baptiste Curial	Brigade; GB François Roguet	1.116	Gd Tirailleur Grenadier IR
Imperial Guard; 9,491; 7,878 inf 1,305 cav 308, 8 guns	1st Division; GD Philibert Jean-Baptiste Curial	Brigade; GB Jean-Louis Gros	1,272	Gd Fusilier Chasseur IR
Imperial Guard; 9,491; 7,878 inf 1,305 cav 308, 8 guns	1st Division; GD Philibert Jean-Baptiste Curial	Brigade; GB Jean-Louis Gros	1,313	Gd Fusilier Grenadier IR
Imperial Guard; 9,491; 7,878 inf 1,305 cav 308, 8 guns	2nd Division; GD Jean-Marie Dorsenne	not brigaded	1,519	Gd Foot Chasseur IR
Imperial Guard; 9,491; 7,878 inf 1,305 cav 308, 8 guns	2nd Division; GD Jean-Marie Dorsenne	not brigaded	1,324	Gd Foot Grenadier IR
Imperial Guard; 9,491; 7,878 inf 1,305 cav 308, 8 guns	3rd Division; GD Jean-Toussaint Arrighi	GB Claude-Étienne Guyot	363	Gd Horse Chasseur Regiment
Imperial Guard; 9,491; 7,878 inf 1,305 cav 308, 8 guns	3rd Division; GD Jean-Toussaint Arrighi	GB Claude-Étienne Guyot	219	Gd Horse Grenadier Regiment
Imperial Guard; 9,491; 7,878 inf 1,305 cav 308, 8 guns	3rd Division; GD Jean-Toussaint Arrighi	GB Claude-Étienne Guyot	254	Gd Empress Dragoon Regiment
Imperial Guard; 9,491; 7,878 inf 1,305 cav 308, 8 guns	3rd Division; GD Jean-Toussaint Arrighi	GB Wincenty Krasiński	414	1st Gd Chevau-léger Regiment
Imperial Guard; 9,491; 7,878 inf 1,305 cav 308, 8 guns	3rd Division; GD Jean-Toussaint Arrighi	GB Wincenty Krasiński	55	Gd Elite Gendarmes
Imperial Guard; 9,491; 7,878 inf 1,305 cav 308, 8 guns	Artillery	Maj Jean-François Boulart	308, 8 guns	Gd 12-pdr Foot Company; 4 x 12-pdr, 4 x 6-pdr
Cavalry Reserve; M Jean-Baptiste Bessières; 9,128; 0 inf 8,399 cav 24 guns	1st Heavy Cavalry Division; GD Étienne de Nansouty	Brigade; GB Jean-Marie Defrance	551	1st Carabinier Regiment
Cavalry Reserve; M Jean-Baptiste Bessières; 9,128; 0 inf 8,399 cav 24 guns	1st Heavy Cavalry Division; GD Étienne de Nansouty	Brigade; GB Jean-Marie Defrance	585	2nd Carabinier Regiment
Cavalry Reserve; M Jean-Baptiste Bessières; 9,128; 0 inf 8,399 cav 24 guns	1st Heavy Cavalry Division; GD Étienne de Nansouty	Brigade; GB Jean-Pierre Doumerc	551	2nd Cuirassier Regiment
Cavalry Reserve; M Jean-Baptiste Bessières; 9,128; 0 inf 8,399 cav 24 guns	1st Heavy Cavalry Division; GD Étienne de Nansouty	Brigade; GB Jean-Pierre Doumerc	587	9th Cuirassier Regiment
Cavalry Reserve; M Jean-Baptiste Bessières; 9,128; 0 inf 8,399 cav 24 guns	1st Heavy Cavalry Division; GD Étienne de Nansouty	Brigade; GB Antoine Decrest de Saint-Germain	551	3rd Cuirassier Regiment
Cavalry Reserve; M Jean-Baptiste Bessières; 9,128; 0 inf 8,399 cav 24 guns	1st Heavy Cavalry Division; GD Étienne de Nansouty	Brigade; GB Antoine Decrest de Saint-Germain	587	12th Cuirassier Regiment
Cavalry Reserve; M Jean-Baptiste Bessières; 9,128; 0 inf 8,399 cav 24 guns	1st Heavy Cavalry Division; GD Étienne de Nansouty	Artillery (291 men)	6 guns	8-pdr Horse Company; 4 x 8-pdr, 2 x 6-in how
Cavalry Reserve; M Jean-Baptiste Bessières; 9,128; 0 inf 8,399 cav 24 guns	1st Heavy Cavalry Division; GD Étienne de Nansouty	Artillery (291 men)	6 guns	8-pdr Horse Company; 4 x 8-pdr, 2 x 6-in how
Cavalry Reserve; M Jean-Baptiste Bessières; 9,128; 0 inf 8,399 cav 24 guns	2nd Heavy Cavalry Division; GD Raymond de Saint-Sulpice	Brigade; GB Armand de La Grange	527	1st Cuirassier Regiment
Cavalry Reserve; M Jean-Baptiste Bessières; 9,128; 0 inf 8,399 cav 24 guns	2nd Heavy Cavalry Division; GD Raymond de Saint-Sulpice	Brigade; GB Armand de La Grange	515	5th Cuirassier Regiment
Cavalry Reserve; M Jean-Baptiste Bessières; 9,128; 0 inf 8,399 cav 24 guns	2nd Heavy Cavalry Division; GD Raymond de Saint-Sulpice	Brigade; GB Adrien François Guiton	610	10th Cuirassier Regiment
Cavalry Reserve; M Jean-Baptiste Bessières; 9,128; 0 inf 8,399 cav 24 guns	2nd Heavy Cavalry Division; GD Raymond de Saint-Sulpice	Brigade; GB Adrien François Guiton	637	11th Cuirassier Regiment
Cavalry Reserve; M Jean-Baptiste Bessières; 9,128; 0 inf 8,399 cav 24 guns	2nd Heavy Cavalry Division; GD Raymond de Saint-Sulpice	Artillery	173, 6 guns	8-pdr Horse Company; 4 x 8-pdr, 2 x 6-in how
Cavalry Reserve; M Jean-Baptiste Bessières; 9,128; 0 inf 8,399 cav 24 guns	3rd Heavy Cavalry Division; GD Jean-Louis Espagne	Brigade; GB Nicolas Reynaud	633	4th Cuirassier Regiment
Cavalry Reserve; M Jean-Baptiste Bessières; 9,128; 0 inf 8,399 cav 24 guns	3rd Heavy Cavalry Division; GD Jean-Louis Espagne	Brigade; GB Nicolas Reynaud	655	6th Cuirassier Regiment
Cavalry Reserve; M Jean-Baptiste Bessières; 9,128; 0 inf 8,399 cav 24 guns	3rd Heavy Cavalry Division; GD Jean-Louis Espagne	Brigade; GB Albert Louis de Fouler	525	7th Cuirassier Regiment
Cavalry Reserve; M Jean-Baptiste Bessières; 9,128; 0 inf 8,399 cav 24 guns	3rd Heavy Cavalry Division; GD Jean-Louis Espagne	Brigade; GB Albert Louis de Fouler	766	8th Cuirassier Regiment
Cavalry Reserve; M Jean-Baptiste Bessières; 9,128; 0 inf 8,399 cav 24 guns	3rd Heavy Cavalry Division; GD Jean-Louis Espagne	Artillery	265, 6 guns	8-pdr Horse Company; 4 x 8-pdr, 2 x 6-in how
II Corps; M Jean Lannes; 22,788; 21,428 inf 0 cav 56 guns	1st Division; GD Jean Victor Tharreau	Brigade; GB Nicolas Conroux	2,500	6th, 9th, 16th, 24th, 25th, 27th Light IR, 4th Bns
II Corps; M Jean Lannes; 22,788; 21,428 inf 0 cav 56 guns	1st Division; GD Jean Victor Tharreau	Brigade; GB Joseph Albert	2,600	8th, 24th, 45th, 94th, 95th, 96th Line IR, 4th Bns
II Corps; M Jean Lannes; 22,788; 21,428 inf 0 cav 56 guns	1st Division; GD Jean Victor Tharreau	Brigade; GB Anatole Jarry	1,800	4th, 18th, 54th, 63rd Line IR, 4th Bns
II Corps; M Jean Lannes; 22,788; 21,428 inf 0 cav 56 guns	1st Division; GD Jean Victor Tharreau	Artillery	6 guns	8-pdr Foot Company; 4 x 8-pdr, 2 x 6-in how
II Corps; M Jean Lannes; 22,788; 21,428 inf 0 cav 56 guns	1st Division; GD Jean Victor Tharreau	Artillery	6 guns	4-pdr Horse Company; 6 x 4-pdr
II Corps; M Jean Lannes; 22,788; 21,428 inf 0 cav 56 guns	2nd Division; GD Michel Claparède	Brigade; GB Louis Coehorn	1,300	17th, 21st, 26th, 28th Light IR, 4th Bns
II Corps; M Jean Lannes; 22,788; 21,428 inf 0 cav 56 guns	2nd Division; GD Michel Claparède	Brigade; GB Louis Coehorn	450	Tirailleurs du Po Bn
II Corps; M Jean Lannes; 22,788; 21,428 inf 0 cav 56 guns	2nd Division; GD Michel Claparède	Brigade; GB Louis Coehorn	450	Tirailleurs Corses Bn
II Corps; M Jean Lannes; 22,788; 21,428 inf 0 cav 56 guns	2nd Division; GD Michel Claparède	Brigade; GB Joseph Lesuire	1,700	27th, 39th, 59th, 69th, 76th Line IR, 4th Bns
II Corps; M Jean Lannes; 22,788; 21,428 inf 0 cav 56 guns	2nd Division; GD Michel Claparède	Brigade; GB Florentin Ficatier	1,550	40th, 64th, 88th, 100th, 103rd Line IR, 4th Bns
II Corps; M Jean Lannes; 22,788; 21,428 inf 0 cav 56 guns	2nd Division; GD Michel Claparède	Artillery	6 guns	8-pdr Foot Company; 4 x 8-pdr, 2 x 24-in how
II Corps; M Jean Lannes; 22,788; 21,428 inf 0 cav 56 guns	2nd Division; GD Michel Claparède	Artillery	6 guns	4-pdr Horse Company; 4 x 4-pdr, 2 x 6-in how
II Corps; M Jean Lannes; 22,788; 21,428 inf 0 cav 56 guns	3rd Division; GD Louis de Saint-Hilaire	Brigade; GB Charles Marion	2,069	10th Light IR
II Corps; M Jean Lannes; 22,788; 21,428 inf 0 cav 56 guns	3rd Division; GD Louis de Saint-Hilaire	Brigade; GB Guillaume Lorencez	1,854	3rd Line IR
II Corps; M Jean Lannes; 22,788; 21,428 inf 0 cav 56 guns	3rd Division; GD Louis de Saint-Hilaire	Brigade; GB Guillaume Lorencez	1,548	57th Line IR
II Corps; M Jean Lannes; 22,788; 21,428 inf 0 cav 56 guns	3rd Division; GD Louis de Saint-Hilaire	Brigade; GB Jean Destabenrath	1,665	72nd Line IR
II Corps; M Jean Lannes; 22,788; 21,428 inf 0 cav 56 guns	3rd Division; GD Louis de Saint-Hilaire	Brigade; GB Jean Destabenrath	1,463	105th Line IR
II Corps; M Jean Lannes; 22,788; 21,428 inf 0 cav 56 guns	3rd Division; GD Louis de Saint-Hilaire	Artillery	8 guns	8-pdr Foot Company; 6 x 8-pdr, 2 x 6-in how
II Corps; M Jean Lannes; 22,788; 21,428 inf 0 cav 56 guns	3rd Division; GD Louis de Saint-Hilaire	Artillery	7 guns	6-pdr Horse Company; 5 x 6-pdr, 2 x 4-pdr
II Corps; M Jean Lannes; 22,788; 21,428 inf 0 cav 56 guns	Corps Reserve Artillery; GD Bondurand	not brigaded	8 guns	12-pdr Foot Company; 6 x 12-pdr, 2 x 24-in how
II Corps; M Jean Lannes; 22,788; 21,428 inf 0 cav 56 guns	Corps Reserve Artillery; GD Bondurand	not brigaded	9 guns	12-pdr Foot Company; 7 x 12-pdr, 2 x 24-in how

French IV Corps - Battle of Aspern-Essling
Corps	Division	Strength	Brigade	Unit
IV Corps; M André Masséna; 32,045; 25,944 inf 4,401 cav 64 guns	1st Division (Note: The 1st Division's Baden Brigade was on detached duty. (Bowden & Tarbox, p. 86)); GD Claude Legrand	4,268	Brigade; GB François Ledru des Essarts	26th Light IR
IV Corps; M André Masséna; 32,045; 25,944 inf 4,401 cav 64 guns	1st Division; GD Claude Legrand	4,268	Brigade; GB François Ledru des Essarts	18th Line IR
IV Corps; M André Masséna; 32,045; 25,944 inf 4,401 cav 64 guns	1st Division; GD Claude Legrand	14 guns	Artillery	6-pdr Foot Company; 6 x 6-pdr, 2 x 5.7-in how
IV Corps; M André Masséna; 32,045; 25,944 inf 4,401 cav 64 guns	1st Division; GD Claude Legrand	14 guns	Artillery	6-pdr Horse Company; 4 x 6-pdr, 2 x 5.7-in how
IV Corps; M André Masséna; 32,045; 25,944 inf 4,401 cav 64 guns	2nd Division; GD Claude Carra Saint-Cyr	7,149	Brigade; GB Antoine Cosson	24th Light IR
IV Corps; M André Masséna; 32,045; 25,944 inf 4,401 cav 64 guns	2nd Division; GD Claude Carra Saint-Cyr	7,149	Brigade; GB Jean Baptiste Dalesme	4th Line IR
IV Corps; M André Masséna; 32,045; 25,944 inf 4,401 cav 64 guns	2nd Division; GD Claude Carra Saint-Cyr	7,149	Brigade; GB Jean Baptiste Dalesme	46th Line IR
IV Corps; M André Masséna; 32,045; 25,944 inf 4,401 cav 64 guns	2nd Division; GD Claude Carra Saint-Cyr	14 guns	Artillery	6-pdr Foot Company; 6 x 6-pdr, 2 x 5.7-in how
IV Corps; M André Masséna; 32,045; 25,944 inf 4,401 cav 64 guns	2nd Division; GD Claude Carra Saint-Cyr	14 guns	Artillery	6-pdr Horse Company; 4 x 6-pdr, 2 x 5.7-in how
IV Corps; M André Masséna; 32,045; 25,944 inf 4,401 cav 64 guns	2nd Division; GD Claude Carra Saint-Cyr	2,500, 6 guns	HD Brigade; GM Karl Friedrich von Nagel	HD Leib-Garde IR, 1st Bn
IV Corps; M André Masséna; 32,045; 25,944 inf 4,401 cav 64 guns	2nd Division; GD Claude Carra Saint-Cyr	2,500, 6 guns	HD Brigade; GM Karl Friedrich von Nagel	HD Leib-Garde IR, 2nd Bn
IV Corps; M André Masséna; 32,045; 25,944 inf 4,401 cav 64 guns	2nd Division; GD Claude Carra Saint-Cyr	2,500, 6 guns	HD Brigade; GM Karl Friedrich von Nagel	HD Leib-Garde Fusilier Bn
IV Corps; M André Masséna; 32,045; 25,944 inf 4,401 cav 64 guns	2nd Division; GD Claude Carra Saint-Cyr	2,500, 6 guns	HD Brigade; GM Karl Friedrich von Nagel	HD Leib Fusilier Bn
IV Corps; M André Masséna; 32,045; 25,944 inf 4,401 cav 64 guns	2nd Division; GD Claude Carra Saint-Cyr	2,500, 6 guns	HD Brigade; GM Karl Friedrich von Nagel	HD 6-pdr Foot Company; 5 x 6-pdr, 1 x 5.7-in how
IV Corps; M André Masséna; 32,045; 25,944 inf 4,401 cav 64 guns	3rd Division; GD Gabriel Molitor	6,474	Brigade; GB François Leguay	2nd Line IR
IV Corps; M André Masséna; 32,045; 25,944 inf 4,401 cav 64 guns	3rd Division; GD Gabriel Molitor	6,474	Brigade; GB François Leguay	16th Line IR
IV Corps; M André Masséna; 32,045; 25,944 inf 4,401 cav 64 guns	3rd Division; GD Gabriel Molitor	6,474	Brigade; GB Raymond Viviès de La Prade	37th Line IR
IV Corps; M André Masséna; 32,045; 25,944 inf 4,401 cav 64 guns	3rd Division; GD Gabriel Molitor	6,474	Brigade; GB Raymond Viviès de La Prade	67th Line IR
IV Corps; M André Masséna; 32,045; 25,944 inf 4,401 cav 64 guns	3rd Division; GD Gabriel Molitor	6,474	Artillery	6-pdr Foot Company; 6 x 6-pdr
IV Corps; M André Masséna; 32,045; 25,944 inf 4,401 cav 64 guns	4th Division; GD Jean Boudet	5,553	Brigade; GB François Nicolas Fririon	3rd Light IR
IV Corps; M André Masséna; 32,045; 25,944 inf 4,401 cav 64 guns	4th Division; GD Jean Boudet	5,553	Brigade; GB Guy Louis Valory	56th Line IR
IV Corps; M André Masséna; 32,045; 25,944 inf 4,401 cav 64 guns	4th Division; GD Jean Boudet	5,553	Brigade; GB Guy Louis Valory	93rd Line IR
IV Corps; M André Masséna; 32,045; 25,944 inf 4,401 cav 64 guns	4th Division; GD Jean Boudet	5,553	Artillery	6-pdr Foot Company; 6 x 6-pdr
IV Corps; M André Masséna; 32,045; 25,944 inf 4,401 cav 64 guns	Corps Cavalry; GB Jacob Marulaz	1,520	not brigaded	3rd Horse Chasseur Regiment
IV Corps; M André Masséna; 32,045; 25,944 inf 4,401 cav 64 guns	Corps Cavalry; GB Jacob Marulaz	1,520	not brigaded	14th Horse Chasseur Regiment
IV Corps; M André Masséna; 32,045; 25,944 inf 4,401 cav 64 guns	Corps Cavalry; GB Jacob Marulaz	1,520	not brigaded	19th Horse Chasseur Regiment
IV Corps; M André Masséna; 32,045; 25,944 inf 4,401 cav 64 guns	Corps Cavalry; GB Jacob Marulaz	1,520	not brigaded	23rd Horse Chasseur Regiment
IV Corps; M André Masséna; 32,045; 25,944 inf 4,401 cav 64 guns	Corps Cavalry; GB Jacob Marulaz	290	not brigaded	Baden Light Dragoon Regiment
IV Corps; M André Masséna; 32,045; 25,944 inf 4,401 cav 64 guns	Corps Cavalry; GB Jacob Marulaz	150	not brigaded	HD Chevau-léger Regiment
IV Corps; M André Masséna; 32,045; 25,944 inf 4,401 cav 64 guns	Light Cavalry Division; GD Antoine de Lasalle	1,241	Brigade; GB Hippolyte Piré	8th Hussar Regiment
IV Corps; M André Masséna; 32,045; 25,944 inf 4,401 cav 64 guns	Light Cavalry Division; GD Antoine de Lasalle	1,241	Brigade; GB Hippolyte Piré	16th Horse Chasseur Regiment
IV Corps; M André Masséna; 32,045; 25,944 inf 4,401 cav 64 guns	Light Cavalry Division; GD Antoine de Lasalle	1,200	Brigade; GB Jean Bruyère	13th Horse Chasseur Regiment
IV Corps; M André Masséna; 32,045; 25,944 inf 4,401 cav 64 guns	Light Cavalry Division; GD Antoine de Lasalle	1,200	Brigade; GB Jean Bruyère	24th Horse Chasseur Regiment
IV Corps; M André Masséna; 32,045; 25,944 inf 4,401 cav 64 guns	Light Cavalry Division; GD Antoine de Lasalle	?	not brigaded	Württemberg Chevau-léger Regiment
IV Corps; M André Masséna; 32,045; 25,944 inf 4,401 cav 64 guns	Corps Reserve Artillery; GD Joseph Marie de Pernety	16 guns	not brigaded	12-pdr Foot Company; 6 x 12-pdr, 2 x 5.7-in how
IV Corps; M André Masséna; 32,045; 25,944 inf 4,401 cav 64 guns	Corps Reserve Artillery; GD Joseph Marie de Pernety	16 guns	not brigaded	Mixed Foot Company; 2 x 12-pdr, 4 x 6-pdr, 2 x 5.7-in how

== See also ==
- List of orders of battle

== Notes ==
Footnotes

Citations
