= Senator Brady =

Senator Brady may refer to:

== Members of the United States Senate ==
- James H. Brady (1862–1918), U.S. Senator from Idaho
- Nicholas F. Brady (born 1930), U.S. Senator from New Jersey

== United States state senate members ==
- Bill Brady (politician) (born 1961), Illinois State Senate
- Dan Brady (Ohio politician) (fl. 1980s–2010s), Ohio State Senate
- Francis P. Brady (1870–1926), Illinois State Senate
- Frank J. Brady (1894–1964), Nebraska State Senate
- John Leeford Brady (1866–1933), Kansas State Senate
- John Thomas Brady (1830–1890), Texas State Senate
- William Robert Brady (1956–2023), Kansas State Senate
