= James Brady (disambiguation) =

James Brady (1940–2014) was an assistant to the U.S. President and the fifteenth White House Press Secretary under President Ronald Reagan.

James Brady, Jim Brady or Jimmy Brady may also refer to:

== Law ==
- James Joseph Brady (1944–2017), American lawyer
- James T. Brady (1815–1869), American lawyer

== Politics ==
- James Charles Brady (1876–1962), Canadian politician, school principal and teacher
- James Dennis Brady (1843–1900), U.S. Representative from Virginia
- James H. Brady (1862–1918), Republican politician from Idaho who served as the state's governor and a U.S. senator representing the state
- James J. Brady (Illinois official) (1878–1941), Illinois state auditor
- James P. Brady (born 1908), Canadian Métis political leader

== Sports ==
- James Cox Brady Jr. (1907–1971), American financier and horseman
- Jim Brady (baseball) (1936–2024), American economist, retired university educator and administrator, and a former left-handed pitcher in professional baseball
- Jim Brady (boxer) (1913–1980), Scottish professional bantam/feather/lightweight boxer
- Jim Brady (quarterback) (1907–1984), American football player and broadcasting entrepreneur
- Jim Brady (rugby league), former professional rugby league footballer
- Jim Brady (rugby union) (born 1931), Irish rugby union player
- Jim Brady (sailor) (born 1963), American former competitive sailor
- Jimmy Brady (1901–1976), Irish Olympic water polo player

== Others ==
- James Brady (columnist) (1928–2009), American celebrity columnist
- James Brady (criminal) (1875–1904), American criminal
- James Brady (Medal of Honor) (1842–1904), American soldier
- James Brady (SS) (1920–?), one of two Irishmen known to have served in the Waffen-SS during World War II
- James J. Brady (physicist), (1904–1993), American physicist
- James M. Brady, American journalist and an expert in digital journalism
- Jim Brady (journalist), American journalist and entrepreneur
- Jim Brady (1944–2019), a member of The Sandpipers
- Diamond Jim Brady (1856–1917), American businessman, financier and philanthropist of the Gilded Age
