= Charles Marion =

Charles Marion may refer to:

- Charles Marion (politician) (1887–1944), French assassinated politician, general and Olympic equestrian
- Charles Stanislas Marion (1758–1812), French general
- Charles R. Marion (fl. 1940s–1950s), American screenwriter
