= David Brady =

David Brady may refer to:

- David Brady (Gaelic footballer) (born 1974), Irish Gaelic footballer
- David Brady (politician) (1937–2023), American politician
- David J. Brady, American optical scientist
- David W. Brady (born 1940), American political scientist

== See also ==
- Dave Brady (1930–1988), American sportswriter
