= Frank Brady =

Frank Brady may refer to:

- Frank Brady Sr. (1891–1971), Irish footballer
- Frank Brady Jr. (1948–2009), Irish footballer, great-nephew of Frank Brady Sr.
- Frank J. Brady (1894–1964), American politician from Nebraska
- Frank Brady (writer) (born 1934), American writer

== See also ==
- Francis Brady (disambiguation)
- Brady (surname)
