= Joan Brady =

Joan Brady may refer to:

- Joan Brady (American-British writer) (1939–2024), winner of the Whitbread Book of the Year
- Joan Brady (Christian novelist) (born 1950), American writer of Christian novels
- Joan B. Brady, member of the South Carolina House of Representatives
