= Tom Bradley =

Tom or Thomas Bradley may refer to:

== Politics and law ==
- Thomas W. Bradley (1844–1920), U.S. Representative from New York State and Medal of Honor recipient
- Thomas J. Bradley (1870–1901), U.S. Representative from New York State
- Tom Bradley (mayor) (1917–1998), Mayor of Los Angeles, California, 1973–1993
- Tom Bradley (British politician) (1926–2002), British Member of Parliament and trade union leader
- Thomas S. Bradley (born 1948), member of the Kansas House of Representatives
- Thomas Bradley (judge), Australian judge and governor of Queensland from 2026

== Religion ==
- Thomas Scrope (died 1491/2), or (de) Bradley, English bishop, Bishop of Dromore and Assistant Bishop of Norwich
- Thomas Bradley (priest) (1596/7–1673), Anglican clergyman, chaplain to the King
- Thomas Earnshaw Bradley, British founder of the Catholic periodical The Lamp in 1846

== Literature ==
- Thomas Bradley (physician) (1751–1813), English physician and editor
- Tom Bradley (author) (born 1954), American novelist and essayist

== Sports ==
- Tom Bradley (baseball) (born 1947), American Major League baseball player
- Tom Bradley (American football coach) (born 1956), American football coach and former player

== Places ==
- Tom Bradley International Terminal, an airport terminal at Los Angeles International Airport named after the above mayor

== See also ==
- Tom Brady (disambiguation)
