= Paul Bradley =

Paul Bradley may refer to:

- Paul Bradley (English actor) (born 1955), English television actor
- Paul Bradley (Canadian actor) (1940–2003), Canadian actor
- Paul Bradley (fighter) (born 1983), American mixed martial artist
- Paul Bradley, British producer for films such as Jefferson in Paris
- Paul J. Bradley (born 1945), American Roman Catholic bishop

== See also ==
- Bradley Paul (born 1972), American poet
- Paul Brady (disambiguation)
