= Thomas Brady =

Thomas Brady may refer to:

== Government ==
- Thomas Brady (general) (1752–1827), Irish general in the Austrian army
- Thomas Brady (mayor) (1850–1928), American politician
- Thomas "Bud" Brady (1938–2011), member of the Louisiana House of Representatives
- Thomas J. Brady (1839–1904), American Civil War general and Second Assistant Postmaster General
- Thomas Pickens Brady (1903–1973), segregationist and justice on the Mississippi Supreme Court

== Sports ==
- Thomas Brady (canoeist) (born 1991), British slalom canoeist
- Tom Brady (born 1977), American football quarterback
- Tom Brady (rugby union) (born 1991), English rugby union player
- Tom Brady (Australian footballer) (1892–1945), Australian rules footballer

== Other ==
- Tom Brady (film director) (born 1964), American director, writer and producer

== See also ==
- Tomás Brady (born 1987), Gaelic footballer and hurler
- Tom Bradby (born 1967), British journalist
- Tom Bradley (disambiguation)
