= Francis Brady =

Francis Brady may refer to:

- Sir Francis William Brady, 2nd Baronet (1824–1909) of the Brady Baronets
- Francis X. Brady (1857–1911), American Jesuit priest
- Francis Brady, fictional character in The Butcher Boy (novel)

== See also ==
- Frank Brady (disambiguation)
- Brady (surname)
