= Chris Brody =

Chris Brody may refer to:

- Chris Brody (character), a character from the TV series Homeland
- Chris Brody, a character from the TV series Haven

== See also ==
- Christopher Brady (disambiguation)
