= Mike Johnston (Kansas politician) =

American politician

Member of the Kansas Senate from the 14th district
- In office January 10, 1977 – January 15, 1991
- Succeeded by: William Robert Brady

Personal details
- Born: July 29, 1945 Parsons, Kansas
- Party: Democratic
- Education: Pittsburg State University

Michael Louis Johnston (born July 29, 1945) is an American former politician who served in the Kansas State Senate as a Democrat for 15 years.

Johnston was born in Parsons, Kansas, and moved away to attend Pittsburg State University, after which he worked for the Kansas Department of Human Resources (a predecessor to the Kansas Department of Labor). In 1976, he returned to Parsons and challenged the incumbent Senator.

Johnston successfully won election in 1976 and served in the Senate from 1977 to 1990, winning re-election in 1980, 1984 and 1988. He was the Senate minority leader from 1985 until 1990, when he resigned his seat to take office as the Kansas Secretary of Transportation under newly-elected governor Joan Finney. In 1995, he was named CEO of the Kansas Turnpike, and held that position until his retirement from state service in 2010. After leaving government, Johnston briefly worked as a lobbyist for the League of Kansas Municipalities.
