= Texas Transportation Company (1866–1896) =

American transportation company

Overview
- Headquarters: Clinton, Texas (now Houston)
- Locale: Houston area
- Dates of operation: 1866–1896

Technical
- Track gauge: 4 ft 8 1/2 in (1,435 mm) standard gauge

The Texas Transportation Company (1866–1896) was one of two railroads bearing the same name. The Texas Transportation Company gained its charter on September 6, 1866. John Thomas Brady promoted the company and some work was completed, but it did not operate as a railroad in the late-1860s.

Steamboat magnate Charles Morgan purchased the company and its charter in 1876. Dissatisfied with the high cost of transferring his steamship freight to Texas through Galveston, Morgan constructed a seven-mile railroad from Clinton, Texas to the Fifth Ward in Houston. He established Clinton as a railhead on the northern bank of Buffalo Bayou, allowing his steamers to bypass Galveston to through the bay and closer to Houston. His short line railroad was designed to interoperate with every outbound railroad from the Fifth Ward. His company commenced laying tracks with supplies delivered by his own steamship on April 21, 1876, and he started rolling trains in September.

Texas Transportation Company reported total gross profits of $9,000 in 1891 and total gross earnings of $36,000 in 1895. The Texas and New Orleans Railroad acquired the company the next year, and both later operated as divisions of the Southern Pacific system.

== See also ==
- Galveston Bay
- List of Texas railroads
