= Tony Asimus =

American politician (1896–1968)

Member of the Nebraska Legislature from the 28th district
- In office January 7, 1941 – January 2, 1945
- Preceded by: Frank J. Brady
- Succeeded by: Dennis Cronin

Personal details
- Born: October 19, 1896 Ord, Nebraska
- Died: January 14, 1968 (aged 71) O'Neill, Nebraska
- Party: Democratic
- Spouse: Helen
- Children: 2
- Occupation: Grocer, petroleum dealer

Tony Asimus (October 19, 1896 – January 14, 1968) was a Democratic politician from Nebraska who served as a member of the Nebraska Legislature from the 28th district from 1941 to 1945.

== Early life ==
Asimus was born near Ord, Nebraska, in 1896. He owned and operated a grocery store and was a petroleum dealer in O'Neill, where he settled.

== Nebraska Legislature ==
In 1940, State Senator Frank J. Brady ran for re-election in the 28th district, which included Boyd, Holt, Keya Paha, and Rock counties. Asimus again against him, and placed second in the primary, winning 29 percent of the vote to Brady's 44 percent, and the two advanced to the general election. Though the race was formally nonpartisan, Brady had served in the bicameral legislature as a member of the Nebraska Republican Party, and Asimus was a Democrat. Asimus defeated Brady by a narrow margin, receiving 51 percent of the vote in the general election to Brady's 49 percent.

Asimus ran for re-election in 1942, and was challenged by seven opponents. Asimus won 27 percent of the vote in the primary, while former State Senator Ross Amspoker received 20 percent of the vote and placed second. In the general election, Asimus defeated Amspoker, 59–41 percent.

In 1944, Asimus announced that he would not seek re-election.

== Death ==
Asimus died on January 14, 1968.
