= Marvin Barkis =

American politician (1943–2024)

Speaker of the Kansas House of Representatives
- In office January 14, 1991 – January 11, 1993
- Preceded by: James Braden
- Succeeded by: Tim Shallenburger

Member of the Kansas House of Representatives from the 6th district
- In office January 14, 1991 – January 11, 1993
- Preceded by: William Robert Brady
- Succeeded by: Jene Vickrey

Member of the Kansas House of Representatives from the 15th district
- In office January 8, 1979 – January 14, 1991
- Preceded by: Alva Powell
- Succeeded by: Ruth Hackler

Personal details
- Born: January 22, 1943 Kansas City, Missouri, U.S.
- Died: July 19, 2024 (aged 81) Paola, Kansas, U.S.
- Party: Democratic
- Education: Ottawa University (BA); Stanford University (JD)

Marvin Barkis (January 22, 1943 – July 19, 2024) was an American politician who served in the Kansas House of Representatives from the 6th district from 1979 to 1993. He served as Speaker of the Kansas House of Representatives from 1991 to 1993.

Marvin died in Paola, Kansas on July 19, 2024, at the age of 81.
