= William Brady =

William Brady may refer to:

- William Brady (footballer) (born 1870), Scottish footballer
- William Brady (physician) (1880–1972), American physician and columnist
- William A. Brady (1863–1950), American boxing manager and play producer
- William Gage Brady Jr. (1888–1966), chairman of the National City Bank of New York
- William H. Brady (1912–1996), Episcopal bishop of Fond du Lac in America
- William J. Brady (1829–1878), sheriff of Lincoln County during the Lincoln County Wars in New Mexico, USA
- William Maziere Brady (1825–1894), Irish priest, ecclesiastical historian and journalist
- William O. Brady (1899–1961), Roman Catholic archbishop in America
- William Robert Brady (1956–2023), Kansas state legislator
- William V. Brady (1811–1870), mayor of New York 1847–1848
- Will P. Brady (1876–1943), American lawyer and judge

== See also ==
- Bill Brady (disambiguation)
