= Arthur Brady =

Arthur Brady is the name of:

- Arthur Brady (footballer), Scottish footballer in the 1890s
- Arthur Brady (politician) (died 1954), Scottish politician and trade unionist
