= Kathleen Brady =

Kathleen Brady may be:

- Kathleen T. Brady (born 1952), American psychiatrist
- Kathleen Brady (historian) (born c. 1946), American historian
