= General Brady =

General Brady may refer to:

- Hugh Brady (general) (1768–1851), U.S. Army major general
- Patrick Henry Brady (born 1936), U.S. Army major general
- Roger A. Brady (born 1946), U.S. Air Force four-star general
- Thomas Brady (general) (c. 1752–1827), Irish lieutenant general (feldzeugmeister) in the Austrian army

== See also ==
- Attorney General Brady (disambiguation)
