= Vera Brady Shipman =

American journalist (1889–1932)

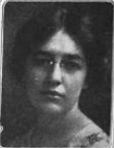
- Vera Brady Shipman, from a 1918 publication.
- Born: Vera Corinne Brady; May 26, 1889; Salina, Kansas
- Died: February 11, 1932 (aged 42); Chicago, Illinois
- Occupations: journalist, composer, clubwoman
- Known for: arts journalism, concert promoter

Vera Brady Shipman (May 26, 1889 – February 11, 1932) was an American composer, journalist, talent manager, and concert promoter, based in Kansas and Chicago.

== Early life ==
Vera Corinne Brady was born in Salina, Kansas, the daughter of John Leeford Brady and Julia Mary Simons Hoinville. Her father was a newspaper editor in Kansas, and later in Oregon and Idaho. He also served in both houses of the Kansas Legislature, between 1904 and 1913. Her uncle was James H. Brady, Governor of Idaho. Her mother lived in Chicago. Vera Brady attended Hyde Park Academy High School in Chicago, and the Cosmopolitan School of Music.

== Career ==
Shipman taught music and played in churches as a young woman. She played piano accompaniment for various vocalists and instrumentalists, including singer Permelia Gale and cellist Vera Poppe. She wrote music, including a setting of "Po' Li'l Lamb" by Paul Laurence Dunbar, a song sung by her client Rosa Olitzka in concerts. She composed the music for Twenty Little Songs for Children (1914), with lyrics by Francesca de Capdevila (who later married cellist Pablo Casals).

Shipman was an arts journalist. She wrote for Radio Digest, Social Progress, Musical America, and was music and literary editor of The Salina Daily Union. She also wrote film reviews, and was a correspondent from the Republican National Convention in Chicago in 1920. She was heard on radio in the 1920s, including a report from Mardi Gras festivities in New Orleans in 1923. She was a vice president of the Chicago chapter of American Pen Women of Illinois. She was a publicist for a Chicago department store, and she booked tours and managed musical performers.

== Personal life ==
Brady married Melville Percy Shipman, a newspaper colleague of her father's, in 1913. They had two daughters, Mary Juliet Shipman (1915–1986) and Sarah Ann Shipman (1921–1926). Vera Brady Shipman moved from Kansas to Chicago in 1922. She died in 1932, aged 42 years, in a Chicago hotel room, possibly by suicide, though her family announced that she died from a heart attack. Her grave is in Lawrence, Kansas.
