= David J. Brady =

American optical scientist

- Education: California Institute of Technology (PhD, MS); Macalester College (BA)
- Scientific career
- Fields: Optical sciences, computational imaging
- Workplaces: University of Arizona

David J. Brady is an American optical scientist and engineer known for his work in computational imaging, compressive sensing, and gigapixel array camera systems. He is the J. W. and H. M. Goodman Endowed Chair in Optical Sciences at the University of Arizona.

== Education ==
Brady received a Bachelor of Arts degree, summa cum laude, in physics and mathematics from Macalester College in 1984 and completed a Master of Science (1986) and Ph.D. (1990) in applied physics at the California Institute of Technology. His doctoral research explored holographic neural processing.

== Career ==
Brady began his academic career at the University of Illinois at Urbana-Champaign and later held professorships at Duke University, including Director of the Fitzpatrick Institute for Photonics, and the University of Arizona. From 2021 to 2026, he was appointed the J. W. and H. M. Goodman Endowed Chair in Optical Sciences at the University of Arizona.

== Research ==
Brady’s research integrates optical system design with computational reconstruction, including snapshot compressive imaging and compressive holography. He co-authored research that described multiscale gigapixel photography in Nature, demonstrating high-resolution array camera systems. His array camera development received independent mention in science media, including coverage of gigapixel camera technology in The Scientist. He and colleagues’ work on high-resolution imaging also appeared in Physics World. An independent interview with Brady discussed his perspectives on imaging technologies and his career.

== Recognition ==
- In 2023, Brady received the Emmett N. Leith Medal from Optica for contributions to sparse holography and computational imaging.
- He was also awarded the SPIE Dennis Gabor Award in diffractive optics.
- In 1990, he was awarded The David and Lucile Packard Foundation fellow.
- Brady is a Fellow of Optica, SPIE, and IEEE.

== Selected works ==
- Brady, David J. Optical Imaging and Spectroscopy. Wiley-OSA, 2009.
- Brady, David J. Computational Optical Imaging. SPIE, 2025.
