= Pat Brady =

Pat Brady may refer to:

- Pat Brady (actor) (1914–1972), best known as the "comical sidekick" to Roy Rogers
- Pat Brady (cartoonist) (born 1947), American cartoonist and creator of Rose Is Rose
- Pat Brady (footballer) (1936–2020), Irish footballer who played in England
- Pat Brady (gridiron football) (1926–2009), American gridiron football quarterback and punter
- Pat Brady (politician), American politician from Illinois
