= Laurie Brady =

Australian rules footballer

Personal information
- Full name: Patrick Lawrence Brady
- Born: 16 March 1895; Melbourne, Victoria
- Died: 1 May 1944 (aged 49); Caulfield, Victoria
- Original team: Birregurra

Playing career^{1}
Years	Club	Games (Goals)
1913	Melbourne	1 (0)
- ^{1} Playing statistics correct to the end of 1913.

Patrick Lawrence Brady (16 March 1895 – 1 May 1944) was an Australian rules footballer who played with Melbourne in the Victorian Football League (VFL).

Brady was awarded the Meritorious Service Medal during World War I and served again in World War II. He died from illness while on active service on 1 May 1944.
