= Jim Brady (rugby union) =

Rugby union player from Northern Ireland

- Full name: James Robert Brady
- Born: 11 February 1931 (age 95) Belfast, Northern Ireland
- Height: 5 ft 11 in (180 cm)
- Weight: 15 st (210 lb; 95 kg)
- School: Belfast High School

Rugby union career
- Position: Lock
International career
Years	Team	Apps	(Points)
1951–57	Ireland	12	(0)

James Robert Brady (born 11 February 1931) is an Irish former international rugby union player.

A Belfast native, Brady was educated at Belfast High School and represented Ulster from schoolboys level. He played his senior rugby for Belfast's CIYMS club and won Ireland selection in his first season of top-grade rugby.

Brady, a bank clerk by profession, was capped 12 times by Ireland as second-row forward. He featured twice in Ireland's championship-winning 1951 Five Nations campaign and was the first CIYMS product to play international rugby.

== See also ==
- List of Ireland national rugby union players
