= Robert Brady =

Robert, Robbie or Bob Brady may refer to:

- Robert Brady (criminal) (1904–1934), American bank robber and Depression-era outlaw
- Robert Brady (writer) (1627–1700), English historian and physician
- Robert A. Brady (1901–1963), American economist
- Robert David Brady (born 1946), American modernist sculptor
- Robert W. Brady (1825–1891), American Catholic priest and educator
- Robbie Brady (born 1992), Irish football player
- Bob Brady (born 1945), United States congressman
- Bob Brady (baseball) (1922–1996), Major League Baseball player
- Bob Brady (Canadian football) (1931–2018), Canadian football player

== See also ==
- List of The Brady Bunch characters, for Bobby Brady
