= Matthew Brady (disambiguation) =

Matthew Brady (1799–1826) was an Australian bushranger.

Matthew Brady may also refer to:

- Matthew Brady (footballer) (born 1977), former English footballer
- Matthew Brady (lawyer) (1876–1952), San Francisco district attorney
- Matthew Francis Brady (1893–1959), American prelate of the Roman Catholic Church
- Matthew Harrison Brady, the antagonist of Jerome Lawrence and Robert Lee's play Inherit the Wind
- Matthew P. Brady (1875–1955) American Thoroughbred racehorse trainer and owner

== See also ==
- Mathew Brady (1822–1896), American photographer who documented the American Civil War
- Matt Brady (born 1965), head men's basketball coach at James Madison University
