= James Brady (Medal of Honor) =

- Born: 1842; Boston, Massachusetts
- Died: October 7, 1904 (aged 61–62); New Hampshire
- Burial place: Raymond, New Hampshire
- Military career
- Allegiance: United States of America
- Branch: United States Army; Union Army
- Rank: Private
- Units: 10th Regiment New Hampshire Volunteer Infantry, Irish Regiment
- Conflicts: Battle of Chaffin's Farm
- Awards: Medal of Honor

James Brady (1842 – October 7, 1904) was an American soldier who received the Medal of Honor for valor during the American Civil War.

== Biography ==
Brady served in the American Civil War in the 10th Regiment New Hampshire Volunteer Infantry, Irish Regiment, for the Union Army. He was awarded the Medal of Honor on April 6, 1865, for his actions at the Battle of Chaffin's Farm.

== Medal of Honor citation ==
Citation:

Capture of flag.

== See also ==
- List of American Civil War Medal of Honor recipients: A-F
