= David W. Brady =

American political scientist and professor

- Born: Kankakee, IL
- Education: Western Illinois University; University of Iowa
- Awards: Dinkelspiel Award, Richard Lyman Prize, Bob Davies award
- Scientific career
- Fields: Political Science and Leadership Values
- Workplaces: Stanford University

David Brady is the Bowen H. and Janice Arthur McCoy (chaired) Professor of Political Science and Leadership Values at Stanford University. While at Stanford, he has received the Dinkelspiel Award for service to undergraduates, the Richard Lyman Prize for service to alumni, the Bob Davies award, the Jaedicke silver cup from the Graduate School of Business, and the first Phi Beta Kappa Teaching Award given at Stanford. He is also a member of the American Academy of Arts and Sciences.

== Biography ==
One of six children, David Brady grew up in Kankakee, IL. Like his siblings, he was educated in parochial schools, and following high school he went to work in a furniture factory. After injuring his hand in an industrial accident, he enrolled at Western Illinois University, graduating in 1963. Brady earned his Ph.D. from the University of Iowa in 1970. Prior to Stanford, he taught at Rice University, the University of Houston, and Kansas State University. He spent several years as Chairman of the Department of Political Science at both schools.

At Stanford, he previously held the Morris M. Doyle Centennial Chair in Public Policy and was the Associate Dean for the Stanford Graduate School of Business. He also served as the deputy director of the Hoover Institution, where he is currently a Senior Fellow. Brady's other institutional appointments have included Vice Provost for Distance Learning and the Chairmanship of the university's Committee on Undergraduate Studies.

== Research ==
Brady is a leading on expert on issues of equality and political effectiveness; that is: when political systems and organizations work better or worse, and has written or co-written numerous articles and books on these topics, including: Leadership and Growth (World Bank Publications, 2010) coedited with Michael Spence, Revolving Gridlock: Politics and Policy from Carter to Bush II (Westview Press, 2006), and Red and Blue Nation? Characteristics and Causes of America’s Polarized Politics with Pietro Nivola (Brookings Institution Press, 2007). His current research focuses on the U.S. Congress, the party system, and congressional decision-making. Brady is also a frequent contributor to the popular political website RealClearPolitics.

== Books ==
A Transformation of American Politics, 1936–2016

The Rule of Law in South Korea

Leadership and Growth

Red and Blue Nation? Volume I

Red and Blue Nation? Volume II

Revolving Gridlock: Politics and Policy from Jimmy Carter to George W. Bush

Party, Process, and Political Change in Congress

Change and Continuity in House Elections

Revolving Gridlock

Critical Elections and Congressional Policy Making

Public Policy and Politics in America

American Public Policy in the 1980s

Congressional Voting in a Partisan Era: A Comparison of the McKinley House to the Modern House
