= Ed Brady =

Ed Brady may refer to:

- Ed Brady (American football) (born 1962), American football player
- Ed Brady (actor) (1889–1942), American film actor
