= John Leeford Brady =

American politician (1866–1933)

Member of the Kansas Senate
- In office 1909–1913

Member of the Kansas House of Representatives
- In office 1905–1906

Personal details
- Born: August 18, 1866 Monticello Township, Johnson County, Kansas, U.S.
- Died: March 26, 1933 (aged 66) Pocatello, Idaho, U.S.
- Party: Republican
- Children: Vera Brady Shipman
- Relatives: James H. Brady (brother)
- Education: Baker University
- Occupation: Politician, lawyer, newspaper editor

John Leeford Brady (August 18, 1866 – March 26, 1933) was an American lawyer, politician, and newspaper editor.

== Biography ==
Brady was born in Monticello Township, Johnson County, Kansas. He went to public school and Baker University. Brady was admitted to the Kansas bar in 1896. He served as editor of the Lawrence Daily Journal in Lawrence, Kansas. Brady was a Republican. He served in the Kansas House of Representatives in 1905–1906 and in the Kansas Senate from 1909 to 1913. He then moved to Salina, Kansas, and was the editor of the Salina Daily Union newspaper. He moved to Salem, Oregon, in 1924 and was the editor of the Salem Statesman newspaper. Brady moved to Pocatello, Idaho, and served as editor of the Idaho State Journal. In 1927, he moved to Blackfoot, Idaho, and served as the editor of the Blackfoot Daily Bulletin. Brady died at a hospital in Pocatello, Idaho, from heart disease. His daughter was Vera Brady Shipman, who was a composer, writer, and journalist. His brother was James H. Brady, who served as the governor of Idaho and as the United States Senator from Idaho.
