= Margaret Brady =

Margaret Brady may refer to:

- Margaret Brady (politician) (1857–1932), Irish politician
- Margaret Anne Brady, fictional character
