= Anthony Brady =

Anthony Brady may refer to:

- Anton Brady (born 1994), Scottish footballer
- Anthony N. Brady (1841–1913), American businessman
