= Greg Brady =

Greg Brady may refer to:

- Greg Brady (broadcaster) (born 1971), Canadian broadcaster
- Greg Brady (Brady Bunch), a character from The Brady Bunch
