= Bill Brady =

Bill Brady may refer to:

- Bill Brady (baseball) (1889–1956), Major League Baseball player
- Bill Brady (journalist) (1932–2025), Canadian print and radio journalist
- Bill Brady (politician) (born 1961), Republican state senator and former candidate for governor
- Dollar Bill (real name Bill Brady), a character in the Watchmen series

== See also ==
- William Brady (disambiguation)
- Brady Bill
