= Angela Brady =

Irish-British architect

- Born: Dublin, Ireland
- Education: Dublin Institute of Technology
- Occupation: Architect
- Known for: President of the RIBA
- Spouse: Robin Mallalieu

Angela Brady OBE PPRIBA is an Irish-born Irish/British architect and has lived in London for over 25 years. In 2011 she was elected president of the UK's Royal Institute of British Architects (RIBA) for a two-year term. She is a past chairperson of the Royal Institute of the Architects of Ireland (RIAI) London Forum.

== Life and career ==
Brady was born in Dublin and educated at Technological University Dublin's School of Architecture and received a post-graduate scholarship at Kunstakademiet in Copenhagen. This was followed by a short period working with Arthur Erickson in Toronto, Canada.

She qualified as an architect in 1984 and briefly worked for GMW Architects, Lewis & Hickey Architects and Shepheard Epstein Hunter Architects. In 1987 she co-founded Brady Mallalieu Architects with Robin Mallalieu in London.

She is a TV personality in Ireland and the UK, co writing and co presenting with Dr Sandra O'Connell "Designing Ireland" a 6 part landmark TV series broadcast on RTÉ 1, "Building the Dream" on ITV and "The Home Show" a 6 part series on Channel 4. "Showing the public what architects do is a great opportunity, and TV is the best medium for doing that", she has explained. Designing Ireland showing on Amazon Prime TV 2019/2020.

Brady has been active in the RIBA and RIAI for many years. In 2000 she was a founder of the RIBA 'Architects for Change' group, which campaigns for greater involvement in architecture by women and ethnic minorities. She was elected president of RIBA in 2011, the first non British person and the second woman to hold the position. As Brady has said, "One of the reasons I got voted in was because I was the only person pushing diversity in our profession. We're only 18% women and I'd love it if we could push it to 40%". Brady immediately set up a task force to report on how the government could improve the way it awards public sector contracts. She also planned to improve engagement with politicians and to make the RIBA headquarters a 'cooler' place, including plans to open a new office in East London.

National Life Stories conducted an oral history interview (C467/107) with Angela Brady in 2013–14 for its Architects Lives' collection held by the British Library.

Brady's architectural firm was involved in the design for the new School of Architecture and Interior Design, in London. The award-winning design also incorporates a 2-storey Victorian warehouse to the rear and a new building at the front. The building was conceived as 'raw' construction with all materials left in their natural state.

Brady Mallalieu was involved in the refurbishing of the Sacred Heart Church, Kilburn, London, initially constructed in 1878 by Edward Welby Pugin. Brady was involved in creating a new lighting scheme that removed the visual clutter associated with modern lighting technologies. Suspended light fittings with the main body of the church were designed as contemporary 'coronas' a lighting arrangement typical in a Victorian church. Additionally, extensive repairs to the exterior of the church, including specialist repairs to stop tracery and leaded glass, were performed.

Brady's architectural firm is also well known for creating The Barra Park Open Air Theatre in Hayes London. This theatre is an open-air venue for music, theatre and dance. The local community raised the money for the new structure and the building materials were carefully chosen to be robust and durable, but also complementing the natural park setting. The structure has a sculpture quality that allows it to play an important role in the community, even during the seasons where performances can not be completed.

In 2004, Brady's firm finished construction on the St. Catherine's Foyer and Sports Centre in Dublin Ireland. This Foyer was Ireland's first Foyer centre and consists of a 48-bed Foyer housing and training project. In 2009, Brady's architectural firm completed Phoenix Heights in London. Located on Mastmaker Road, this high density project consists of 199 mixed tenure homes with integral community areas. Community space played an important role in the design of the building and the structure has a rooftop sports pitch.
BMA's Most recent building "Brickworks" Community Centre and housing project for Islington Council won RIAI Award 2019.

== Awards ==
In 2012, Brady was awarded the Women of Outstanding Achievement Award For Leadership and Inspiration. She was awarded the Order of the British Empire in 2015 and in 2017 she was awarded the Irish President's Distinguished Services Award for architecture design.

== Bibliography ==
- Dublin: Guide to Recent Architecture. Batsford. 2003. ISBN 0-7134-8811-5.

"The China Papers" Published in China 2011 "The British Papers" - RIBA Publications 2014. "The Cork Papers - sustainable city in the making" June 2018, Published by Cork Co Council. Available free on line.
