= Terry Brady (footballer) =

Australian rules footballer

Personal information
- Full name: Terry Brady
- Born: June 3, 1944 (age 82)
- Original team: Ararat
- Height: 188 cm (6 ft 2 in)
- Weight: 80 kg (176 lb)

Playing career^{1}
Years	Club	Games (Goals)
1965	Fitzroy	1 (1)
- ^{1} Playing statistics correct to the end of 1965.

Terry Brady (born 3 June 1944) is a former Australian rules footballer who played with Fitzroy in the Victorian Football League (VFL).
