= Nicholas Brady =

Nicholas or Nick Brady may refer to:

- Nicholas Brady (poet) (1659–1726), Irish divine and poet
- Nicholas Frederic Brady (1878–1930), American businessman and philanthropist
- Nicholas F. Brady (born 1930), American banker and Secretary of the Treasury
- Nicholas Brady (died 2012), victim in the Byron David Smith killings
