= Henry Brady =

Henry Brady may refer to:

- Henry Bowman Brady (1835–1891), British micropalaeontologist
- Henry E. Brady, American political scientist
