= Monticello Township, Kansas =

Former township in Kansas, US

Coordinates: 38°58′42″N 94°51′45″W

Monticello Township is a former township in northwest Johnson County, Kansas. It is now merged with Lenexa and Shawnee, Kansas.

== History ==
In 1858 Monticello elected 21-year-old James Butler Hickok (better known as Wild Bill Hickok) as town constable. At one time Monticello had a stage shop, stores, saloons, blacksmith, doctor, hotel, general store, school house, churches, and about 15 dwellings. The 1910 population was about 63. The town was bypassed by the Kansas Midland Railroad (Atchison, Topeka and Santa Fe), which instead passed Olathe which caused the town to lose its county seat status. In 1987, Shawnee annexed land south of 55th to 83rd/79th west to the Kansas River, increasing the city size to 42 square miles (110 km^{2}).

Before its annexation, Monticello Township was the natural crossroads for fur trading and later westward emigration by wagon.

== See also ==
- Oregon Trail
- California Trail
- Harold "Jug" McSpaden - PGA Tour player and golf course architect
- National Agricultural Center and Hall of Fame north along K-7 Corridor

== Notable residents ==
- Manuel Lisa - Fur trader
- Wild Bill Hickok - Lawman
- Jug McSpaden - Professional golfer
- William S. Williams - Mountain man
