= Hugh Brady =

Hugh Brady may refer to:

- Hugh Brady (academic) (born 1959), Irish medic, academic and university president and vice-chancellor
- Hugh Brady (bishop) (died 1585), Bishop of Meath
- Hugh Brady (general) (1768–1851), American general from Pennsylvania
