= Emily Brady =

Scottish analytic philosopher

Emily Brady is an analytic philosopher who specializes in aesthetics, environmental philosophy and history of eighteenth-century philosophy. She is currently a professor of philosophy at Texas A&M University. From 2018 to 2022, she was also Director of the Glasscock Center for Humanities Research, where she held the inaugural Susanne M. and Melbern G. Glasscock Director's Chair. She is best known for her work on the sublime and on environmental philosophy.

== Biography ==
Brady earned her PhD in Philosophy at the University of Glasgow in 1992. Until 2018, she was Professor of Environment and Philosophy in the Institute of Geography and the Lived Environment at the University of Edinburgh. From 1994 to 2004 she was a Lecturer, then a Senior Lecturer in Philosophy at Lancaster University.

== Select publications ==
- The Sublime in Modern Philosophy, Cambridge University Press, 2013
- Aesthetics of the Natural Environment, Edinburgh University Press, 2003
- Aesthetic Concepts: Essays After Sibley (co-edited with Jerrold Levinson), Oxford University Press, 2001
- Environment and Philosophy (with Vernon Pratt and Jane Howarth), Routledge, 2000
