= Siobhan Brady =

Canadian molecular biologist

Siobhan Mary Brady
- Education: University of Toronto
- Scientific career
- Workplaces: University of California, Davis
- Thesis: Modulators of abscisic acid insensitive3 (ABI3) : a genetic and bioinformatic approach (2006)

Siobhan Mary Brady is a Canadian molecular biologist who is a professor of Plant Biology at the University of California, Davis. Her research considers how plant roots experience their surrounding environment, with a focus on understanding the impact of climate change. Brady was elected Fellow of the American Association for the Advancement of Science in 2023.

== Early life and education ==
Brady grew up in Ontario. She has said that she was surrounded with plants from a young age. Her high school English teacher and chemistry teacher encouraged her to pursue her curiosity. She had originally intended to creative writing, but settled on science, and became interested in plant biology. She studied molecular biology at the University of Toronto. She remained there for her doctoral research, and earned her doctorate in 2005. She studied how hormonal cues are integrated in root initiation. She used suppressor screens and mutant analysis to investigate genetic relationships. Her doctoral research considered the abscisic acid insensitive3 (ABI3) gene. She moved to Duke University as a postdoctoral researcher, where she studied gene expression patterns using microarrays of cells. She studied the COBRA gene family. She was named as one of the most outstanding postdoctoral researchers at Duke University.

== Research and career ==
In 2009, Brady joined the University of California, Davis as an assistant professor. Her research has focussed on roots – specifically the Arabidopsis root – as a model for plant development.

== Awards and honours ==
- 2009 American Society of Plant Biologists Early Career Award
- 2016 Howard Hughes Medical Institute Scholar
- 2023 Elected Fellow of the American Society of Plant Biologists
- 2023 Elected Fellow of American Association for the Advancement of Science

== Selected publications ==
- Siobhan M Brady; David A Orlando; Ji-Young Lee; et al. (1 November 2007). "A high-resolution root spatiotemporal map reveals dominant expression patterns". Science. 318 (5851): 801–806. doi:10.1126/science.1146265. ISSN 0036-8075. PMID 17975066. Wikidata Q50659214.
- Kiana Toufighi; Siobhan M Brady; Ryan Austin; Eugene Ly; Nicholas J Provart (1 July 2005). "The Botany Array Resource: e-Northerns, Expression Angling, and promoter analyses". The Plant Journal. 43 (1): 153–163. doi:10.1111/j.1365-313x.2005.02437.x. ISSN 0960-7412. PMID 15960624. Wikidata Q81859888.
- José R Dinneny; Terri A Long; Jean Y Wang; et al. (24 April 2008). "Cell identity mediates the response of Arabidopsis roots to abiotic stress". Science. 320 (5878): 942–945. doi:10.1126/science.1153795. ISSN 0036-8075. PMID 18436742. Wikidata Q46626793.
