= 2nd Carabinier Regiment (France) =

The 2nd Carabinier Regiment (French: 2ème Régiment des Carabinier) was a French cavalry regiment.

== The Napoleonic Wars ==
=== War of the fourth Coalition ===
The regiment took part in the Battle of Jena–Auerstedt in Joachim Murat's Reserve Cavalry.
