= Edward Brady =

Edward Brady may refer to:

- Edward Thomas Brady (born 1943), American judge
- Ed Brady (American football) (born 1962), American football player

== See also ==
- Ed Brady (actor) (Edwin Brady, 1889–1942), American film actor
