= Dan Brady =

Dan Brady may refer to:

- Dan Brady (ice hockey) (born 1950), American ice hockey goaltender
- Dan Brady (Illinois politician) (born 1961), member of the Illinois House of Representatives
- Dan Brady (Ohio politician), American politician from Ohio
