= Brookner Brady =

American modern pentathlete

Brookner West Brady
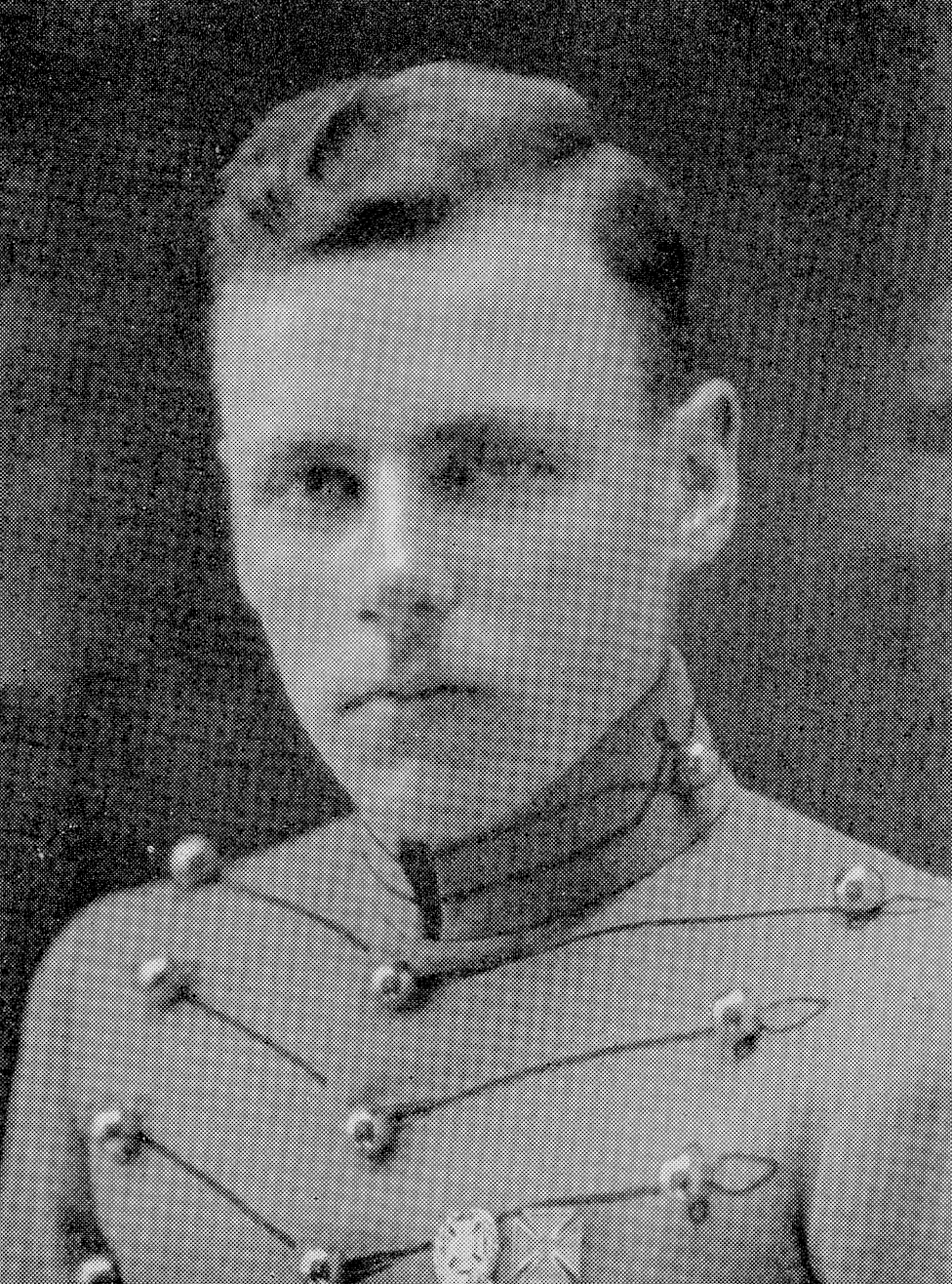
- At West Point in 1926

Personal information
- Born: January 1, 1905 Washington, D.C., United States
- Died: March 22, 1977 (aged 72) San Francisco, California, United States
- Military career
- Education: United States Military Academy (1926)
- Branch: United States Army
- Rank: Colonel
- Awards: Bronze Star Medal; Purple Heart; Combat Infantryman Badge; Croix de Guerre 1939–1945

Sport
- Country: United States
- Sport: Modern pentathlon

Brookner West Brady (January 1, 1905 – March 22, 1977) was an American modern pentathlete and United States Army colonel.

== Career ==
Brady graduated from the United States Military Academy in 1926.

In 1932, Brady competed as a modern pentathlete at the Summer Olympics.

During World War II, he took part in landing invasions at Casablanca and Sicily. He was injured during the Sicilian campaign and later commanded an infantry regiment in Italy. He was awarded a Bronze Star Medal, Purple Heart, Combat Infantryman Badge, and a Croix de Guerre 1939–1945 with palm.

Following World War II, he served as the American military attaché in Bulgaria during 1949. He then served in the same position in Ankara in 1950 and 1951. After retiring from the military, he taught a variety of subjects at Mission High School in San Francisco, and photography at San Francisco City College.

He died in San Francisco on March 22, 1977, and was buried at San Francisco National Cemetery.

== Personal life ==
Brady's wife Marjorie was Sausalito city councillor from 1958 to 1962. They had a son named Brookner W. Brady Jr.
