= Christopher Brady =

Chris or Christopher Brady may refer to:

- Christopher Brady, American medalist in swimming for United States at the 2011 Pan American Games
- Chris Brady (basketball) (born 1995), Puerto Rican-American center
- Chris Brady (soccer) (born 2004), American goalkeeper

== See also ==
- Chris Brody (disambiguation)
