= Terence Brady =

Terence Brady may refer to:

- Terence Brady (bishop) (born 1947), auxiliary bishop of the Roman Catholic Archdiocese of Sydney
- Terence Brady (writer) (1939–2016), Irish writer
