= Kathleen T. Brady =

American psychiatrist

Kathleen Brady
- Born: October 11, 1952 (age 74)
- Spouse: R. B. Lydiard
- Relatives: Joseph V. Brady (father)

Academic background
- Education: BA, psychology and biology, 1976, Fordham University; PhD, 1981, Virginia Commonwealth University; MD, Medical University of South Carolina
- Thesis: Comparison of the behavioral pharmacology of phencyclidine to related compounds (1981)

Kathleen T. Brady (born October 11, 1952) is an American psychiatrist.

== Early life and education ==
Brady was born on October 11, 1952 to neuroscientist Joseph V. Brady. She would join her father in his laboratory and earned her first author credit in the fourth grade with a paper in the Journal of the Experimental Analysis of Behavior.

Following high school, Brady enrolled at Fordham University for her bachelor's degree in psychology and biology. She met her future husband R.B. Lydiard at the VCU School of Medicine and followed him to the Medical University of South Carolina (MUSC) for her medical degree.

== Career ==
Following medical school and a psychiatry residency, Brady completed a fellowship in addiction psychiatry before joining the Medical University of South Carolina (MUSC) faculty as an assistant professor. In this role, she examined gender differences in psychiatric disorders among 100 treatment-seeking cocaine and alcohol abusers. In 2010, Brady was promoted to Distinguished University Professor at MUSC for her addiction research and studies on substance abuse and mental health disorders. Following her promotion, Brady received funding to examine relationships among gender, stress, and craving in cocaine and nicotine use in order to develop potential medications to prevent stress-based cocaine relapse and promote smoking cessation.

During the summer of 2016, Brady was named the Vice President for Research at the MUSC as a result of her "passion for advancing new knowledge and scientific discoveries." Following this, she received the Peggy Schachte Research Mentor Award for her "strong record of mentoring faculty, postdoctoral fellows, and doctoral students in obtaining extramural awards."
