= Justice Brady =

Justice Brady may refer to:

- Edward Thomas Brady (fl. 1960s–2010s), associate justice of the North Carolina Supreme Court
- Thomas Pickens Brady (1903–1973), associate justice of the Mississippi Supreme Court

== See also ==
- Judge Brady (disambiguation)
