= Gerry Brady (sport shooter) =

Irish sports shooter

Personal information
- Born: Patrick Gerard Brady; 24 October 1925 Dublin, Ireland
- Died: 30 December 2012 (aged 87)

Sport
- Sport: Sports shooting

Patrick Gerard Brady (24 October 1925 – 30 December 2012) was an Irish sports shooter. He competed at the 1968 Summer Olympics and the 1972 Summer Olympics.
