= Peter Brady =

Peter or Pete Brady may refer to:

== People ==
- Peter Brady (footballer) (1875–1949), Australian rules footballer for St Kilda
- Peter Brady (politician) (1829–?), American politician
- Ruairí Ó Brádaigh (1932–2013), Irish republican, born Peter Brady
- Peter J. Brady (born 1962), American labor leader and member of the Vermont House of Representatives
- Peter Rainsford Brady (1825–1902), American military officer, surveyor and politician
- Peter Brady, Irish politician defeated by Derek Keating
- Peter Brady, Canadian ice hockey player of the Powell River Kings
- Pete Brady, Canadian writer for Cannabis Culture
- Pete Brady (presenter) (born 1941), Canadian radio and television presenter

== Characters ==
- Peter Brady (The Brady Bunch)
- Dr. Peter Brady, a The Invisible Man character
- Pete Brady, a Silver Street character
