= Mary Brady =

Civil War nurse 1821–1864

Mary Brady (1821-1864) was a nurse in the American Civil War. She was the co-founder and president of the Ladies Association for Soldiers Relief.

== Early life and marriage ==
Mary was born in Ireland in 1821. Little else is known about her life in Ireland.

Mary married an English attorney, Edward Brady, in Manchester England in 1846. The couple went on to have five children.

Brady and her husband immigrated to the United States in 1849. Her husband became a prominent Philadelphia attorney.

== Nursing ==
Brady volunteered at Satterlee Hospital in West Philadelphia, a facility that cared for up to 3,000 soldiers.

Brady co-founded Ladies Association for Soldiers Relief, an organization that provided support, care, and supplies for soldiers and hospitals. Brady first visited and distributed supplies to Philadelphia hospitals. She later expanded to other hospitals. She was the first woman to visit Alexandria, Virginia hospitals.

Brady also nursed soldiers on the front lines. She used a four-mule wagon for transportation and stopped where she saw red flags. Flags indicated the location of soldiers in need.

She ultimately visited about 40 hospitals and is said to have been in contact with up to 30,000 patients in two years.

Her travels took a toll on her health. After her fifth trip to the front lines, she arrived home weak.

She was diagnosed with a weak heart and died months later. Hundreds of soldiers attended her funeral.
