= Brendan Brady (footballer) =

Australian rules footballer

Personal information
- Full name: Brendan Norman Brady
- Born: 3 February 1917; Tatura, Victoria
- Died: 17 January 2010 (aged 92); Doncaster, Victoria
- Original team: Doncaster
- Height: 180 cm (5 ft 11 in)
- Weight: 80 kg (176 lb)

Playing career^{1}
| Years | Club | Games (Goals) |
| 1940–41 | Hawthorn | 8 (7) |
- ^{1} Playing statistics correct to the end of 1941.

Brendan Norman Brady (3 February 1917 – 17 January 2010) was an Australian rules footballer who played with Hawthorn in the Victorian Football League (VFL).

Brady was an follower from Doncaster who was recruited before the start of the 1940 season. Brady managed eight senior games over two seasons with the "Mayblooms". He enlisted in the army to fight at the end of the 1940 season and couldn't get time off to continue with his football.

== Death ==
Brady died on 17 January 2010, at the age of 92.
