= Charles Brady =

Charles Brady may refer to:

- Charles Brady (artist) (1926–1997), American-born painter in Ireland
- Charles E. Brady Jr. (1951–2006), American physician and NASA astronaut
- Charles N. Brady (1849–1938), American businessman and innovator in the glass industry
