= John Joseph Brady =

American writer and professor (born 1942)

John Joseph Brady (born 1942) lives in Newburyport, Massachusetts. He is a visiting professor who teaches news writing and editing, as well as graphics, at the E.W. Scripps School of Journalism at Ohio University in Athens, Ohio.

== Career ==
Brady served as editor-in-chief of Writer's Digest and Boston magazine. He was founding editor of The Artist's Magazine and M:The Magazine for Montessori Families. He has been teaching at universities and in various fora since the early 1990s, including a stint in 1996 as Hearst Visiting professor at the Missouri School of Journalism.

== Publications ==
External videos
- Booknotes interview with Brady on Bad Boy, February 9, 1997, C-SPAN

Brady is the author of Bad Boy: The Life and Politics of Lee Atwater. He also wrote The Craft of the Screenwriter (Simon & Schuster, 1981), as well as two books for journalists – The Craft of Interviewing (Random House Vintage, 1976) and The Interviewer's Handbook (The Writer Books, 2004). He publishes a monthly column on magazine editing for Folio magazine. His book Frank & Ava: In Love and War (October, 2015) retells the story of the romance between Frank Sinatra and Ava Gardner.

=== Works ===
- The Craft of Interviewing (1976) ISBN 978-0394724690
- The Craft of the Screenwriter (1981) ISBN 978-0671252304
- Bad Boy: The Life and Politics of Lee Atwater (1996) ISBN 978-0201627336
- The Interviewer's Handbook (2004) ISBN 0871162059
- Frank & Ava: In Love and War (2015) ISBN 978-1250070913
