= Maurice V. Brady =

American politician

Member of the New Jersey General Assembly from the Hudson district
- In office January 8, 1952 – January 9, 1968
- Preceded by: Multi-member district
- Succeeded by: Multi-member district

Personal details
- Born: January 18, 1904 Bayonne, New Jersey
- Died: November 5, 1991 (aged 87) Holmdel Township, New Jersey
- Party: Democratic

Maurice V. Brady (January 18, 1904 – November 5, 1991) was an American politician who served in the New Jersey General Assembly from the Hudson district from 1952 to 1968. He served as Speaker of the New Jersey General Assembly in 1960 and 1966.
