= Philip Brady =

Philip Brady or Phillip Brady may refer to:

- Philip Brady (broadcaster) (1939–2025), Australian media personality
- Phil Brady (Gaelic footballer) (died 1980), Gaelic footballer
- Phil Brady (gridiron football) (1943 1986), American professional football player
- Philip Brady (politician) (1898–1995), Irish Fianna Fáil politician
- Phillip D. Brady (born 1951), White House staff
