= Kevin Brady (disambiguation) =

Kevin Brady (born 1955) is an American politician.

Kevin Brady may also refer to:

- Kevin Brady (footballer) (born 1962), Irish former footballer
- Kevin Brady (public servant) (born 1947), New Zealand public servant
- Kevin Brady (musician) (born 1974), Irish jazz drummer and composer
- Kevin Brady (hurler) (born 1983), Irish hurler
