= Patrick Brady =

Patrick Brady may refer to:

- Patrick H. Brady (Navy) (born 1959), U.S. Navy Rear Admiral, submarine commander
- Patrick Henry Brady (born 1936), U.S. Army Major General and Medal of Honor recipient
- P. J. Brady (1868–1943), Irish nationalist MP in the United Kingdom Parliament for Dublin St Stephen's Green
- Patrick Jennings Brady (born 1967), American artist
- Patrick Brady (Physicist), Irish gravitational-wave astronomer and physicist
