= Arthur Brady (footballer) =

Scottish footballer

Personal information
- Full name: Arthur Brady
- Place of birth: Scotland
- Position: Winger

Senior career*
Years	Team	Apps	(Gls)
	Broxburn	?	(?)
1893–1894	Burnley	24	(9)
- * Club domestic league appearances and goals

Arthur Brady was a Scottish professional footballer who played as a defender for Burnley during the 1890s.
