= Joan Brady (Christian novelist) =

American best-selling writer since 1995

- Born: 1950 (age 75–76); US
- Education: William Paterson University
- Occupations: Nurse, novelist
- Writing career
- Pen name: Joan Brady
- Language: English
- Period: 1995–present
- Notable work: God on a Harley
- Website: www.joanbradybooks.com

Joan Brady (born 1950) is an American best-selling writer since 1995.

== Biography ==
Joan Brady grew up in New Jersey, one of seven children; she had four brothers and two sisters. In 1972 she graduated with a Bachelor of Science degree in Nursing from William Paterson University. She worked during twenty-two years as a registered nurse, before published her best-selling debut novel, God on a Harley.

She lives in San Diego, California.

== Bibliography ==
=== God on a Harley Series ===
1. God on a Harley (1995)
2. Joyride (2003)

=== Single novels ===
- Heaven in High Gear (1997)

Angel on a Harley

=== Non-fiction ===
- I Don't Need a Baby to Be Who I Am: Thoughts And Affirmations On a Fulfilling Life (1998)
