= Stumpy Brady =

American jazz musician (1910–1998)

- Birth name: Floyd Maurice Brady
- Born: August 4, 1910; Brownsville, Pennsylvania, US
- Died: February 11, 1998 (aged 87)
- Genres: Jazz
- Occupation: Musician
- Instrument: Trombone

Floyd Maurice "Stumpy" Brady (August 4, 1910 – February 11, 1998) was an American jazz trombonist.

Brady performed and recorded with Zack Whyte’s Chocolate Beau Brummels (1928–29) before touring with Al Sears. He played with Andy Kirk in New York (1930–34), also recording for Blanche Calloway in 1931), returning briefly to Whyte’s band in 1933.

He replaced Ed Cuffee in McKinney’s Cotton Pickers, and then performed and recorded with Claude Hopkins (1936–8) and Teddy Wilson (1939–40).

As a member of the Lucky Millinder orchestra, Brady played a solo while accompanying Sister Rosetta Tharpe in the soundie Lonesome Road (1941).

Other musicians and bandleaders he worked with include Al Sears and Count Basie, Joe Guy (touring with Billie Holiday in 1945), Jay McShann, Fletcher Henderson, Roy Eldridge, and Cat Anderson.

After a period of inactivity in the 1950s, Brady resumed playing in the 1960s with Slide Hampton’s band, Luckey Roberts’s orchestra, and Edgar Battle’s big band.
