= Campbell Brady =

Australian rules footballer (1891–1947)

Personal information
- Full name: Henry Campbell Brady
- Born: 5 October 1891; East Melbourne, Victoria
- Died: 27 June 1947 (aged 55); Randwick, New South Wales
- Original team: Cressy / South Ballarat

Playing career^{1}
Years	Club	Games (Goals)
1913	Melbourne	9 (12)
- ^{1} Playing statistics correct to the end of 1913.

Henry Campbell Brady (5 October 1891 – 27 June 1947) was an Australian rules footballer who played with Melbourne in the Victorian Football League (VFL).
