= Ó Brádaigh =

Ó Brádaigh is an Irish surname, which means a 'descendant of Brádach'. Brádach is an old Irish nickname which is believed be a short form of Brághadach, meaning "large-chested". An alternative meaning is "spirited".

Brady is the anglicised version of Ó Brádaigh and is often used as a given name in the United States. The surname Ó Brádaigh may refer to:

- Ruairí Ó Brádaigh (1932–2013), Irish politician
- Seán Ó Brádaigh (born 1937), Irish political activist
