= George Brady =

George Brady may refer to:

- George Brady (Holocaust survivor) (1928–2019), Czech-born Canadian Holocaust survivor
- George F. Brady (1867–1903), United States Navy sailor and Medal of Honor recipient
- George K. Brady (1838–1899), United States Army officer
- George Stewardson Brady (1832–1921), British natural historian
