= Gordon L. Brady =

American economist

Gordon L. Brady is an American Economist, Professor and Writer and resides in Vienna, Virginia.

Gordon Brady received his B.A. from the University of North Carolina at Chapel Hill in 1967, a M.A. in economics from the University of North Carolina at Chapel Hill in 1973, a Ph.D. in economics from the Virginia Polytechnic Institute and State University in 1976 and Master of Studies in Law from Yale Law School . He has published more than 70 papers and 3 books, including Government: Whose Obedient Servant? A Primer on Public Choice. With Arthur Seldon and Gordon Tullock (2000), On the Trail of Homo Economicus: Essays by Gordon Tullock Edited with Robert Tollison (1994) and Duncan Black: Selected Works of the Unpublished Legacy Edited with Gordon Tullock (1995).

== Selected publications ==
=== Books ===
- Government: Whose Obedient Servant? A Primer on Public Choice. With A. Seldon and G. Tullock. London: Institute of Economic Affairs, 2000. Reprinted as Government Failure: A Primer in Public Choice. Washington, DC, 2002.
- On the Trail of Homo Economicus: Essays by Gordon Tullock. Edited with R. Tollison. Fairfax, VA: George Mason University Press,1994.
- Duncan Black: Selected Works of the Unpublished Legacy. Edited with G. Tullock. Dordrecht: Kluwer Academic Press,1995.
- Formal Contributions to the Theory of Public Choice: The Unpublished Works of Duncan Black. Edited with G. Tullock. Dordrecht: Kluwer Academic Press, 1996.

=== Papers ===
- "A panel data analysis of the fiscal sustainability of G-7 countries", With C. Magazzino, F., Forte. The Journal of Economic Asymmetries, 20, 2019. DOI: 10.1016/j.jeca.2019.e00127.
- "Government expenditures and revenues in Italy in a long-run perspective", With C. Magazzino, Journal of Quantitative Economics, 17, 2, 361–375, 2019. DOI: 10.1007/s40953-019-00157-z.
- "The sustainability of Italian fiscal policy: myth or reality?", With C. Magazzino, Economic Research-Ekonomska Istraživanja, 32, 1, 772–796, 2019. DOI: 10.1080/1331677X.2019.1583585.
- "Sustainability and co-movement of Government Debt in EMU Countries: A Panel Data Analysis", With C. Magazzino, Southern Economic Journal, 85, 1, 189–202, 2018. DOI: 10.1002/soej.12269.
- "Fiscal sustainability in the EU", With C. Magazzino, Atlantic Economic Journal, 46, 3, 297–311, 2018. DOI: 10.1007/s11293-018-9588-4.
- "Government Debt in EMU Countries", With C. Magazzino, The Journal of Economic Asymmetries, 18, November, 2018. DOI: 10.1016/j.jeca.2018.e00096.
- "The relationship among renewable energy, economic growth, labor and capital formation in Italy", With C. Magazzino, Rivista di Studi sulla Sostenibilità, 1, 35–48, 2018. DOI: 10.3280/RISS2018-001005.
- "Sustainability of Italian Budgetary Policies: A Time Series Analysis (1862-2013)", With C. Magazzino, European Journal of Government and Economics, 6, 2, 2017.
- "The Sustainability of Italian Public Debt and Deficit", With C. Magazzino, International Advances in Economic Research, 23, 1, 9-20, 2017. DOI: 10.1007/s11294-016-9623-7.
- "The Chicago roots of the Virginia School of Political Economy." The Elgar Companion to the Chicago School of Economics, edited by Ross B. Emmett (Edward Elgar, 2007).
- "Valuing Tullock's Rejects: The Case of Rent Seeking." Atlantic Economic Journal. (2005).
- Duncan Black and Ronald Coase: A Lifelong Friendship Rooted in Economics. Journal of Public Finance and Public Choice. (22: 53–72) 2004.
- "Internet Governance: An Economic Analysis." Economic Affairs. May 2003.
- "Valuing Tullock's Rejects." Economic Affairs. December 2002.
- "International Governance of the Internet: An Example of Common Property Resource Management." E-Government. Derek C. Jones (ed). Dordrecht, Holland: Academic Press. 2003.
- "Internet Governance: A Rent-Seeking Perspective." With Alden Abbott. Journal of Private Enterprise. Nov. 2000.
- "The Internet, Economic Growth and Governance." Economic Affairs. March 2000. p. 13-20.
- "Gordon Tullock: His Development as an Unconventional Economist, 1947-1962." In Public Choice Essays in Honor of a Maverick Scholar: Gordon Tullock. Boston: Kluwer Academic Press, 2000.
- "Telecommunications Policy: A Rent-Seeking Analysis," With Alden F. Abbott. European Journal of Law and Economics, Vol. 8, No. 2, 1998.
- "Arnold Plant: A Historical Sketch." Journal of Private Enterprise, 1997.
- "Dezoning the Spectrum: Opportunities for Rent Seeking in Telecommunications." With Alden F. Abbott. Journal of Private Enterprise, 1998.
