= Attorney General Brady =

Attorney General Brady may refer to:

- M. Jane Brady (born 1951), Attorney General of Delaware
- Maziere Brady (1796–1871), Attorney General of Ireland
- Rory Brady (1957–2010), Attorney General of Ireland

== See also ==
- General Brady (disambiguation)
