= Donita Brady =

Cancer biologist

Donita C. Brady
- Education: Radford University - Chemistry, B.S. University of North Carolina at Chapel Hill, PhD
- Scientific career
- Fields: Cancer Biology
- Workplaces: Duke University School of Medicine, Postdoctoral Researcher with Christopher Counter, 2008-2013 Duke University School of Medicine, Research Associate Senior with Christopher Counter, 2013-2015
- Thesis: The transforming Rho family GTPase, Wrch-1, regulates epithelial cell morphogenesis through modulating cell junctions and actin cytoskeletal dynamics (May 2008)
- Doctoral advisor: Adrienne D. Cox
- Website: https://www.med.upenn.edu/bradylab/

Donita C. Brady is a cancer biologist and the Presidential Associate Professor of Cancer Biology at the Perelman School of Medicine at the University of Pennsylvania. Her research examines how cells communicate through kinases and nutrient homeostasis, and in particular, the central role of copper and other metals in these interactions.

== Early life and education ==
Brady grew up near Virginia Beach and was inspired to purse Chemistry as a result of her AP Chemistry teacher. Brady studied chemistry at Radford University where she graduated magna cum laude.

== Career ==
Brady completed a PhD in pharmacology in 2008 at the University of North Carolina, Chapel Hill in the laboratory of Adrienne D. Cox. As a graduate student, Brady studied how cancer cells exploit normal cellular functions to alter their shape. After graduation, Brady became a postdoctoral fellow (2008 - 2013) and senior research associate (2013 - 2015) in the laboratory of Christopher Counter at Duke University School of Medicine. In 2015, she joined the Department of Cancer Biology in the Perelman School of Medicine at the University of Pennsylvania as an assistant professor. In 2016, Brady was recognized as one of 22 Pew Scholars in Biomedical Sciences by The Pew Charitable Trusts. In 2019, Brady was awarded a grant through the Stuart Scott Memorial Cancer Research Fund to continue her work in PDAC (pancreatic ductal adenocarcinoma) research.

=== Research interests ===
Brady research focuses on how cells communicate through kinases and nutrient homeostasis, and the central role of metals such as copper in healthy cell physiology and cancer. She discovered that kinases require copper for their ability to function. Brady also showed that by inhibiting a protein called CTR1, which is responsible for importing copper into cells, tumor growth could be slowed in a mouse model.

=== Awards and honors ===
Brady has received several honors and awards for her research, including:

- James Lewis Howe Award for Outstanding Achievement in Chemistry - American Chemical Society (2003)
- AACR Annual Meeting Minority Scholar in Cancer Research Award (2013 and 2014)
- CRCHD CURE scholar (2014)
- Pew Scholar in the biomedical sciences (2016)
- JBC/Herb Tabor Young Investigator Award (2016)
- William Guy Forbeck Research Foundation Scholar (2017)
- Linda Pechenik Montague Investigator Award (2018)
- ASBMB Ruth Kirschstein Award for Maximizing Access in Science (2026)

=== Selected publications ===
- Brady, Donita C., et al. "Copper is required for oncogenic BRAF signalling and tumorigenesis." Nature 509.7501 (2014): 492–496.
- Brady, Donita C., et al. "Copper chelation inhibits BRAFV600E-driven melanomagenesis and counters resistance to BRAFV600E and MEK1/2 inhibitors." Cancer research 77.22 (2017): 6240–6252.
- Sadeghi, Rochelle Shirin. "Wnt5a Signaling Induced Phosphorylation Increases Acyl Protein Thioesterase Activity And Promotes Melanoma Metastatic Behavior." (2018).
- Kim, Ye-Jin, et al. "Copper chaperone ATOX1 is required for MAPK signaling and growth in BRAF mutation-positive melanoma." Metallomics 11.8 (2019): 1430–1440.
- Kim, Ye-Jin, et al. "Inhibition of BCL2 family members increases the efficacy of copper chelation in BRAFV600E-driven melanoma." Cancer Research 80.7 (2020): 1387–1400.
- Tsang, Tiffany, et al. "Copper is an essential regulator of the autophagic kinases ULK1/2 to drive lung adenocarcinoma." Nature Cell Biology 22.4 (2020): 412–424.

== Personal life ==
At Radford University, Brady played Division I softball.
