= Michael Brady =

Michael Brady may refer to:

- Michael Brady (baseball) (born 1987), American baseball player
- Michael Brady (philosopher) (born 1965), British philosopher
- Michael Brady (politician) (born 1962), American state legislator
- Michael Brady (soccer) (born 1964), English-born American soccer player and coach
- Mike Brady (golfer) (1887–1972), American golfer
- Mike Brady (musician) (born 1948), Australian musician
- Mickey Brady (born 1950), Sinn Féin politician in Northern Ireland
- Sir Michael Brady (biomedical engineer) (born 1945), Australian-British computer scientist
- Mike Brady (The Brady Bunch), a character on the TV program The Brady Bunch
