= Paul Brady (disambiguation) =

Paul Brady (born 1947) is an Irish singer-songwriter.

Paul Brady may also refer to:

- Paul Brady (handballer) (born 1979), Irish handballer
- Paul L. Brady (born 1927), American judge

== See also ==
- Paul Bradley (disambiguation)
- Paul Brody (born 1961), American jazz trumpeter, composer and bandleader
