= Judge Brady =

Judge Brady may refer to:

- Holly A. Brady (born 1969), judge of the United States District Court for the Northern District of Indiana
- James Joseph Brady (1944–2017), judge of the United States District Court for the Middle District of Louisiana

== See also ==
- Justice Brady (disambiguation)
