= Jim Brady (rugby league) =

English rugby league footballer

Personal information
- Born: 2 October 1949 (age 76)

Playing information
- Position: Scrum-half
Club
Years	Team	Pld	T	G	FG	P
1970–71	Warrington	11	2	0	0	6
1973	Oldham	1	0	0	0	0
1973–75	Swinton	20	7	0	0	21
	Total	32	9	0	0	27

Jim Brady is a former professional rugby league footballer who played in the 1970s. He played at club level for Warrington, and Swinton, as a scrum-half.

== Personal life ==
Jim Brady is the younger brother of the rugby league prop who played in the 1960s and 1970s for Warrington; Brian 'Bully' Brady.
