= Stephen Brady (disambiguation) =

Stephen Brady (born 1959) is an Australian diplomat.

Stephen or Steve Brady may also refer to:

- Stephen Brady (chess player) (born 1969), Irish chess player
- Steve Brady (baseball) (1851–1917), American baseball player
- Steve Brady (Sex and the City)

== See also ==
- Stephen Bradley (disambiguation)
