= Claire Brady =

Claire Brady may refer to:

- Claire Brady (athlete), Irish runner
- Claire Brady (Days of Our Lives), a character on Days of Our Lives
