= John Brady (author) =

British writer (died 1814)

- Died: 5 December 1814
- Occupations: Clerk, author

John Brady (died 5 December 1814) was an English clerk and author.

Brady was a clerk in the victualling office. He was the author of Clavis Calendaria; or a Compendious Analysis of the Calendar: illustrated with ecclesiastical, historical, and classical anecdotes, 2 vols., London, 1812, 8vo; 3rd edit., 1815. The compiler also published an abridgment of the work, and some extracts from it appeared in 1826, under the title The Credulity of our Forefathers. Brady died at Kennington, Surrey, on 5 December 1814. His son, John Henry Brady, arranged and adapted for publication Varieties of Literature; being principally selections from the portfolio of the late John Brady, London, 1826, 8vo.
