= Frank J. Brady =

American politician (1894–1964)

Member of the Nebraska Legislature from the 28th district
- In office January 5, 1937 – January 7, 1941
- Preceded by: Position created
- Succeeded by: Tony Asimus

Member of the Nebraska State Senate from the 22nd district
- In office January 1, 1935 – January 5, 1937
- Preceded by: Crist Anderson
- Succeeded by: Position abolished

Personal details
- Born: September 15, 1894 Atkinson, Nebraska
- Died: December 14, 1964 (aged 70) Atkinson, Nebraska
- Party: Republican
- Spouse: Luella Olson (m. 1930)
- Children: 1
- Education: University of Nebraska
- Occupation: Rancher, coal and grain dealer

Military service
- Allegiance: United States
- Branch/service: United States Army
- Unit: Ordnance Corps

Frank J. Brady (September 15, 1894 – December 14, 1964) was a Republican politician from Nebraska who served in the Nebraska State Senate from 1935 to 1937 and as a member of the Nebraska Legislature from the 28th district from 1937 to 1941.

== Early life ==
Brady was born in Atkinson, Nebraska, in 1894, and graduated from Atkinson High School in 1914. He attended the University of Nebraska, and served in the Ordnance Corps during World War I. Upon returning to Nebraska, Brady continued his university studies and later joined his father's grain distribution business, the J. F. Brady Company, which he ran until 1964. He served as president of the Nebraska Izaak Walton League, and successfully advocated for the creation of a nonpartisan Game and Parks Commission. He was elected to the Atkinson City Council in 1934.

== Nebraska State Senate ==
In 1934, Brady ran for the Nebraska State Senate from the 22nd district, which consisted of Boyd, Brown, Holt, Keya Paha, and Rock counties. He won the Republican primary, and then in the general election, faced John A. Robertson, who had defeated incumbent State Senator Crist Anderson in the Democratic primary. Brady defeated Robertson with 54 percent of the vote.

== Nebraska Legislature ==
When the State Senate and House were consolidated into the unicameral legislature in 1936, Brady ran for the newly created 28th district. He faced former State Senator Crist Anderson, State Senator Otto Bentzen, former State Representative L. G. Gillespie, E. S. Lingo, and J. M. Wilhelm. He and Gillespie were nominated in the primary, and he won the general election with 55 percent of the vote.

Brady ran for re-election in 1938, and was challenged by Anderson and Gillespie. Brady received 48 percent of the vote in the nonpartisan primary, and proceeded to the general election with Gillespie, who placed second with 27 percent of the vote. In the general election, he defeated Gillespie with 57 percent of the vote.

In 1940, Brady ran for a third term. He was challenged by Tony Asimus, John H. Jameson, Dean Selah, and Stanley Soukup. He received 44 percent of the vote in the primary, and advanced to the general election with Asimus, who placed second with 29 percent. In the general election, Asimus narrowly defeated Brady with 51 percent of the vote.

== Post-legislative career ==
Following Brady's defeat in 1940, Governor-elect Dwight Griswold announced that he would appoint Brady as the state Tax Commissioner. He stepped down in 1943, and was succeeded by Robert M. Armstrong.

== Death ==
Brady died on December 14, 1964.
