= John Thomas Brady =

American attorney and politician (1830–1890)

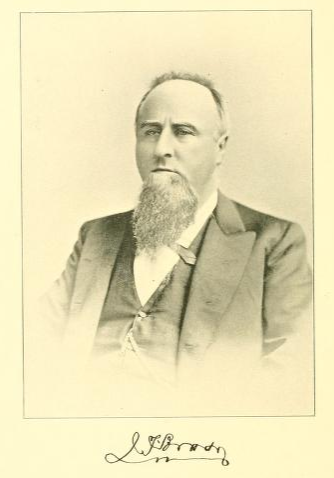
- John Thomas Brady

Tenth Texas Legislature
- In office 1863–1865

Eleventh Texas Legislature
- In office 1866–1867

Texas Senate
- Incumbent
- Assumed office 1876

Personal details
- Spouse(s): Caledonia Tinsley, Lennie Sherman, Estelle Jenkins

John Thomas Brady (October 10, 1830 – June 26, 1890) was an attorney, publisher, business promoter and politician. He served two terms in the Texas Legislature and one term in the Texas Senate.

== Early life and family ==
Brady was born on October 10, 1830, to John and Mary Brady in Charles County, Maryland. His father was a veteran of the War of 1812 and his family first arrived in Maryland in 1634. John Thomas was the eldest of four children. His three siblings were William, Emily, and Elizabeth. He attended school in Charles County before entering the work force at age seventeen.

In 1858, Brady married Caledonia Tinsley, the first of three wives. They resided at a 2,000 acre property known as The Cedars. After Caledonia died, he married the daughter of Sidney Sherman, Lennie, with whom he raised two children. After Lennie’s death, he married Estelle Jenkins, who bore a daughter.

== Career ==
Brady taught school while teaching himself law, passed the Maryland bar and practiced in that state. He moved to Missouri, near Kansas City, just a few years later. He acquired part interest in a newspaper, working as a journalist for two years. He moved to the Houston area in 1856. Brady established a residence in Harrisburg, Texas while practicing law in nearby Houston.

Brady served as aide to Confederate General John B. Magruder, and later to Commodore Leon Smith aboard the steamboat Bayou City. During the American Civil War, he was twice elected to the Texas Legislature. In 1876, he served in the Texas Senate. He was one of the organizers of the first Texas State Fair, then held in Houston. The fair committee invited Horace Greeley as its keynote speaker. Brady organized transportation companies in Houston. He co-founded the Texas Transportation Company in 1866, which was later absorbed by the Southern Pacific Railroad. He later served as the company’s president. He co-founded and served as president of the Houston Belt and Magnolia Park Railway Company, later acquired by the Missouri Pacific Railroad. He promoted a ship channel and turning basin in Buffalo Bayou, permitting a channel cut through his homestead, which created Brady’s Island.

== Death ==
Brady died of a stroke on June 26, 1890, in Houston. He is interred at Glenwood Cemetery in Houston.
