= Seán Brady =

Seán Brady may refer to:

- Seán Brady (Teachta Dála) (1890–1969), Fianna Fáil politician, member of the Dáil Éireann
- Seán Brady (senator) (1890–1969), Fianna Fáil politician, member of the Seanad Éireann
- Seán Ó Brádaigh (born 1937), Irish republican activist
- Seán Brady (cardinal) (born 1939), Irish cardinal and former archbishop of Armagh
- Sean Brady (fighter) (born 1992), American mixed martial artist
- Seán Brady (Gaelic footballer) (born 2003), Irish Gaelic footballer

== See also ==
- Shaun Brady, British trade union leader, ASLEF general secretary, 2003–2004
- Shawn Brady, fictional character on the America soap opera Days of Our Lives
