= Charles Stanislas Marion =

French general (1758–1812)

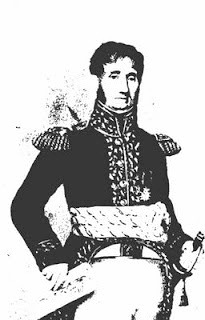

Charles Stanislas Marion (May 7, 1758, Charmes, Vosges – September 7, 1812) was a French general of the First French Empire during the Napoleonic Wars. He started his military service in 1776. He was promoted to general de brigade (brigadier general) in 1805. He was killed in action at the Battle of Borodino. He was the father of Charles Louis François Marion, 3rd Baron and grandfather of Charles Louis Raoul Marion, 4th Baron.
