= William Robert Brady =

American politician (1956–2023)

Member of the Kansas Senate from the 14th district
- In office January 15, 1991 – 1996
- Preceded by: Mike Johnston
- Succeeded by: Dwayne Umbarger

Member of the Kansas House of Representatives from the 6th district
- In office 1981 – January 15, 1991
- Succeeded by: Marvin Barkis

Personal details
- Born: May 25, 1956 Parsons, Kansas, U.S.
- Died: March 19, 2023 (aged 66) Lawrence, Kansas, U.S.
- Party: Democratic

William Robert Brady (May 25, 1956 – March 19, 2023) was an American politician who served in the Kansas State Senate and Kansas House of Representatives. He was born and raised in Parsons, Kansas, and was originally elected to the State House in 1980. He was re-elected five times, and resigned his seat in 1991 to replace Mike Johnston in the State Senate. He won re-election to the Senate in his own right in 1992, and served until 1996. Brady died in Lawrence, Kansas on March 19, 2023, at the age of 66.
