= Thomas Brady (general) =

Irish-Austrian general

Thomas Brady (1752? – 1827) was an Irish general (feldzeugmeister) in the Austrian army.

Brady was born at Cavan, Ireland (one account gives Cootehill instead) between October 1752 and May 1753. He entered the Austrian service on 1 November 1769. On the list for that date his name appears as "Peter", but in all subsequent rolls he is called "Thomas". Brady served until 4 April 1774 as a cadet in the Wied infantry regiment. On 10 April 1774 he was promoted to ensign in the Fabri infantry regiment; he became a lieutenant on 30 November 1775, first lieutenant 20 March 1784, and captain in 1788. He distinguished himself as a lieutenant at Habelschwerdt in 1778, and received the Maria Theresa Cross for personal bravery at the storming of Novi on 3 November 1788, during the Turkish war with Austria and Russia.

He was appointed major on 20 July 1790, served on the staff until 1793, and on 1 April of that year was appointed lieutenant colonel of the corps of Tyrolean sharpshooters. He was transferred on 21 December to the Murray infantry regiment, of which he became colonel on 6 February 1794. Brady fought with that regiment in General Latour's corps at Frankenthal in 1795, and distinguished himself on 19 June 1796 at Ukerad. He was promoted to major general on 6 September 1796, at which rank he served in Italy and commanded at Cattaro in 1799. He became Lieutenant General on 28 January 1801, and in 1803 was made honorary colonel of the Imperial (first) infantry regiment.

In 1804, Brady was appointed governor of Dalmatia. In 1807, he was made privy councillor in recognition of his service as general of a division in Bohemia. In 1809 he took a leading role in the Battle of Aspern, with a large portion of the Austrian army under his command. General Brady retired on health grounds on 3 September 1809, and died 16 October 1827.
