= 1960–61 West Ham United F.C. season =

English football team season

West Ham United
1960–61 season
- Chairman: Reg Pratt
- Manager: Ted Fenton (until 31 March 1961); Ron Greenwood (from 1 April 1961)
- First Division: 16th
- FA Cup: Third round
- League Cup: Second round
- Top goalscorer: League: Musgrove (17); All: Dick (19)
- Average home league attendance: 21,948
Home colours

During the 1960–61 English football season, West Ham United competed in the Football League First Division.

== Season summary ==
In the 1960–61 season, Ted Fenton left West Ham in March which was never fully explained by the club. Under strain and on sick-leave and with West Ham's league position suffering he left the club under circumstances which both he and the club decided would remain confidential. He was succeeded as manager in April 1961 by Ron Greenwood, who guided the Hammers to a 16th-place finish at the end of the campaign.

West Ham won just one match on the road during the season, a 2-1 defeat of Manchester City on 12 November. The Hammers lost 12 away matches, which dramatically impacted the team's place in the league table.

The biggest win of the year was a 6-0 victory at home against Arsenal on 5 November. Dave Dunmore scored a hat trick while John Dick, Andy Malcolm, and Phil Woosnam contributed scores as well.

The Hammers faced Second-Division side Stoke City in the Third Round of the FA Cup. The Potters forced a replay with a 2-2 draw at Upton Park. West Ham once again faltered away from home with a 1-0 defeat in the replay match.

== Final league table ==
Pos	Team	Pld	W	D	L	GF	GA	GAv	Pts	Qualification or relegation
14	Nottingham Forest	42	14	9	19	62	78	0.795	37	Qualification for the Inter-Cities Fairs Cup first round
15	Cardiff City	42	13	11	18	60	85	0.706	37	
16	West Ham United	42	13	10	19	77	88	0.875	36	
17	Fulham	42	14	8	20	72	95	0.758	36	
18	Bolton Wanderers	42	12	11	19	58	73	0.795	35	

Source: World Football
Rules for classification: 1) Points; 2) Goal average; 3) Goals scored

== Results ==
West Ham United's score comes first

=== Legend ===
Win	Draw	Loss

=== Football League First Division ===
Date	Opponent	Venue	Result	Attendance	Scorers
20 August 1960	Wolverhampton Wanderers	A	2–4	37,266	Dick, Woosnam
22 August 1960	Aston Villa	H	5–2	28,959	Dunmore, Woosnam, Dick, Musgrove, Bond
27 August 1960	Bolton Wanderers	H	2–1	24,283	Musgrove, Dick
29 August 1960	Aston Villa	A	1–2	32,098	Dunmore
3 September 1960	Sheffield Wednesday	A	0–1	26,359	
5 September 1960	Manchester United	H	2–1	30,506	Brett, Musgrove
10 September 1960	Chelsea	A	2–3	37,873	Grice, Dunmore
14 September 1960	Manchester United	A	1–6	33,288	Brett
17 September 1960	Blackpool	H	3–3	23,521	Woodley, Musgrove, Bond
24 September 1960	Everton	A	1–4	46,291	Beesley
1 October 1960	Blackburn Rovers	H	3–2	17,519	Dick (2), Woosnam
8 October 1960	Birmingham City	H	4–3	15,954	Grice (2), Dunmore, Musgrove
15 October 1960	West Bromwich Albion	A	0–1	22,009	
22 October 1960	Preston North End	H	5–2	16,295	Musgrove (3), Dick, Bond (pen)
29 October 1960	Fulham	A	1–1	20,949	Dunmore
5 November 1960	Arsenal	H	6–0	29,275	Dunmore (3), Woosnam, Dick, Malcolm
12 November 1960	Manchester City	A	2–1	33,751	Grice, Dunmore
19 November 1960	Nottingham Forest	H	2–4	21,047	Dunmore, Palmer (own goal)
3 December 1960	Cardiff City	H	2–0	13,967	Musgrove, Dunmore
10 December 1960	Newcastle United	A	5–5	20,106	Musgrove, Dunmore, Dick, McMichael (own goal), Bond (pen)
17 December 1960	Wolverhampton Wanderers	H	5–0	22,336	Dunmore (2), Moore, Musgrove, Dick
24 December 1960	Tottenham Hotspur	A	0–2	54,930	
26 December 1960	Tottenham Hotspur	H	0–3	34,351	
31 December 1960	Bolton Wanderers	A	1–3	15,931	Musgrove
14 January 1961	Sheffield Wednesday	H	1–1	20,650	Dick
21 January 1961	Chelsea	H	3–1	21,829	Woosnam, Obeney, Dick
4 February 1961	Blackpool	A	0–3	9,947	
11 February 1961	Everton	H	4–0	22,322	Obeney (2), Musgrove, Dick
25 February 1961	Birmingham City	A	2–4	16,856	Musgrove, Scott
4 March 1961	West Bromwich Albion	H	1–2	21,607	Dick
11 March 1961	Preston North End	A	0–4	12,084	
18 March 1961	Fulham	H	1–2	18,742	Obeney
20 March 1961	Blackburn Rovers	A	1–4	13,953	Woods (own goal)
25 March 1961	Arsenal	A	0–0	27,505	
31 March 1961	Leicester City	H	1–0	22,010	Dick
1 April 1961	Newcastle United	H	1–1	18,997	Musgrove
3 April 1961	Leicester City	A	1–5	23,776	Kirkup
8 April 1961	Nottingham Forest	A	1–1	23,083	Dick
15 April 1961	Manchester City	H	1–1	17,982	Sealey
18 April 1961	Burnley	A	2–2	11,609	Musgrove (2)
22 April 1961	Cardiff City	A	1–1	9,549	Dick
29 April 1961	Burnley	H	1–2	18,759	Woosnam

=== FA Cup ===
Round	Date	Opponent	Venue	Result	Attendance	Goalscorers
R3	7 January 1961	Stoke City	H	2–2	21,545	Dick, Dunmore
R3R	11 January 1961	Stoke City	A	0–1	28,914	

=== League Cup ===
Round	Date	Opponent	Venue	Result	Attendance	Goalscorers
R1	26 September 1960	Charlton Athletic	H	3–1	12,496	Dick, Moore, Musgrove
R2	24 October 1960	Darlington	A	2–3	16,911	Dunmore, Dick

== Squad ==
Note: Flags indicate national team as defined under FIFA eligibility rules; some limited exceptions apply. Players may hold more than one non-FIFA nationality.

Pos.	Nation	Player
GK	ENG	Brian Rhodes
DF	ENG	John Bond
DF	ENG	Ken Brown
DF	ENG	Bobby Moore
DF	ENG	John Lyall
MF	ENG	Andy Malcolm
MF	ENG	Malcolm Musgrove
FW	WAL	Phil Woosnam
FW	SCO	John Dick
FW	ENG	Dave Dunmore
MF	ENG	Mike Grice
DF	ENG	Joe Kirkup
MF	ENG	Tony Scott

Pos.	Nation	Player
DF	IRL	Noel Cantwell
FW	ENG	Ron Brett
FW	ENG	Geoff Hurst
MF	ENG	Alan Sealey
FW	ENG	Harry Obeney
GK	ENG	Peter Shearing
MF	ENG	Derek Woodley
FW	ENG	Andy Smillie
MF	ENG	Ronnie Boyce
FW	ENG	Mick Beesley
FW	ENG	Johnny Cartwright
FW	ENG	Billy Lansdowne
MF	ENG	Eddie Bovington
