= 1962–63 West Ham United F.C. season =

English football team season

West Ham United
1962–63 season
- Chairman: Reg Pratt
- Manager: Ron Greenwood
- Stadium: Boleyn Ground
- First Division: 12th
- FA Cup: Sixth round
- League Cup: Third round
- Top goalscorer: League: Geoff Hurst (13); All: Geoff Hurst (15)
Home colours

This was West Ham's fifth season in the First Division since their return in season 1957–58. The club were managed by Ron Greenwood and the team captain was Bobby Moore.

== Season summary ==
The season started badly for West Ham and it was not until their sixth game that they managed to win. By the end of 1962 they were in 11th place. Their season was greatly affected by the bad winter of 1962–63 when no games were played at all between 29 December 1962 and 4 February 1963. They finished in 12th place. Geoff Hurst was the top scorer with 15 goals in all competitions and 13 in the league. The next highest scorer was Johnny Byrne with 14. Bobby Moore and Ken Brown made the most appearances; 47 in all competitions. West Ham made the sixth round of the FA Cup before being eliminated by Liverpool but only managed to reach the third round of the League Cup before losing to Rotherham United.

The season saw the last West Ham appearance for future club manager John Lyall who had to retire due to injury, John Dick who had been at the club since 1953 and the first season as a regular player and first goals for future World Cup winner, Martin Peters.

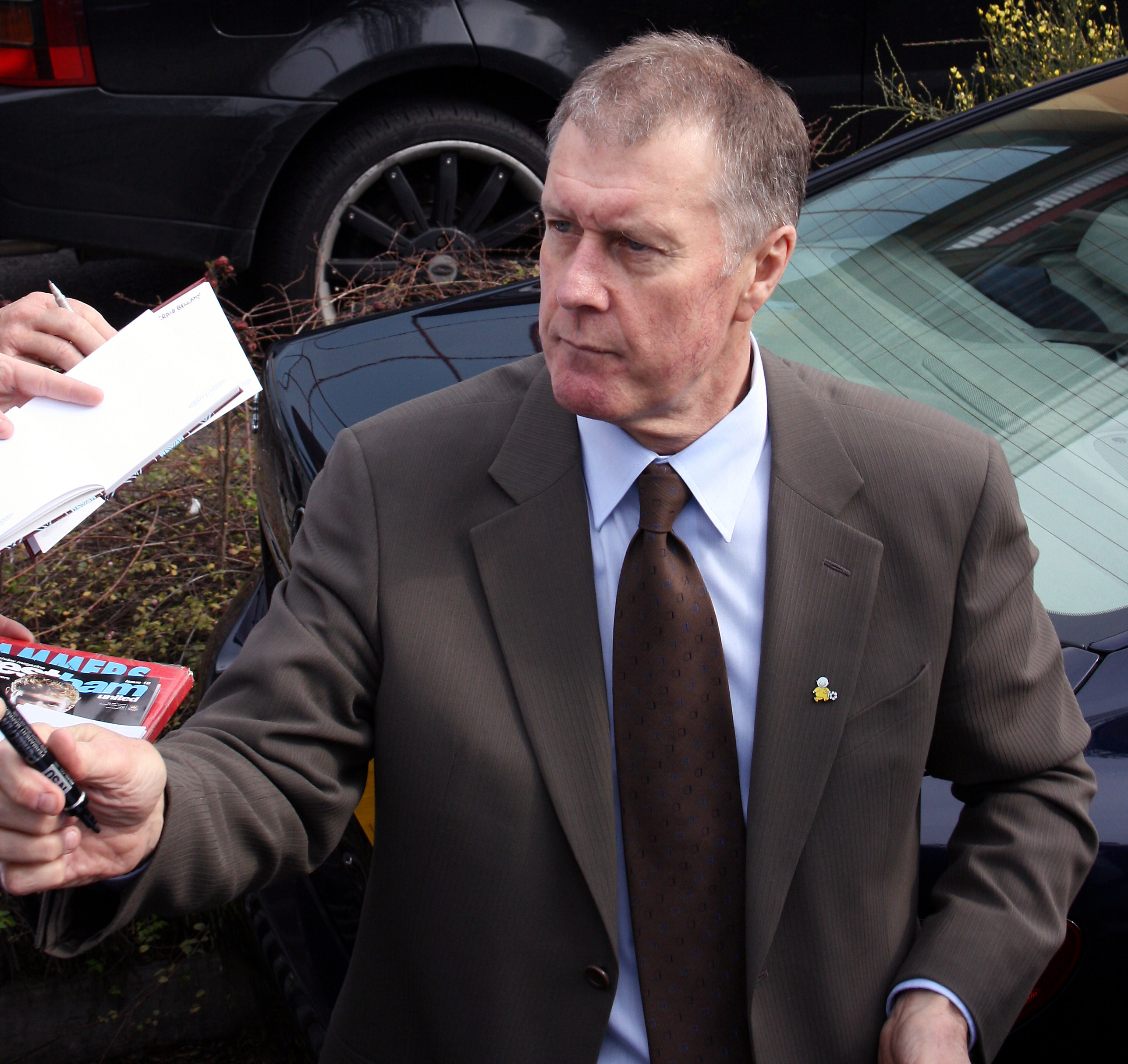
Leading goalscorer, Geoff Hurst

=== First Division ===
Pos	Team	Pld	W	D	L	GF	GA	GAv	Pts
10	Sheffield United	42	16	12	14	58	60	0.967	44
11	Blackburn Rovers	42	15	12	15	79	71	1.113	42
12	West Ham United	42	14	12	16	73	69	1.058	40
13	Blackpool	42	13	14	15	58	64	0.906	40
14	West Bromwich Albion	42	16	7	19	71	79	0.899	39

Source: World Football
Rules for classification: 1) Points; 2) Goal average; 3) Goals scored

== Results ==
West Ham United's score comes first

=== Legend ===
Win	Draw	Loss

=== Football League First Division ===
Date	Opponent	Venue	Result	Attendance	Scorers
18 August 1962	Aston Villa	A	1–3	37,657	Byrne
20 August 1962	Wolverhampton Wanderers	H	1–4	30,002	Musgrove
25 August 1962	Tottenham Hotspur	H	1–6	32,527	Woosnam
29 August 1962	Wolverhampton Wanderers	A	0–0	36,844	
1 September 1962	Leyton Orient	A	0–2	23,918	
3 September 1962	Liverpool	H	1–0	22,258	Scott
8 September 1962	Manchester City	A	6–1	24,069	Peters, Scott, Byrne, Musgrove, Hurst
12 September 1962	Liverpool	A	1–2	39,261	Byrne
14 September 1962	Blackpool	H	2–2	24,695	Scott, Musgrove
22 September 1962	Blackburn Rovers	A	4–0	15,454	Peters, Byrne, Hurst, Musgrove
29 September 1962	Sheffield United	H	1–1	22,800	Scott
6 October 1962	Birmingham City	H	5–0	21,150	Byrne (2), Hurst, Musgrove, Brown
13 October 1962	Arsenal	A	1–1	49,597	Scott
22 October 1962	Burnley	H	1–1	34,612	Hurst
27 October 1962	Manchester United	A	1–3	29,419	Hurst
3 November 1962	Bolton Wanderers	H	1–2	19,885	Moore
10 November 1962	Leicester City	A	0–2	21,064	
17 November 1962	Fulham	H	2–2	17,668	Peters, Hurst
24 November 1962	Sheffield Wednesday	A	3–1	21,762	Peters, Brabrook, Scott
1 December 1962	West Bromwich Albion	H	2–2	20,769	Moore, Hurst
8 December 1962	Everton	A	1–1	38,701	Brabrook
15 December 1962	Aston Villa	H	1–1	21,529	Peters
22 December 1962	Tottenham Hotspur	A	4–4	44,650	Kirkup, Peters, Scott, Boyce
29 December 1962	Nottingham Forest	A	4–3	18,660	Brabrook (2), Byrne, McKinlay (og)
16 February 1963	Sheffield United	A	2–0	18,176	Boyce, Sealey
2 March 1963	Arsenal	H	0–4	31,976	
9 March 1963	Burnley	A	1–1	17,197	Byrne
18 March 1963	Manchester United	H	3–1	28,950	Brown, Sealey, Brennan (og)
23 March 1963	Bolton Wanderers	A	0–3	19,177	
2 April 1963	Sheffield Wednesday	H	2–1	20,048	Hurst, Byrne
6 April 1963	Fulham	A	0–2	26,761	
12 April 1963	Ipswich Town	H	1–3	23,170	Scott
13 April 1963	Leicester City	H	2–0	25,689	Sealey (2)
15 April 1963	Ipswich Town	A	3–2	21,988	Hurst, Peter, Brabrook
20 April 1963	West Bromwich Albion	A	0–1	10,315	
22 April 1963	Nottingham Forest	H	4–1	18,179	Peters, Moore, Hurst (2)
27 April 1963	Everton	H	1–2	28,391	Meagan (og)
1 May 1963	Birmingham City	A	2–3	14,410	Scott, Hurst
4 May 1963	Blackburn Rovers	H	0–1	18,898	
11 May 1963	Leyton Orient	H	2–0	16,745	Brabrook, Scott
13 May 1963	Blackpool	A	0–0	12,434	
18 May 1963	Manchester City	H	6–1	16,602	Brabrook, Boyce, Hurst (2), Sealey (2)

=== FA Cup ===
Round	Date	Opponent	Venue	Result	Attendance	Goalscorers
R3	4 February 1963	Fulham	H	0–0	21,000	
R3 Replay	20 February 1963	Fulham	A	2–1	20,000	Boyce, Byrne
R4	4 March 1963	Swansea Town	H	1–0	25,924	Boyce
R5	16 March 1963	Everton	H	1–0	31,77	Byrne (pen) 58'
R6	30 March 1963	Liverpool	A	0–1	49,036	

=== League Cup ===
Round	Date	Opponent	Venue	Result	Attendance	Goalscorers
R2	26 September 1962	Plymouth Argyle	H	6–0	9,714	Peters, Byrne (3), Hurst, Musgrove
R3	16 October 1962	Rotherham United	A	1–3	11,581	Hurst

== Squad ==
Note: Flags indicate national team as defined under FIFA eligibility rules; some limited exceptions apply. Players may hold more than one non-FIFA nationality.

Pos.	Nation	Player
DF	ENG	John Bond
MF	ENG	Eddie Bovington
MF	ENG	Ron Boyce
FW	ENG	Peter Brabrook
FW	ENG	Martin Britt
DF	ENG	Ken Brown
DF	ENG	Jack Burkett
FW	ENG	Johnny Byrne
DF	ENG	John Charles
FW	SCO	Ian Crawford
FW	ENG	Brian Dear
FW	SCO	John Dick
GK	ENG	Alan Dickie

Pos.	Nation	Player
FW	ENG	Geoff Hurst
DF	ENG	Joe Kirkup
MF	ENG	Bill Lansdowne
GK	SCO	Lawrie Leslie
DF	SCO	John Lyall
DF	ENG	Bobby Moore (captain)
MF	ENG	Malcolm Musgrove
MF	ENG	Martin Peters
GK	ENG	Brian Rhodes
FW	ENG	Tony Scott
FW	ENG	John Sissons
GK	ENG	Jim Standen
FW	WAL	Phil Woosnam
