= 1959–60 West Ham United F.C. season =

English football team season

West Ham United
1959–60 season
- Chairman: Reg Pratt
- Manager: Ted Fenton
- First Division: 14th
- FA Cup: Third round
- Southern Floodlit Cup: Runner-up
- Top goalscorer: League: Musgrove (15); All: Musgrove (20)
- Average home league attendance: 28,554
Home colours

West Ham United competed in the First Division for the 1959-1960 English football season. The Hammers fell to 14th in the table after their impressive 6th-place finish the previous season.

== League table ==
Pos	Team	Pld	W	D	L	GF	GA	GAv	Pts
12	Leicester City	42	13	13	16	66	75	0.880	39
13	Arsenal	42	15	9	18	68	80	0.850	39
14	West Ham United	42	16	6	20	75	91	0.824	38
15	Everton	42	13	11	18	73	78	0.936	37
16	Manchester City	42	17	3	22	78	84	0.929	37

Source: World Football
Rules for classification: 1) Points; 2) Goal average; 3) Goals scored

== Results ==
=== Legend ===
Win	Draw	Loss

Date	Opponent	Venue	Result	Attendance
22 August 1959	Leicester City	H	W 3-0	27,996
25 August 1959	Preston North End	A	D 1-1	29,489
29 August 1959	Burnley	A	W 3-1	26,756
31 August 1959	Preston North End	H	W 2-1	31,916
05 September 1959	Leeds United	H	L 1-2	27,777
09 September 1959	Tottenham Hotspur	A	D 2-2	58,909
12 September 1959	Bolton Wanderers	A	L 1-5	24,240
14 September 1959	Tottenham Hotspur	H	L 1-2	36,831
19 September 1959	Chelsea	A	W 4-2	54,349
26 September 1959	West Bromwich Albion	H	W 4-1	29,957
03 October 1959	Newcastle United	A	D 0-0	41,924
10 October 1959	Luton Town	H	W 3-1	23,266
17 October 1959	Everton	A	W 1-0	30,563
24 October 1959	Blackpool	H	W 1-0	32,374
31 October 1959	Fulham	A	L 0-1	44,858
07 November 1959	Manchester City	H	W 4-1	25,243
14 November 1959	Arsenal	A	W 3-1	49,583
21 November 1959	Wolverhampton Wanderers	H	W 3-2	37,941
28 November 1959	Sheffield Wednesday	A	L 0-7	36,899
05 December 1959	Nottingham Forest	H	W 4-1	25,765
12 December 1959	Blackburn Rovers	A	L 2-6	22,261
19 December 1959	Leicester City	A	L 1-2	17,316
26 December 1959	Birmingham City	A	L 0-2	29,745
28 December 1959	Birmingham City	H	W 3-1	26,154
02 January 1960	Burnley	H	L 2-5	25,752
16 January 1960	Leeds United	A	L 0-3	15,284
23 January 1960	Bolton Wanderers	H	L 1-2	21,155
06 February 1960	Chelsea	H	W 4-2	29,655
20 February 1960	Newcastle United	H	L 3-5	27,073
27 February 1960	Nottingham Forest	A	L 1-3	26,465
05 March 1960	Everton	H	D 2-2	25,029
09 March 1960	West Bromwich Albion	A	L 2-3	12,113
12 March 1960	Blackpool	A	L 2-3	14,515
19 March 1960	Blackburn Rovers	H	W 2-1	25,921
30 March 1960	Manchester City	A	L 1-3	29,572
02 April 1960	Arsenal	H	D 0-0	28,818
11 April 1960	Wolverhampton Wanderers	A	L 0-5	48,086
15 April 1960	Manchester United	H	W 2-1	34,969
16 April 1960	Fulham	H	L 1-2	34,085
18 April 1960	Manchester United	A	L 3-5	34,505
23 April 1960	Luton Town	A	L 1-3	11,404
30 April 1960	Sheffield Wednesday	H	D 1-1	21,964

Source: Statto.com

== Squad ==
This is a complete list of appearances by members of the professional playing squad of West Ham United F.C. during the 1959–60 season.

No.		Player	Position	Lge Apps	Lge Gls	FAC Apps	FAC Gls	SFC Apps	SFC Gls	Total Apps	Total Gls	Date signed	Previous club
West Ham United F.C. 1959–1960 First XI (Most appearances)
1	(Republic of Ireland)	Noel Dwyer	GK	26		2				28		1958	Wolves
2	(England)	John Bond	RB	35	7	2			1	37	8	1951	Amateur
3	(Republic of Ireland)	Noel Cantwell (Captain)	LB	40		2				42		1952	Cork United F.C.
4	(England)	Andy Malcolm	RH	40		2				42		1953	Academy
5	(England)	Ken Brown	CH	40	3	2				42	3	1952	Academy
6	(England)	John Smith	LH	28	1	2				30	1	1956	Academy
7	(England)	Mike Grice	OR	34	5	2			1	36	6	1955	Colchester United
8	(Wales)	Phil Woosnam	IR	38	11	2			1	40	12	November 1958	Leyton Orient
9	(England)	Vic Keeble	CF	15	6					15	6	1957	Newcastle United
10	(Scotland)	John Dick	IL	24	11	1	1			25	12	1953	Crittall Athletic
11	(England)	Malcolm Musgrove (Hammer of the Year)	OL	41	15	2	1		4	43	20	1953	Lynmouth Colliery
Players with 10+ appearances
2	(England)	Joe Kirkup	RB	16						16		1958	Academy
1	(England)	Brian Rhodes	GK	15						15		1957	Academy
10	(England)	Andy Smillie	IL	13	3	1			1	14	4	1958	Academy
6	(England)	Bobby Moore	LH	13						13		1958	Academy
9	(England)	Harry Obeney	CF	9	5	2			4	11	9	1956	Briggs Sports
Other players with appearances
9	(England)	Dave Dunmore	CF	9	2					9	2	1960	Tottenham Hotspur
10	(England)	Ron Brett	IL	7	2					7	2	1959	Crystal Palace
7	(England)	Tony Scott	OR	4	1					4	1	1957	Academy
7	(England)	Derek Woodley	OR	3	2					3	2	1959	Academy
8	(England)	John Cartwright	IR	3					3	3	3	1959	Academy
6	(England)	Geoff Hurst	LH	3						3		1959	Academy
3	(England)	John Lyall	LB	2						2		1959	Academy
4	(England)	Eddie Bovington	RH	1						1		1959	Academy
1	(England)	Ernie Gregory	GK	1						1		1939	Leytonstone
5	(England)	Bill Lansdowne	CH	1						1		1955	Woodford
7	(England)	Doug Wragg	OR	1					2	1	2	1956	Academy
