= 1963–64 West Ham United F.C. season =

English football team season

West Ham won the FA Cup Final for the first time, coming from behind to beat Preston North End 3–2. The goals were scored by John Sissons, Geoff Hurst and Ronnie Boyce.

== League table ==
Pos	Team	Pld	W	D	L	GF	GA	GAv	Pts	Qualification or relegation
12	Sheffield United	42	16	11	15	61	64	0.953	43	
13	Nottingham Forest	42	16	9	17	64	68	0.941	41	
14	West Ham United	42	14	12	16	69	74	0.932	40	Qualification for the European Cup Winners' Cup first round
15	Fulham	42	13	13	16	58	65	0.892	39	
16	Wolverhampton Wanderers	42	12	15	15	70	80	0.875	39	

Source: World Football
Rules for classification: 1) Points; 2) Goal average; 3) Goals scored

== Squad ==
Number		Player	Position	Lge Apps	Lge Gls	FAC Apps	FAC Gls	LC Apps	LC Gls	Date signed	Previous club
FA Cup Final Team
1	(England)	Jim Standen	GK	39		7		7		1962	Luton
2	(England)	John Bond	RB	26		7		6	1	1951	Amateur
3	(England)	Jack Burkett	LB	40	1	7		7		1962	Academy
4	(England)	Eddie Bovington	RH	22		7		3		1960	Academy
5	(England)	Ken Brown	CH	36		7		6		1952	Academy
6	(England)	Bobby Moore (Captain)	LH	37	2	7		6		1958	Academy
7	(England)	Peter Brabrook	OR	38	8	7	2	6	2	1962	Chelsea
8	(England)	Ronnie Boyce	IR	41	6	7	3	7	2	1960	Academy
9	(England)	Johnny Byrne (Hammer of the Year)	CF	33	24	7	4	5	5	1961	Crystal Palace
10	(England)	Geoff Hurst	IL	37	14	7	7	6	5	1959	Academy
11	(England)	John Sissons	OL	14	3	7	3	1		1962	Academy
Important Players
4	(England)	Martin Peters	RH	32	3			4		1962	Academy
7	(England)	Alan Sealey	OR	18	2			4	1	1961	Leyton Orient
2	(England)	Joe Kirkup	RB	18				1		1958	Academy
Other Players
11	(England)	Tony Scott	OL	10				3	3	1959	Academy
9	(England)	Martin Britt	CF	9	3			2	1	1962	Academy
10	(England)	Roger Hugo	F	3	2					1964	Academy
11	(England)	Brian Dear	OL	3						1962	Academy
1	(England)	Alan Dickie	GK	3						1961	Academy
5	(England)	Dave Bickles	CH	2				1		1963	Academy
4	(England)	John Charles	HB					2		1962	Academy
8	(England)	Peter Bennett	IR	1						1963	Academy
