= 1965–66 West Ham United F.C. season =

English football team season

West Ham, a United Football Club, managed to reach the semi-final of the Cup Winners Cup losing 5–2 on aggregate to Borussia Dortmund.

The previous month West Ham lost the League Cup Final after leading in the first leg, to West Brom.

Bobby Moore managed to lift one trophy later that summer as fellow Hammers Geoff Hurst and Martin Peters secured England's World Cup triumph, with goals against West Germany.

Johnny Byrne was also in Alf Ramsey's 28 man England squad which assembled at Lilleshall on 6 June 1966.

== League table ==
| Pos | Team | Pld | W | D | L | GF | GA | GAv | Pts | Qualification or relegation |
|---|---|---|---|---|---|---|---|---|---|---|
| 10 | Stoke City | 42 | 15 | 12 | 15 | 65 | 64 | 1.016 | 42 | |
| 11 | Everton | 42 | 15 | 11 | 16 | 56 | 62 | 0.903 | 41 | Qualification for the European Cup Winners' Cup first round (Note: Everton qualified for the European Cup Winners' Cup as the 1965–66 FA Cup winners.) |
| 12 | West Ham United | 42 | 15 | 9 | 18 | 70 | 83 | 0.843 | 39 | |
| 13 | Blackpool | 42 | 14 | 9 | 19 | 55 | 65 | 0.846 | 37 | |
| 14 | Arsenal | 42 | 12 | 13 | 17 | 62 | 75 | 0.827 | 37 | |

Source: World Football
Rules for classification: 1) Points; 2) Goal average; 3) Goals scored

== Squad ==
| Number | | Player | Position | Eur Apps | Eur Gls | Lge Apps | Lge Gls | FAC Apps | FAC Gls | LC Apps | LC Gls | Date signed | Previous club |
West Ham United XI 1965–1966
| 1 | (England) | Jim Standen | GK | 6 | | 37 | | 4 | | 8 | | 1962 | Luton |
| 2 | (England) | Dennis Burnett | RB | 2 | | 24 | | 4 | 1 | 6 | 2 | 1965 | Academy |
| 3 | (England) | John Charles | LB | 4 | | 25 | | | | 7 | 1 | 1962 | Academy |
| 4 | (England) | Eddie Bovington | CM | 4 | | 31 | | 4 | | 9 | 1 | 1960 | Academy |
| 5 | (England) | Ken Brown | CH | 6 | | 23 | 1 | 3 | | 9 | | 1952 | Academy |
| 6 | (England) | Bobby Moore (Captain) | CH | 6 | | 37 | | 4 | | 9 | 2 | 1958 | Academy |
| 7 | (England) | Peter Brabrook | RM | 6 | 1 | 32 | 8 | 4 | 1 | 8 | 2 | 1962 | Chelsea |
| 8 | (England) | Martin Peters | CM | 6 | 3 | 40 | 11 | 4 | | 10 | 3 | 1962 | Academy |
| 9 | (England) | Johnny Byrne | CF | 5 | 3 | 23 | 9 | 3 | | 6 | 5 | 1961 | Crystal Palace |
| 10 | (England) | Geoff Hurst (Hammer of the Year) | CF | 6 | 2 | 39 | 23 | 4 | 4 | 10 | 11 | 1959 | Academy |
| 11 | (England) | John Sissons | LM | 4 | 1 | 36 | 5 | 2 | 1 | 9 | 1 | 1962 | Academy |
Important Players
| 3 | (England) | Jack Burkett | LB | 2 | | 19 | 2 | 4 | | 4 | | 1962 | Academy |
| 2 | (England) | Joe Kirkup | RB | 2 | | 17 | 1 | | | 4 | | 1958 | Academy |
| 8 | (England) | Ronnie Boyce | IR | 4 | | 16 | 2 | 1 | | 2 | | 1960 | Academy |
| 9 | (England) | Martin Britt | CF | | | 10 | 3 | | | 4 | | 1962 | Academy |
| 5 | (England) | Dave Bickles | M | | | 12(1) | | | | | | 1963 | Academy |
| 11 | (England) | Brian Dear | F | 1 | | 7 | 1 | 1 | | 1 | | 1962 | Academy |
| 8 | (England) | Jimmy Bloomfield | F | 2 | | 9 (1) | | 2 | 1 | | | 1965 | Brentford |
Other Players
| 7 | (England) | Peter Bennett | RW | | | 7 (1) | 1 | | | 2 | | 1963 | Academy |
| 7 | (England) | Harry Redknapp | RW | | | 7 | 1 | | | | | 1965 | Academy |
| 1 | (England) | Alan Dickie | GK | | | 5 | | | | 2 | | 1961 | Academy |
| 11 | (England) | Tony Scott | LW | | | 2 | | | | | | 1959 | Academy |
| 3 | (England) | Eddie Presland | LB | | | 2 | | | | | | 1964 | Academy |
| 4 | (England) | Trevor Dawkins | D | | | 2 | | | | | | 1964 | Academy |
