= 1964 FA Cup final =

- Event: 1963–64 FA Cup
West Ham United	Preston North End
3	2
- Date: 2 May 1964
- Venue: Wembley Stadium, London
- Referee: Arthur Holland (Barnsley)
- Attendance: 100,000

The 1964 FA Cup final was the 83rd final of the FA Cup. It took place on 2 May 1964 at Wembley Stadium and was contested between West Ham United and Preston North End.

West Ham, captained by Bobby Moore and managed by Ron Greenwood, won the match 3–2 to win the FA Cup for the first time. Second Division Preston led twice through Doug Holden and Alex Dawson respectively, with John Sissons and Geoff Hurst equalising for West Ham. Ronnie Boyce then scored the winner for the London club in the 90th minute.

Preston's Howard Kendall became the youngest player to play in a Wembley FA Cup Final, aged 17 years and 345 days. He retained this record until Paul Allen played in the 1980 final for West Ham at the age of 17 years and 256 days.

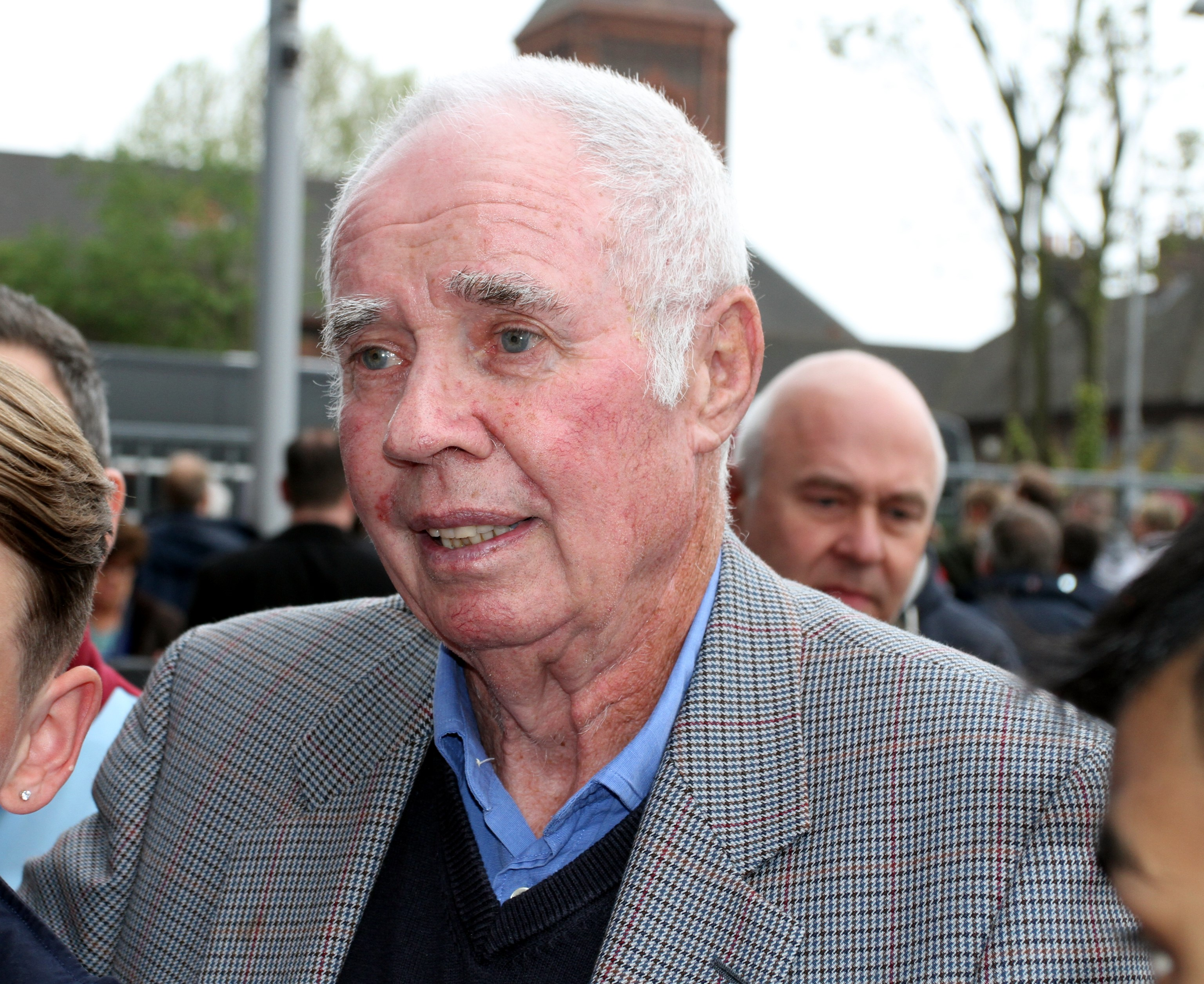
Ronnie Boyce, scorer of West Ham's winning goal, in 2015.

== Road to Wembley ==
Preston North End

Round 3: Nottingham Forest 0–0 Preston North End

Replay: Preston North End 1–0 Nottingham Forest

Round 4: Bolton Wanderers 2–2 Preston North End

Replay: Preston North End 2–1 Bolton Wanderers

Round 5: Preston North End 1–0 Carlisle United

Round 6: Oxford United 1–2 Preston North End

Semi-final: Preston North End 2–1 Swansea Town

(at Villa Park)

West Ham United

Round 3: West Ham United 3–0 Charlton Athletic

Round 4: Leyton Orient 1–1 West Ham United

Replay: West Ham United 3–0 Leyton Orient

Round 5: Swindon Town 1–3 West Ham United

Round 6: West Ham United 3–2 Burnley

Semi-final: West Ham United 3–1 Manchester United

(at Hillsborough)

== Match details ==
2 May 1964
15:00 BST

Preston North End	2–3	West Ham United
Holden 10'; Dawson 40'		Sissons 11'; Hurst 52'; Boyce 90'

Wembley Stadium, London
Attendance: 100,000
Referee: Arthur Holland

Preston North End	West Ham United

GK	1	(Republic of Ireland) Alan Kelly
RB	2	(Scotland) George Ross
LB	3	(Scotland) Jim Smith
RH	4	(England) Nobby Lawton (c)
CH	5	(England) Tony Singleton
LH	6	(England) Howard Kendall
OR	7	(England) Dave Wilson
IR	8	(England) Alec Ashworth
CF	9	(Scotland) Alex Dawson
IL	10	(England) Alan Spavin
OL	11	(England) Doug Holden
Manager:
(Scotland) Jimmy Milne

GK	1	(England) Jim Standen
RB	2	(England) John Bond
LB	3	(England) Jack Burkett
RH	4	(England) Eddie Bovington
CH	5	(England) Ken Brown
LH	6	(England) Bobby Moore (c)
OR	7	(England) Peter Brabrook
IR	8	(England) Ronnie Boyce
CF	9	(England) Johnny Byrne
IL	10	(England) Geoff Hurst
OL	11	(England) John Sissons
Manager:
(England) Ron Greenwood
