= Eddie Bovington =

English footballer (born 1941)

Personal information
- Full name: Edward Ernest Perrian Bovington
- Date of birth: 23 April 1941 (age 85)
- Place of birth: Edmonton, London, England
- Position: Wing half

Senior career*
Years	Team	Apps	(Gls)
1959–1968	West Ham United	138	(1)
- * Club domestic league appearances and goals

Edward Ernest Perrian Bovington (born 23 April 1941) is an English former footballer who played for West Ham United as a right-half.

Bovington played junior football with West Ham, and was a member of the FA Youth Cup Final team of 1958–59 alongside Bobby Moore, Harry Cripps and Jack Burkett.

He made his senior debut in a Football League match against Manchester United on 18 April 1960, although it was to be another 18 months before his second game. His cup debut was in the Football League Cup against Rotherham United on 16 October 1962. Bovington made a total of 138 League appearances for West Ham, scoring a single league goal (against Nottingham Forest on 26 October 1966 at Upton Park). He made another 46 senior appearances for the Hammers in other competitions, including the 1964 FA Cup Final and eight European Cup Winners Cup matches. His only cup goal was against Cardiff City, in a 5–2 home win on 20 December 1965 in the League Cup semi-final.

He retired from football, aged 28, to join the rag trade. He later became a keen marathon runner and member of Woodford Green Athletics Club. Bovington later recalled that he had had a poor relationship with manager, Ron Greenwood and that Greenwood had failed to pick Bovington for the team as he thought he was not good enough.

== Career statistics ==
Appearances and goals by club, season and competition
Club	Season	League			FA Cup		League Cup		ECWC		Other		Total	
Club	Season	Division	Apps	Goals	Apps	Goals	Apps	Goals	Apps	Goals	Apps	Goals	Apps	Goals
West Ham United
West Ham United	1959–60	First Division	1	0	0	0	0	0	0	0	0	0	1	0
West Ham United	1961–62	First Division	7	0	0	0	0	0	0	0	0	0	7	0
West Ham United	1962–63	First Division	10	0	4	0	1	0	0	0	0	0	15	0
West Ham United	1963–64	First Division	22	0	7	0	3	0	0	0	0	0	32	0
West Ham United	1964–65	First Division	33	0	2	0	1	0	4	0	1 (Note: Appearance in the FA Charity Shield)	0	41	0
West Ham United	1965–66	First Division	31	0	4	0	9	1	4	0	0	0	48	1
West Ham United	1966–67	First Division	28	1	2	0	4	0	0	0	0	0	34	1
West Ham United	1967–68	First Division	6	0	0	0	0	0	0	0	0	0	6	0
Career total			138	1	19	0	18	1	8	0	1	0	184	2

== Honours ==
West Ham United

- FA Cup: 1963–64
- FA Charity Shield: 1964
- Football League Cup runner-up: 1965–66
