= 1964 FA Charity Shield =

- Event: FA Charity Shield
Liverpool	West Ham United
2	2
- Date: 15 August 1964
- Venue: Anfield, Liverpool
- Referee: Ken Stokes
- Attendance: 38,858

The 1964 FA Charity Shield was the 42nd FA Charity Shield, an annual football match played between the winners of the previous season's First Division and FA Cup competitions. The match was played on 15 August 1964 at Anfield, Liverpool and contested by Liverpool, who had won the 1963–64 First Division, and West Ham United, who had won the 1964 FA Cup Final. The teams played out a 2–2 draw and shared the Charity Shield.

== Match details ==
15 August 1964
15:00 BST

Liverpool	2–2	West Ham United
Wallace 29'; G.Byrne 49'	Report	J.Byrne 41'; Hurst 84'

Anfield, Liverpool
Attendance: 38,858
Referee: K. Stokes

Liverpool	West Ham United

GK	1	(Scotland) Tommy Lawrence
RB	2	(England) Gerry Byrne
LB	3	(England) Ronnie Moran
RH	4	(England) Gordon Milne
CH	5	(Scotland) Ron Yeats (c)
LH	6	(Scotland) Willie Stevenson
OR	7	(England) Ian Callaghan
IR	8	(England) Roger Hunt
CF	9	(England) Alf Arrowsmith (substituted off) 15'
IL	10	(Scotland) Gordon Wallace
OL	11	(England) Peter Thompson
Substitute:
FW	12	(England) Phil Chisnall (substituted on) 15'
Manager:
(Scotland) Bill Shankly

GK	1	(England) Jim Standen
RB	2	(England) John Bond
LB	3	(England) Jack Burkett
RH	4	(England) Eddie Bovington
CH	5	(England) Ken Brown
LH	6	(England) Bobby Moore (c)
OR	7	(England) Peter Brabrook
IR	8	(England) Ronnie Boyce
CF	9	(England) Johnny Byrne
IL	10	(England) Geoff Hurst
OL	11	(England) John Sissons
Substitutes:
FW	12	(England) Martin Peters
Manager:
(England) Ron Greenwood

Match rules

- 90 minutes, no extra time
- One named substitute
- Maximum of one substitution

== See also ==
- 1963–64 Football League
- 1963–64 FA Cup
