= Vic Keeble =

English footballer (1930–2018)

- Keeble at West Ham United

Personal information
- Full name: Victor Albert Williams Keeble
- Date of birth: 25 June 1930
- Place of birth: Colchester, England
- Date of death: 29 January 2018 (aged 87)
- Place of death: Essex, England
- Height: 6 ft 0 in (1.83 m)
- Position: Centre-forward

Youth career
- Arsenal
- King George V Boys Club
- Colchester Casuals

Senior career*
| Years | Team | Apps | (Gls) |
| 1947–1952 | Colchester United | 115 | (82) |
| 1952–1957 | Newcastle United | 104 | (56) |
| 1957–1960 | West Ham United | 76 | (45) |
| Total | | 295 | (183) |
- * Club domestic league appearances and goals

Victor Albert Williams Keeble (25 June 1930 – 29 January 2018) was an English footballer who played as a centre-forward for Colchester United, Newcastle United and West Ham United.

== Early life ==
Victor Albert Williams Keeble was born 25 June 1930 to Victor Keeble (1907-1977) and Minnie Rose Warner. Keeble attended Colchester Royal Grammar School, where his preferred sport was rugby, playing as a stand-off half. He played football with Arsenal as a schoolboy and locally for King George V Boys Club and Colchester Casuals.

== Career ==
=== Colchester United ===
Keeble was signed as an amateur for hometown club Colchester United by future West Ham United manager Ted Fenton in May 1947, a few weeks short of his 17th birthday. The club paid a £10 signing-on fee for his services. He had an instant impact, scoring hat-tricks on his debuts in the Eastern Counties League, against Norwich City A, and in the Southern League against Bedford Town in the first game of the 1947–48 season. His goals at Colchester earned him a place in the Southern League representative side.

He scored 59 goals in 69 Southern League appearances for Colchester United, and went on to score a further 23 goals in 46 Football League appearances after the club were elected to the Third Division South for the first time.

=== Newcastle United ===
He was signed by Newcastle United for £15,000 in January 1952 after being spotted by Magpies scout and former captain Bill McCracken. He continued to score goals, with three in his five appearances in 1951–52. However, Keeble's move to Newcastle coincided with his National Service with the Army, and long periods away impeded his progress.

Keeble's first full season at Newcastle began with a 4–2 loss in the Charity Shield against Manchester United. He scored both goals for the Magpies. The 1952–53 season continued with 6 goals in 17 First Division appearances, and he managed 6 in 11 the following season.

By 1955, with Army duties completed, Keeble was back to his best, scoring 29 goals in 36 appearances during the 1955–56 season. One game against Huddersfield Town in November 1955 saw Keeble score four. He was the last surviving member of the team that beat Manchester City in the 1955 FA Cup Final, and has a road named after him in North Seaton, Ashington. The competition had seen Keeble score five goals in preceding rounds, and he wore Jackie Milburn's number 9 shirt in the Final (Milburn wore number 8).

An injury in 1956–57 saw Keeble lose his place in the team to Len White and the following season he played mainly for the reserve team. He left having scored 67 goals in his 120 League and FA Cup games for the club.

=== West Ham United ===
Signed again by Fenton, Keeble moved to Upton Park in October 1957 for £10,000, joining a West Ham side that had earned 12 points from their first 12 Second Division games of 1957–58, with inside-forward John Dick yet to score in the League. They went on to form a partnership that produced a combined 40 goals. Keeble finished the season with 19 League goals in 29 games, which, along with Dick's 21, contributed to a first-place finish and promotion to the First Division.

Keeble had made his debut for the Irons in a friendly fixture, a testimonial for Dick Walker against Sparta Rotterdam. He scored the first goal in a game that saw Dick score a hat-trick. He scored on his League debut, against Doncaster Rovers on 19 October 1957, and scored the first of three hat-tricks for West Ham on 16 November, against Stoke City. His partnership with Dick would yield 20 goals by Christmas Day and see the Hammers placed third in the league table. Consistent goalscoring from both players continued into the second half of the season, culminating in a crucial final game, against Middlesbrough, that saw the pair both cap their title-winning season with goals.

The 1958–59 campaign saw Keeble score 21 top-flight goals, including four in a 6–3 win over Blackburn Rovers, even though he had missed the final two months of the season due to injury. West Ham finished sixth, at that point the club's highest ever finish.

In April 1959, Keeble and teammate Malcolm Musgrove played for a Football Combination representative side against a Select Dutch XI in Amsterdam.

The 1959–60 season would prove to be his last as a player. He made 15 league appearances, scoring six goals, but was forced to retire, aged 29, due to a back injury. His final game came against Leeds United on 16 January 1960.

Keeble made a total of 84 League and FA Cup appearances for West Ham and scored 51 goals.

== Style of play ==
Keeble was renowned for his ability to score goals from the air. His headed goals prompted Jackie Milburn to once comment: "Vic scored so many goals with his nut that I swear he had studs in his forehead". His tendency to score goals with his head, rather than his feet, also earned him the moniker 'Feeble Keeble' while at Newcastle.

West Ham teammate Malcolm Pyke, discussing Keeble in later life, pointed to some of his other attributes: "Ted Fenton bought Vic Keeble from Newcastle because he thought he could be good in the air, which he was. But what he didn't recognise was what a good target man Vic was. We could play balls from defence into Vic Keeble and he would hold them in to himself or knock them off. He brought Jackie Dick into the play a lot more, got more out of Jackie Dick, and made more use of the wingers in terms of crosses".

== After football ==
After retirement, Keeble moved back to north Essex and worked as a football reporter. He remained active, winning medals in local table tennis competitions in the late 1960s.

He later returned to Colchester United as commercial manager. In the late 1970s, he joined Chelmsford City, initially working as an administrator. He went on to become the club's general manager and secretary.

His son, Chris Keeble, also played professionally for Colchester United.

He died in January 2018, at the age of 87, by which time he was the last surviving member of Newcastle's FA Cup winning sides of the 1950s.

== Career statistics ==
Appearances and goals by club, season and competition
| Club | Season | League | | | FA Cup | | Other | | Total | |
| Club | Season | Division | Apps | Goals | Apps | Goals | Apps | Goals | Apps | Goals |
|---|---|---|---|---|---|---|---|---|---|---|
| Colchester United | 1947–48 | Southern League | 12 | 8 | — | | 3 (Note: Appearances in the Southern League Cup) | 1 | 15 | 9 |
| Colchester United | 1948–49 | Southern League | 12 | 8 | — | | 3 (Note: Includes the Southern League Cup Final carried over from 1947 to 1948) | 1 | 15 | 9 |
| Colchester United | 1949–50 | Southern League | 45 | 43 | 1 | 0 | 5 | 4 | 51 | 47 |
| Colchester United | 1950–51 | Third Division South | 21 | 7 | — | | — | | 21 | 7 |
| Colchester United | 1951–52 | Third Division South | 25 | 16 | 3 | 1 | — | | 28 | 17 |
| Colchester United | Total | | 115 | 82 | 4 | 1 | 11 | 6 | 130 | 89 |
| Newcastle United | 1951–52 | First Division | 5 | 3 | — | | — | | 5 | 3 |
| Newcastle United | 1952–53 | First Division | 17 | 6 | 2 | 2 | 1 (Note: Appearance in the FA Charity Shield) | 2 | 20 | 10 |
| Newcastle United | 1953–54 | First Division | 11 | 6 | 1 | 1 | — | | 12 | 7 |
| Newcastle United | 1954–55 | First Division | 19 | 10 | 9 | 5 | — | | 28 | 15 |
| Newcastle United | 1955–56 | First Division | 32 | 26 | 4 | 3 | — | | 36 | 29 |
| Newcastle United | 1956–57 | First Division | 14 | 4 | — | | — | | 14 | 4 |
| Newcastle United | 1957–58 | First Division | 6 | 1 | — | | — | | 6 | 1 |
| | Total | | 104 | 56 | 16 | 11 | 1 | 2 | 121 | 69 |
| West Ham United | 1957–58 | Second Division | 29 | 19 | 3 | 4 | 1 (Note: Appearances in the Southern Floodlight Cup) | 1 | 33 | 24 |
| West Ham United | 1958–59 | First Division | 32 | 20 | 1 | 0 | 2 | 1 | 35 | 21 |
| West Ham United | 1959–60 | First Division | 15 | 6 | — | | 1 | 0 | 16 | 6 |
| West Ham United | Total | | 76 | 45 | 4 | 4 | 4 | 2 | 84 | 51 |
| Career total | | | 295 | 183 | 24 | 16 | 16 | 10 | 335 | 209 |

== Honours ==
Colchester United

- Southern Football League Cup: 1949–50; runner-up: 1947–48, 1948–49
- Southern Football League runner-up: 1949–50

Newcastle United

- FA Cup: 1954–55

West Ham United

- Football League Second Division: 1957–58

Individual

- Colchester United Hall of Fame inductee: 2007–08
