= Johnny Byrne (footballer) =

English footballer (1939–1999)

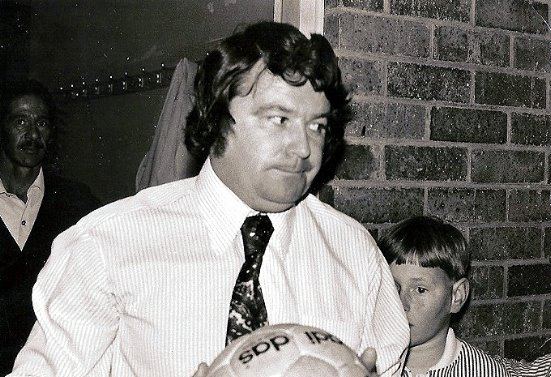
- Byrne pictured in Cape Town, South Africa, in the early 1970s.

Personal information
- Full name: John Joseph Byrne
- Date of birth: 13 May 1939
- Place of birth: West Horsley, Surrey, England
- Date of death: 27 October 1999 (aged 60)
- Place of death: Cape Town, South Africa
- Height: 5 ft 9 in (1.74 m)
- Position: Striker

Youth career
- Epsom Town
- Guildford City
- Crystal Palace

Senior career*
Years	Team	Apps	(Gls)
1956–1962	Crystal Palace	203	(85)
1962–1967	West Ham United	156	(79)
1967–1968	Crystal Palace	36	(5)
1968–1969	Fulham	19	(2)
1969–1973	Durban City	69	(22)
1980	Hellenic	1	(0)
Total		484	(193)

International career
1961–1962	England under-23	7	(4)
1961–1965	England	11	(8)
- * Club domestic league appearances and goals

John Joseph Byrne (13 May 1939 – 27 October 1999) was an English professional footballer who played as a striker. He was nicknamed "Budgie" due to his constant chattering.

He played non-league football for Epsom Town and Guildford City Youth, before signing a professional contract with Crystal Palace in 1956. He joined West Ham United in 1962, and spent the next five years with the "Hammers". He returned to Crystal Palace in 1967, before joining Fulham the following year. He emigrated to South Africa in 1969 and spent four years with Durban City. He went on to coach in South Africa for many years, and turned out as a player for Hellenic in 1980.

He won seven caps for the England under-23 team, before scoring eight goals in eleven full England internationals between 1961 and 1965.

== Early life ==
John Joseph Byrne was born in West Horsley, Surrey, to Irish immigrants on 13 May 1939 and he attended nearby Howard of Effingham School As a youth player he represented Epsom Town and Guildford City Youth, though it was Vincent Blore, a former Crystal Palace and West Ham United player, who alerted Crystal Palace manager Cyril Spiers to Byrne's talents. Whilst working as an apprentice toolmaker at the age of 15, Byrne attended four trials at Selhurst Park before being signed onto the ground staff.

== Club career ==
=== Crystal Palace ===
Byrne made 14 appearances for Crystal Palace during the 1956–57 season, scoring once as the "Glaziers" finished 20th in the Third Division South. He signed a professional contract on his 17th birthday in 1956, and made his debut in October of that year. He scored seven times in 28 matches in the 1957–58 season, as Palace finished in 14th place. He scored 17 goals in 45 matches in the 1958–59 season, in which the club became founder members of the Fourth Division and new manager George Smith led the "Glaziers" to a seventh-place finish. In 1959–60 Byrne scored 16 times in 42 matches as Palace finished eighth in Division Four. He requested a transfer, and an asking price of £20,000 was demanded by the club. On 15 October 1959, he scored two goals as Palace recorded a club record 9–0 victory over Barrow.

After a steady first two seasons, Byrne became a first team regular, and was popular with the Palace fans. In the 1960–61 season, Byrne scored 30 of Palace's 110 goals (his strike partner Roy Summersby netted 25), as Palace reached the Third Division. He left Palace having scored 96 goals, then a post-war record.

=== West Ham United ===
Following this, he did not stay a Third Division player for long, and the First Division beckoned, as Ron Greenwood paid a Second Division British record transfer fee of £65,000 to take "Budgie" to West Ham United in 1962. Greenwood would later compare Byrne with Argentine footballer, Alfredo Di Stéfano. The fee being made up of £58,000 plus ex-Palace striker Ron Brett who was valued at £7,000. Byrne's debut came on 17 March 1962 in a 0–0 draw at Hillsborough against Sheffield Wednesday. He played eleven games in his first season, scoring a single goal, in a 4–1 home win against Cardiff City, in April 1962.

The 1962–63 season saw him score 14 goals in all competitions, only one behind leading scorer Geoff Hurst. In the 1963–64 season he beat Bobby Moore, who finished second, to the "Hammer of the Year" award for the season, as West Ham won the FA Cup. Byrne had amassed 33 goals from 45 games in all competitions for this season overtaking Hurst as top goalscorer. This included FA Cup goals in the fourth round against Leyton Orient, the fifth round against Swindon Town and two in the sixth round against Burnley.

The 1964–65 season saw West Ham playing in both the 1964 Charity Shield and in European football having won the previous year's FA Cup. West Ham and 1963–64 league champions, Liverpool, shared the Charity Shield having drawn the game at Anfield, 2–2 with Byrne scoring one of the West Ham goals. In Europe West Ham competed in the 1964–65 European Cup Winners' Cup. Byrne scored in the first round against La Gantoise, the third round against Lausanne and a goal in the semi-finals against Real Zaragoza. Unfortunately, for Byrne, he was injured in the England-Scotland match a few weeks earlier and did not play in the final against Munich 1860 at Wembley Stadium which West Ham won 2–0

In the 1965–66 season West Ham were again in European football as holders of the Cup Winners' Cup. They also reached the 1966 League Cup Final. Again Byrne was on the scoresheet in the Cup Winners' Cup, in the second round against Olympiacos, the third round against Magedeburg and in the semi-final against Borussia Dortmund where they were eliminated from the competition. He scored five goals in six games in the League Cup including one in the first-leg of the final against West Bromwich Albion which West Ham won 2–1. Albion won the second leg, at The Hawthorns, 4–1 to take the trophy by an aggregate score of 5–3. Byrne finished the season with 17 goals in all competitions, someway behind Geoff Hurst, who, on the verge of his 1966 World Cup victory, scored 40 goals in 59 games.

=== Return to Crystal Palace ===
Byrne left West Ham in February 1967, returning to Crystal Palace for £45,000. scoring one goal (14 appearances) in his first season back and four goals in 22 appearances in 1967–68. This took his total for Palace to over 100 goals putting him 4th on Palace's all-time scorers list at the time. Palace were now in the Second Division but Byrne was past his peak as a player, and after only a year with the club was transferred to Fulham for £25,000 in March 1968.

=== Fulham ===
Byrne's time at Fulham, was largely the unsuccessful, as the club suffered relegation in both 1968 and 1969, leaving it in the Third Division. Byrne played only 19 games, (some of them at half-back) scoring twice, in that time, before signing for Durban City, in June 1969.

=== South Africa ===
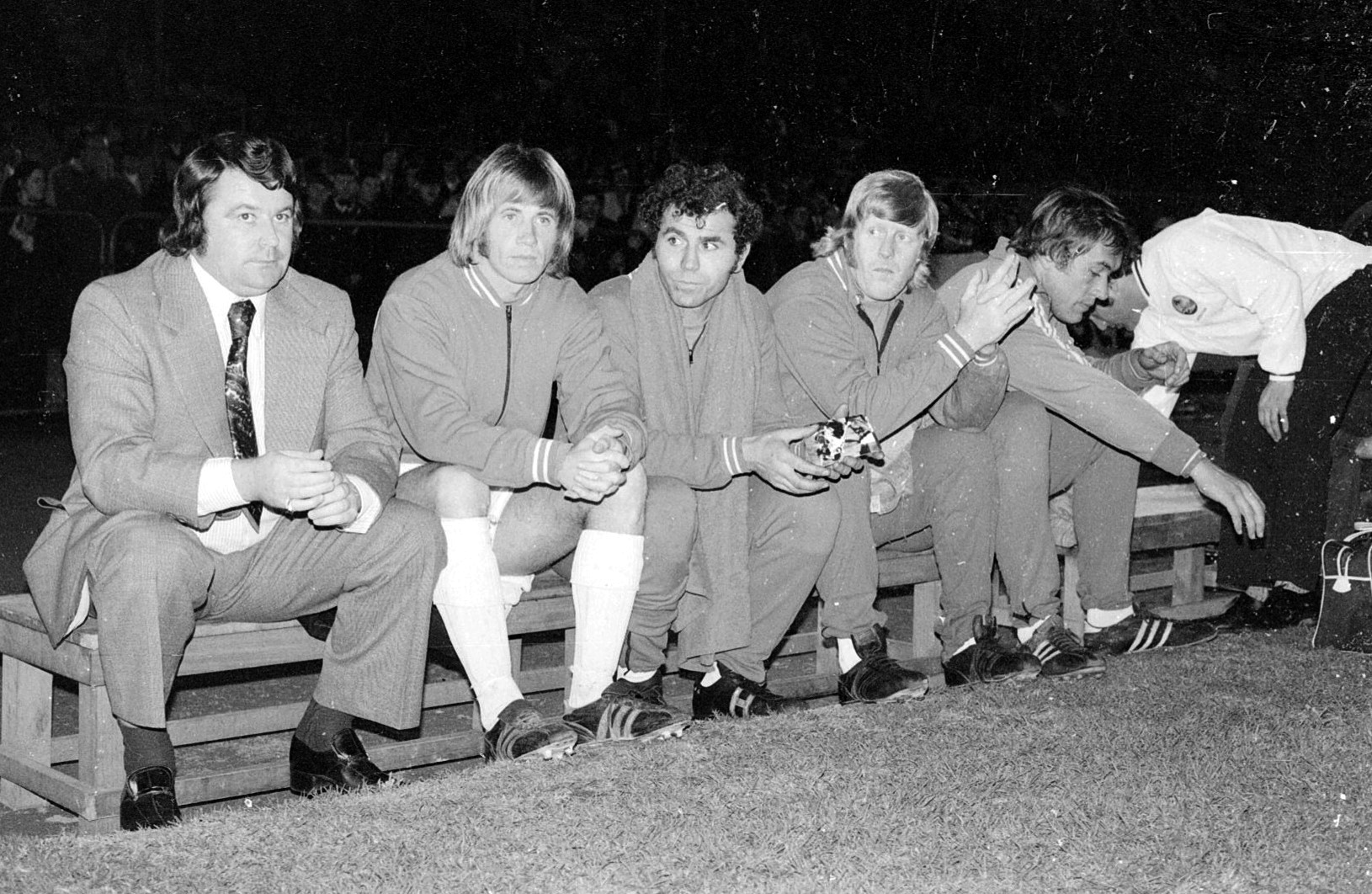
Manager Johnny 'Budgie' Byrne, and players on the bench of Hellenic FC of Cape Town, South Africa, early 1970s (Photo: Hilton Teper)

Byrne played for Fulham for only one full season before moving to South Africa, to play for the now defunct Durban City, alongside some of his former Fulham teammates, such as Johnny Haynes.

He became manager of Durban City, but spent most of his coaching career at Cape Town club Hellenic FC. He even played for them during an injury crisis in 1980, coming on as a late substitute in a league match against Johannesburg club Dynamos just short of his 41st birthday. He also coached at Cape Town Spurs and for Michau Warriors in Port Elizabeth. Spurs was his last job in 1998.

== International career ==
Byrne played for England at both youth and under-23 levels. He became the first Fourth Division player to win a cap for the under-23 side.

In November 1961 Byrne was called up to the England team, despite playing outside the top two divisions at the time, one of only five post-war players to achieve this. Byrne played the whole of the 1–1 draw against Northern Ireland, part of the 1962 British Home Championship, at Wembley Stadium.

He was a strong candidate to be selected for the 1962 FIFA World Cup in Chile, but he was shunned by the Football Association's selectors after getting involved in a confrontation with former England favourite Don Howe in a league match at The Hawthorns.

He got his first (and second) England goal in the 1–8 win over Switzerland. On 16 May 1964, possibly Byrne's greatest achievement came, as he scored a hat-trick, in Lisbon, in England's 4–3 win over a Portugal team that included Eusébio. He missed out on a place in the eventually victorious England squad, at the 1966 FIFA World Cup.

== Personal life ==
Byrne married Margaret when he was 18 years old.

He died suddenly following a heart attack in Cape Town on 27 October 1999, aged 60.

His son Mark played for Hellenic and Cape Town Spurs. Later he was president of Hellenic. He died in 2021.

== Career statistics ==
=== Club ===
Appearances and goals by club, season and competition
Club	Season	League			FA Cup		League Cup		Other		Total	
Club	Season	Division	Apps	Goals	Apps	Goals	Apps	Goals	Apps	Goals	Apps	Goals
Crystal Palace	1956–57	Third Division (S)	14	1	0	0	-	-	-	-	14	1
Crystal Palace	1957–58	Third Division (S)	28	7	1	0	-	-	-	-	29	7
Crystal Palace	1958–59	Fourth Division	45	17	5	3	-	-	-	-	50	20
Crystal Palace	1959–60	Fourth Division	42	16	4	3	-	-	-	-	46	19
Crystal Palace	1960–61	Fourth Division	42	30	3	1	1	0	-	-	45	31
Crystal Palace	1961–62	Third Division	32	14	3	3	1	0	-	-	36	17
Total			203	85	16	10	2	0	-	-	221	18
West Ham United	1961–62	First Division	11	1	-	-	-	-	-	-	11	1
West Ham United	1962–63	First Division	30	9	5	2	2	3	-	-	37	14
West Ham United	1963–64	First Division	33	24	7	4	5	5	-	-	45	33
West Ham United	1964–65	First Division	34	25	2	1	1	0	8 (Note: Appearance in Charity Shield) (Note: Appearances in UEFA Cup Winners' Cup)	4	45	30
West Ham United	1965–66	First Division	23	9	3	0	6	5	5	3	37	17
West Ham United	1966–67	First Division	25	11	1	0	5	2	-	-	31	13
Total			156	79	18	7	19	15	13	7	253	114
Crystal Palace	1966–67	Second Division	14	1	-	-	-	-	-	-	14	1
Crystal Palace	1967–68	Second Division	22	4	2	1	1	0	-	-	25	5
Total			36	5	2	1	1	0	-	-	39	3
Fulham	1967–68	First Division	4+1	0	-	-	-	-	-	-	4+1	0
Fulham	1968–69	Second Division	12+1	2	-	-	-	-	—	—	12+1	2
Total			16+2	2	0	0	0	0	0	0	16+2	2
Career total			411+2	171	36	18	22	15	13	7	482+2	211

=== International ===
Appearances and goals by national team and year
National team	Year	Apps	Goals
England	1961	1	0
England	1962	0	0
England	1963	1	2
England	1964	8	6
England	1965	1	0
Total		11	8

Scores and results list England's goal tally first, score column indicates score after each Byrne goal.

List of international goals scored by Johnny Byrne
No.	Date	Venue	Opponent	Score	Result	Competition
1	5 June 1963	St. Jakob Stadium, Basel, Switzerland	Switzerland	2-0	8-1	Friendly
2	5 June 1963	St. Jakob Stadium, Basel, Switzerland	Switzerland	4-1	8-1	Friendly
3	6 May 1964	Wembley Stadium, London, England	Uruguay	1-0	2–1	Friendly
4	6 May 1964	Wembley Stadium, London, England	Uruguay	2-0	2–1	Friendly
5	17 May 1964	Estádio Nacional, Lisbon, Portugal	Portugal	2–1	4-3	Friendly
6	17 May 1964	Estádio Nacional, Lisbon, Portugal	Portugal	3-3	4-3	Friendly
7	17 May 1964	Estádio Nacional, Lisbon, Portugal	Portugal	4-3	4-3	Friendly
8	24 May 1964	Dalymount Park, Dublin, Eire	Republic of Ireland	2-0	3-1	Friendly

== Honours ==
West Ham United

- FA Cup: 1963–64
- FA Charity Shield: 1964
- Football League Cup runner-up: 1965–66

== Sources ==
- Belton, Brian (2004), Burn Budgie Byrne: Football Inferno, Breedon Books, ISBN 1-85983-392-6
