= John Sissons (footballer) =

English footballer

Personal information
- Full name: John Leslie Sissons
- Date of birth: 30 September 1945 (age 81)
- Place of birth: Hayes, Middlesex, England
- Position: Forward

Youth career
- 1961–1963: West Ham United

Senior career*
Years	Team	Apps	(Gls)
1963–1970	West Ham United	213	(37)
1970–1974	Sheffield Wednesday	115	(14)
1974	Norwich City	17	(2)
1974–1975	Chelsea	11	(0)
1975	→ Tampa Bay Rowdies (loan)	19	(5)
1976–1978	Cape Town City		
Total		375	(72)

International career
- England Schools
- England Youth
	England U23	10	(0)
- * Club domestic league appearances and goals

John Leslie Sissons (born 30 September 1945) is an English former professional footballer who played as a forward for West Ham United, Sheffield Wednesday, Norwich City and Chelsea.

== Career ==
Sissons started his career as an apprentice for West Ham United in 1961. He joined the club along with Peter Bennett after the pair were spotted by scout Charlie Faulkner while playing for Middlesex Schoolboys. He played for England Youth in the 1964 UEFA European Under-18 Championship and scored the fourth goal in the Final, a 4–0 win over Spain at the Olympic Stadium in Amsterdam.

He had played as an inside-left for Middlesex and England Schoolboys, but was moved to outside-left by Hammers manager Ron Greenwood. He made his senior debut for the east London club on 4 May 1963, a home game against Blackburn Rovers. Sissons became the youngest player to score in an FA Cup Final at Wembley, in May 1964, and second youngest to appear, behind his Preston North End counterpart Howard Kendall. He went on to play 213 league (37 goals) and 52 cup (16 goals) games for West Ham.

Sissons moved to Wednesday in 1970 for £60,000. He made 115 league appearances for the club, scoring 14 goals, before moving to Norwich City, where he rejoined former teammate John Bond.

Chelsea signed Sissons for £70,000 from Norwich in August 1974. He made his debut on 17 August 1974 in a 2–0 home defeat by Carlisle United. He made 11 appearances during the 1974–75 season but failed to establish himself in a struggling Chelsea side who were relegated at the end of the season. In March 1975, he joined up with North American Soccer League club Tampa Bay Rowdies. He was part of the championship-winning team which featured other English exports Clyde Best, Stewart Jump, Stewart Scullion, Paul Hammond and Mark Lindsay.

After his release from Chelsea, Sissons emigrated to South Africa and finished his career with two seasons at Cape Town City.

== Career statistics ==
Appearances and goals by club, season and competition
Club	Season	League			FA Cup		League Cup		Europe		Other		Total	
Club	Season	Division	Apps	Goals	Apps	Goals	Apps	Goals	Apps	Goals	Apps	Goals	Apps	Goals
West Ham United	1962–63	First Division	1	0	0	0	0	0	—		—		1	0
West Ham United	1963–64	First Division	14	3	7	3	1	0	—		—		22	6
West Ham United	1964–65	First Division	38	8	2	1	1	0	9	2	1 (Note: Appearance in Charity Shield)	0	51	11
West Ham United	1965–66	First Division	36	5	2	1	9	1	4	1	—		51	8
West Ham United	1966–67	First Division	35	7	2	1	6	3	—		—		43	11
West Ham United	1967–68	First Division	37	8	3	2	2	0	—		—		42	10
West Ham United	1968–69	First Division	32	4	1	0	2	1	—		—		35	5
West Ham United	1969–70	First Division	20	2	1	0	0	0	—		—		21	2
West Ham United	Total		213	37	18	8	21	5	13	3	1	0	266	53
Sheffield Wednesday	1970–71	Second Division	36	3	0	0	1	0	—		—		37	3
Sheffield Wednesday	1971–72	Second Division	41	8	1	0	2	1	—		—		44	9
Sheffield Wednesday	1972–73	Second Division	32	3	5	0	2	0	—		—		39	3
Sheffield Wednesday	1973–74	Second Division	6	0	0	0	0	0	—		—		6	0
Sheffield Wednesday	Total		115	14	6	0	5	1	—		—		126	15
Norwich City	1973–74	Second Division	17	2	0	0	3	1	0	0	0	0	20	3
Norwich City	1974–75	First Division	0	0	0	0	0	0	0	0	1 (Note: Appearance in Texaco Cup)	0	1	0
Norwich City	Total		17	2	0	0	3	1	0	0	1	0	21	3
Chelsea	1974–75	First Division	11	0	1	0	1	0	—		—		13	0
Tampa Bay Rowdies	1975	NASL	19	5	—		—		—		—		19	5
Career total			375	58	25	8	30	7	13	3	2	0	445	76

== Honours ==
West Ham United

- FA Cup: 1963–64
- FA Charity Shield: 1964
- European Cup Winners' Cup: 1964–65
- Football League Cup runner-up: 1965–66
