= Jim Smith (footballer, born 1937) =

Scottish footballer

Personal information
- Full name: James Alexander Grant Smith
- Date of birth: 16 October 1937
- Place of birth: Arbroath, Scotland
- Date of death: 10 April 2002 (aged 64)
- Position: Central defender

Senior career*
Years	Team	Apps	(Gls)
1956–1969	Preston North End	314	(13)
1969–1972	Stockport County	78	(2)
Total		392	(15)
- * Club domestic league appearances and goals

James Alexander Grant Smith (16 October 1937 – 10 April 2002) was a Scottish footballer who played as a central defender for Preston North End and Stockport County.

Smith was signed by Preston from his hometown club in 1956, making his first-team debut in the 1958-59 season.

Smith played in the 1964 FA Cup final.

== Honours ==
Preston North End

- FA Cup runner-up: 1963–64
