= Malcolm Pyke =

English footballer (1938–2020)

Personal information
- Date of birth: 6 March 1938
- Place of birth: Eltham, London, England
- Date of death: 13 February 2020 (aged 81)
- Position: Wing half

Youth career
- 1953–1954: UGB Pantiles
- 1953–1957: West Ham United

Senior career*
Years	Team	Apps	(Gls)
1957–1959	West Ham United	17	(0)
1959–1960	Crystal Palace	2	(0)
1960–?	Dartford		
- * Club domestic league appearances and goals

Malcolm Pyke (6 March 1938 – 13 February 2020) was an English footballer who played as a wing half in the Football League for West Ham United and Crystal Palace. He later played for Dartford.

== Playing career ==
Born in Eltham, London, Pyke played for Woolwich, Kent and London as a schoolboy. He played for UGB Pantiles, a club based in Blackheath which was associated with the United Glass Bottle company, during the 1953–54 season.

He joined West Ham United as part of the ground staff in 1953 and progressed as a youth team player. He signed professional forms in March 1955. He made his first team debut on 22 April 1957 in a 3–1 home win against Bristol City, and he kept in place for the following match, a 1–0 away defeat to Liverpool.

Pyke was a member of Ted Fenton's side which won the 1957–58 Second Division. He was drafted into the team after Malcolm Allison contracted tuberculosis in September 1957, playing alongside Ken Brown and sharing the number 6 shirt with Bill Lansdowne. His run in the team included an FA Cup third-round match against a Blackpool side which featured Stanley Matthews, with Pyke setting up a goal for John Dick in a 5–1 win. He made 21 competitive appearances that season, including 15 in the League.

He did not make any appearances the following season as West Ham returned to the 1958–59 First Division. He totalled 24 appearances (Note: 17 in the Second Division, 3 in the Southern Floodlight Cup, 2 in the Essex Professional Cup, and 2 in the FA Cup.) for "The Hammers" before moving to Crystal Palace on 9 June 1959 in exchange for Ron Brett. His Palace career was even shorter and amounted to only two games before he moved to Dartford, in June 1960.

== After football ==
When his football career ended Pyke became the landlord of the Papermakers Arms pub in Dartford, Kent. He died on 13 February 2020, aged 81.
