= Tony Singleton =

English footballer

Personal information
- Full name: Anthony Joseph Singleton
- Date of birth: 30 March 1936
- Place of birth: Preston, Lancashire, England
- Date of death: 29 February 2008 (aged 71)
- Position: Centre half

Senior career*
Years	Team	Apps	(Gls)
1960–1968	Preston North End	287	(0)
1968	New York Generals	12	(0)
Total		299	(0)
- * Club domestic league appearances and goals

Anthony Joseph "Tony" Singleton (30 March 1936 – 29 February 2008) was an English footballer who played as a centre half for Preston North End and New York Generals.

Singleton signed for his hometown club in May 1955, and made his first-team debut in 1960.

In the semi-final of Preston's run in the 1963–64, with the score level at 1–1 against Swansea City, Singleton scored a rare goal from 30 yards to win the game and send Preston to the final, where they lost to West Ham United.

== Honours ==
Preston North End

- FA Cup runner-up: 1963–64
