= Harry Obeney =

English footballer

Personal information
- Date of birth: 9 March 1938 (age 88)
- Place of birth: Bethnal Green, England
- Position: Forward

Youth career
- Brigg Sports

Senior career*
Years	Team	Apps	(Gls)
1956–1961	West Ham United	24	(12)
1961–1964	Millwall	76	(10)
- Colchester United
- Dover
1965–1973	Romford	280	(63)
- Aveley
- * Club domestic league appearances and goals

Harry Obeney (born 9 March 1938) is an English former professional footballer who played as a centre forward/wing half.

== Career ==
A full back with Briggs Sports, Obeney signed for West Ham United in 1956 and made his full professional appearance in 1957 in a game against Notts County. His next appearance came nearly two years later. In 1959, with West Ham seeking a replacement for the injured Vic Keeble, Obeney was converted to playing as a centre forward.

Making only 30 appearances, in all competitions, for The Hammers, including West Ham's record home win against Everton; a 4–0 win in February 1961 in which Obeney scored twice, he was allowed to leave and joined Millwall in 1961. He made 75 appearances for The Lions before a short spell with Colchester United, Southern League club Dover, before making over four hundred appearances for Romford. Obeney finished his career with Aveley.

Obeney was granted a testimonial by Romford against West Ham United on 21 October 1970.
