= Peter Shearing =

English footballer

Personal information
- Full name: Peter Fraser Shearing
- Date of birth: 26 August 1938 (age 88)
- Place of birth: Uxbridge, England
- Position: Goalkeeper

Senior career*
Years	Team	Apps	(Gls)
1960–1961	West Ham United	6	(0)
1961–1964	Portsmouth	17	(0)
1964–1966	Exeter City	80	(0)
1966–1968	Plymouth Argyle	24	(0)
1968–1971	Exeter City	79	(0)
1971	Bristol Rovers	0	(0)
1971–1973	Gillingham	39	(0)
Total		245	(0)
- * Club domestic league appearances and goals

Peter Fraser Shearing (born 26 August 1938) is an English former professional footballer who played as a goalkeeper. He played professionally for West Ham United, Portsmouth, Exeter City, Plymouth Argyle, Bristol Rovers and Gillingham between 1960 and 1973, and in total made 245 appearances in the Football League. He also won an FA Amateur Cup winners medal for Hendon in 1960.
