= Derek Woodley =

English footballer

Personal information
- Full name: Derek George Woodley
- Date of birth: 2 March 1942
- Place of birth: Isleworth, England
- Date of death: 2002 (aged 59–60)
- Place of death: Shoebury, England
- Position: Winger

Youth career
- West Ham United

Senior career*
Years	Team	Apps	(Gls)
1959–1962	West Ham United	12	(3)
1962–1967	Southend United	162	(23)
1967	Charlton Athletic	3	(0)
1967–1968	Southend United	9	(0)
1968–1971	Gillingham	100	(9)
1971	Folkestone		
1971–1972	Pegasus Athletic		
- * Club domestic league appearances and goals

Derek George Woodley (2 March 1942 – 2002) was an English footballer who played for West Ham United, Southend United, Charlton Athletic and Gillingham during a 12-year professional career.

== Playing career ==
Born in Isleworth, Woodley played for the England Schoolboys team during the 1950s, including scoring a goal against Wales in 1957 after just 13 seconds; it was the fastest goal scored in any competitive fixture at the original Wembley Stadium. In 1957, he joined West Ham United as a junior and later turned professional with the club. He found his first team opportunities limited, however, and moved on to Southend United in 1962. He made over 150 appearances for the Roots Hall club in two spells (separated by a brief stint with Charlton Athletic) before moving to Gillingham in 1968.

During his time at Priestfield Stadium he made exactly 100 Football League appearances, before leaving in 1971 to wind down his career with non-league clubs Folkestone and Pegasus Athletic.

== Later life ==
In later years Woodley lived in Felixstowe and Shoebury. He died in January 2002, with former England star Martin Peters attending his funeral.
