= Ron Brett =

English footballer (1937–1962)

Personal information
- Date of birth: 4 September 1937
- Place of birth: Stanford-le-Hope, England
- Date of death: 30 August 1962 (aged 24)
- Place of death: Clerkenwell, London, England
- Position: Forward

Youth career
- ?–1954: Crystal Palace

Senior career*
Years	Team	Apps	(Gls)
1955–1959	Crystal Palace	36	(12)
1959–1962	West Ham United	12	(4)
1962	Crystal Palace	8	(1)
Total		56	(17)
- * Club domestic league appearances and goals

Ron Brett (4 September 1937 – 30 August 1962) was an English professional footballer who played as a forward.

== Career ==
Brett started his career at Crystal Palace as a junior, signing professional terms in September 1954. He made his debut on 3 September 1955 in an away 1–1 draw against Millwall and went on to make 36 appearances for Palace, scoring 12 twelve goals. In June 1959, he moved to West Ham United, in a deal which saw Malcolm Pyke move the other way. Brett made 13 appearances in all competitions for West Ham between September 1959 and March 1962 before returning to Crystal Palace as part of the deal which saw Johnny Byrne move to "The Hammers". Five months after returning to Palace, Brett was killed when his car hit a lorry in Clerkenwell, London. The last match he played, just days before his death, was a reserve game between his two clubs, Crystal Palace and West Ham. At the time of his death, he had scored 13 goals in all competitions for Crystal Palace.
