= Alan Dickie =

English footballer

Personal information
- Date of birth: 30 January 1944 (age 82)
- Place of birth: Charlton, London, England
- Position: Goalkeeper

Youth career
- –1960: West Ham United

Senior career*
Years	Team	Apps	(Gls)
1960–66	West Ham United	12	(0)
1967–68	Coventry City	2	(0)
1968–69	Aldershot	7	(0)
- * Club domestic league appearances and goals as of 16:11, 13 February 2012 (UTC)

Alan Dickie (born 30 January 1944) is an English former footballer who played as a goalkeeper in England for West Ham United, Coventry City and Aldershot.

== Club career ==
Dickie started as an apprentice for West Ham United before signing as a professional in July 1960. He did not make his debut until April 1962 in a 1–0 away defeat to Bolton Wanderers As an understudy for Lawrie Leslie and Jim Standen, Dickie made only 15 appearances for West Ham in all competitions but was the backup goalkeeper during their 1964–65 European Cup Winners' Cup victory making one appearance in the First Round, Second-leg against La Gantoise. Moving to Coventry City on 9 March 1967 he played only two games before moving to Aldershot the following year.

== After football ==
Dickie joined the Metropolitan Police and later worked in the Coroner's Office at Queen Mary's Hospital in Sidcup, Kent.
