= Dave Dunmore =

English footballer (1934–2021)

Personal information
- Full name: David Gerald Ivor Dunmore
- Date of birth: 18 February 1934
- Place of birth: Whitehaven, Cumberland, England
- Date of death: 11 July 2021 (aged 87)
- Position: Forward

Youth career
- Cliftonville

Senior career*
Years	Team	Apps	(Gls)
1951–1953	York City	48	(25)
1953–1959	Tottenham Hotspur	75	(23)
1960-1961	West Ham United	36	(16)
1961–1964	Leyton Orient	147	(54)
1965–1967	York City	63	(13)
- Worcester City
- Wellington Town
- Bridlington Trinity
- Scarborough
- Sligo Rovers
- * Club domestic league appearances and goals

David Gerald Ivor Dunmore (18 February 1934 – 11 July 2021) was an English footballer who played as a forward.

== Career ==
Born in Whitehaven, Cumberland Dunmore first played for York City, before being sold to Tottenham Hotspur for £10,750 in February 1954, which was a record transfer fee received for York at the time. Dunmore had limited opportunities at Tottenham due to competition with Bobby Smith and his commitment to National Service, playing a total of 81 games and scoring 26 goals for the club in all competitions.

Dunmore joined West Ham United during the 1959–60 season in an exchange deal that saw Johnny Smith move in the other direction. He made his West Ham debut on 19 March 1960 against Blackburn Rovers, and went on to make 39 appearances for the club, scoring 18 goals. He played his last game for the Irons on 4 March 1961, a home defeat against West Bromwich Albion, and joined Leyton Orient. With Malcolm Graham, Dunmore was Orient's joint top scorer in their only season in the First Division.

He rejoined York City for the 1965–66 season and was part of the team that finished bottom of the Third Division. His second season back at the club, and his last in League football, saw the club finish 22nd of 24 teams in the Fourth Division. He then had spells in non-league football with Worcester City, Wellington Town, Bridlington Trinity and Scarborough, and in Ireland with Sligo Rovers.

He died on 11 July 2021, aged 87.
