= Malcolm Musgrove =

English footballer (1933–2007)

Personal information
- Full name: Malcolm Clarke Musgrove
- Date of birth: 8 July 1933
- Place of birth: Lynemouth, England
- Date of death: 14 September 2007 (aged 74)
- Place of death: Torquay, England
- Position: Left wing

Senior career*
Years	Team	Apps	(Gls)
1953–1962	West Ham United	283	(84)
1962–1966	Leyton Orient	83	(14)
Total		366	(98)

Managerial career
- 1973–1976: Torquay United
- 1977–1978: Connecticut Bicentennials
- 1978: Chicago Sting
- 1981–1984: Exeter City
- * Club domestic league appearances and goals

Malcolm Clarke Musgrove (8 July 1933 − 14 September 2007) was an English football player and manager.

Musgrove played for his local side, Lynemouth Colliery, before being called up for national service, which he served in the Royal Air Force. He played for a Forces team and also for Scottish junior side Sunnybank while in the RAF and joined West Ham United in December 1953.

At West Ham, he soon established himself as a left-winger, making his league debut in 1954 against Brentford. He went on to make 301 league and cup appearances for the Hammers before joining Leyton Orient as player-coach in December 1962. He became chairman of the Professional Footballers' Association in 1962 and remained in the post until his retirement as a player in 1966.

He left Orient in 1965 to coach Charlton Athletic under Bob Stokoe, from where he moved to Aston Villa in 1967. In late 1968, he joined Leicester City as assistant manager under former West Ham teammate Frank O'Farrell, taking them back to the top flight when they won the Division 2 Championship in 1970–71. When O'Farrell moved to Manchester United in June 1971, Musgrove followed, again taking an assistant manager's position. O'Farrell and Musgrove were both sacked by Manchester United in December 1972, after a disastrous 5–0 loss at Crystal Palace. In January 1973, Musgrove took the manager's job at Torquay United, a post that O'Farrell had held himself five years earlier.

He had little success at Torquay, with a highest league finish of 9th place in 1975–76 in his time at Plainmoor. He left Torquay in November 1976, to be replaced by O'Farrell, and the following year coached NASL side Connecticut Bicentennials. In 1978, he coached another NASL side, Chicago Sting and on his return to England sold insurance for a while before joining Exeter City as coach and physiotherapist. He was made redundant in 1984 and then took the post of physio for the Qatar FA in the Middle East.

On his return, two years later, he became coach/physio at Plymouth Argyle, where he stayed until joining former Hammer John Bond at Shrewsbury Town. There, he was part of the backroom staff when they won the Third Division title in 1993, before retiring in 1998.

On retiring, he moved back to Torquay with his wife, Jean, to be nearer their children, David, Martin & Allison, and grandchildren. Musgrove was already suffering the early stages of Alzheimer's disease, which was to eventually take his life on 14 September 2007.

== Honours ==
West Ham United

- Football League Second Division: 1957–58
