= Peter Brabrook =

English footballer

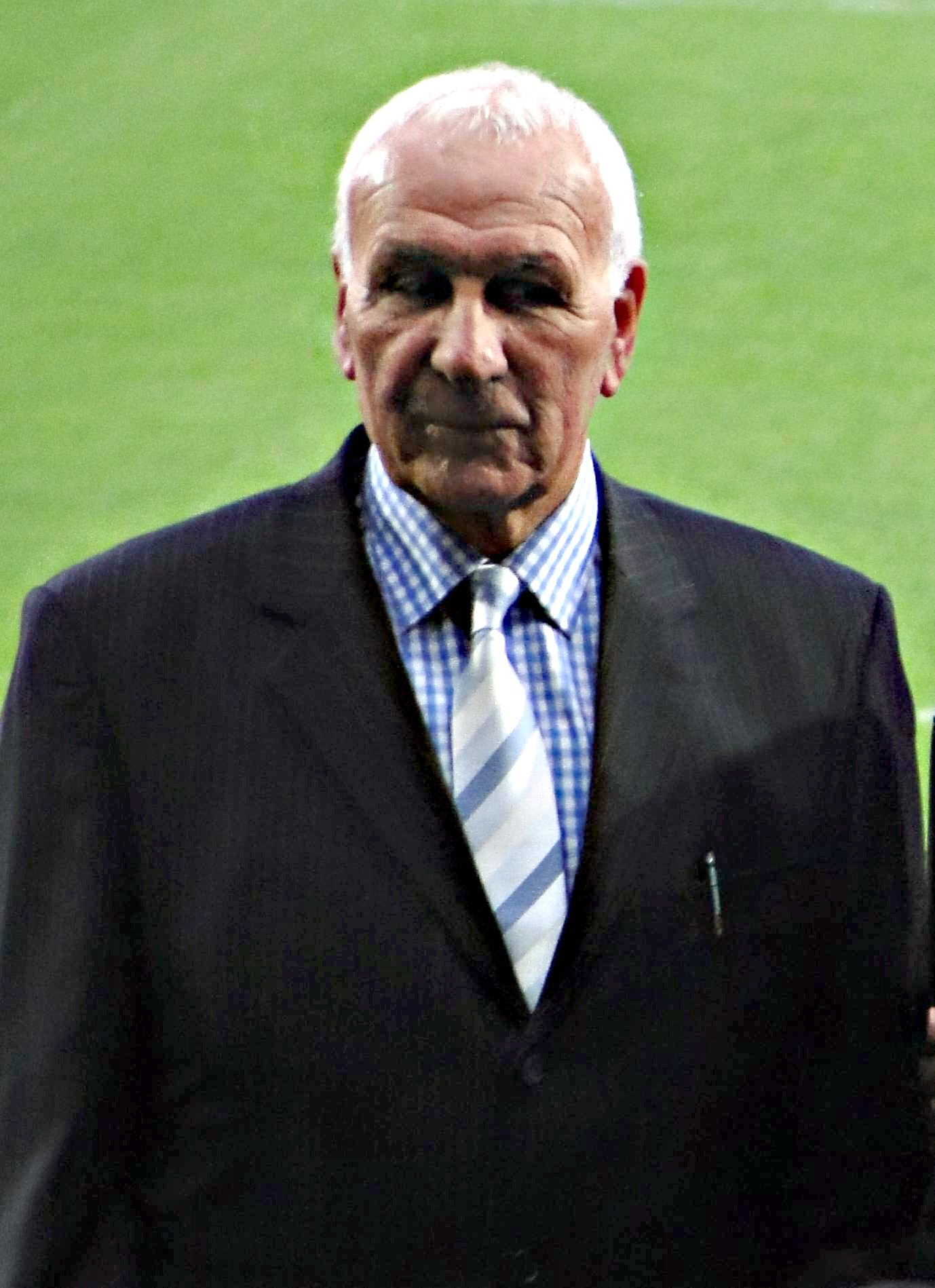
- Brabrook in May 2010

Personal information
- Date of birth: 8 November 1937
- Place of birth: Greenwich, England
- Date of death: 10 December 2016 (aged 79)
- Position: Winger

Youth career
- Ford United
- Chelsea

Senior career*
Years	Team	Apps	(Gls)
1954–1962	Chelsea	251	(47)
1962–1968	West Ham United	167	(33)
1968–1971	Orient	72	(6)
1971–1972	Romford	17	(1)
Total		507	(87)

International career
1957–1961	England U23	9	(1)
1958–1960	England	3	(0)
- * Club domestic league appearances and goals

Peter Brabrook (8 November 1937 – 10 December 2016) was an English footballer who made nearly 500 appearances in the Football League playing for Chelsea, West Ham United and Orient, and was capped three times for the England national team. He played as a winger.

== Career ==
Brabrook was born in Greenwich, London, and started his career at Ford United. He then moved on to Chelsea, making his debut during the 1954–55 season, during which the club won the league championship, though he only made three appearances. He established himself in the Chelsea first-team in the following years, making 271 appearances and scoring 57 goals in all competitions. Soon after Tommy Docherty took over as manager, Brabrook signed for West Ham United in 1962 for £35,000.

Alongside players such as Bobby Moore, Martin Peters and Geoff Hurst, Brabrook won the FA Cup and the Cup Winners' Cup with the club in consecutive seasons. He retired from playing after a stint with Orient and non-League Romford, and later returned to West Ham to take a role at their academy, helping to develop players such as Frank Lampard, Joe Cole and Michael Carrick.

He was capped three times for England, including a game against the USSR at the 1958 World Cup.

Brabrook died on 10 December 2016, aged 79.

== Honours ==
West Ham United

- FA Cup: 1963–64
- FA Charity Shield: 1964
- Football League Cup runner-up: 1965–66
