= Jack Burkett =

English footballer (born 1942)

Personal information
- Full name: Jack William Burkett
- Date of birth: 21 August 1942 (age 84)
- Place of birth: Edmonton, London, England
- Height: 5 ft 9 in (1.75 m)
- Position: Full-back

Youth career
- West Ham United

Senior career*
Years	Team	Apps	(Gls)
1958–1968	West Ham United	142	(4)
1968–1970	Charlton Athletic	8	(0)
1970–1971	Millwall	0	(0)
1970–1971	Southend United	0	(0)
1971–1975	St Patrick's Athletic	72	(7)
1975	Southend United	0	(0)
Total		222	(11)

Managerial career
- 1971–1975: St Patrick's Athletic
- Saudi Arabia U18
- Ørsta
- * Club domestic league appearances and goals

Jack William Burkett (born 21 August 1942) is an English former professional footballer who played as a full-back in the Football League for West Ham United and Charlton Athletic, and was player-manager at League of Ireland team St Patrick's Athletic.

== Career ==
Burkett started his career at West Ham United, joining the senior team in July 1958. He played in the FA Youth Cup Final of 1958–59 alongside Bobby Moore, Harry Cripps and Eddie Bovington, and made his League debut against Fulham on 30 April 1962. Burkett made 142 League appearances for West Ham, scoring four goals. He also made 39 cup appearances, and was a member of the FA Cup winning side of 1964. He was also a member of the European Cup Winners' Cup winning team of 1965.

Burkett lost his place in the West Ham team to John Charles after an injury during the 1966–67 season, and moved to Charlton Athletic for £10,000 on 12 June 1968. He later played for Millwall and Southend United although he never featured in the League for either team.

Burkett signed as player-manager at League of Ireland team St Patrick's Athletic in August 1971. In four seasons Burkett guided Pats to an FAI Cup Final in 1974 and several high place finishes. However, he was let go in April 1975.

Burkett returned to Southend United as player-coach. He went on to manage the Saudi Arabia under-18 team, then Ørsta of the Norwegian Third Division in 1980, before returning again to Southend as youth coach. He later took the role of youth coach at Fulham. He later worked for the Professional Footballers' Association, where he worked with young professionals such as Rio Ferdinand, John Terry, Frank Lampard, Michael Carrick and Joe Cole.

== Honours ==
West Ham United

- FA Cup: 1963–64
- FA Charity Shield: 1964 (shared)
- European Cup Winners' Cup: 1964–65
- Football League Cup runner-up: 1965–66

St Patrick's Athletic

- LFA Presidents Cup: 1971–72
