= Tony Scott (footballer) =

English footballer (1941–2021)

- Scott with West Ham United

Personal information
- Full name: Anthony Scott
- Date of birth: 1 April 1941
- Place of birth: Huntingdon, England
- Date of death: 17 September 2021 (aged 80)
- Place of death: Thornlie, Perth, Australia
- Position: Winger

Youth career
- Huntingdon Boys
- St Neots Town
- 1957–1959: West Ham United

Senior career*
Years	Team	Apps	(Gls)
1959–1965	West Ham United	83	(16)
1965–1967	Aston Villa	50	(3)
1967–1970	Torquay United	87	(4)
1970–1972	AFC Bournemouth	62	(6)
1972–1974	Exeter City	51	(2)
Total		333	(31)
- * Club domestic league appearances and goals

Anthony Scott (1 April 1941 – 17 September 2021) was an English professional footballer who played as a left winger.

Scott played for Huntingdon Boys and St Neots Town before joining the groundstaff at West Ham United in 1957. After three years, and with 12 appearances for England Youth, Scott made his senior debut on 6 February 1960 against Chelsea.

Partnering Phil Woosnam on the left wing, Scott played 97 games for West Ham, scoring 19 goals, before moving to Aston Villa. He played his last game for West Ham on 11 September 1965 against Leicester City in a 2-5 home defeat.

Scott joined Villa for £25,000 and rekindled his partnership with Woosnam. He went on to make 57 appearances and score five goals for the Midlanders until his departure in September 1967. He then joined Torquay United, where he played under former Hammer Frank O'Farrell and linked up with his old teammate John Bond.

Scott followed Bond, who went on to become manager of Bournemouth & Boscombe Athletic, in July 1970. Bournemouth, who also had ex-Hammer Ken Brown as coach, finished runners-up in Scott's first season. He made a total of 61 League appearances, scoring six goals. He moved to Exeter City in June 1972 and managed two goals in 51 League appearances before being forced to retire through injury in May 1974.

He later became a coach working with John Bond again at Manchester City and in Kuwait.

He emigrated to Australia with his wife Sheila in 1989, where he lived until his death in September 2021.
