= Brian Rhodes (footballer) =

English footballer

Personal information
- Full name: Brian William Rhodes
- Date of birth: 23 October 1937
- Place of birth: Marylebone, England
- Date of death: 17 November 1993 (aged 56)
- Place of death: New Zealand
- Position: Goalkeeper

Youth career
- 1954–1957: West Ham United

Senior career*
Years	Team	Apps	(Gls)
1957–1963	West Ham United	61	(0)
1963–1964	Southend United	11	(0)
1964–1965	South Coast United		
- * Club domestic league appearances and goals as of 10 May 2009

Brian William Rhodes (23 October 1937 – 17 November 1993) was an English footballer who played as a goalkeeper.

Born in Marylebone, Rhodes played professional football for West Ham United, joining the club as a junior before playing 61 league matches. After leaving West Ham Rhodes joined Southend United where he played 11 matches in 1963 and 1964. In 1964 Rhodes emigrated to Australia where he played for South Coast United and represented the state of New South Wales.
