= John Bond (footballer) =

English footballer & manager (1932–2012)

- Bond with West Ham United

Personal information
- Full name: John Frederick Bond
- Date of birth: 17 December 1932
- Place of birth: Dedham, Essex, England
- Date of death: 25 September 2012 (aged 79)
- Place of death: Manchester, England
- Position: Right-back

Youth career
- –1950: Colchester Casuals

Senior career*
Years	Team	Apps	(Gls)
1950–1966	West Ham United	381	(32)
1966–1969	Torquay United	130	(12)
Total		511	(44)

Managerial career
- 1970–1973: AFC Bournemouth
- 1973–1980: Norwich City
- 1980–1983: Manchester City
- 1983–1984: Burnley
- 1984–1985: Swansea City
- 1986–1987: Birmingham City
- 1991–1993: Shrewsbury Town
- 1997–1999: Witton Albion
- * Club domestic league appearances and goals

John Frederick Bond (17 December 1932 – 25 September 2012) was an English professional football player and manager. He played from 1950 until 1966 for West Ham United, making 444 appearances in all competitions and scoring 37 goals. He was a member of the West Ham side which won the 1957–58 Second Division and the 1964 FA Cup. He also played for Torquay United until 1969. He managed seven different Football League clubs, and was the manager of the Norwich City side which made the 1975 Football League Cup Final and the Manchester City side which made the 1981 FA Cup Final. He is the father of Kevin Bond, a former footballer and coach.

== Playing career ==
Bond was born in Dedham, Essex. He played for North-East Essex Schools and Essex Army cadets before joining West Ham United in March 1950 from Colchester Casuals, his league debut coming two seasons later in a 2–1 away win against Coventry City. Bond had been spotted playing by West Ham assistant-manager Ted Fenton when he was manager with Colchester United. He had convinced manager Charlie Paynter to offer Bond a contract and Bond turned professional in March 1950. His ability as a goal-scoring right-back soon resulted in him gaining a regular place in the Hammers side, his partnership with Noel Cantwell proving particularly useful. As West Ham won the Second Division title in 1957–58, Bond missed only one game, and scored eight goals. At this time he was also selected for the England 'A' side. A popular favourite of the fans at Upton Park, he was usually referred to as 'Muffin' because of his ability to kick like a mule. In 1959, he was tried as a centre forward, scoring twice in one game against Bolton Wanderers and a hat-trick against Chelsea in February 1960.

By 1963, Bond was in competition for the right-back position with Joe Kirkup, but was picked for the 1964 FA Cup Final win at Wembley towards the end of his Upton Park career, but missed out on the European Cup Winners' Cup Final victory the following season, despite playing four times in the earlier rounds of the competition. He played his final match for the club on 17 April 1965, a 1–0 away defeat to Leicester City. He played 381 league games for the Hammers, in which he scored 32 times. In January 1966, Bond left to join Torquay United, then managed by his former West Ham teammate Frank O'Farrell, on a free transfer. He was awarded a testimonial at West Ham in May 1966, but was unable to play due to a groin injury.

He played 130 league games for the Gulls, scoring 12 goals, and helped Torquay to promotion at the end of his first season. He retired in 1969, having already opened a sweet shop (Bondy's Tuck Shop) in the Torre area of Torquay.

== Coaching and managerial career ==
Bond's coaching career began when he joined the staff at Gillingham (having been turned down on applying for the manager's job at Torquay United), and in May 1970 he replaced Freddie Cox as manager of Bournemouth & Boscombe Athletic. He is usually credited with the change of club name to its current name of AFC Bournemouth, and with the introduction of the black and red strip - modelling AC Milan. Bond led the club to promotion as Fourth Division runners-up at the end of his first season, and almost to promotion again the following season, as Bournemouth finished third in the Third Division. His son Kevin has also managed Bournemouth.

=== Norwich City ===
His successes at Bournemouth led to him being appointed Norwich City manager in November 1973, replacing Ron Saunders. This followed a period of negotiations between the two clubs, Norwich eventually paying £10,000 in compensation for the acquisition of Bond and his chief coach Ken Brown. Bond continued his successes at Norwich, signing players such as Martin Peters, Ted MacDougall and Phil Boyer.

The end of the 1973–74 season saw Norwich relegated in last place, but the following season he guided them back to the top flight at the first attempt, and also to the League Cup Final, which they lost 1–0 to Aston Villa at Wembley. He then managed to keep Norwich in the top flight, despite the financial constraints he was under, until resigning to manage Manchester City in October 1980, taking his assistants John Benson and John Sainty with him.

=== Manchester City ===
City had made a very poor start to the 1980–81 season when he took over, costing Malcolm Allison his job. Bond galvanised the side by signing experienced reinforcements to complement promising youngsters at the club, oversaw an upturn in results which saw City finish in a more respectable mid-table position, whilst the following season saw a 10th-place finish and was highlighted by a 3–1 win over Liverpool at Anfield.

The end of his first season in charge at Maine Road saw Bond lead City out at Wembley for the FA Cup Final against Tottenham Hotspur, which they lost 3–2 in the replay game, made famous by Ricky Villa's goal (the game also featured a volley by City's Steve MacKenzie). Bond resigned from City in February 1983, with the side ninth in the table. Thereafter, under John Benson, City plummeted towards the relegation zone and were relegated on the final day.

During their FA Cup run, Bond guided Manchester City to a 6–0 win over former club Norwich City at Maine Road in the fourth round. At the end of this thrilling game, Bond jumped from an upper tier of the stand into the players' tunnel, in order that he could offer his commiserations to son Kevin, who was playing for Norwich. An act which Danny Baker describes as "attempted a little James Bond" in the Match of the Eighties nostalgia TV show 16 years later.

=== Burnley and beyond ===
In June 1983, Bond took over at Burnley, newly relegated to Division Three and with high expectations of going straight back up. He brought in some of his previous players from Manchester City, selling players such as Trevor Steven, Lee Dixon and Brian Laws, the previous season's player of the year, who were all destined for greater things. He was not well liked amongst the fans and left in August 1984 after Burnley had finished 12th.

In December 1984 he was appointed manager of Swansea City who were struggling to avoid being relegated from the First to Fourth Divisions in successive seasons. He immediately released some of the younger players (most notably Dean Saunders) to bring in some older heads. They ended the season just one place clear of relegation, but the following season started badly and with the Swans on the brink of bankruptcy, Bond left on 20 December 1985 and Swansea were relegated at the end of the season to complete their demise since the John Toshack era.

On 22 January 1986, Bond was appointed manager of Birmingham City and failed to prevent their relegation from Division One, seven consecutive defeats at the end of the season sealing their fate. The following season, Birmingham struggled again, eventually finishing just one place away from relegation to Division Three. This was not good enough for the Birmingham board and Bond was sacked on 27 May 1987.

He was appointed assistant manager to Asa Hartford at Shrewsbury Town in January 1990, and a year later, in January 1991, was appointed manager after Hartford's dismissal. At the end of the 1990–91 season, Shrewsbury narrowly avoided relegation from the Third Division, but the following season, Bond failed to keep them up, and Shrewsbury were relegated back to the bottom flight (by now renamed Division Three by the Premier League shake-up). When Shrewsbury went to Burnley Bond was advised by the police not to attend. The following season saw Shrewsbury finish ninth, and at the end of July 1993, Bond resigned, along with the Shrewsbury chairman.

== After management ==
He assisted his son Kevin, who was manager at Stafford Rangers, mainly in a scouting capacity. In August 1998, Bond was appointed manager at Witton Albion, whose Manager had been sacked just days before the start of the new season, Bond was appointed first on an interim basis, before talking over for the rest of the season in November 1998 and they eventually finished in a healthy eighth place in the Northern Premier League First Division. In September 1999, Bond, by now nearing his 67th birthday, was brought out of retirement by Wigan Athletic manager John Benson to assist with coaching and scouting in a consultancy position. He left Wigan after less than 12 months following Benson's move to the role of director of football.

In November 2009, he appeared on the Sky Sports programme "Time of Our Lives", where he, along with Ken Brown, Ronnie Boyce and presenter Jeff Stelling looked back on their era at West Ham. This programme was repeated on the day after his death in memory of him.

Bond died on 25 September 2012 aged 79.

== Managerial statistics ==
Managerial record by team and tenure
Team	From	To	Record				
Team	From	To	P	W	D	L	Win %
AFC Bournemouth	1 May 1970	27 November 1973	179	82	57	40	45.8
Norwich City	27 November 1973	14 October 1980	352	105	122	125	29.8
Manchester City	17 November 1980	3 February 1983	123	51	32	40	41.5
Burnley	14 June 1983	1 August 1984	57	21	16	20	36.8
Swansea City	16 December 1984	20 December 1985	58	16	13	29	27.6
Birmingham City	22 January 1986	27 May 1987	65	17	20	28	26.2
Shrewsbury Town	17 January 1991	31 July 1993	130	44	28	58	33.8
Total			964	336	288	340	34.9

== Honours ==
=== As a player ===
West Ham United

- FA Cup: 1963–64
- FA Charity Shield: 1964

=== As a manager ===
Norwich City

- Football League Cup runner-up: 1974–75

Manchester City

- FA Cup runner-up: 1980–81
