= Ron Greenwood =

English footballer and manager (1921–2006)

Ron Greenwood CBE

Personal information
- Full name: Ronald Greenwood
- Date of birth: 11 November 1921
- Place of birth: Worsthorne, England
- Date of death: 9 February 2006 (aged 84)
- Place of death: Sudbury, England
- Position: Defender

Youth career
- Chelsea

Senior career*
Years	Team	Apps	(Gls)
1945–1949	Bradford Park Avenue	59	(0)
1949–1952	Brentford	142	(1)
1952–1955	Chelsea	65	(0)
1955–1956	Fulham	42	(0)
Total		308	(1)

International career
1952	England B	1	(0)

Managerial career
- 1961–1974: West Ham United
- 1977–1982: England
- * Club domestic league appearances and goals

Ronald Greenwood CBE (11 November 1921 – 9 February 2006) was an English football player and manager. He managed West Ham United for 13 years, from 1961 to 1974, a time during which the club gained much of its fame. He coached the England national football team from 1977 until 1982, leading them to their first FIFA World Cup qualification in 12 years.

== Early years ==
Ron Greenwood was born at 15 Lennox Street, Worsthorne, near Burnley, Lancashire, but moved to London in 1931 during the Depression. He was educated at the Wembley County Grammar School which now forms part of Alperton Community School in Middlesex, leaving at the age of 14 to be an apprentice sign-writer. He served with an RAF mobile radio unit first of all in Northern Ireland and later in France during the Second World War.

== Playing career ==
Greenwood played as a centre-half, joining Chelsea as an amateur whilst training as an apprentice sign-writer. During World War II he served in the Royal Air Force in Northern Ireland and guested for Belfast Celtic. In 1945, he left Chelsea for Bradford Park Avenue and made 59 league appearances over the next four seasons.

In 1949, Greenwood moved to the club he supported as a boy, Brentford, his £9,500 fee breaking the club's incoming transfer record. He made 147 appearances and scored one goal. After three years at Brentford, he returned to Chelsea, where he played 66 times and won a First Division winners' medal in the 1954–55 season under Ted Drake. That summer, he moved to Fulham, where he made another 42 league appearances before retiring at the end of the 1955–56 season. He was never capped for his country, though he did make a single 'B' team appearance, whilst at Brentford, in a 1–0 victory against the Netherlands on 23 March 1952 at the Olympisch Stadion in Amsterdam. At the end of his playing career in 1956, Greenwood became an active freemason, attending the Lodge of Proven Fellowship No. 6225, but resigned in 1977.

== Coaching career ==
After retiring, Greenwood moved into coaching. He coached Eastbourne United, Oxford University (where he came to the attention of Sir Harold Thompson, a future Chairman of The Football Association), and England youth teams. He combined the England under-23 post with being the assistant manager at Arsenal under George Swindin, having moved to Highbury in December 1957. He remained there until April 1961, when he was selected by chairman Reg Pratt to replace Ted Fenton as manager of West Ham United.

Greenwood's reign at West Ham brought them sizeable success. He oversaw the development of players such as the 1966 FIFA World Cup-winning trio of Bobby Moore, Geoff Hurst and Martin Peters, and under him the Hammers won the FA Cup in 1964 and the European Cup Winners' Cup in 1965 – the first two major trophies of their history. West Ham's league form under Greenwood was less impressive, usually finishing in the lower half of the First Division table, though they did come sixth in the 1972–73 season. In his final season, West Ham finished 18th, just one point from relegation.

He moved upstairs in 1974, becoming the club's general manager for the next three years, with John Lyall being placed in charge of the first team. In the first season of this arrangement, West Ham won another FA Cup.

After England coach Don Revie's resignation, Greenwood was appointed in caretaker charge, completing England's unsuccessful bid to qualify for the 1978 FIFA World Cup, and eventually becoming full-time manager in December 1977, ending his 16-year association with West Ham United. Under Greenwood, England qualified for UEFA Euro 1980, where they were knocked out in the group stage. England also qualified for the 1982 FIFA World Cup under Greenwood, their first World Cup in twelve years. England came through the tournament unbeaten, but were knocked out in the second group stage after 0–0 draws against West Germany and hosts Spain.

Greenwood retired from football after the 1982 World Cup, with the national coach's job going to Bobby Robson. One major landmark during Greenwood's tenure was the selection of the first black player for England, Viv Anderson, in 1978. Greenwood stated: "Yellow, purple or black – if they're good enough, I'll pick them".

== Life after football ==
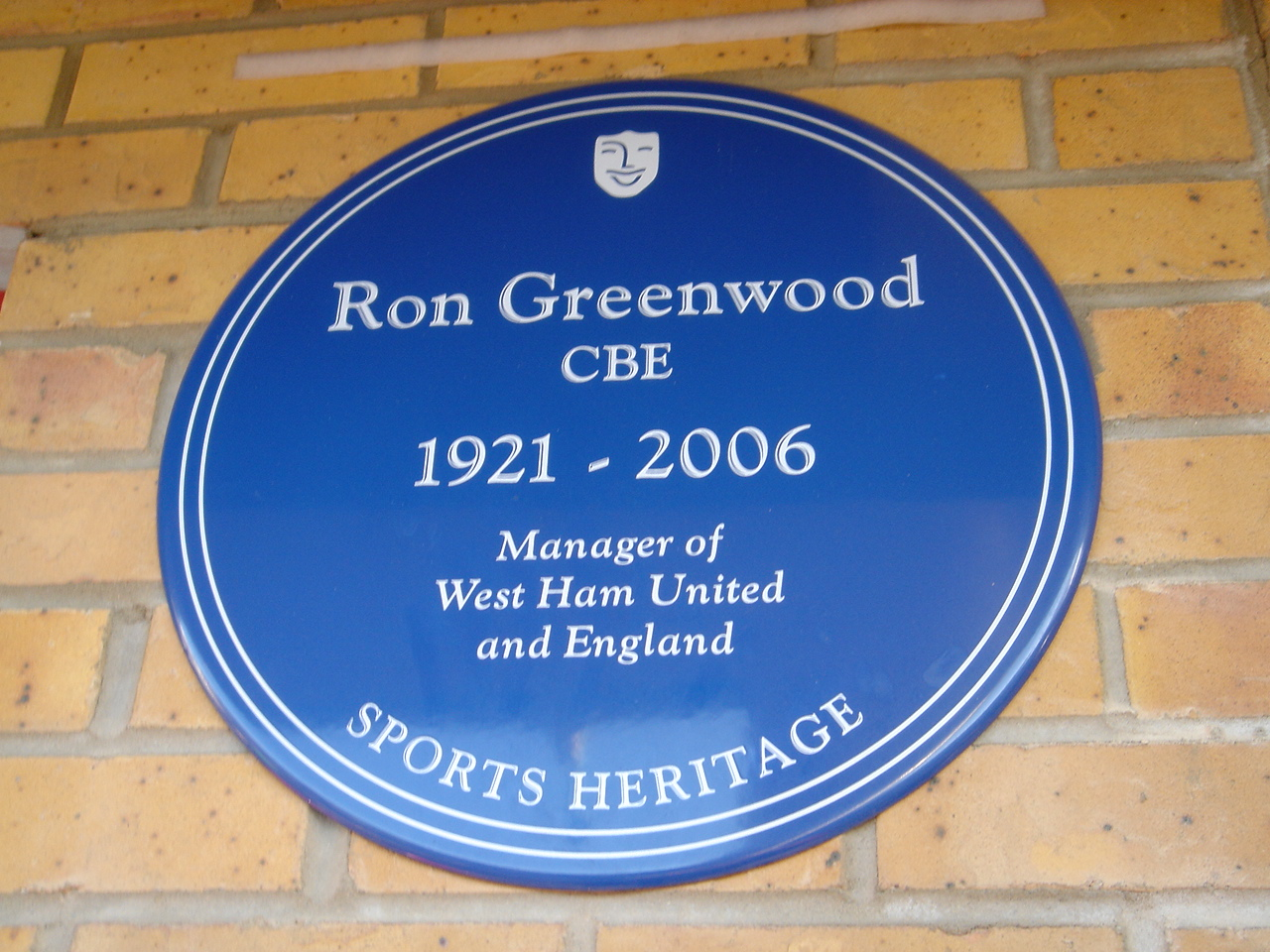
Sports Heritage Blue Plaque for Ron Greenwood outside West Ham's Boleyn Ground

After his career in football, Greenwood was a regular analyst on BBC Radio. He died of a heart attack on the morning on 9 February 2006, aged 84, after living with Alzheimer's disease for some time. When West Ham played Birmingham City in a Premier League fixture on 13 February 2006, a one-minute silence was held in Greenwood's memory. West Ham won the game 3–0.

The Town Council of Loughton, where Greenwood lived during his time as West Ham manager, erected a blue plaque to his memory on one of his former houses in the town, 22 Brooklyn Avenue: this was unveiled by Sir Trevor Brooking and the Town Mayor, Chris Pond on 28 October 2008. The Heritage Foundation charity erected a blue plaque in Greenwood's memory at West Ham's Upton Park, which was unveiled by his family on 21 January 2007.

Greenwood was inducted into the English Football Hall of Fame in 2006, recognising his achievements as a manager in the English game. He is also a member of the FA and LMA Halls of Fame. He was survived by his widow, Lucy. He is buried in the Town Cemetery at Sudbury in Suffolk.

== Honours ==
=== Player ===
Chelsea

- Football League First Division: 1954–55

=== Manager ===
West Ham United

- FA Cup: 1963–64
- FA Charity Shield: 1964 (shared)
- European Cup Winners' Cup: 1964–65
- Football League Cup runner-up: 1965–66

Individual

- English Football Hall of Fame inductee: 2006

== Managerial statistics ==
Managerial record by team and tenure
Team	From	To	Record				
Team	From	To	P	W	D	L	Win %
West Ham United	1 April 1961	16 August 1974	658	236	174	248	35.9
England	17 August 1977	5 July 1982	55	33	12	10	60.0
Total			713	269	186	258	37.7
