= Jim Standen =

English footballer

Personal information
- Full name: James Alfred Standen
- Date of birth: 30 May 1935 (age 91)
- Place of birth: Edmonton, London, England
- Height: 6 ft 0 in (1.83 m)
- Position: Goalkeeper

Youth career
- 1951–1953: Rickmansworth Town

Senior career*
Years	Team	Apps	(Gls)
1953–1960	Arsenal	35	(0)
1960–1962	Luton Town	36	(0)
1962–1968	West Ham United	178	(0)
1968	Detroit Cougars	12	(0)
1968–1970	Millwall	8	(0)
1970–1972	Portsmouth	13	(0)
- Cricket career
Cricket information
- Batting: Right-handed
- Bowling: Right-arm-medium
Career statistics
Competition	First-class	List A
Matches	133	27
Runs scored	2,092	217
Batting average	14.32	12.76
100s/50s	0/2	0/0
Top score	92*	31
Balls bowled	19,599	1,189
Wickets	313	43
Bowling average	25.34	18.44
5 wickets in innings	13	1
10 wickets in match	0	0
Best bowling	7/30	5/14
Catches/stumpings	83/–	17/–
- Source: Cricinfo, 14 April 2023
- * Club domestic league appearances and goals

James Alfred Standen (born 30 May 1935) is an English former professional footballer who played as a goalkeeper in the Football League for Arsenal, Luton Town, West Ham United, Millwall and Portsmouth. He won the FA Cup and the European Cup Winners' Cup with West Ham. Standen was also a professional cricketer for Worcestershire, where he won a County Championship.

== Football career ==
Jim Standen started his footballing career at Rickmansworth, being discovered there by Leslie Compton who introduced him to Arsenal, where he joined the club in 1953. His appearances at Arsenal were limited, first by National Service and then by the presence of Wales international Jack Kelsey. He finally made his debut for Arsenal against Burnley on 7 December 1957. He then deputised for Kelsey when he was injured in the 1958–59 season and upon Kelsey's return the two goalkeepers shared the spot during the 1959–60 season. However, Kelsey regained the number one jersey outright at the start of 1960–61 and Standen left Arsenal for Luton Town in October 1960. He made 38 appearances for Arsenal in all.

At Luton, Standen was forced to understudy again, this time for England's Ron Baynham. Standen then joined east London club West Ham United as an emergency signing after their regular keeper Lawrie Leslie suffered a broken leg in 1962. He became a big hit at Upton Park and went on to win the 1963–64 FA Cup and the 1964–65 European Cup Winners' Cup with the club. Altogether Standen made 179 league and 57 cup appearances for West Ham.

After losing his place due to the arrival of Bobby Ferguson in 1967, Standen moved to the Detroit Cougars in the United States. He returned to England with Millwall for the 1969–70 season, playing eight games for the south London club before signing a two-year contract with Portsmouth. After 13 games for Pompey, he retired from football.

After his retirement, Standen owned a sports shop in Camberley, Surrey, before moving to California, where he was a goalkeeper coach at Fresno State University for a time.

== Cricket career ==
As a cricketer, Standen was primarily a right-arm medium pace bowler. After previously playing for Chorleywood and in the Minor Counties Championship for Hertfordshire, he joined Worcestershire in 1959 and played first-class cricket. He won the County Championship with them in 1964, playing in 11 of the 28 games and heading the First Class bowling averages with 52 wickets at 14.42. The following season the county won the title again, but he played in only one match. In all he took 313 first-class wickets between 1959 and 1970 at an average of 25.34.

== Honours ==
=== Football ===
West Ham United

- FA Cup: 1963–64
- FA Charity Shield: 1964
- European Cup Winners' Cup: 1964–65
- Football League Cup runner-up: 1965–66

=== Cricket ===
Worcestershire

- County Championship: 1964
