= Ronnie Boyce =

English footballer and manager (1943–2025)

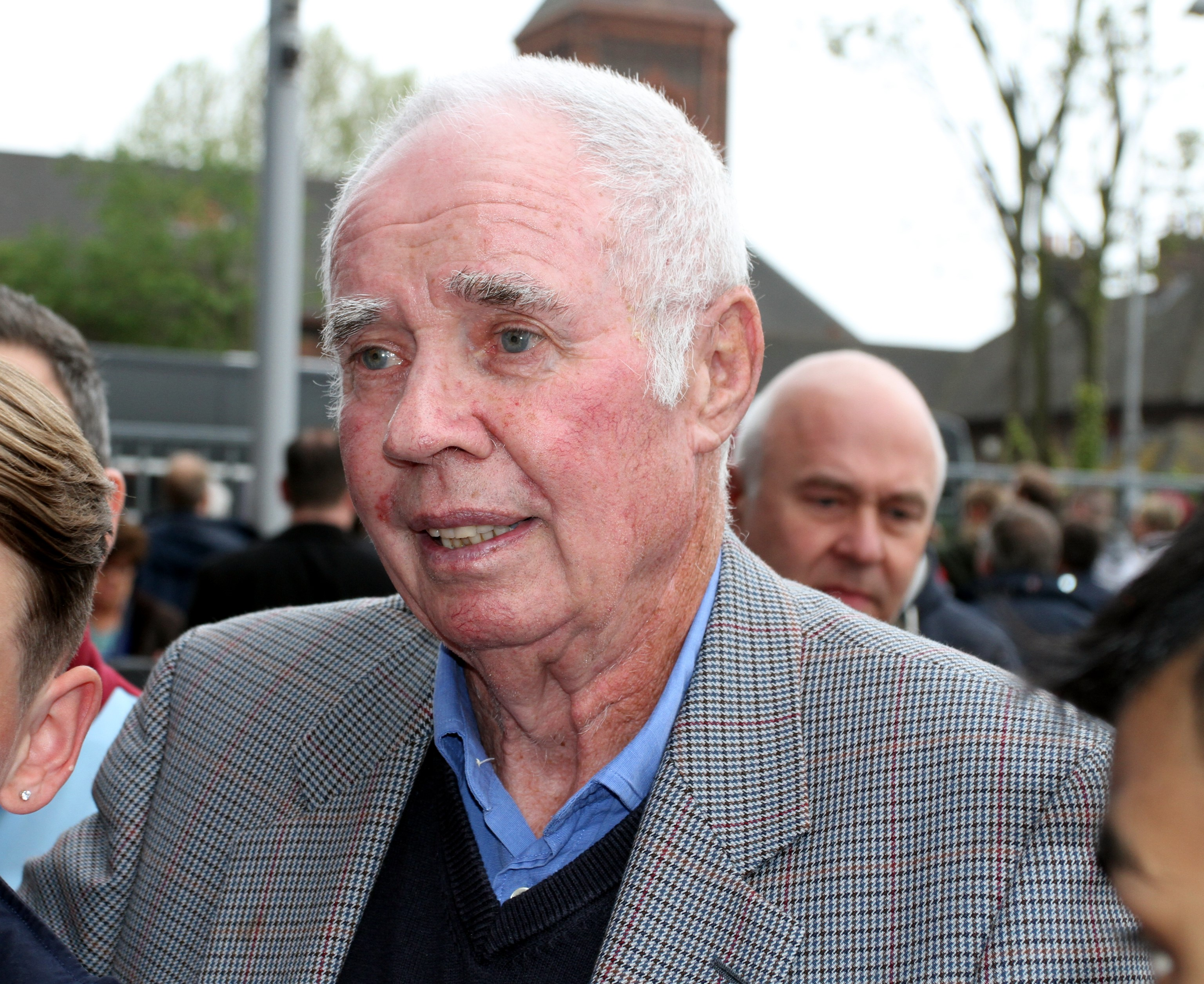
- Boyce at Upton Park in 2015

Personal information
- Full name: Ronald William Boyce
- Date of birth: 6 January 1943
- Place of birth: East Ham, Essex, England
- Date of death: 13 February 2025 (aged 82)
- Position: Midfielder

Senior career*
Years	Team	Apps	(Gls)
1959–1973	West Ham United	282	(21)

Managerial career
- 1990: West Ham United (caretaker)
- * Club domestic league appearances and goals

Ronald William Boyce (6 January 1943 – 13 February 2025) was an English professional footballer who played his entire career for West Ham United, making 282 Football League appearances for them.

== Early life and education ==
Boyce attended East Ham Grammar School.

== Career ==
Boyce played for England schoolboys football team and for Essex Schoolboys at cricket. He joined West Ham as an apprentice in 1959 and made his first-team debut in a Southern Floodlight Cup game against Millwall on 13 October 1959. His first Football League game was over a year later, on 22 October 1960, in a 5–2 home win against Preston North End. He made a total of 342 appearances for West Ham in all competitions, scoring 29 goals. This included 282 league appearances between 1960 and 1972, in which he scored 21 goals. He also made 22 FA Cup appearances, scoring five goals, the most important of which was the winner in the 3–2 win over Preston North End in the 1964 FA Cup Final. He was also a member of the 1965 European Cup Winners' Cup–winning team on 19 May 1965. His nickname, "Ticker", relates to his role as the "heartbeat" of those cup wins. His final two seasons with the club, 1971–72 and 1972–73, saw Boyce restricted to three substitute appearances as he was used as backup for Trevor Brooking, Billy Bonds and Pat Holland. He was awarded a testimonial match against Manchester United, managed by former Hammers player Frank O'Farrell, on 13 November 1972. His final appearance for West Ham came on 30 December 1972 in a 2–1 away defeat to Leicester City.

After retiring as a player, Boyce became a member of the coaching staff under John Lyall for a period that included the FA Cup Final victories in 1975 against Fulham and against Arsenal in 1980. He subsequently coached under Billy Bonds. Boyce also took charge of West Ham for one game as caretaker manager in February 1990. He was appointed West Ham's chief scout in September 1991, remaining in that position until 1995. He went on to hold coaching roles at Queens Park Rangers and Millwall, before joining Tottenham Hotspur as a scout in 1998.

== Later life and death ==
Boyce was honoured with a Lifetime Achievement Award by West Ham in 2019.

Boyce died on 13 February 2025, at the age of 82.

== Honours ==
West Ham

- FA Cup: 1963–64
- FA Charity Shield: 1964
- European Cup Winners' Cup: 1964–65
- Football League Cup runner-up: 1965–66
