= Joe Kirkup =

English footballer (born 1939)

Personal information
- Full name: Joseph Robert Kirkup
- Date of birth: 17 December 1939 (age 86)
- Place of birth: Hexham, Northumberland, England
- Position: Full-back

Senior career*
Years	Team	Apps	(Gls)
1958–1966	West Ham United	165	(6)
1966–1967	Chelsea	53	(2)
1967–1975	Southampton	169	(3)
1975–1976	Durban City		
Total		387	(11)

Managerial career
- 1975–1976: Durban City
- * Club domestic league appearances and goals

Joseph Robert Kirkup (born 17 December 1939) is an English former professional footballer who played as a full-back in the Football League for West Ham United, Chelsea and Southampton.

== Playing career ==
Kirkup played junior football with West Ham United, and was a member of the FA Youth Cup final team of 1956–57 alongside John Lyall and John Smith. After signing for the senior team at the age of 17, he made his League debut against Manchester City in December 1958. He was a member of the team that won the 1965 European Cup Winners' Cup.

Kirkup made 165 League appearances for West Ham, scoring six goals, before joining Chelsea in March 1966 for £27,000. He made 53 League appearances for the west London club, and joined Southampton in 1967. He made 193 appearances for the Saints, scoring four goals.

In 1975, Kirkup emigrated to South Africa to join Durban City F.C. as player-manager, taking over the post from his old teammate Johnny Byrne. He returned to England in mid-1976 and joined Byfleet Machine & Tool Company.

== Honours ==
West Ham

- European Cup Winners' Cup: 1964–65

Chelsea

- FA Cup runner-up: 1966–67
