= Ken Brown (footballer) =

English footballer and manager

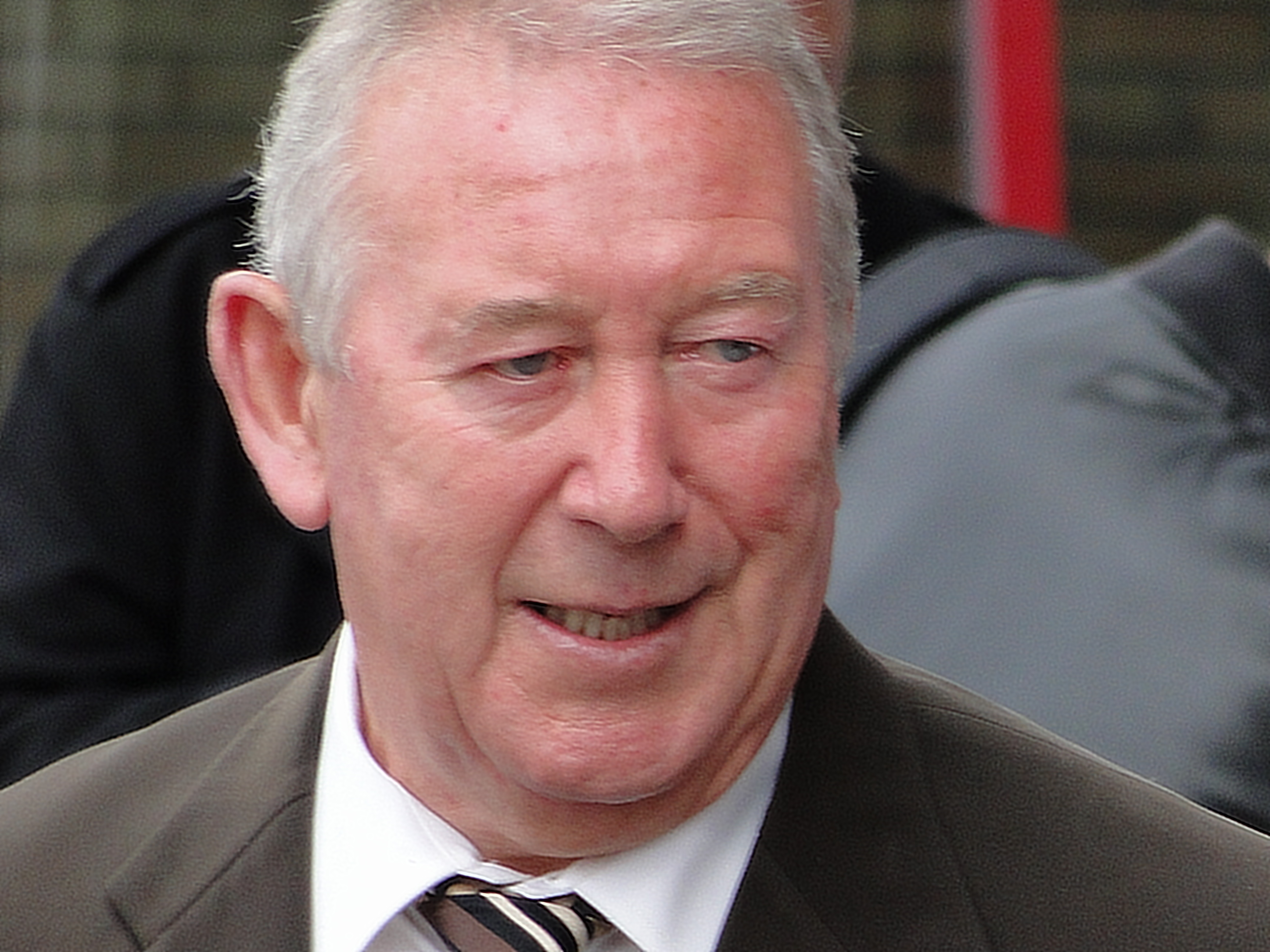
- Brown at Upton Park, 2010

Personal information
- Date of birth: 16 February 1934 (age 92)
- Place of birth: Forest Gate, London, England
- Position: Centre-half

Youth career
- Neville United
- 1951–1953: West Ham United

Senior career*
| Years | Team | Apps | (Gls) |
| 1953–1967 | West Ham United | 386 | (4) |
| 1967–1969 | Torquay United | 42 | (1) |
| 1969–1970 | Hereford United | | |
| Total | | 428 | (5) |

International career
| 1959 | England | 1 | (0) |

Managerial career
- 1980–1987: Norwich City
- 1987: Shrewsbury Town
- 1988–1990: Plymouth Argyle
- * Club domestic league appearances and goals

Kenneth Brown (born 16 February 1934) is an English former football player and manager. As player, he made more than 400 appearances in the Football League representing West Ham United, where he spent the majority of his career, and Torquay United, and was capped once for the England national team. As manager, he took charge of Norwich City, Shrewsbury Town and Plymouth Argyle.

== Playing career ==
Brown was playing for local Dagenham side Neville United when he signed professional for West Ham United on 16 October 1951. He quickly made his way into the reserve side, but first team football was much harder to come by, his debut eventually coming in February 1953 against Rotherham United as a replacement for Malcolm Allison. His first five years as a professional saw him only make occasional appearances for the Hammers, although national service between 1952 and 1954 did not help.

Brown started the 1957–58 season as first-choice in the centre of the West Ham defence, and remained there, missing only one game as West Ham won the Second Division title. On 18 November 1959, Brown made his only appearance for England, a 2–1 victory over Northern Ireland at Wembley. He was a member of the 1964 FA Cup winning side, and the following year was back at Wembley as part of the European Cup Winners' Cup winning side, playing alongside Bobby Moore.

In May 1967, after receiving a testimonial from West Ham, Brown followed his friend John Bond to Torquay United for a fee of £4000. He had played 386 league games and scored 4 goals. He played 42 league games for Torquay, scoring once, before moving to Southern League Hereford United, then managed by Welsh legend John Charles, in May 1969 for one final season as a player.

== Coaching and managerial career ==
When John Bond was appointed manager of Bournemouth & Boscombe Athletic in 1970, Brown was appointed as his trainer (although many sources have later described him as assistant manager which was Reg Tyrrell), and in November 1973, Brown followed Bond to Norwich City, becoming assistant manager. In October 1980, Bond left to manage Manchester City and Brown took over the reins at Norwich, though was unable to stop them being relegated. The following season Norwich were promoted back to Division One at the first attempt. They won the League Cup in 1985, but were relegated at the end of the season, only to bounce back at the first attempt again the following season as Second Division champions.

Their next season back in the top flight saw Brown lead his side to fifth place, then Norwich's highest ever final position. They even topped the league during the first half of the season, and proved to be the hardest side to beat in the First Division alongside champions Everton.

The following season, Norwich started badly and by Christmas, Brown had been sacked. In addition to his success on the pitch at Norwich, he had displayed a great ability for spotting talent at lower league clubs and in the reserve sides of other top flight clubs. The likes of Dave Watson, Steve Bruce, Ian Crook, Mike Phelan and Bryan Gunn were all brought to the club by Brown in this fashion. Watson went on to enjoy league title and FA Cup glory at being sold to Everton in 1986. Bruce was sold to Manchester United immediately after Brown's sacking, and went on to lift a succession of trophies at Old Trafford. Phelan followed Bruce to Old Trafford and collected winner's medals in the league and cup competitions during the first four of his five seasons there. Crook spent a total of 11 seasons at Carrow Road and played a part in some of Norwich's great successes, while also enduring a relegation in 1995. Gunn, who was signed from Aberdeen a year before Brown's sacking, remained at Carrow Road until the end of his playing career in 1999, and would spend a total of 23 years at the club as a player, member of the coaching staff and finally serving a brief spell as manager.

In December 1987, Brown took charge of Shrewsbury Town for one match in the Second Division, but decided against taking the job permanently and took time out of football instead. In July 1988 he was appointed manager of Plymouth Argyle, where one of his signings was his son Kenny Junior from Norwich City, who would later be sold to West Ham United for £170,000. Brown was controversially sacked as Plymouth manager in February 1990, and decided to once more take time away from football. His spell in charge of Plymouth would prove to be his last managerial appointment.

In 1994, he was approached by England manager Terry Venables to work part-time as a scout, a duty he has since also performed for Glenn Hoddle and Kevin Keegan, whilst maintaining his business interest in the Lakenham Leisure Centre in Norwich.

In February 2004 he was guest of honour at Carrow Road for the home game against West Ham to celebrate the opening of a new stand, when a special presentation was made to Brown to commemorate his 70th birthday.

== Personal life ==
Ken is the father of Kenny Brown, also a footballer and manager, as well as Amanda Brown, a former tennis international and twice winner of the Australian Open Girls' singles championships. In April 2015 during a burglary at his home in Blofield near Norwich, Brown's medals from the 1964 FA Cup Final, the 1965 European Cup Winners' Cup Final and the 1965 League Cup Final were stolen. In May, West Ham United football club offered a reward of £5,000 to anyone providing information leading to the arrest and the conviction of those responsible for the break-in. As of 2026, Brown is the oldest living former player of West Ham United.

== Honours ==
=== Player ===
West Ham United

- FA Cup: 1963–64
- FA Charity Shield: 1964
- European Cup Winners' Cup: 1964–65
- Football League Cup runner-up: 1965–66

=== Manager ===
Norwich City

- Football League Cup: 1984–85
