= 1963–64 FA Cup =

Tournament details
- Country: England; Wales
- Teams: 375

Final positions
- Champions: West Ham United (1st title)
- Runners-up: Preston North End

Tournament statistics
- Matches played: 459
- Goals scored: 1,631 (3.55 per match)
- Top goal scorer: Denis Law (10)

The 1963–64 FA Cup was the 83rd staging of the world's oldest football cup competition, the Football Association Challenge Cup, commonly known as the FA Cup. West Ham United won the competition for the first time (despite having reached the 1923 final), beating Preston North End 3–2 in the final at Wembley.

Matches were scheduled to be played at the stadium of the team named first on the date specified for each round, which was always a Saturday. Some matches, however, might be rescheduled for other days if there were clashes with games for other competitions or the weather was inclement. If scores were level after 90 minutes had been played, a replay would take place at the stadium of the second-named team later the same week. If scores were level after 90 minutes had been played in a replay, a 30-minute period of extra time would be played.

== Calendar ==
Round	Date
First qualifying round	Saturday 7 September 1963
Second qualifying round	Saturday 21 September 1963
Third qualifying round	Saturday 5 October 1963
Fourth qualifying round	Saturday 19 October 1963
First round proper	Saturday 16 November 1963
Second round	Saturday 7 December 1963
Third round	Saturday 4 January 1964
Fourth round	Saturday 25 January 1964
Fifth round	Saturday 15 February 1964
Sixth round	Saturday 29 February 1964
Semi-finals	Saturday 14 March 1964
Final	Saturday 2 May 1964

== Qualifying rounds ==
Most participating clubs that were not members of the Football League competed in the qualifying rounds to secure one of 30 places available in the first round.

The winners from the fourth qualifying round were Crook Town, Blyth Spartans, Gateshead, Netherfield (Kendal), Bangor City, Altrincham, Chorley, Hereford United, Loughborough United, Kettering Town, Corby Town, Frickley Colliery, Heanor Town, Cambridge United, Bedford Town, Harwich & Parkeston, Chelmsford City, Folkestone Town, Gravesend & Northfleet, Margate, Bexley United, Tooting & Mitcham United, Barnet, Enfield, Maidenhead United, Trowbridge Town, Weymouth, Bridgwater Town, Yeovil Town and Bath City.

Bexley United was the only qualifying club appearing in the main competition for the first time, although Corby Town had last featured at this stage in 1954-55, Folkestone Town in 1951-52, Chorley in 1945-46 and Altrincham in 1933-34.

== First round proper ==
At this stage the 48 clubs from the Football League Third and Fourth Divisions joined the 30 non-league clubs who came through the qualifying rounds. The final two non-league sides in the main draw, Wimbledon and Sutton United were given byes to this round as the champions and runners-up from the previous season's FA Amateur Cup.

Matches were scheduled to be played on Saturday, 16 November 1963, although three games were not played until the midweek fixture. Eight were drawn and went to replays.

Tie no	Home team	Score	Away team	Date
1	Chester	3–2	Blyth Spartans	16 November 1963
2	Darlington	1–4	Gateshead	16 November 1963
3	Bournemouth & Boscombe Athletic	1–3	Bristol Rovers	16 November 1963
4	Barrow	3–2	Bangor City	16 November 1963
5	Rochdale	2–1	Chorley	18 November 1963
6	Sutton United	0–4	Aldershot	16 November 1963
7	Weymouth	1–1	Bedford Town	16 November 1963
Replay	Bedford Town	1–0	Weymouth	21 November 1963
8	Yeovil Town	1–0	Southend United	16 November 1963
9	Reading	2–2	Enfield	16 November 1963
Replay	Enfield	2–4	Reading	19 November 1963
10	Notts County	2–1	Frickley Colliery	16 November 1963
11	Doncaster Rovers	3–0	Tranmere Rovers	16 November 1963
12	Trowbridge Town	1–6	Coventry City	16 November 1963
13	Queens Park Rangers	4–1	Gillingham	16 November 1963
14	Barnsley	1–0	Stockport County	16 November 1963
15	Brentford	2–2	Margate	16 November 1963
Replay	Margate	0–2	Brentford	20 November 1963
16	Crook Town	1–2	Chesterfield	16 November 1963
17	Brighton & Hove Albion	0–1	Colchester United	16 November 1963
18	Bradford City	1–2	Port Vale	16 November 1963
19	Hull City	2–2	Crewe Alexandra	16 November 1963
Replay	Crewe Alexandra	0–3	Hull City	20 November 1963
20	Oldham Athletic	3–2	Mansfield Town	20 November 1963
21	Crystal Palace	8–2	Harwich & Parkeston	16 November 1963
22	Altrincham	0–0	Wrexham	20 November 1963
Replay	Wrexham	3–0	Altrincham	27 November 1963
23	Bradford Park Avenue	3–1	Heanor Town	16 November 1963
24	Exeter City	2–1	Shrewsbury Town	16 November 1963
25	Hartlepools United	0–1	Lincoln City	16 November 1963
26	Southport	2–1	Walsall	16 November 1963
27	Maidenhead United	0–2	Bath City	16 November 1963
28	Torquay United	6–2	Barnet	16 November 1963
29	Workington	4–1	Halifax Town	16 November 1963
30	York City	2–5	Carlisle United	16 November 1963
31	Hereford United	1–1	Newport County	16 November 1963
Replay	Newport County	4–0	Hereford United	18 November 1963
32	Kettering Town	1–1	Millwall	16 November 1963
Replay	Millwall	2–3	Kettering Town	25 November 1963
33	Netherfield (Kendal)	6–1	Loughborough United	16 November 1963
34	Tooting & Mitcham United	1–2	Gravesend & Northfleet	16 November 1963
35	Peterborough United	1–1	Watford	16 November 1963
Replay	Watford	2–1	Peterborough United	19 November 1963
36	Bridgwater Town	0–3	Luton Town	16 November 1963
37	Corby Town	1–3	Bristol City	16 November 1963
38	Cambridge United	0–1	Chelmsford City	16 November 1963
39	Oxford United	2–0	Folkestone Town	16 November 1963
40	Bexley United	1–5	Wimbledon	16 November 1963

== Second round ==
The matches were scheduled for Saturday, 7 December 1963. Three matches were drawn, with replays taking place later the same week.

Tie no	Home team	Score	Away team	Date
1	Chester	0–2	Barrow	7 December 1963
2	Yeovil Town	3–1	Crystal Palace	7 December 1963
3	Lincoln City	2–0	Southport	7 December 1963
4	Luton Town	2–1	Reading	7 December 1963
5	Doncaster Rovers	1–1	Notts County	7 December 1963
Replay	Notts County	1–2	Doncaster Rovers	10 December 1963
6	Wrexham	0–2	Hull City	7 December 1963
7	Barnsley	3–1	Rochdale	7 December 1963
8	Brentford	1–0	Gravesend & Northfleet	7 December 1963
9	Coventry City	1–2	Bristol Rovers	7 December 1963
10	Carlisle United	4–3	Gateshead	7 December 1963
11	Oldham Athletic	2–0	Bradford Park Avenue	7 December 1963
12	Wimbledon	2–2	Bath City	7 December 1963
Replay	Bath City	4–0	Wimbledon	12 December 1963
13	Exeter City	0–2	Bristol City	7 December 1963
14	Port Vale	2–1	Workington	7 December 1963
15	Newport County	2–0	Watford	7 December 1963
16	Torquay United	2–3	Aldershot	7 December 1963
17	Netherfield (Kendal)	1–1	Chesterfield	7 December 1963
Replay	Chesterfield	4–1	Netherfield (Kendal)	11 December 1963
18	Colchester United	0–1	Queens Park Rangers	7 December 1963
19	Chelmsford City	0–1	Bedford Town	7 December 1963
20	Oxford United	2–1	Kettering Town	7 December 1963

== Third round ==
The 44 First and Second Division clubs entered the competition at this stage. The matches were scheduled for Saturday, 4 January 1964. Nine matches were drawn and went to replays, though none of these then resulted in a second replay.

Tie no	Home team	Score	Away team	Date
1	Bath City	1–1	Bolton Wanderers	4 January 1964
Replay	Bolton Wanderers	3–0	Bath City	8 January 1964
2	Burnley	1–1	Rotherham United	4 January 1964
Replay	Rotherham United	2–3	Burnley	7 January 1964
3	Liverpool	5–0	Derby County	4 January 1964
4	Southampton	2–3	Manchester United	4 January 1964
5	Yeovil Town	0–2	Bury	4 January 1964
6	Leicester City	2–3	Leyton Orient	4 January 1964
7	Nottingham Forest	0–0	Preston North End	4 January 1964
Replay	Preston North End	1–0	Nottingham Forest	13 January 1964
8	Blackburn Rovers	4–0	Grimsby Town	4 January 1964
9	Aston Villa	0–0	Aldershot	4 January 1964
Replay	Aldershot	2–1	Aston Villa	8 January 1964
10	West Bromwich Albion	2–2	Blackpool	4 January 1964
Replay	Blackpool	0–1	West Bromwich Albion	8 January 1964
11	Sunderland	2–0	Northampton Town	4 January 1964
12	Lincoln City	0–4	Sheffield United	4 January 1964
13	Swindon Town	2–1	Manchester City	4 January 1964
14	Doncaster Rovers	2–2	Bristol City	4 January 1964
Replay	Bristol City	2–0	Doncaster Rovers	7 January 1964
15	Ipswich Town	6–3	Oldham Athletic	4 January 1964
16	Newcastle United	1–2	Bedford Town	4 January 1964
17	Tottenham Hotspur	1–1	Chelsea	4 January 1964
Replay	Chelsea	2–0	Tottenham Hotspur	8 January 1964
18	Fulham	4–1	Luton Town	4 January 1964
19	Brentford	2–1	Middlesbrough	4 January 1964
20	Bristol Rovers	2–1	Norwich City	4 January 1964
21	West Ham United	3–0	Charlton Athletic	4 January 1964
22	Plymouth Argyle	0–1	Huddersfield Town	4 January 1964
23	Hull City	1–1	Everton	4 January 1964
Replay	Everton	2–1	Hull City	7 January 1964
24	Carlisle United	2–0	Queens Park Rangers	4 January 1964
25	Scunthorpe United	2–2	Barnsley	4 January 1964
Replay	Barnsley	3–2	Scunthorpe United	7 January 1964
26	Cardiff City	0–1	Leeds United	4 January 1964
27	Newport County	3–2	Sheffield Wednesday	4 January 1964
28	Swansea Town	4–1	Barrow	4 January 1964
29	Arsenal	2–1	Wolverhampton Wanderers	4 January 1964
30	Stoke City	4–1	Portsmouth	4 January 1964
31	Birmingham City	1–2	Port Vale	4 January 1964
32	Oxford United	1–0	Chesterfield	4 January 1964

== Fourth round ==
The matches were scheduled for Saturday, 25 January 1964. Eight matches were drawn and went to replays. The replays were all played two, three or four days later. Bedford Town was the last non-league club left in the competition.

Tie no	Home team	Score	Away team	Date
1	Burnley	2–1	Newport County	25 January 1964
2	Liverpool	0–0	Port Vale	25 January 1964
Replay	Port Vale	1–2	Liverpool	27 January 1964
3	Blackburn Rovers	2–0	Fulham	25 January 1964
4	Bolton Wanderers	2–2	Preston North End	25 January 1964
Replay	Preston North End	2–1	Bolton Wanderers	27 January 1964
5	West Bromwich Albion	3–3	Arsenal	25 January 1964
Replay	Arsenal	2–0	West Bromwich Albion	29 January 1964
6	Sunderland	6–1	Bristol City	25 January 1964
7	Sheffield United	1–1	Swansea Town	25 January 1964
Replay	Swansea Town	4–0	Sheffield United	28 January 1964
8	Ipswich Town	1–1	Stoke City	25 January 1964
Replay	Stoke City	1–0	Ipswich Town	29 January 1964
9	Barnsley	2–1	Bury	25 January 1964
10	Manchester United	4–1	Bristol Rovers	25 January 1964
11	Chelsea	1–2	Huddersfield Town	25 January 1964
12	Bedford Town	0–3	Carlisle United	25 January 1964
13	Leeds United	1–1	Everton	25 January 1964
Replay	Everton	2–0	Leeds United	28 January 1964
14	Aldershot	1–2	Swindon Town	25 January 1964
15	Leyton Orient	1–1	West Ham United	25 January 1964
Replay	West Ham United	3–0	Leyton Orient	29 January 1964
16	Oxford United	2–2	Brentford	25 January 1964
Replay	Brentford	1–2	Oxford United	28 January 1964

== Fifth round ==
The matches were scheduled for Saturday, 15 February 1964. The Stoke City – Swansea Town match went to a replay in the midweek fixture, with Swansea winning the tie.

Tie no	Home team	Score	Away team	Date
1	Burnley	3–0	Huddersfield Town	15 February 1964
2	Preston North End	1–0	Carlisle United	15 February 1964
3	Sunderland	3–1	Everton	15 February 1964
4	Swindon Town	1–3	West Ham United	15 February 1964
5	Barnsley	0–4	Manchester United	15 February 1964
6	Arsenal	0–1	Liverpool	15 February 1964
7	Stoke City	2–2	Swansea Town	15 February 1964
Replay	Swansea Town	2–0	Stoke City	18 February 1964
8	Oxford United	3–1	Blackburn Rovers	15 February 1964

== Sixth round ==
The four quarter-final ties were scheduled to be played on Saturday, 29 February 1964. The Manchester United–Sunderland match went to two replays before the tie was settled, in United's favour. Oxford United was appearing at this stage for the first time in only their second season as a Football League club.

Tie no	Home team	Score	Away team	Date
1	Liverpool	1–2	Swansea Town	29 February 1964
2	West Ham United	3–2	Burnley	29 February 1964
3	Manchester United	3–3	Sunderland	29 February 1964
Replay	Sunderland	2–2	Manchester United	4 March 1964
Replay	Sunderland	1–5	Manchester United	9 March 1964
4	Oxford United	1–2	Preston North End	29 February 1964

== Semi-finals ==
The semi-final matches were played on Saturday, 14 March 1964 with no replays required. Preston North End and West Ham United came through the semi-final round to meet at Wembley. Swansea Town were featuring in the semi-finals for the first time since 1926.

14 March 1964
15:00

Preston North End	2–1	Swansea Town
Dawson 54' (pen.); Singleton 75'		McLaughlin 44'

Villa Park, Birmingham
Attendance: 68,000
Referee: J. E. Carr, Sheffield
14 March 1964
15:00

West Ham United	3–1	Manchester United
Boyce 56', 62'; Hurst 79'		Law 77'

Hillsborough, Sheffield
Attendance: 65,000
Referee: K. Stokes, Newark

== Final ==
The 1964 FA Cup final was contested by Preston North End and West Ham United at Wembley on Saturday, 2 May 1964. The match finished 3–2 to West Ham, with the winning goal being scored in the 90th minute.

2 May 1964
15:00 BST

Preston North End	2–3	West Ham United
Holden 10'; Dawson 40'		Sissons 11'; Hurst 52'; Boyce 90'

Wembley, London
Attendance: 100,000
Referee: Arthur Holland

Preston North End	West Ham United
