= List of SV Werder Bremen managers =

Werder Bremen has had 24 managers since the beginning of the Bundesliga era in 1963. Otto Rehhagel served the longest term, being in office for fourteen years. Hans Tilkowski, Willi Multhaup, Rudi Assauer, and Otto Rehhagel served two terms each while Fritz Langner served three.

== Bundesliga era ==
=== Coaching statistics ===
Country	Head Coach	Competition	Matches Coached	Wins	Draws	Losses	Winning %	Years Coached	Notes
(Germany)	Willi Multhaup	Bundesliga	60	25	19	16	41.67%	1963–65	
(Germany)	Willi Multhaup	DFB Cup	2	0	0	2	0%	1963–65	
(Germany)	Willi Multhaup	Europe	—	—	—	—	—	1963–65	
(Germany)	Willi Multhaup	Total	62	25	19	16	40.32%	1963–65	
(Germany)	Günter Brocker	Bundesliga						1965–67	
(Germany)	Günter Brocker	DFB Cup						1965–67	
(Germany)	Günter Brocker	Europe						1965–67	
(Germany)	Günter Brocker	Total						1965–67	
(Germany)	Fritz Langner	Bundesliga						1967–69	
(Germany)	Fritz Langner	DFB Cup						1967–69	
(Germany)	Fritz Langner	Europe						1967–69	
(Germany)	Fritz Langner	Total						1967–69	
(Germany)	Richard Ackerschott	Bundesliga	4					1968–69	Replacement for Fritz Langner in games 11, 12, 13, and 34
(Germany)	Richard Ackerschott	DFB Cup						1968–69	Replacement for Fritz Langner in games 11, 12, 13, and 34
(Germany)	Richard Ackerschott	Europe						1968–69	Replacement for Fritz Langner in games 11, 12, 13, and 34
(Germany)	Richard Ackerschott	Total						1968–69	Replacement for Fritz Langner in games 11, 12, 13, and 34
(Germany)	Fritz Rebell	Bundesliga						1969–70	
(Germany)	Fritz Rebell	DFB Cup						1969–70	
(Germany)	Fritz Rebell	Europe						1969–70	
(Germany)	Fritz Rebell	Total						1969–70	
(Germany)	Hans Tilkowski	Bundesliga						1970	
(Germany)	Hans Tilkowski	DFB Cup						1970	
(Germany)	Hans Tilkowski	Europe						1970	
(Germany)	Hans Tilkowski	Total						1970	
(Germany)	Robert Gebhardt	Bundesliga						1970–71	
(Germany)	Robert Gebhardt	DFB Cup						1970–71	
(Germany)	Robert Gebhardt	Europe						1970–71	
(Germany)	Robert Gebhardt	Total						1970–71	
(Germany)	Willi Multhaup	Bundesliga						1971	
(Germany)	Willi Multhaup	DFB Cup						1971	
(Germany)	Willi Multhaup	Europe						1971	
(Germany)	Willi Multhaup	Total						1971	
(Germany)	Sepp Piontek	Bundesliga						1971–75	
(Germany)	Sepp Piontek	DFB Cup						1971–75	
(Germany)	Sepp Piontek	Europe						1971–75	
(Germany)	Sepp Piontek	Total						1971–75	
(Germany)	Fritz Langner	Bundesliga	2					1972	Replacement for Sepp Piontek in games 31 and 32
(Germany)	Fritz Langner	DFB Cup						1972	Replacement for Sepp Piontek in games 31 and 32
(Germany)	Fritz Langner	Europe						1972	Replacement for Sepp Piontek in games 31 and 32
(Germany)	Fritz Langner	Total						1972	Replacement for Sepp Piontek in games 31 and 32
(Germany)	Otto Rehhagel	Bundesliga						1976	
(Germany)	Otto Rehhagel	DFB Cup						1976	
(Germany)	Otto Rehhagel	Europe						1976	
(Germany)	Otto Rehhagel	Total						1976	
(Germany)	Herbert Burdenski	Bundesliga						1975–76	
(Germany)	Herbert Burdenski	DFB Cup						1975–76	
(Germany)	Herbert Burdenski	Europe						1975–76	
(Germany)	Herbert Burdenski	Total						1975–76	
(Germany)	Hans Tilkowski	Bundesliga						1976–77	
(Germany)	Hans Tilkowski	DFB Cup						1976–77	
(Germany)	Hans Tilkowski	Europe						1976–77	
(Germany)	Hans Tilkowski	Total						1976–77	
(Germany)	Rudi Assauer	Bundesliga						1977–78	In cooperation with Fred Schulz
(Germany)	Rudi Assauer	DFB Cup						1977–78	In cooperation with Fred Schulz
(Germany)	Rudi Assauer	Europe						1977–78	In cooperation with Fred Schulz
(Germany)	Rudi Assauer	Total						1977–78	In cooperation with Fred Schulz
(Germany)	Fred Schulz	Bundesliga						1978	In cooperation with Rudi Assauer
(Germany)	Fred Schulz	DFB Cup						1978	In cooperation with Rudi Assauer
(Germany)	Fred Schulz	Europe						1978	In cooperation with Rudi Assauer
(Germany)	Fred Schulz	Total						1978	In cooperation with Rudi Assauer
(Germany)	Wolfgang Weber	Bundesliga						1978–80	
(Germany)	Wolfgang Weber	DFB Cup						1978–80	
(Germany)	Wolfgang Weber	Europe						1978–80	
(Germany)	Wolfgang Weber	Total						1978–80	
(Germany)	Rudi Assauer	Bundesliga						1980	In cooperation with Fritz Langner
(Germany)	Rudi Assauer	DFB Cup						1980	In cooperation with Fritz Langner
(Germany)	Rudi Assauer	Europe						1980	In cooperation with Fritz Langner
(Germany)	Rudi Assauer	Total						1980	In cooperation with Fritz Langner
(Germany)	Fritz Langner	Bundesliga						1980	In cooperation with Rudi Assauer
(Germany)	Fritz Langner	DFB Cup						1980	In cooperation with Rudi Assauer
(Germany)	Fritz Langner	Europe						1980	In cooperation with Rudi Assauer
(Germany)	Fritz Langner	Total						1980	In cooperation with Rudi Assauer
(Germany)	Kuno Klötzer	Bundesliga	26	19	4	3	73.08%	1980–81	Otto Rehhagel took over as Manager on April 2.
(Germany)	Kuno Klötzer	DFB Cup	5	3	1	1	60%	1980–81	Otto Rehhagel took over as Manager on April 2.
(Germany)	Kuno Klötzer	Europe	—	—	—	—	—	1980–81	Otto Rehhagel took over as Manager on April 2.
(Germany)	Kuno Klötzer	Total	31	22	5	4	70.97%	1980–81	Otto Rehhagel took over as Manager on April 2.
(Germany)	Otto Rehhagel	Bundesliga	496	252	138	106	50.81%	1981–95	
(Germany)	Otto Rehhagel	DFB Cup	59	42	7	10	71.19%	1981–95	
(Germany)	Otto Rehhagel	Europe	68	32	19	17	47.06%	1981–95	
(Germany)	Otto Rehhagel	Total	623	326	164	133	52.33%	1981–95	
(Netherlands)	Aad de Mos	Bundesliga						1995–96	
(Netherlands)	Aad de Mos	DFB Cup						1995–96	
(Netherlands)	Aad de Mos	Europe						1995–96	
(Netherlands)	Aad de Mos	Total						1995–96	
(Germany)	Hans-Jürgen Dörner	Bundesliga						1996–97	
(Germany)	Hans-Jürgen Dörner	DFB Cup						1996–97	
(Germany)	Hans-Jürgen Dörner	Europe						1996–97	
(Germany)	Hans-Jürgen Dörner	Total						1996–97	
(Germany)	Wolfgang Sidka	Bundesliga	37	15	7	15	40.54%	1997–98	
(Germany)	Wolfgang Sidka	DFB Cup	3	2	0	1	66.67%	1997–98	
(Germany)	Wolfgang Sidka	Europe	11	8	2	1	72.73%	1997–98	
(Germany)	Wolfgang Sidka	Total	52	25	9	17	48.08%	1997–98	
(Germany)	Felix Magath	Bundesliga	24	6	7	11	25%	1998–99	
(Germany)	Felix Magath	DFB Pokal	3	3	0	0	100%	1998–99	
(Germany)	Felix Magath	Europe	1	0	0	1	0%	1998–99	
(Germany)	Felix Magath	Total	28	9	7	12	32.14%	1998–99	
(Germany)	Thomas Schaaf	Bundesliga	479	223	106	150	46.56%	1999–2013	
(Germany)	Thomas Schaaf	DFB Cup	53	38	7	8	71.7%	1999–2013	
(Germany)	Thomas Schaaf	Europe	99	43	23	33	43.43%	1999–2013	
(Germany)	Thomas Schaaf	Total	631	304	136	191	48.18%	1999–2013	
(Germany)	Robin Dutt	Bundesliga	43	10	13	20	23.26%	2013–14	
(Germany)	Robin Dutt	DFB Cup	2	1	0	1	50%	2013–14	
(Germany)	Robin Dutt	Europe	—	—	—	—	—	2013–14	
(Germany)	Robin Dutt	Total	45	11	13	21	24.44%	2013–14	
(Ukraine)	Viktor Skrypnyk	Bundesliga	62	21	14	27	33.87%	2014–16	
(Ukraine)	Viktor Skrypnyk	DFB Cup	8	5	0	3	62.5%	2014–16	
(Ukraine)	Viktor Skrypnyk	Europe	—	—	—	—	—	2014–16	
(Ukraine)	Viktor Skrypnyk	Total	70	26	14	30	37.14%	2014–16	
(Germany)	Alexander Nouri	Bundesliga	41	13	11	17	31.71%	2016–17	
(Germany)	Alexander Nouri	DFB Cup	2	2	0	0	100%	2016–17	
(Germany)	Alexander Nouri	Europe	—	—	—	—	—	2016–17	
(Germany)	Alexander Nouri	Total	43	15	11	17	34.88%	2016–17	
(Germany)	Florian Kohfeldt	Bundesliga	125	39	35	51	31.2%	2017–21	
(Germany)	Florian Kohfeldt	DFB Cup	16	12	1	3	75%	2017–21	
(Germany)	Florian Kohfeldt	Europe	—	—	—	—	—	2017–21	
(Germany)	Florian Kohfeldt	Total	143	50	38	55	34.97%	2017–21	
(Germany)	Markus Anfang	2.Bundesliga	13	5	4	4	38.46%	2021	
(Germany)	Markus Anfang	DFB Cup	1	0	0	1	0%	2021	
(Germany)	Markus Anfang	Europe	—	—	—	—	—	2021	
(Germany)	Markus Anfang	Total	14	5	4	5	35.71%	2021	
(Germany)	Ole Werner	Bundesliga	102	35	24	43	34.31%	2021-25	
(Germany)	Ole Werner	2.Bundesliga	19	13	4	2	68.42%	2021-25	
(Germany)	Ole Werner	DFB Cup	7	4	1	2	57.14%	2021-25	
(Germany)	Ole Werner	Europe	—	—	—	—	—	2021-25	
(Germany)	Ole Werner	Total	128	52	29	47	40.63%	2021-25	
(Germany)	Horst Steffen	Bundesliga	20	4	7	9	20%	2025-26	
(Germany)	Horst Steffen	DFB Cup	1	0	0	1	0%	2025-26	
(Germany)	Horst Steffen	Europe	—	—	—	—	—	2025-26	
(Germany)	Horst Steffen	Total	21	4	7	10	19.05%	2025-26	

=== Trophies won statistics ===
Country	Manager	Years Coached	Bundesliga	DFB Cup	European Champion Clubs' Cup	UEFA Super Cup	UEFA Cup/ UEFA Europa League	UEFA Cup Winners' Cup	Total
(Germany)	Willi Multhaup	1963–65	1 (1965)						1
(Germany)	Günter Brocker	1965–67							
(Germany)	Fritz Langner	1967–69							
(Germany)	Richard Ackerschott	1968–69							
(Germany)	Fritz Rebell	1969–70							
(Germany)	Hans Tilkowski	1970							
(Germany)	Robert Gebhardt	1970–71							
(Germany)	Willi Multhaup	1971							
(Germany)	Sepp Piontek	1971–75							
(Germany)	Fritz Langner	1972							
(Germany)	Otto Rehhagel	1976							
(Germany)	Herbert Burdenski	1975–76							
(Germany)	Hans Tilkowski	1976–77							
(Germany)	Rudi Assauer	1977–78							
(Germany)	Fred Schulz	1978							
(Germany)	Wolfgang Weber	1978–80							
(Germany)	Rudi Assauer	1980							
(Germany)	Fritz Langner	1980							
(Germany)	Kuno Klötzer	1980–81							
(Germany)	Otto Rehhagel	1981–95	2 (1988, 1993)	2 (1991, 1994)				1 (1992)	5
(Netherlands)	Aad de Mos	1995–96							
(Germany)	Hans-Jürgen Dörner	1996–97							
(Germany)	Wolfgang Sidka	1997–98							
(Germany)	Felix Magath	1998–99							
(Germany)	Thomas Schaaf	1999–2013	1 (2004)	3 (1999, 2004, 2009)					4
(Germany)	Robin Dutt	2013–14							
(Ukraine)	Viktor Skrypnyk	2014–16							
(Germany)	Alexander Nouri	2016–17							
(Germany)	Florian Kohfeldt	2017–							
