= Monument to Tofiq Bahramov =

Monument in Azerbaijan

- Azerbaijani: Tofiq Bəhramovun heykəli
- 40°23′54″N 49°51′14″E
- Location: Baku, Azerbaijan
- Designer: Mamednijat Salakhov
- Type: Memorial
- Opening date: October 13, 2004
- Dedicated to: Tofiq Bahramov

Monument to Tofiq Bahramov (Azerbaijani: Tofiq Bəhramovun heykəli) is a monument to the Azerbaijani Soviet referee and judge of international category Tofiq Bahramov. It is located in the front of the training centre building next to the Baku Republican Stadium, named after Bahramov. The sculptor Mamednijat Salakhov is the author of the monument. This is the world's first monument to a football referee.

== History ==
According to Akif Ismayilov, the director of the Republican Stadium, by the end of May 2004, the competition for the best work to create a monument to Tofiq Bahramov was completed. Out of the 12 sculpture projects presented by eight contestants, the work of Mammadnijat Salakhov, who received an award of 5 million manat, was recognized as the best. The competent jury approved the full-length sculpture of Tofiq Bahramov with an outstretched hand as if pointing towards the centre of the field.

The monument was unveiled on 13 October 2004 before the meeting of the Azerbaijani national team with the England team in the qualifying round of the 2006 FIFA World Cup, right in front of the stadium named after Tofiq Bahramov. At the inauguration ceremony, speeches were made by AFFA President, Ramiz Mirzayev, and the Minister of Youth, Sports and Tourism, Abulfaz Garayev who congratulated the audience on this event on behalf of the President of Azerbaijan, President of the National Olympic Committee, Ilham Aliyev. Also at the ceremony was a member of the England national team, Geoff Hurst, who scored the decisive goal against West Germany in the 1966 World Cup final, a match judged by Tofiq Bahramov. The monument was inaugurated by Hurst himself.

The monument’s unveiling was also attended by the FIFA President, Joseph Blatter, and the Executive Committee member, Michel Platini. At the end of the ceremony, Blatter laid a wreath at the monument to Tofiq Bahramov.

On 6 June 2011, within the framework of the celebration of the 100th anniversary of Azerbaijani football, Hurst again visited the monument, alongside the West German goalkeeper, Hans Tilkowski, who conceded the goal given by Bahramov.

== See also ==
- Tofiq Bahramov
- Tofiq Bahramov Republican Stadium
