= Geoff Hurst =

English footballer (born 1941)

Sir Geoff Hurst MBE
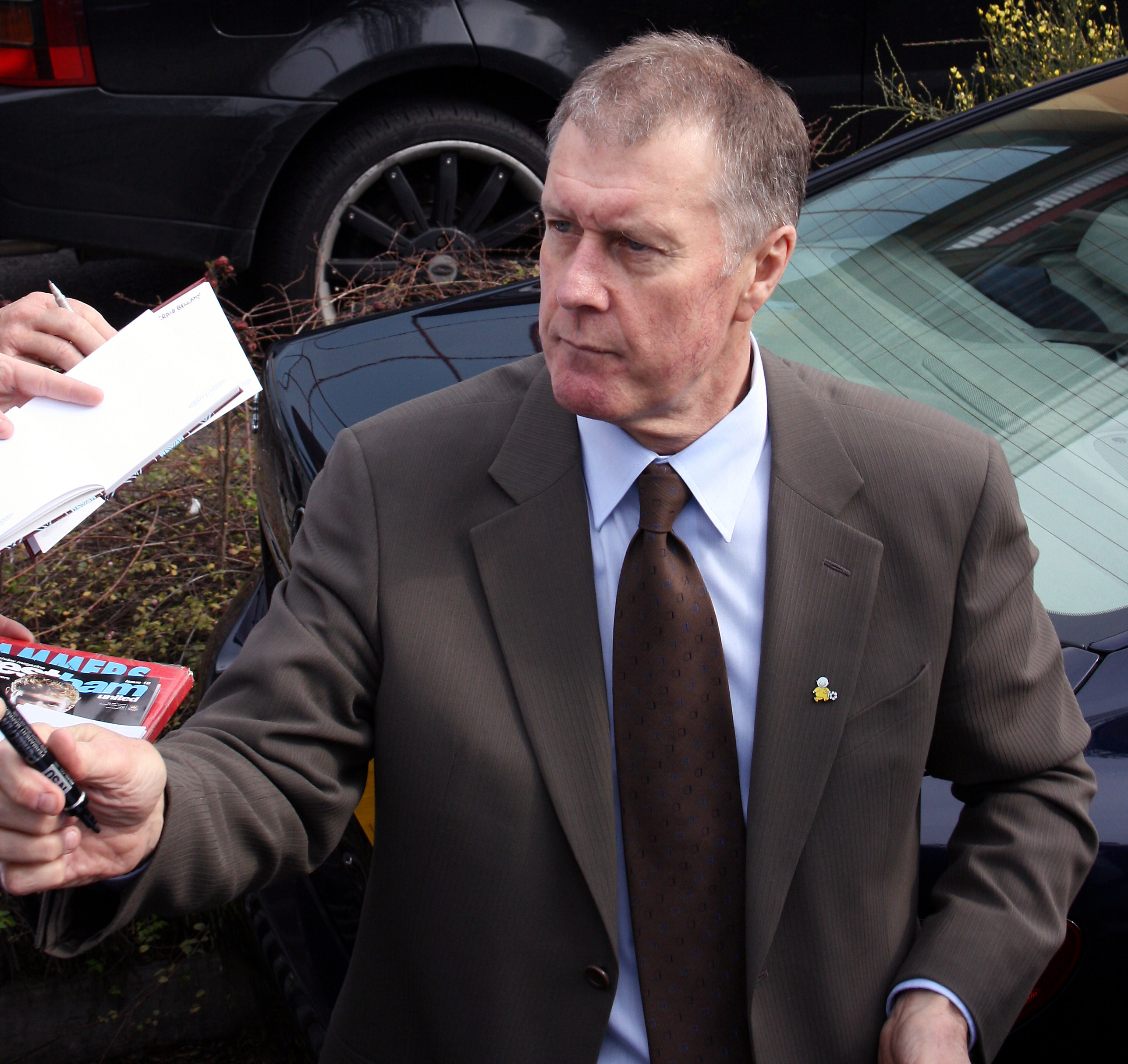
- Hurst signing autographs outside Upton Park in 2008

Personal information
- Full name: Geoffrey Charles Hurst
- Date of birth: 8 December 1941 (age 84)
- Place of birth: Ashton-under-Lyne, Lancashire, England
- Height: 5 ft 11 1/2 in (1.82 m)
- Position: Striker

Youth career
- 1957–1959: West Ham United

Senior career*
Years	Team	Apps	(Gls)
1958–1972	West Ham United	411	(180)
1972–1975	Stoke City	108	(30)
1973	→ Cape Town City (loan)	6	(5)
1975–1976	West Bromwich Albion	10	(2)
1976	Cork Celtic	3	(3)
1976	Seattle Sounders	23	(8)
1976–1979	Telford United		
Total		561	(228)

International career
1959	England youth	6	(0)
1963–1964	England U23	4	(1)
1966–1972	England	49	(24)
1966–1972	The Football League XI	7	(4)

Managerial career
- 1976–1979: Telford United
- 1979–1981: Chelsea
- 1982–1984: Kuwait SC
Medal record
Men's football
Representing England
FIFA World Cup
Winner	1966 England
UEFA European Championship
Third place	1968 Italy
- Cricket career
Cricket information
- Batting: Right-handed
- Role: Wicket-keeper
Domestic team information
- Years: Team
- 1962: Essex
- Only First-class: 30 May 1962 Essex v Lancashire
Career statistics
Competition	First-class
Matches	1
Runs scored	0
Batting average	0.00
100s/50s	0/0
Top score	0*
Catches/stumpings	1/–
- Source: CricInfo, 21 October 2016
Signature
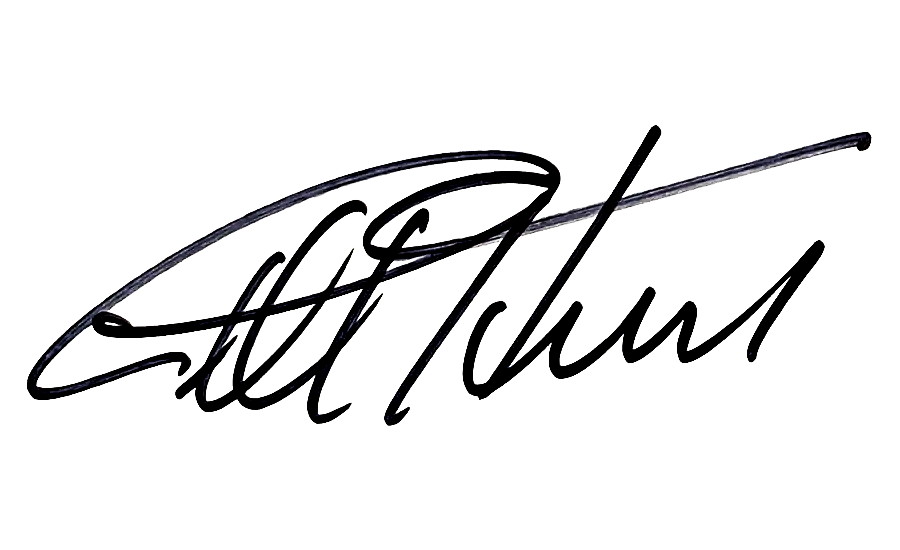
- * Club domestic league appearances and goals

Sir Geoffrey Charles Hurst (born 8 December 1941) is an English former professional footballer. A striker, he became the first player to score a hat-trick in a World Cup final, as England recorded a 4–2 victory over West Germany at Wembley in 1966.

Hurst began his career with West Ham United, where he scored 242 goals in 500 first team appearances. There he won the FA Cup in 1964 and the European Cup Winners' Cup in 1965. He was sold to Stoke City in 1972 for £80,000 (equivalent to £900,000 in 2025). After three seasons with Stoke, where he won the Watney Cup in 1973, he finished his Football League career with West Bromwich Albion in 1976. Hurst went to play football in Ireland (Cork Celtic) and the United States (Seattle Sounders), before returning to England to manage non-league Telford United. He also coached in the England set-up before a two-year stint as Chelsea manager from 1979 to 1981. He later coached Kuwait SC, before leaving the game to concentrate on his business commitments.

In total, Hurst scored 24 goals in 49 England appearances, and as well as success in the 1966 World Cup he also appeared at UEFA Euro 1968 and the 1970 FIFA World Cup. He also had a brief cricket career, making one first-class appearance for Essex in 1962, before concentrating on football.

== Early life ==
Hurst was born in Ashton-under-Lyne, Lancashire, England, on 8 December 1941. He had two younger siblings: Diane and Robert. His family moved to Chelmsford, Essex when he was six years old. His father, Charlie Hurst, was a professional footballer who played at centre-half for Bristol Rovers, Oldham Athletic and Rochdale. His mother, Evelyn Hopkins, was from a Gloucestershire family, with her mother's side originally from Germany. As a teenager he was obsessed with football, and was once fined £1 for disturbing the peace after persistently kicking a football into his neighbour's garden.

Hurst played one first-class cricket match for Essex, against Lancashire at Aigburth in 1962, although it was not a successful outing: he made 0 not out in the first innings, and was bowled by Colin Hilton, again for 0, in the second. However, he appeared 23 times in the Essex Second XI between 1962 and 1964, usually as a wicket-keeper, before concentrating entirely on football.

Under his father's management of the club, Hurst played once for Halstead Town reserves at the age of "about 14".

== Club career ==
=== West Ham United ===
Hurst's football career began when he was apprenticed to West Ham United at the age of 15. He played alongside Bobby Moore in the 1959 FA Youth Cup final team that lost to Blackburn Rovers (1–2 on aggregate), but both were also in the team that won the Southern Junior Floodlit Cup (1–0 v Chelsea) later that year. Manager Ted Fenton first selected him for a senior game in a Southern Floodlit Cup tie with Fulham in December 1958. He turned professional at the club four months later, and was paid £7 a week with a £20 signing-on fee. His first competitive appearance came in February 1960 when injuries forced Fenton's hand; Hurst put in an indifferent performance and the team lost 3–1. He made only two further appearances in the 1959–60 season, and realised that Bobby Moore was making better progress in the same position than he was. He played six times in the 1960–61 campaign and seriously considered turning his main focus to cricket. In April 1961 Ron Greenwood took over as manager, and drastically changed team training by putting a focus on footballing skill rather than physical fitness.

Hurst missed the start of 1961–62 pre-season training due to his cricketing commitments, but went on to make 24 appearances at left-half, and scored his first goal for the club in a 4–2 victory over Wolverhampton Wanderers in December 1961. However, he again missed pre-season training the following summer and was dropped after proving to be unfit during the opening game of the 1962–63 season. In September of that season Greenwood tried playing Hurst as a striker, after deciding that the defensive side of his game was a weakness for the young midfielder. He formed a successful partnership with Johnny Byrne and went on to score 13 goals in 27 First Division games whilst Byrne scored nine in 30 games in the 1962–63 season. In the summer of 1963 he joined the club on their pre-season tour of New York, and greatly benefited from playing against top-quality players from clubs across the world in the International Soccer League, a friendly tournament.

Hurst and West Ham had a poor start to the 1963–64 season, and went on to finish in 14th place. However, it was in the FA Cup where the team impressed. A comfortable 3–0 home win over Second Division Charlton Athletic was followed by another 3–0 home win over East End rivals Leyton Orient – though only following a tough 1–1 draw at Brisbane Road. Greenwood named the same 11 players, including Hurst, in all the club's seven FA Cup fixtures as West Ham progressed to the final. Hurst scored one against Charlton and two against Orient, and claimed another goal in the fifth round as West Ham beat Second Division Swindon Town 3–1 at the County Ground. Burnley provided a stern test in the quarter-finals, but a 3–2 home win took West Ham into the semi-finals, where they faced Manchester United at Hillsborough. West Ham won 3–1, with Hurst scoring the final goal of the game after being set up by Bobby Moore. West Ham faced Second Division Preston North End at Wembley in the 1964 FA Cup Final, and had to come from behind twice to win the match 3–2. Hurst scored his side's second equaliser with a header that bounced under the crossbar and ended up just over the goal line.

The club's success won them a place in the European Cup Winners Cup for the 1964–65 season. They defeated Belgian side K.A.A. Gent in the First Round after an unconvincing 2–1 aggregate victory. Czechoslovak side AC Sparta Prague awaited in the second round, and West Ham progressed with a 3–2 aggregate victory despite the absence of Moore. Despite beating Swiss team FC Lausanne-Sport 6–4 on aggregate in the quarter-finals, Hurst had still not registered a goal in the competition as he was played in a withdrawn role behind Johnny Byrne so as to strengthen the midfield. In the semi-finals, West Ham defended a 2–1 home win over Spanish club Real Zaragoza with a 1–1 draw at La Romareda to claim a place in the 1965 European Cup Winners' Cup Final against TSV 1860 München at Wembley. West Ham won 2–0, Alan Sealey scoring both goals, to give the club their first European trophy.

Having scored 40 goals in 59 competitive games in the 1965–66 season and then gone on to make himself a household name by winning the World Cup with England, Hurst was the subject of a £200,000 (equivalent to £3.3 million in 2025) transfer offer by Manchester United manager Matt Busby – the offer was rejected by Greenwood. He was in the West Ham side which lost the League Cup final, 5–3 on aggregate to West Bromwich Albion.

In the 1966–67 season, West Ham demonstrated the inconsistency that would deny them a realistic prospect of winning a league championship under Greenwood. Hurst scored a hat-trick as they defeated full-strength title challengers Leeds United 7–0 in the League Cup, but they exited the FA Cup with a 3–1 defeat to Third Division side Swindon Town.

"When you're playing for a team that can score seven one day and four the next it's really quite good fun. When job satisfaction is that high, why would you want to play for anyone else?"

— Like his manager, Ron Greenwood, Hurst valued entertaining attacking football played in a fair manner and was not prepared to sacrifice these values for silverware.

Hurst scored six goals in a First Division match against Sunderland at Upton Park on 19 October 1968, which West Ham won 8–0. However, he regretted admitting that he handled the ball in his first goal which led to the back page headlines focusing on the illegitimate goal rather than the rare feat of one player scoring six goals in one game.

In 1972, West Ham reached the semi-finals of the League Cup when they played Stoke City over two legs. In the home leg at Upton Park, they were awarded a penalty after Harry Redknapp was fouled in the box. Hurst took the penalty and struck a powerful shot into the top corner which was saved by Gordon Banks, who succeeded in deflecting the ball over the bar. Stoke won the tie in the subsequent replay and denied Hurst one more final appearance at Wembley.

=== Stoke City ===
Hurst was sold to Stoke City for a £80,000 fee in August 1972. He was struck down with pneumonia early in 1973 and went to South Africa to recover, playing on loan for Roy Bailey's Cape Town City. He missed just four games for Stoke and upon his return he helped the side to maintain their First Division status.

In January 1974, "Potters" manager Tony Waddington asked Hurst to take in new signing Alan Hudson as a lodger so as to provide the talented but troubled midfielder with a stable home during his Stoke career. Hudson adapted well to life in the Hurst household and Stoke recorded a fifth place in the 1973–74 season – a career high for Hurst.

Hurst scored 11 goals in 41 games in the 1974–75 season and helped Stoke to finish in fifth place, just four points behind champions Derby County.

=== West Bromwich Albion ===
Hurst was sold to Johnny Giles's West Bromwich Albion in the summer of 1975 for a fee of £20,000. He played 12 times for the Baggies at the start of the 1975–76 season, scoring twice, before deciding to leave for America. Hurst later acknowledged that at the age of 34 he was too old to lead the line in the "Baggies" push for promotion out of the Second Division.

=== Later career ===
Hurst signed for Cork Celtic in January 1976, and remained in Ireland for one month.

He signed for the Seattle Sounders of the NASL in 1976. Hurst rapidly proved his worth, and became a valuable member of the Sounders team. He was the team's second-leading scorer, helping the Sounders make it to the play-offs for the first time in their brief history, with eight goals and four assists in 23 regular season games, and one goal in the play-offs.

== International career ==
=== 1966 World Cup ===
Hurst made his senior England debut against West Germany on 23 February 1966. He played well, and further performances against Scotland and Yugoslavia secured him a place in the squad for the 1966 FIFA World Cup. However, he put in mediocre performances in warm-up games against Finland and Denmark, and so Jimmy Greaves and Roger Hunt were instead picked for the final friendly game against Poland. Greaves and Hunt were picked for the three group games against Uruguay, Mexico and France, but in the latter game, Greaves suffered a deep gash to his leg which required stitches, and Hurst was called up to take his place in the quarter-final against Argentina.

Argentina were talented but preferred a tougher approach to the game, which saw them reduced to ten men. The game was still tightly contested as it entered its final 15 minutes, before Martin Peters swung over a curling cross from the left flank and Hurst, anticipating his clubmate's action, got in front of his marker to glance a near post header past the Argentine keeper. England won 1–0 and were in the semi-finals.

Greaves was not fit for the game against Portugal so Hurst and Hunt continued up front, and England won 2–1 thanks to two goals by Bobby Charlton, the second of which was set up by Hurst. As the final against the Germans approached, the media learnt of Greaves' return to fitness and, while appreciating Hurst's contribution, started to call for the return of England's most prolific centre forward. Ramsey, however, would not be swayed and selected Hurst for the final.

==== World Cup Final ====
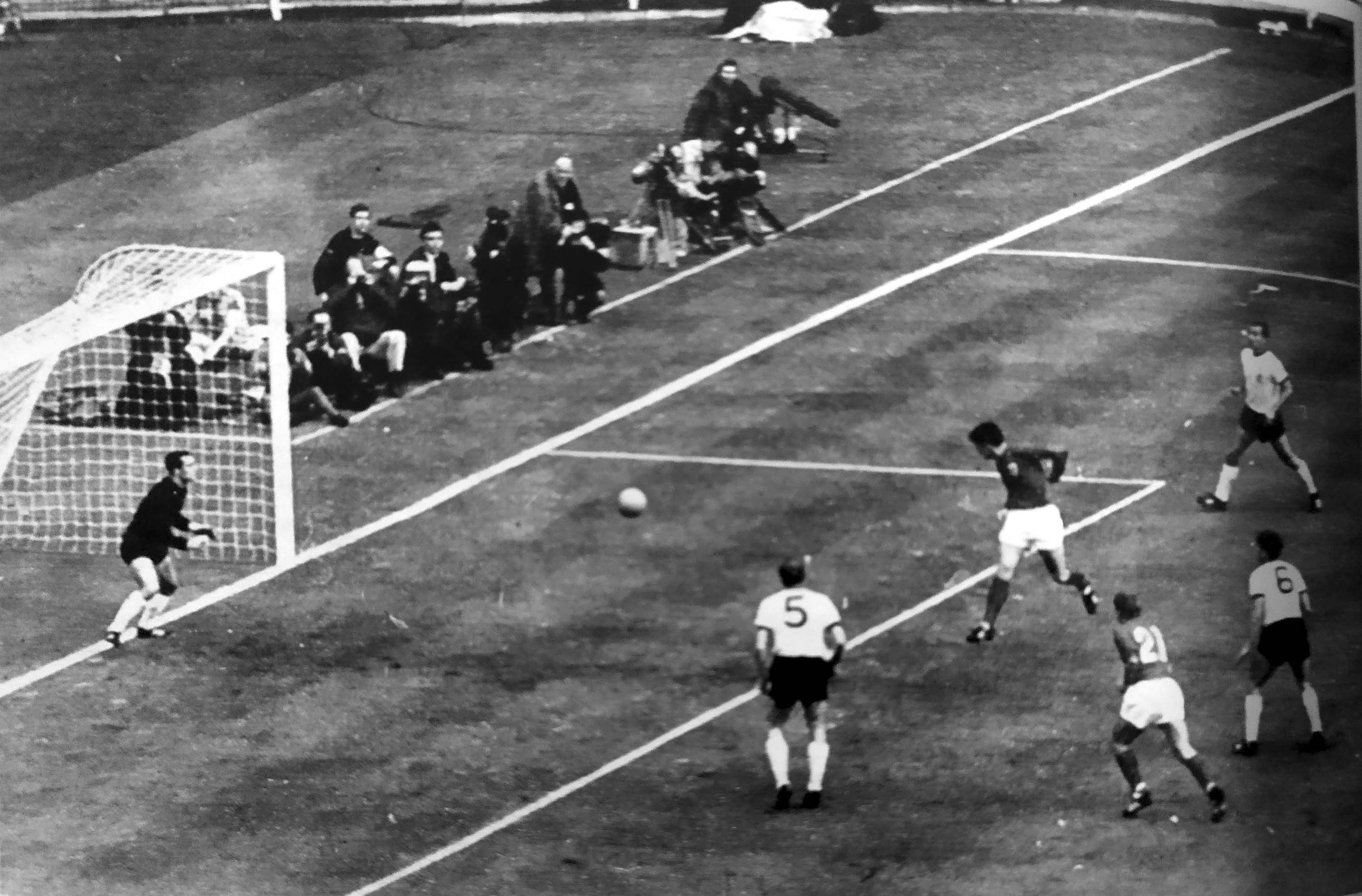
Hurst heading for England's first goal at the 1966 World Cup final.

West Germany took the lead through Helmut Haller early on, but six minutes later Bobby Moore was fouled just inside the German half of the field. He quickly picked himself up and delivered the free kick to Hurst, who eluded his marker Horst-Dieter Höttges and headed the ball past goalkeeper Hans Tilkowski to level the scores at 1–1.

With 12 minutes left to play of normal time, an Alan Ball corner left Hurst with a shooting opportunity on the edge of the penalty area; his shot deflected off Wolfgang Weber and fell kindly to Martin Peters, who put the ball into the net to give England the lead. However the Germans scored a very late goal through Weber to level the match at 2–2 at full-time.

In the first period of extra-time, Ball crossed from the right to Hurst, who struck a strong shot towards goal with his right foot, falling backwards as he did so. The ball beat the goalkeeper, hit the crossbar and bounced down before Weber headed it out for a corner. England's players claimed a goal while the Germans were adamant that the ball had not fully crossed the line. Referee Gottfried Dienst consulted his linesman on the right flank, Tofiq Bahramov, who signalled that the ball had crossed the line, and the goal was given. The so-called Wembley Goal remained a subject for controversy and discussions.

The Germans pushed forward in search of an equaliser as the full-time whistle approached, and Bobby Moore exploited their advanced position to send Hurst a long ball in the German half of the pitch. Hurst reached the German penalty box and scored to end the game at 4–2 to England. As Hurst collected the pass, BBC commentator Kenneth Wolstenholme delivered with one of the most famous pieces of football commentary:

And here comes Hurst, he's got ... [notices invaders] ... some people are on the pitch, they think it's all over! [Hurst shoots and scores] ... It is now! It's four!

Hurst thus became the first player to score a hat-trick in the Men's World Cup final, a feat that remained unmatched until the 2022 final, when Kylian Mbappé scored a hat-trick for France against Argentina. As France lost on penalties, Hurst remains the only man to score a winning hat-trick in a World Cup Final.

=== Later international career ===
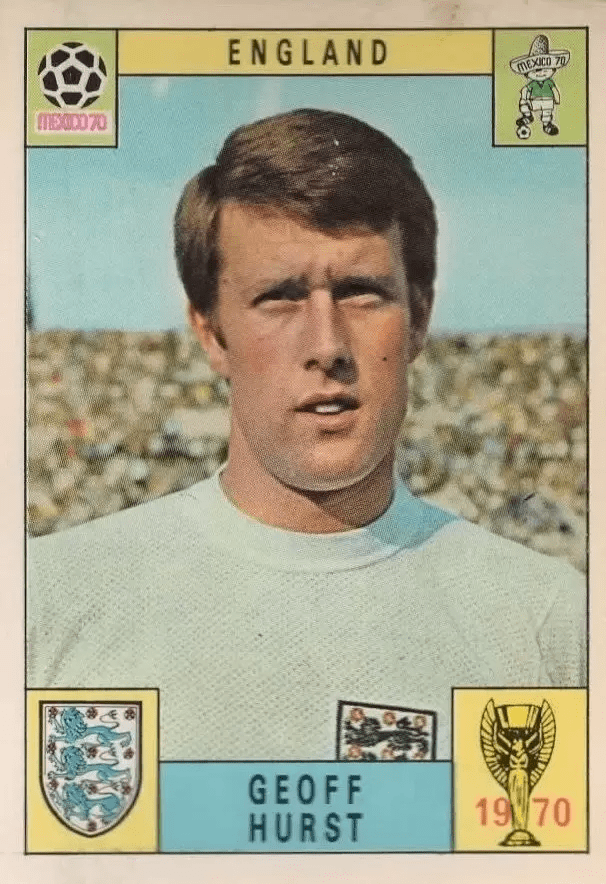
Hurst's trading card from the Mexico 70 series issued by Panini

Hurst was selected for UEFA Euro 1968, but did not play as England lost 1–0 to Yugoslavia in the semi-final. He did play, and score, in the 2–0 third-place play-off victory over the Soviet Union at the Stadio Olimpico.

Hurst scored his second international hat-trick on 12 March 1969, in a 5–0 victory over France, and was named in the Ramsey squad which played in Mexico to defend the World Cup in 1970. He scored the only goal of England's opening game against Romania after being sent through by a pass from Francis Lee. England progressed to the quarter-finals, where once again they faced West Germany. Hurst played a part in the Martin Peters goal that put England 2–0 up. With England up 2–1, Hurst's contested header trickled inches past the post. Later, at 2–2, Hurst had what many thought was a legitimate goal ruled out for offside. The West Germans scored in extra time and won 3–2.

Hurst scored against Greece and Switzerland in qualification for UEFA Euro 1972, but played his last international match on 29 April 1972 as England were beaten 3–1 by West Germany – he was replaced by Rodney Marsh with 20 minutes left to play and did not take to the field in an England shirt again. He was named in the squad for the second leg against West Germany after Allan Clarke and Francis Lee picked up injuries, but had to pull out of the squad after picking up an injury himself.

== Managerial career ==
Upon his retirement from playing, Hurst moved into management and coaching. He spent three years as player-manager of Telford United in the Southern League before being recruited by Ron Greenwood in the England coaching set up in 1977. He travelled with England to help Greenwood at UEFA Euro 1980 and the 1982 FIFA World Cup, where England qualified from their group with maximum points before being eliminated following two goalless draws in an additional group stage that preceded the semi-finals.

=== Chelsea ===
Hurst joined Chelsea, then in the Second Division, before the 1979–80 season, initially as assistant manager to Danny Blanchflower. When Blanchflower was sacked, Hurst was appointed manager. He hired Bobby Gould as his assistant. Things initially went well, and for much of the season Chelsea were on course for promotion, but two wins from their final seven league games ensured the club finished fourth; missing out on third place and promotion on goal difference. He raised £250,000 through the sales of Eamonn Bannon, David Stride and Trevor Aylott. He then spent £300,000 on Colin Lee, Dennis Rofe and Colin Viljoen; he later acknowledged Viljoen as a mistake whilst bemoaning Lee's bad luck with injury.

The following season again began well, with the "Blues" among the early promotion pace-setters before a dismal run set in, with Chelsea winning just three of their final 23 league matches, culminating in Hurst being sacked and Chelsea finished 12th in the league.

=== Kuwait SC ===
After being sacked from Chelsea on 23 April 1981, Hurst worked as an insurance salesman for Abbey Life. The next year he was tempted back into management after being offered a generous salary by Kuwait SC. He controversially disciplined and dropped club captain Saad Al-Houti, but was unable to challenge Dave Mackay's Al-Arabi for dominance of the Kuwaiti Premier League. After leaving Kuwait in April 1984 he returned to the insurance trade.

== Legacy ==
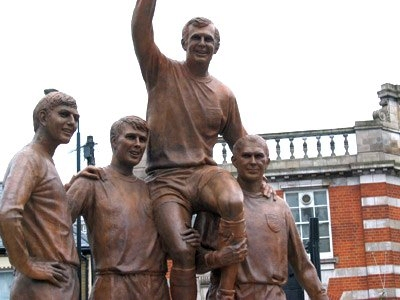
World Cup Sculpture – Hurst is second from left

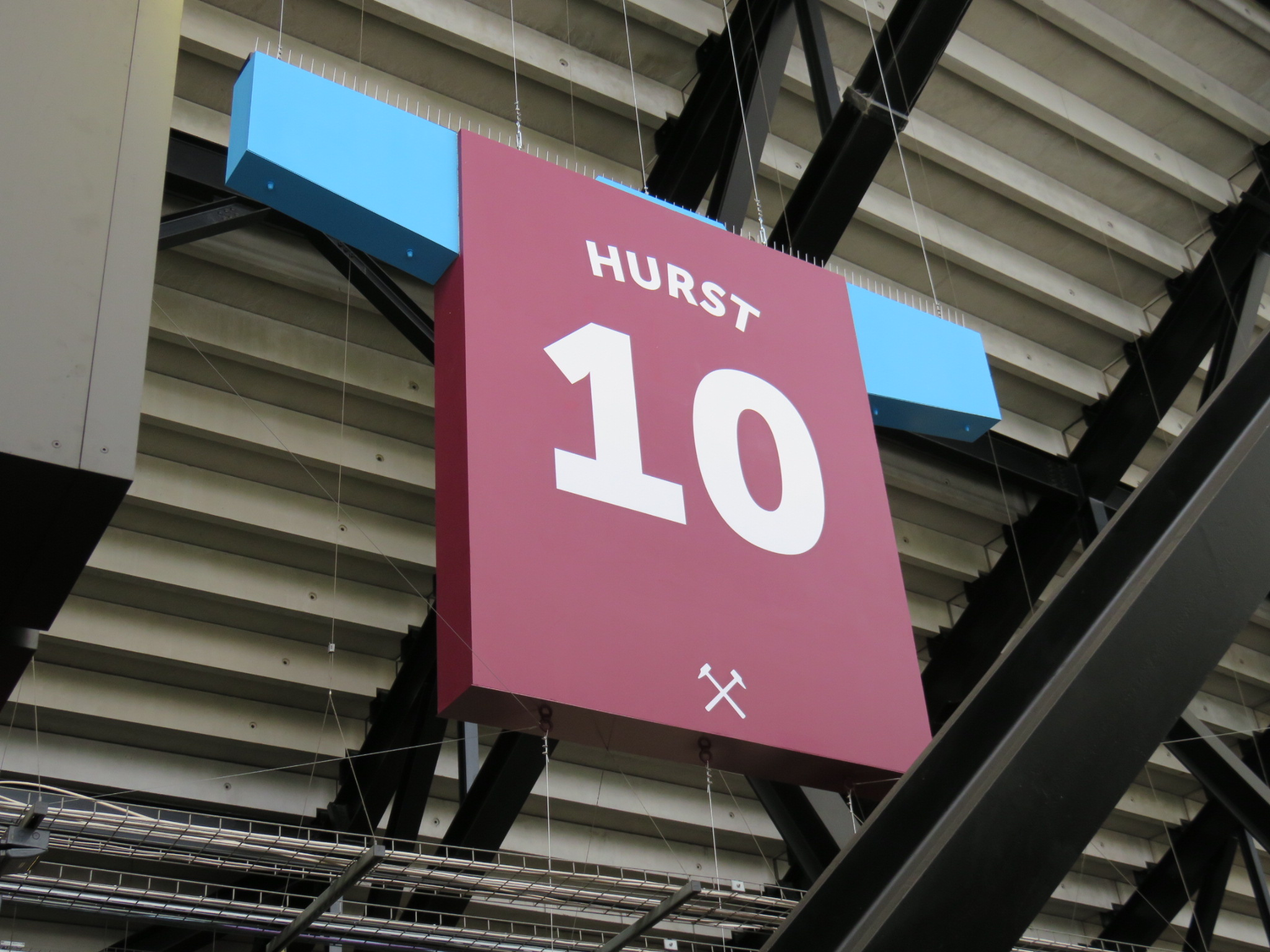
A model shirt bearing Hurst's name at the London Stadium

In 2003 Hurst was included in The Champions, a statue of 1966 World Cup winning footballers, by sculptor Philip Jackson. It sits at the junctions of Barking Road and Central Park Road, Newham, London, near to the site of West Ham United's former home stadium, the Boleyn Ground and features Martin Peters, Hurst, Bobby Moore and Ray Wilson.

Hurst's contribution to the English game was recognised in 2004 when he was inducted in the English Football Hall of Fame. Hurst is also one of the few footballers who have been knighted.

A statue of Hurst was unveiled outside Curzon Ashton F.C.'s ground in 2010. He is shown alongside two other World Cup winners born in the area, fellow 1966 squad member Jimmy Armfield, and Simone Perrotta, who won it with Italy in 2006.

In 2021, West Ham unveiled a statue outside their home ground, the London Stadium depicting Hurst with Bobby Moore and Martin Peters in tribute to the three and West Ham's 1965 European Cup Winners' Cup final victory.

Following the death of Bobby Charlton in October 2023, Hurst is the last surviving English player who played in the 1966 World Cup Final.

== Personal life ==
As of 2026, Hurst lived in Cheltenham, Gloucestershire, with his wife Judith. They have been married since 13 October 1964, having met three years previously at a youth centre; Eddie Presland was best man. They had three daughters but the eldest, Claire, died in 2010 after a ten-year long battle against a brain tumour. Hurst had one brother, Robert, who died by suicide in 1974.

In November 2020, Hurst offered to donate his brain after his death for research into dementia. This followed the deaths of several of his 1966 World Cup winning colleagues, Jack Charlton, Martin Peters, Ray Wilson, Nobby Stiles after suffering with the disease (also Bobby Charlton who died later).

While playing for Stoke City F.C. Hurst owned the Royal Oak Inn, Eccleshall.

In 2026, Hurst became a brand ambassador for precious metals company Solomon Global.

== Career statistics ==
=== Club ===
Appearances and goals by club, season and competition
Club	Season	League			FA Cup		League Cup		Other		Total	
Club	Season	Division	Apps	Goals	Apps	Goals	Apps	Goals	Apps	Goals	Apps	Goals
West Ham United	1959–60	First Division	3	0	0	0	0	0	—		3	0
West Ham United	1960–61	First Division	6	0	0	0	0	0	—		6	0
West Ham United	1961–62	First Division	24	1	1	0	2	0	—		27	1
West Ham United	1962–63	First Division	27	13	0	0	2	2	—		29	15
West Ham United	1963–64	First Division	37	14	7	7	6	5	—		50	26
West Ham United	1964–65	First Division	42	17	1	2	1	0	10 (Note: Nine appearances and goal in European Cup Winner's Cup and one appearance in Charity Shield)	1	54	20
West Ham United	1965–66	First Division	39	23	4	4	10	11	6 (Note: Appearances in European Cup Winner's Cup)	2	59	40
West Ham United	1966–67	First Division	41	29	2	3	6	9	—		49	41
West Ham United	1967–68	First Division	38	19	3	1	3	5	—		44	25
West Ham United	1968–69	First Division	42	25	3	2	3	4	—		48	31
West Ham United	1969–70	First Division	39	16	1	0	2	2	—		42	18
West Ham United	1970–71	First Division	39	15	0	0	2	0	—		41	15
West Ham United	1971–72	First Division	34	8	4	4	10	4	—		48	16
West Ham United	Total		411	180	26	23	47	42	16	3	500	248
Stoke City	1971–72	First Division	0	0	1	0	0	0	0	0	1	0
Stoke City	1972–73	First Division	38	10	0	0	3	2	2 (Note: Appearances in UEFA Cup)	1	43	13
Stoke City	1973–74	First Division	35	12	1	0	4	1	5 (Note: Two appearances in the Texaco Cup and three appearances and two goals in Watney Cup)	2	45	15
Stoke City	1974–75	First Division	35	8	1	0	4	3	1	0	38	8
Stoke City	Total		108	30	3	0	11	6	8	3	130	39
Cape Town City (loan)	1972–73	NFL	6	5	0	0	0	0	—		6	5
West Bromwich Albion	1975–76	Second Division	10	2	0	0	2	0	—		12	2
Cork Celtic	1975–76	League of Ireland	3	3	0	0	—		—		3	3
Seattle Sounders	1976	NASL	23	8	0	0	0	0	1 (Note: One appearance and one goal in NASL playoffs)	1	24	9
Career total			561	228	29	23	60	48	25	7	675	300

=== International ===
Appearances and goals by national team and year
National team	Year	Apps	Goals
England	1966	11	7
England	1967	6	2
England	1968	6	2
England	1969	8	7
England	1970	11	3
England	1971	6	3
England	1972	1	0
Total		49	24

Scores and results list England's goal tally first, score column indicates score after each Hurst goal.

List of international goals scored by Geoff Hurst
No.	Date	Venue	Opponent	Score	Result	Competition
1	2 April 1966	Hampden Park, Glasgow, Scotland	Scotland	1–0	4–3	1965–66 British Home Championship
2	23 July 1966	Wembley Stadium, London, England	Argentina	1–0	1–0	1966 FIFA World Cup
3	30 July 1966	Wembley Stadium, London, England	West Germany	1–1	4–2 (a.e.t)	1966 FIFA World Cup Final
4	30 July 1966	Wembley Stadium, London, England	West Germany	3–2	4–2 (a.e.t)	1966 FIFA World Cup Final
5	30 July 1966	Wembley Stadium, London, England	West Germany	4–2	4–2 (a.e.t)	1966 FIFA World Cup Final
6	16 November 1966	Wembley Stadium, London, England	Wales	1–0	5–1	1966–67 British Home Championship
7	16 November 1966	Wembley Stadium, London, England	Wales	2–0	5–1	1966–67 British Home Championship
8	15 April 1967	Wembley Stadium, London, England	Scotland	2–3	2–3	1966–67 British Home Championship
9	22 November 1967	Wembley Stadium, London, England	Northern Ireland	1–0	2–0	1967–68 British Home Championship
10	8 June 1968	Stadio Olimpico, Rome, Italy	Soviet Union	2–0	2–0	UEFA Euro 1968
11	11 December 1968	Wembley Stadium, London, England	Bulgaria	1–1	1–1	Friendly
12	12 March 1969	Wembley Stadium, London, England	France	2–0	5–0	Friendly
13	12 March 1969	Wembley Stadium, London, England	France	3–0	5–0	Friendly
14	12 March 1969	Wembley Stadium, London, England	France	5–0	5–0	Friendly
15	3 May 1969	Windsor Park, Belfast, Northern Ireland	Northern Ireland	3–1	3–1	1968–69 British Home Championship
16	10 May 1969	Wembley Stadium, London, England	Scotland	2–0	4–1	1968–69 British Home Championship
17	10 May 1969	Wembley Stadium, London, England	Scotland	3–1	4–1	1968–69 British Home Championship
18	8 June 1969	Estadio Centenario, Montevideo, Uruguay	Uruguay	2–1	2–1	Friendly
19	25 February 1970	Constant Vanden Stock Stadium, Brussels, Belgium	Belgium	2–0	3–1	Friendly
20	21 April 1970	Wembley Stadium, London, England	Northern Ireland	2–1	3–1	1969–70 British Home Championship
21	2 June 1970	Estadio Jalisco, Guadalajara, Mexico	Romania	1–0	1–0	1970 FIFA World Cup
22	21 April 1971	Wembley Stadium, London, England	Greece	2–0	3–0	UEFA Euro 1972 qualification
23	13 October 1971	St. Jakob-Park, Basel, Switzerland	Switzerland	1–0	3–2	UEFA Euro 1972 qualification
24	1 December 1971	Karaiskakis Stadium, Athens, Greece	Greece	1–0	2–0	UEFA Euro 1972 qualification

== Managerial statistics ==
Managerial record by team and tenure
Team	From	To	Record				
Team	From	To	P	W	D	L	Win %
Chelsea	13 September 1979	23 April 1981	84	35	20	29	41.7
Total			84	35	20	29	41.7

== Honours ==
West Ham United

- FA Cup: 1963–64
- FA Charity Shield: 1964 (shared)
- European Cup Winners' Cup: 1964–65
- Football League Cup runner-up: 1965–66

England

- FIFA World Cup: 1966
- UEFA European Championship third place: 1968

Individual

- West Ham United Hammer of the Year: 1965–66, 1966–67, 1968–69
- Football League Cup top scorer: 1963–64, 1965–66, 1966–67
- Ballon d'Or Nominated: 1966, 1967, 1970
- World Soccer World XI: 1967, 1968, 1969
- UEFA Euro Team of the Tournament: 1968
- Rothman's Golden Boot Awards: 1970
- Football League 100 Legends: 1998
- FWA Tribute Award: 1998
- English Football Hall of Fame: 2004

Orders

- Member of the Order of the British Empire: 1979
- Knight Bachelor: 1998

== See also ==
- List of FIFA World Cup top goalscorers

== Bibliography ==
- Hamilton, Duncan (2023). Answered Prayers: England and the 1966 World Cup. United Kingdom: Quercus Publishing. ISBN 9781529419986.
