= Hans Tilkowski =

German footballer (1935–2020)

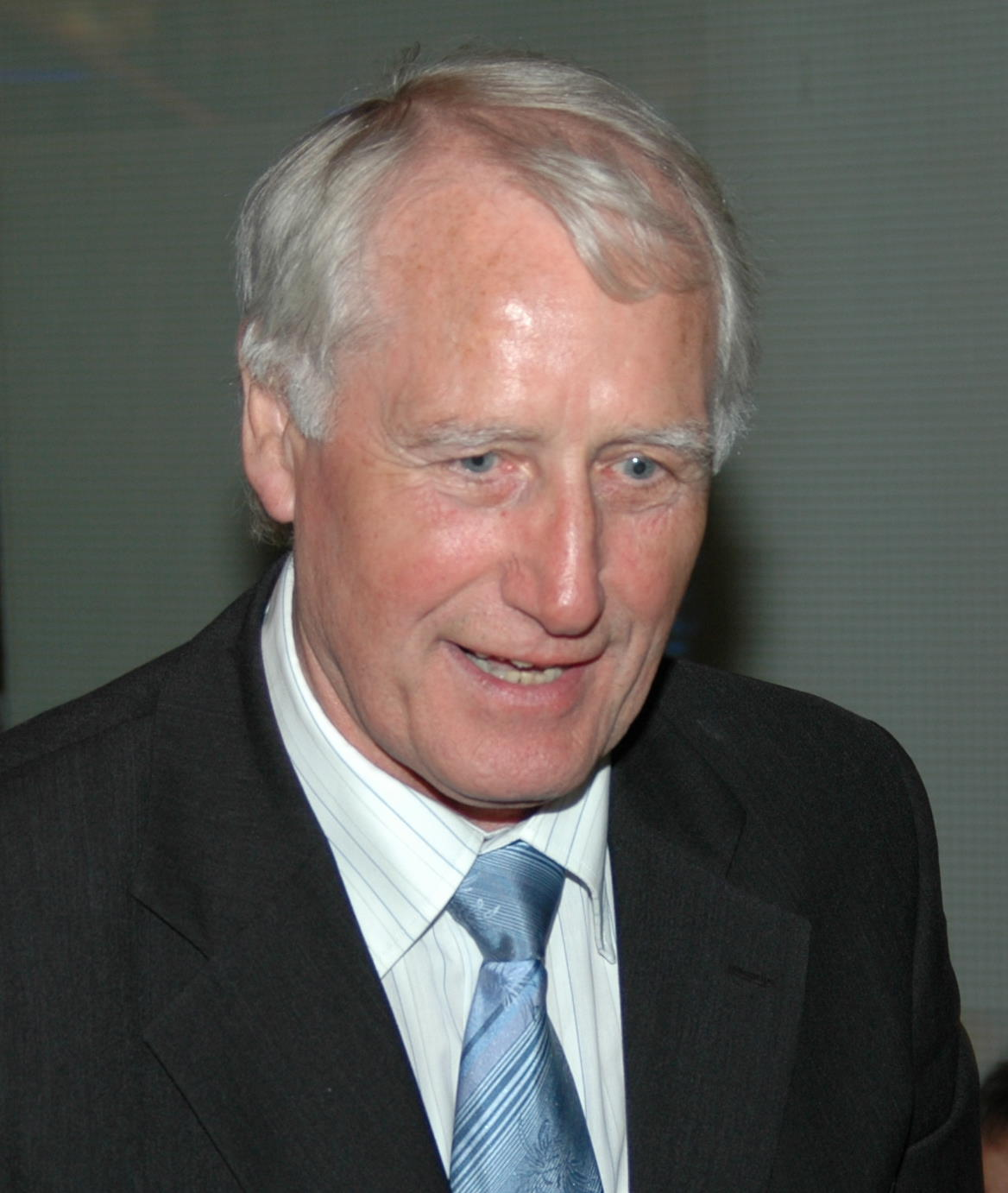
- Tilkowski in 2005

Personal information
- Date of birth: 12 July 1935
- Place of birth: Husen, Dortmund, Germany
- Date of death: 5 January 2020 (aged 84)
- Height: 1.82 m (6 ft 0 in)
- Position: Goalkeeper

Senior career*
| Years | Team | Apps | (Gls) |
| 1955–1962 | Westfalia Herne | 219 | (0) |
| 1963–1967 | Borussia Dortmund | 81 | (0) |
| 1967–1970 | Eintracht Frankfurt | 40 | (0) |
| Total | | 340 | (0) |

International career
| 1957–1967 | West Germany | 39 | (0) |

Managerial career
- 1970: Werder Bremen
- 1970–1972: 1860 Munich
- 1973–1976: 1. FC Nürnberg
- 1976–1977: Werder Bremen
- 1978: 1. FC Saarbrücken
- 1981–1982: AEK Athens
Medal record
Men's football
Representing West Germany
FIFA World Cup
| Runner-up | 1966 England |
- * Club domestic league appearances and goals

Hans Tilkowski (12 July 1935 – 5 January 2020) was a German football player and manager. A goalkeeper, he played for West Germany, and was a member of the team that lost the 1966 World Cup final to England.

== Career ==
Born 1935 in Husen, Dortmund, Tilkowski started football at age 11 with SV Husen 19, originally as a right winger. He switched to the goalkeeper position and joined SuS Kaiserau in 1949. He started his professional career with the team in 1952, then joined Westfalia Herne in 1955. With Herne, he won the Oberliga West in 1959. His next team was Borussia Dortmund. From 1963 to 1967 he played 81 times in the West German Bundesliga for Dortmund. Tilkowski won the DFB-Pokal with Dortmund in 1965 and the 1965–66 European Cup Winners' Cup. He was chosen German Footballer of the Year in 1965. Tilkowski was regarded as one of the world's best goalkeepers during the mid-1960s.

Tilkowski debuted for the West Germany national team in 1957. He was expected to be the first-choice keeper for the 1962 FIFA World Cup in Chile, but was demoted by coach Sepp Herberger the day before the opening match. Tilkowski destroyed his hotel room in anger and did not play for the national team for two years, but was eventually called up again. Under Herberger's successor Helmut Schön, Tilkowski was the first-choice in goal for the 1966 FIFA World Cup in England. The team would lose the final 4–2 to the hosts. The final was remembered as English forward Geoff Hurst scored his controversial second goal en route to a hat-trick. In the 101st minute, 11 minutes into the extra time, Hurst's shot hit the crossbar, the ball then bounced on the ground before being cleared by defender Wolfgang Weber. The goal was given by referee Gottfried Dienst after consultation with linesman Tofiq Bahramov, giving England a 3–2 lead. Photographic evidence would later show that the ball did not cross the line. Unlike most of his team-mates, Tilkowski never resigned himself to the decision, pointing out whenever he could that it was flawed – though with a sense of humour. In 2009 he agreed to unveil a statue in Azerbaijan of Tofiq Bahramov, the linesman who had indicated that the goal should stand. He played for West Germany another year, before being superseded in the national team by Sepp Maier.

Tilkowski ended his playing career with Eintracht Frankfurt.

He later took up coaching, taking charge of 1. FC Nürnberg, Werder Bremen and AEK Athens, among other clubs.

== Personal life ==
One of three children, Tilkowski was born in Dortmund on 12 July 1935. His father, a miner, was descended from the many workers who had left Poland to seek work in the industries of the Ruhr.

Tilkowski grew up in straitened circumstances. He enjoyed boxing as a boy, and he initially played football as a winger before finding his calling when his team lacked a goalkeeper. He became an apprentice locksmith, then joined Westfalia Herne in 1955.

In June 1959, he married Luise; they had two sons and one daughter.

Tilkowski died on 5 January 2020 at age 84 after a long illness.

== Honours ==
Borussia Dortmund

- DFB-Pokal: 1964–65
- European Cup Winners' Cup: 1965–66
- Bundesliga runner-up: 1965–66

West Germany

- FIFA World Cup runner-up: 1966

Individual

- Footballer of the Year (Germany): 1965
