= Ghost goal =

Goal wrongly awarded or not given in association football

In association football, a ghost goal (or phantom goal) is either a goal wrongly awarded despite the ball not having crossed the goal line, or a goal wrongly not given despite the ball having crossed the line. In an attempt to combat ghost goals, rules allowing goal-line technology (GLT) were passed by the International Football Association Board in 2012 and have consequently been introduced for some football competitions, including the FIFA World Cup, FIFA Club World Cup and Premier League. The video assistant referee (VAR), introduced in 2018, provides an alternative system to GLT, and is cheaper to introduce and operate than the FIFA qualified GLT systems.

== Etymology ==
In Germany, the term "Phantomtor" usually refers to a Bundesliga "goal" awarded to Bayern Munich player Thomas Helmer in April 1994 against 1. FC Nürnberg, as his team scraped to a 2–1 victory. It was an error of judgement by the match officials, as the ball missed the goal and instead went over the byline. The "goal" had direct implications on the outcome of the competition at both ends of the table — had the Phantomtor not stood and the match finished 1–1, Bayern Munich would have ultimately lost out on the league title on goal difference and Nürnberg would have survived relegation by one point — and led to an official objection by FIFA because the German Football Association ordered the result to be annulled and the game to be replayed. A re-match eventually took place and Bayern Munich ran out 5–0 winners.

The term "ghost goal" in the English language arose from a quote by Chelsea manager José Mourinho, following a 2005 Champions League semi-final second leg against Liverpool, ultimately decided by a single goal by Luis García, awarded by referee Ľuboš Micheľ, but dubbed a "ghost goal" and described as "a goal that came from the moon" by Mourinho. Television replays were inconclusive as to whether the ball crossed the line or not. Micheľ said that his decision was based on the reaction of the assistant referee, who signalled that the ball had indeed crossed over the line, but had he not awarded Liverpool the goal, he would have awarded them a penalty kick and sent off Chelsea goalkeeper Petr Čech for a foul on Milan Baroš instead. After studying a series of still images of the incident, motion expert Dr. Mike Spann concluded that Micheľ had made the correct decision by signalling a goal.

After the 2005 incident, the terms "ghost goal" and "phantom goal" have both been used to describe similar incidents at both club and international level.

== Incidents at club level ==
=== Crystal Palace v Coventry City, 1980–81 League Division One ===
In 1980, Clive Allen shot a free kick for Crystal Palace against Coventry City, after which the ball rebounded off the stanchion but the referee disallowed the goal as he thought it had just hit the outside of the stanchion. This was shown on Match of the Day on BBC television when it was then transmitted on Sunday afternoons.

=== Partick Thistle v Dundee United, 1992–93 Scottish Premier Division ===
In a 1993 Scottish Premier Division match between Partick Thistle and Dundee United at Firhill, the ball entered the goal and bounced back from the supporting stanchion after a close-range shot by Paddy Connolly. Despite Partick defender Martin Clark catching the ball and handing it to goalkeeper Andy Murdoch, referee Les Mottram failed to award the goal or penalise the handball and waved play on. Dundee United still won 4–0, and Mottram went on to officiate in the 1994 FIFA World Cup. The incident resulted in the stanchions, previously widely used, being removed in a re-design of football goalposts. In 2018, at the same end of the same stadium, a similar incident occurred, with Partick Thistle this time being denied a legitimate goal due to the ball taking a deceptive bounce off the bottom of the net frame.

=== Tottenham Hotspur v Manchester United, 2004–05 Premier League ===
A few months before the 2004–05 UEFA Champions League semi-final between Chelsea and Liverpool which led to the term "ghost goal" entering the lexicon, Pedro Mendes of Tottenham Hotspur caught Manchester United's goalkeeper Roy Carroll off his line with a shot from 55 yards out, in the 89th minute of a Premier League match on 4 January 2005. Carroll attempted to catch the ball but spilled it over his shoulder and a few yards over the goal line, before he scooped the ball back into the playing area. Referee Mark Clattenburg and his officials were unable to determine whether the ball had crossed the line and the game finished goalless.

=== Reading v Watford, 2008–09 EFL Championship ===
Referee Stuart Attwell awarded a goal to Reading against Watford in an English Championship match in September 2008, although the ball had passed wide of the goal, so that his assistant should have awarded a corner kick; the match finished 2–2. A similar incident happened in a 2. Bundesliga match between MSV Duisburg and FSV Frankfurt, when Christian Tiffert took a shot that hit the crossbar and landed 1.5 metres outside of the goal-line, yet was still awarded as a goal.

=== Crystal Palace v Bristol City, 2009–10 EFL Championship ===
Conversely, during an English Championship game in August 2009, Crystal Palace's Freddie Sears put the ball in the net, hitting the stanchion at the back of the goal and bouncing out. A goal was not awarded. This was very similar to the incident that had occurred for Crystal Palace's Clive Allen almost 30 years earlier.

=== Bolton Wanderers v Queens Park Rangers, 2011–12 Premier League ===
Another incident in England came in a Premier League game between Bolton Wanderers and Queens Park Rangers on 10 March 2012, when QPR's Clint Hill headed the ball in from close range. The ball crossed the line by a couple of feet before goalkeeper Ádám Bogdán was able to palm it onto the crossbar and out. The Football Association (FA) subsequently called for goal-line technology to be implemented as soon as possible. The corner which led to the goal had in fact been wrongly awarded, and should have been a Bolton goal kick, meaning two bad decisions "evened themselves out".

=== AC Milan v Juventus, 2011–12 Serie A ===
On 25 February 2012, with A.C. Milan leading 1–0 against Juventus, Sulley Muntari appeared to have doubled Milan's lead with a header from a cross by Urby Emanuelson, but the goal was not given by referee Paolo Tagliavento even though the ball had crossed the line before being saved by Gianluigi Buffon; the match ended 1–1. Juventus eventually went on to win the Serie A title that year undefeated, beating Milan to the Scudetto by four points.

=== Chelsea v Tottenham Hotspur, 2011–12 FA Cup ===
On 15 April 2012, in Chelsea's FA Cup semi-final against Tottenham Hotspur, referee Martin Atkinson awarded Chelsea a goal resulting from a 49th-minute shot by Juan Mata. Atkinson ruled the shot had crossed the line, although replays confirmed that several Tottenham players had successfully blocked the effort several yards in front of the goal-line. John Terry, the Chelsea player with the clearest view of the "goal" from his vantage point on the ground, admitted uncertainty: "I thought it hit me, if I'm honest. I don't think it did [cross the line], I thought it stayed out, but I've not seen it on the replay."

=== Bayer Leverkusen v 1899 Hoffenheim, 2013–14 Bundesliga ===
On 18 October 2013, Stefan Kiessling of Bayer Leverkusen was involved in a ghost-goal situation against 1899 Hoffenheim. He appeared to have missed the net on a header attempt off a corner. He turned away in frustration only to have his teammates come and celebrate with him seconds later. Upon further review, the ball had ended up in the back of the net after squeezing through a hole in the side netting, unnoticed by everybody at the time. The goal was allowed and was the cause of much debate after the match.

=== Wrexham v Kidderminster Harriers, 2013–14 Conference Premier ===
On 16 November 2013, Adrian Cieślewicz of Wrexham was involved in a situation of this kind. With Wrexham down 2–0 at Kidderminster Harriers in a Conference Premier game, Cieslewicz burst into the penalty area and appeared to slot the ball into the bottom corner of the net. However, the ball had actually squeezed through a hole in the net, and referee Amy Fearn originally disallowed the goal. After six minutes of consultation, with her assistants amidst protests from the Wrexham players, the goal was awarded. However, Kidderminster took advantage of the delay in the match and scored to make it 3–1.

=== Flamengo v Vasco da Gama, 2014 Campeonato Carioca ===
On 16 February 2014, a match between CR Flamengo and CR Vasco da Gama was marked by controversy in Brazil. Vasco player Douglas took a free kick which hit the crossbar and entered the goal by 33 centimeters. The goal, however, was not given. At the same match, Flamengo's Elano took a free kick, which Martín Silva saved inside the goal, which also entered by centimeters. This goal, however, was given. Flamengo would go on to win the match 2–1.

=== Kasımpaşa v Galatasaray, 2015–16 Süper Lig ===
On 28 November 2015, Ryan Donk of Kasımpaşa was involved in a situation against Galatasaray. With Kasımpaşa 1–0 down at Galatasaray in a Süper Lig match, Donk kicked the ball. It hit the crossbar and then fell to 9 cm inside the goal line. However, referee Halis Özkahya looked at the linesman and disallowed the goal and continued the match, which finished 2–2.

=== Barcelona v Valencia, 2017–18 La Liga ===
On 26 November 2017, Lionel Messi of FC Barcelona kicked the ball towards Valencia CF goalkeeper Neto, but it passed by him and entered the goal by several inches. The referee did not see, and the goal was not awarded. The game ended 1–1.

=== Sheffield United v Aston Villa, 2019–20 Premier League ===
On 17 June 2020, the first day the 2019–20 Premier League resumed after its postponement from the COVID-19 pandemic, a free kick by Sheffield United's Oliver Norwood was carried over the goal line by Aston Villa goalkeeper Ørjan Nyland, after a collision with his teammate Keinan Davis. Although goal-line technology and video assistant referee (VAR) were in place, neither the systems nor the match officials signalled a goal. Hawk-Eye, operators of the goal-line technology, issued an apology after the game, stating that the view of the cameras was occluded by the players and the goal frame. The referees' representative body Professional Game Match Officials Limited stated that VAR did not intervene because no goal had been signalled to the match officials.

=== Real Madrid v Barcelona, 2023–24 La Liga ===
On 21 April 2024, Real Madrid defeated FC Barcelona 3–2 in an El Clásico match marked by a controversial Lamine Yamal backheel that Andriy Lunin saved inside the goal, which appeared to have entered the goal. Barcelona requested a replay of the match, which was formally denied.

== Incidents at international level ==
=== Ireland v Scotland in the British Home Championship 1892 ===
An early ghost goal decided a British Home Championship match between Ireland and Scotland in 1892. Goal nets were in use, precisely to aid the judgement of when a goal had been scored, but were still an experimental innovation, and confusion was caused when a Scotland shot went wide of the post, but the ball came to rest against the net and an Irish defender brought it inside the goal area to restart play. The referee, who had a poor view of the shot itself, assumed a goal had been scored and duly awarded what turned out to be the winner in a 3–2 result. The referee required protection from the angry supporters at full time.

=== 1966 FIFA World Cup Final ===
In the 1966 FIFA World Cup final played in London's original Wembley Stadium between England and West Germany, 11 minutes of extra-time had elapsed and the score was level at 2–2. Alan Ball put in a cross to England striker Geoff Hurst, who swivelled and shot from close range. The ball hit the underside of the crossbar bouncing down towards the line and bounced off the ground before being cleared away by West Germany's defenders.

The England players celebrated a goal, but referee Gottfried Dienst was uncertain if they had indeed scored. He consulted his assistant, Tofiq Bahramov; after a brief conversation in broken English, the Swiss referee awarded the goal to the home team. The crowd and the audience of 400 million television viewers were left unsure whether the ball had crossed the line and whether the goal should have been given or not. England went on to win the match 4–2 and secure their first FIFA World Cup and only trophy so far.

Goals in association football are awarded when "the whole of the ball passes over the goal line". German players claimed to have seen chalk dust, which would indicate it was not a goal and that the ball had merely bounced on the goal-line. Those who consider that the linesman made the correct decision cite the good position of the linesman and the statement of Roger Hunt, the nearest England player to the ball, who claimed he saw the ball bounce over the line, and therefore wheeled away in celebration rather than attempting to tap the rebounding ball in.

When Bahramov wrote his memoirs, he stated that he believed the ball had bounced back, not from the crossbar, but from the net, so the further movement of the ball was already insignificant, and not visible for him either so it did not matter where the ball hit the ground anyway. Referee Dienst did not see the scene. Commentators such as Robert Becker of Kicker magazine accused the assistant of bias because the German team had eliminated the Soviets in the semi-final.

In England, Bahramov became known as "the Russian linesman", as Azerbaijan was part of the Soviet Union at the time. Bahramov also became famous in his home land: Azerbaijan's national football stadium was named after him and a statue was built. When England played the Azerbaijan national team in a FIFA World Cup qualifier in October 2004—in the stadium named after Bahramov—many England fans travelling to the game asked to be shown the grave of the official, who had died in 1993, so that they could place flowers on it, and before the match a ceremony honouring him was attended by Hurst and other footballing celebrities. In Germany, it led to the creation of the expression Wembley-Tor ("Wembley goal"), a phrase used to describe any shot that hits the crossbar, bounces on the ground and spins back into the penalty area.

A study conducted by the engineering department at Oxford University concluded the ball did not cross the line entirely and that it was at least 6 cm (2.4 in) away from being a goal. On Sky Sports in 2016, the Monday Night Football team used statistical data from Opta, plus the Sky Pad touchscreen and virtual reality from EA Sports, to re-examine England's third goal in the 1966 FIFA World Cup final. After conducting an analysis, the duo concluded that the entire ball had crossed the goal line, meaning this goal is legitimate. Jamie Carragher said, "It has gone down in history – was it over the line, was it not? Thankfully, today we can put that all to bed."

There exists colour footage of Hurst's goal, taken from another angle by an amateur cameraman situated in the stands and having a view almost parallel to the English goal line. This film material appears to show that the ball did not cross the goal-line in full.

=== Brazil v Spain at the 1986 FIFA World Cup ===
On 1 June 1986, at the 52nd minute of the opening match of Group D of the 1986 FIFA World Cup, following a corner kick play repelled from the Brazilian penalty box, Míchel took control of the ball and shot from just outside the box. The ball hit the crossbar, bounced 20 cm (7.8 inches) past the goal line and back out. Referee Chris Bambridge did not award the goal, despite protests from the Spanish players. Spain went on to lose the match 1–0.

=== Bulgaria v Romania at Euro 1996 ===
On 13 June 1996, during the group stage match between Bulgaria and Romania, the ball of Dorinel Munteanu crossed the goal line by about one foot, after which it bounced back. Referee Peter Mikkelsen did not notice and did not award the goal. As a consequence, Romania lost the match 1–0.

=== England v Germany at the 2010 FIFA World Cup ===
On 27 June 2010, England were playing Germany in the knockout round of the 2010 FIFA World Cup in Bloemfontein. In the 38th minute, 53 seconds after Matthew Upson had scored for England, Frank Lampard shot the ball and it hit the underside of the crossbar, resulting in it crossing the line into the goal but bouncing back into the field of play due to backspin (without hitting the net). Neither referee Jorge Larrionda nor his assistant were in a position to award the goal. Had the goal been given, England would have drawn level at 2–2. Germany, where this goal was given names like "Wembley goal reloaded", "inverted Wembley goal" or "revenge for Wembley", went on to win the game 4–1.

=== England v Ukraine at Euro 2012 ===
On 19 June 2012, on the final match day of the group stage of UEFA Euro 2012, the match between England and Ukraine featured a ghost goal by Ukraine's Marko Dević; with co-hosts Ukraine trailing 1–0, Dević's shot was hooked clear from behind the England goal-line by John Terry under the eyes of a fifth official standing beside the goal. However, Dević's teammate Artem Milevskyi was offside in the build-up to the incident, which also went unnoticed by the match officials. Despite that, the incident caused significant embarrassment for UEFA and its president Michel Platini, who had argued several days prior that the goal-line official system that was introduced at the tournament would obviate any need for a technological solution. The following day, UEFA and its chief refereeing officer Pierluigi Collina admitted an error had been made and that Ukraine had been denied a legitimate goal, and FIFA president Sepp Blatter called the use of goal-line technology "a necessity".

=== Panama v Costa Rica in 2018 FIFA World Cup qualifier ===
On 10 October 2017, Panama hosted Costa Rica in the final round of 2018 FIFA World Cup qualification. Johan Venegas opened the scoring for Costa Rica, before Gabriel Torres headed the ball against the goal line. The ball did not cross the line, but referee Walter López awarded a goal for Panama to level the match. In the 88th minute, Román Torres scored for Panama to win the match, eliminating the United States and condemning Honduras to the CONCACAF-AFC play-off against Australia. If Gabriel Torres' goal was not given, Panama would have failed to qualify for the tournament, with Honduras automatically qualifying and the United States advancing to the intercontinental play-off. American press outlets speculated that U.S. Soccer would appeal against Panama's ghost goal to the Court of Arbitration for Sport. However, Michael Kammarman, the federation's press officer, stated "As far as I know there is no recourse. Decisions of the referee are final". The controversy renewed calls for goal-line technology to be used in all FIFA World Cup qualifying matches rather than only the tournament itself.

Panama would go on to finish in last place the following year in Russia.

=== Serbia v Portugal in 2022 FIFA World Cup qualifier ===
On 27 March 2021, Portugal were playing Serbia in a FIFA World Cup qualifying match at the Rajko Mitic Stadium. After 90 minutes and with the score tied at 2–2, Portugal's Cristiano Ronaldo scored what appeared to be a winning goal in stoppage time; the ball rolled into the post and crossed the line just before being kicked away by Serbia captain Dušan Tadić. Despite replays clearly showing the ball completely crossing the line, there was no goal-line technology or video assistant referee present in the match, and the referee did not award a goal, which infuriated Ronaldo and prompted him to take off his captain's armband in anger. The match finished 2–2 and Serbia would eventually go on to finish top of Group A and qualify directly for the tournament by beating the same Portuguese team in Lisbon, whilst Portugal had to go through the March 2022 play-offs in order to seal their ticket to Qatar.

=== Italy vs France in the 2023 Under-21 UEFA European Championship ===
In the 2023 UEFA European Under-21 Championship, Italy were playing France in the first game of the group. In the 92nd minute, with France leading 2–1, Italy's Raoul Bellanova scored a header, which was blocked by a French defender clearly over the line. However, due to the absence of Goal Line Technology, the goal was not awarded. Considering the results of subsequent matches, if the goal had been awarded (making the result 2–2), France would have won the group regardless, while Italy would have advanced to the knockout stage as runners-up, instead of finishing third and therefore knocked out.

=== Qatar vs India in 2026 FIFA World Cup qualifier ===
In the second round of 2026 FIFA World Cup qualification for Asian teams, Qatar took on India in the Jassim bin Hamad Stadium, in the final game of Group A in June 2024. India required a win to qualify for the third round of World Cup qualification for the first time in the nation's history. India were leading 1–0 until the 73rd minute, when a header was saved by Gurpreet Singh Sandhu, the ball hit a Qatari attacker, and rolled out of play for what should have been a goal kick. However, the ball was pulled back into play and Yousef Aymen put the ball in the net. The referee awarded the goal, and due to the absence of VAR, it could not be overturned either. Footage gathered from various angles from several cameras in the stadium saw the ball clearly cross the line for a goal kick. This made the game 1–1, and Qatar went on to score again in the 85th minute to win the match 2–1. This eliminated India from World Cup qualifying, as they needed a win to qualify for the next round.

== See also ==
- Scoring in association football
