= Stuart Attwell =

English football referee (born 1982)

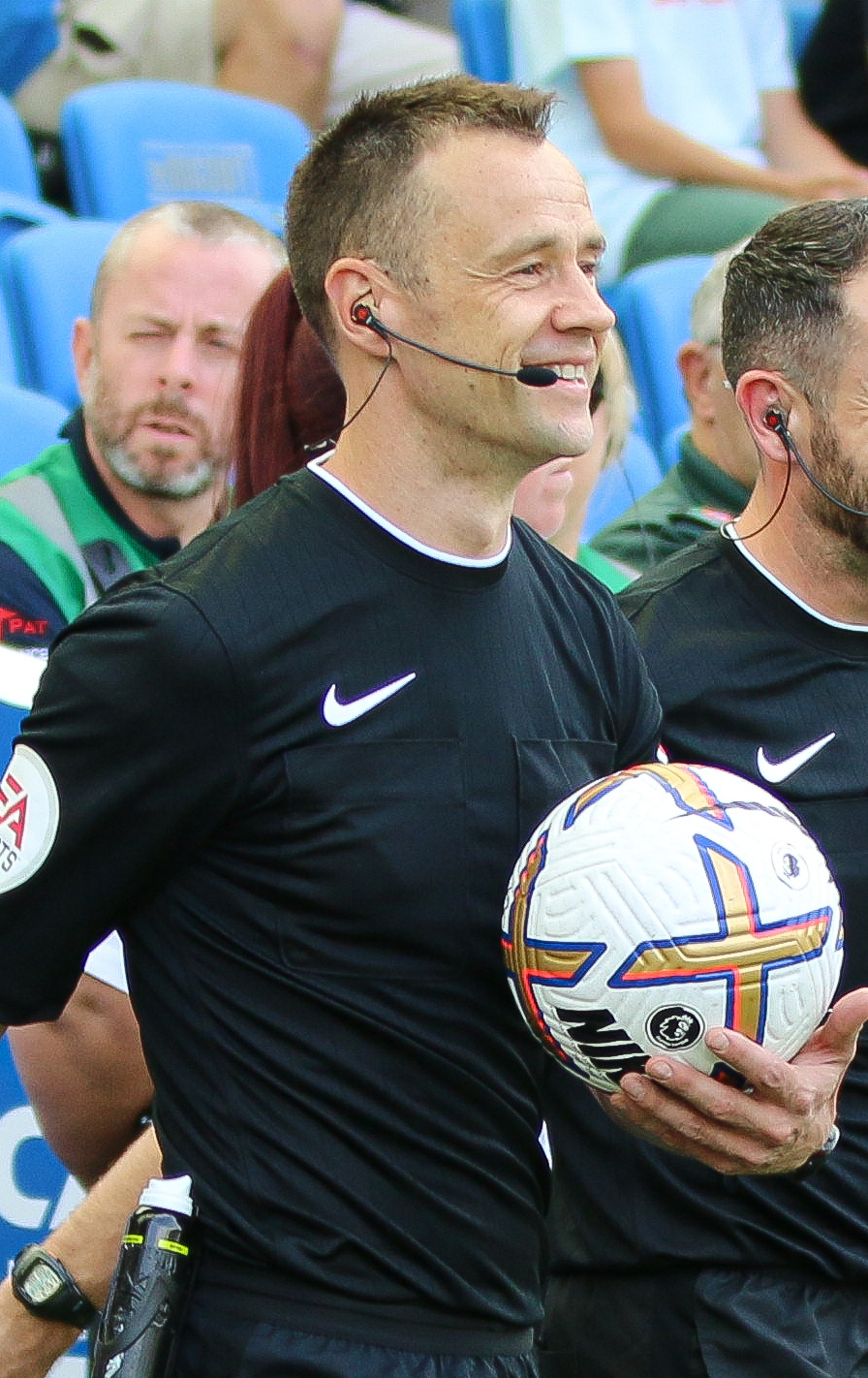
- Attwell in 2022
- Full name: Stuart Steven Attwell
- Born: 6 October 1982 (age 44); Nuneaton, Warwickshire, England

Domestic
Years	League	Role
2007–2016	The Football League	Referee
2008–2012; 2016–	Premier League	Referee

International
Years	League	
2009–	Referee	

Stuart Steven Attwell (born 6 October 1982) is an English referee from Nuneaton, Warwickshire, who currently officiates in the Premier League.

Attwell made a prominent debut in 2008 as the youngest person ever to referee in the Premier League. but was demoted from the Select Group in February 2012, returning to refereeing in the Football League. He returned to the Select Group in March 2016.

== Career ==
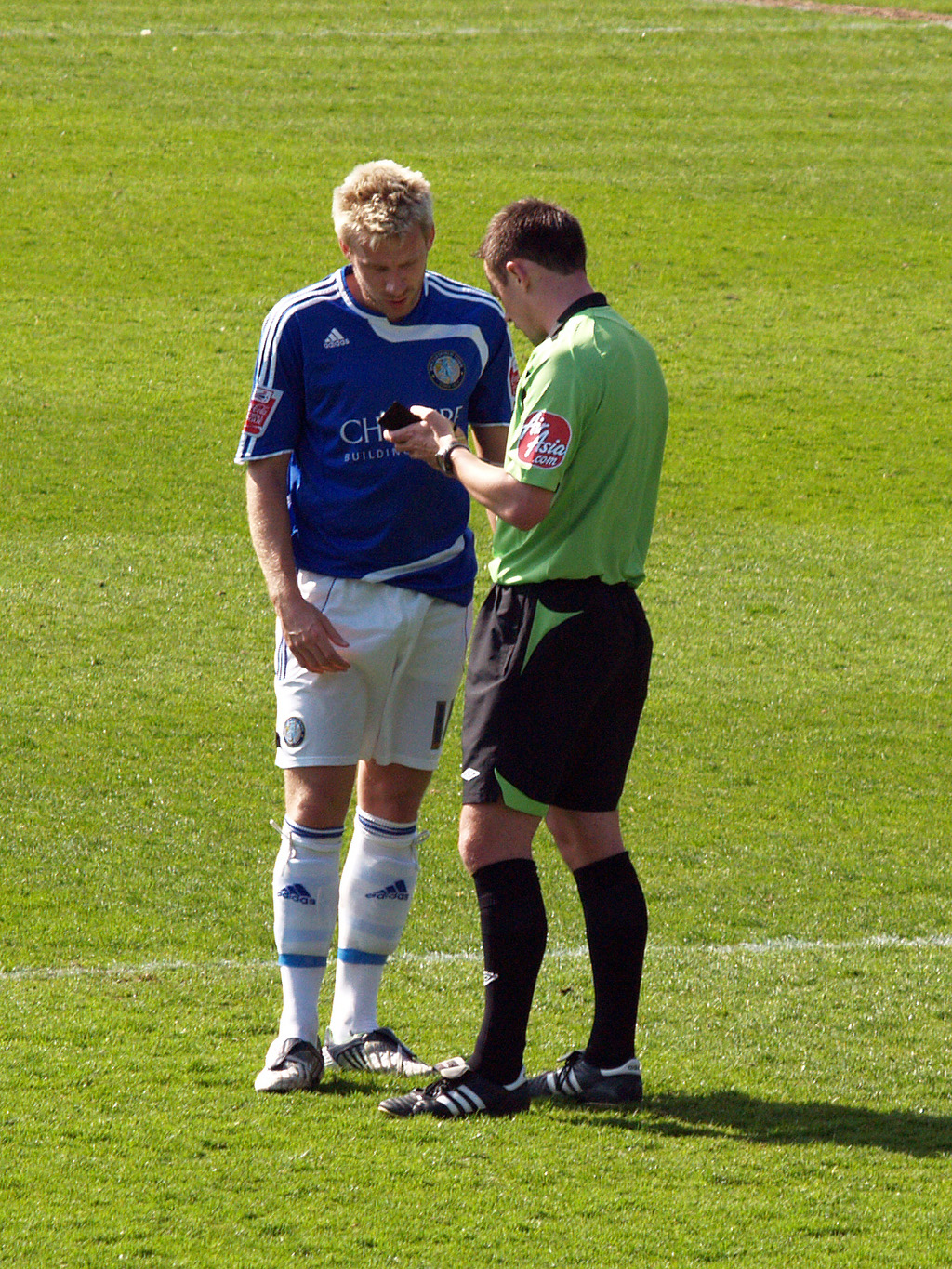
Attwell (right) with Jamie Tolley in 2009

In 1982 he was born in Nuneaton, Warwickshire and grew up there. Attwell graduated from Staffordshire University in 2004. Refereeing had been a lifelong ambition for him, according to his father. Attwell worked his way up from local games to non-League football, then to the West Midlands League and the Football League.

His promotion to Football League refereeing came ahead of the 2007–08 season, officiating his first match on 11 August 2007 in a League Two fixture between Hereford United and Rotherham United. He first officiated in League One when taking charge of a game between Swansea City and Gillingham. Attwell continued to be promoted, and on 26 December 2007, he made his Championship debut officiating a 1–1 draw between Sheffield United and Blackpool. In total he refereed five Championship games during the 2007–08 season. On 26 May 2008 Attwell officiated the League Two play-off final between Rochdale and Stockport County at Wembley Stadium, won 3–2 by Stockport.

Attwell was included in the Select Group of referees for the 2008–09 season, making him eligible to referee in the Premier League, and granting him full-time employment by the Professional Game Match Officials Association. On 25 June 2008, he was promoted to the list of top flight officials in the Premier League, after just one season in the Football League. This made him the youngest ever Premier League referee at 25 years of age. On 23 August 2008, he made his Premier League debut when he refereed a 1–1 draw between Blackburn Rovers and Hull City.

On 20 December 2008, Attwell was added to the international list of referees for 2009. Even before that he made an international debut in UEFA Champions League group stage as the 4th official, helping his countryman Atkinson in Minsk, Belarus, during Bate Borisov match against Juventus on the 30th of September 2008.

In July 2010, Attwell officiated in Japanese J.League matches for three weeks. Attwell and Anthony Taylor were sent to Japan as part of referee exchange programmes signed between the English FA and Japanese FA.

In February 2012, Attwell was demoted from the list of Select Group Referees and returned to Football League duty on the National List. The move was said to come by mutual consent. Professional Game Match Officials Limited general manager Mike Riley backed Attwell to improve as a referee and return to the top level.

Attwell returned to officiating in the Premier League in October 2014. He was promoted to the list of Select Group Referees in March 2016.

Stuart Attwell has been involved in a number of controversial refereeing decisions that have drawn criticism from clubs, players, and media commentators.

During a match between Manchester United and AFC Bournemouth, Attwell faced criticism after not awarding a penalty to Manchester United following a challenge on Amad Diallo, where he appeared to be pulled down. In the same match, a separate incident involving Harry Maguire resulted in a red card after a comparatively softer challenge, prompting discussion regarding the consistency of decision-making.

In a fixture between Manchester United and Burnley F.C., a goal scored by Lisandro Martínez was ruled out despite appearing legitimate. The decision was later acknowledged as an error by the Professional Game Match Officials Limited.

In a 2023 match between Arsenal F.C. and Liverpool F.C., a potential handball by Martin Ødegaard in the penalty area was not penalised, leading to widespread debate among analysts and supporters.

During a match between Sunderland A.F.C. and Leeds United F.C., Leeds United were denied a penalty in what was described by some observers as a clear and obvious incident, generating post-match discussion.

In a fixture between Everton F.C. and Nottingham Forest F.C., multiple penalty appeals by Nottingham Forest were not awarded. The club subsequently issued formal complaints regarding the officiating.

Earlier in his career, Attwell and one of his assistants, Nigel Bannister, were censured for a decision to award a "ghost goal" to Reading in a Championship game at Watford on 20 September 2008 after Bannister mistakenly flagged for a goal instead of a corner kick. The incident led to both Attwell and Bannister being dropped from their duties the following weekend. Six weeks later, Attwell refereed a 1–1 draw between Derby County and Nottingham Forest.

In a match between Manchester City F.C. and Liverpool F.C., a challenge by Jérémy Doku on Alexis Mac Allister was not penalised, despite being described by some commentators as dangerous.

During a fixture between Fulham F.C. and Wolverhampton Wanderers F.C., an incident involving alleged violent conduct went unpunished, leading to criticism following the match.

In April 2023, during a match between Tottenham Hotspur F.C. and Brighton & Hove Albion F.C., a penalty was not awarded to Brighton in a widely discussed incident. The Professional Game Match Officials Limited later issued an apology.

In a January 2022 fixture between Arsenal F.C. and Manchester City F.C., comparisons were drawn between similar incidents that resulted in differing penalty decisions, raising questions about consistency.

In an August 2022 match between Chelsea F.C. and Tottenham Hotspur F.C., a failure to act on an incident of misconduct in the build-up to a goal led to further criticism of officiating standards.

Media reports have also noted instances of supporter backlash following controversial decisions. An online petition hosted on Change.org calling for an investigation into Attwell's officiating had attracted over 450 signatures as of March 2026, with many noting that Stuart Attwell has substantially higher patterns of controversial and widely criticised decisions that does not align with football "principles of fairness, consistency, and accountability."

Attwell was chosen to referee the 2025 FA Cup final between Crystal Palace and Manchester City.

== Career statistics ==
=== England ===
Season	Games	Total (yellow card)	(yellow card) per game	Total (red card)	(red card) per game
2007–08	32	52	1.62	9	0.28
2008–09	30	94	3.13	8	0.26
2009–10	26	95	3.65	4	0.15
2010–11	25	79	3.16	2	0.08
2011–12	32	102	3.19	6	0.19
2012–13	44	129	2.93	3	0.07
2013–14	36	108	3.00	9	0.25
2014–15	37	95	2.57	4	0.11
2015–16	44	118	2.68	4	0.09
2016–17	27	90	3.33	8	0.30
2017–18	29	99	3.41	3	0.10
2018–19	30	99	3.30	4	0.13
2019–20	27	125	4.63	5	0.19
2020–21	28	107	3.82	4	0.14
2021–22	28	99	3.56	1	0.04
2022–23	29	104	3.59	3	0.10
2023–24	25	100	4.00	5	0.20

Statistics for all competitions, including domestic, European and international. No records available prior to 2007–08.

=== Japan ===
Season	Games	Total (yellow card)	(yellow card) per game	Total (red card)	(red card) per game
2010	2	18	9.00	0	0.00
