= 1966 FIFA World Cup final =

World Cup final, held in England

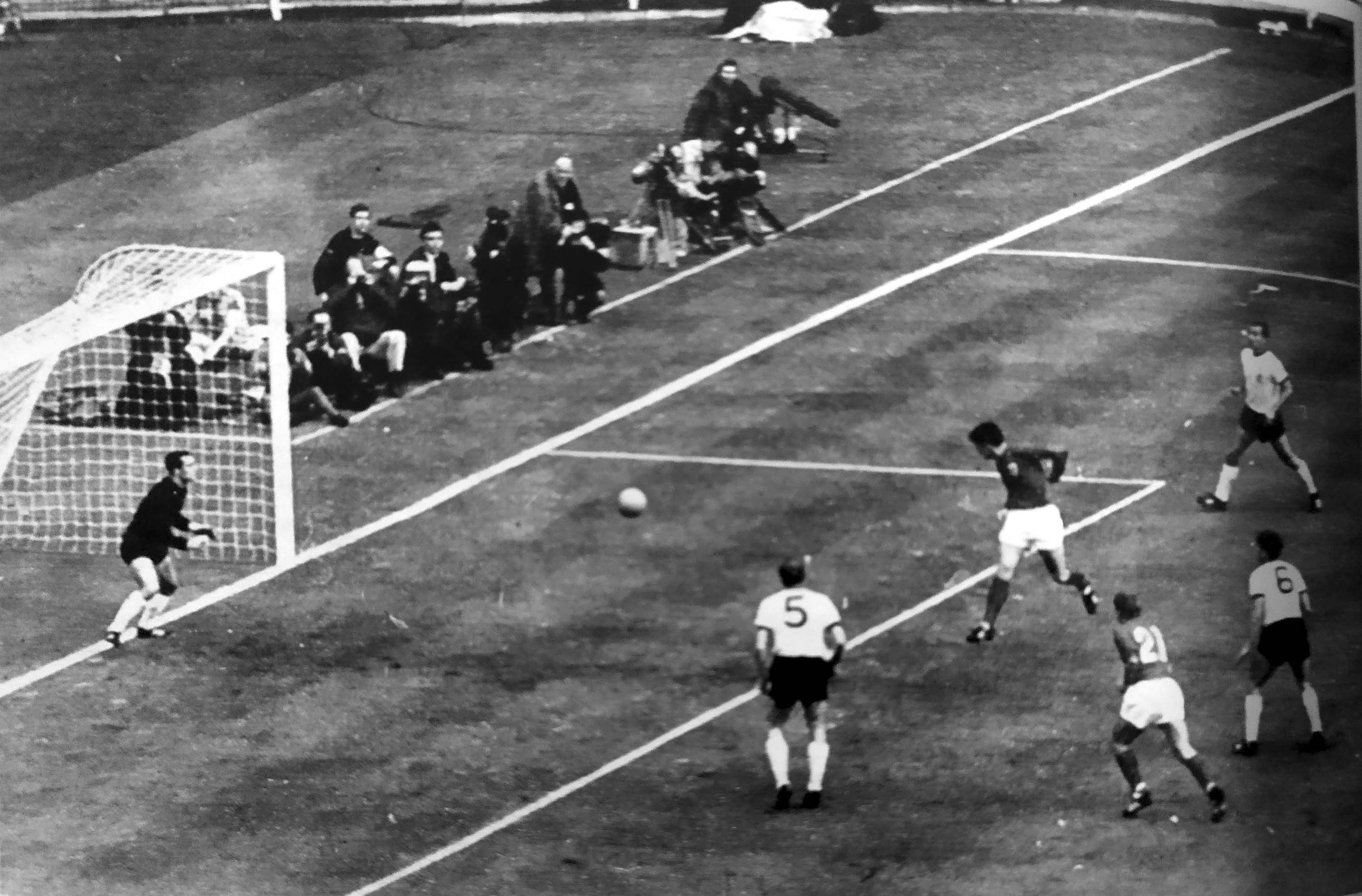
- Geoff Hurst scoring a header against West Germany
England	West Germany
4	2
- After extra time
- Date: 30 July 1966
- Venue: Wembley Stadium, London
- Referee: Gottfried Dienst (Switzerland)
- Attendance: 96,924
- Weather: 20 °C (68 °F)

The 1966 FIFA World Cup final was a football match played at Wembley Stadium in London on Saturday 30 July 1966 to determine the winner of the 1966 FIFA World Cup, the eighth FIFA World Cup. The match was contested by England and West Germany, with England winning 4–2 after extra time to claim the Jules Rimet Trophy. It was the only time that England hosted or won the World Cup, and also the only World Cup final that happened on a Saturday.

West Germany took the lead in the 11th minute when Helmut Haller shot the ball into the bottom left corner when an English defender failed to clear the ball, before Geoff Hurst equalised with a header to make it 1–1, assisting a teammate who took a free kick. The score remained level by halftime until England took the lead with a 78th minute goal from Martin Peters (who was the only player to be booked during the match). England almost won by full time before West German player, Wolfgang Weber, scored a 2–2 equaliser in the 90th minute. The game went into extra time, in which Geoff Hurst scored a controversial goal in the 101st minute to make the score 3–2 after the first 15 minutes of extra time, until Hurst scored again in the final minute to complete his hat-trick, ending the game 4–2 after the extra 30 minutes. He was the only man to score a hat-trick in a World Cup final until Kylian Mbappé did so in 2022.

The match is remembered for England's only World Cup and first and only major international title, Hurst's hat-trick – the first scored in a FIFA World Cup final – and the dubious third goal awarded to England by referee Gottfried Dienst and linesman Tofiq Bahramov. The England team became known as the "wingless wonders", on account of their then-unconventional narrow attacking formation, described at the time as a 4–4–2.

In addition to an attendance of 96,924 at the stadium, the British television audience peaked at 32.3 million viewers, making it the United Kingdom's most-watched television event ever.

== Road to the final ==
Both teams were strong throughout the tournament. Each won two and drew one of their three matches in the group stages. England did not concede a goal until their semi-final against Portugal.

England
Round
West Germany
Opponent
Result
Group stage
Opponent
Result
Uruguay
0–0
Match 1
Switzerland
5–0
Mexico
2–0
Match 2
Argentina
0–0
France
2–0
Match 3
Spain
2–1
Group 1 winner

Team	Pld	W	D	L	GF	GA	GD	Pts
England	3	2	1	0	4	0	+4	5
Uruguay	3	1	2	0	2	1	+1	4
Mexico	3	0	2	1	1	3	−2	2
France	3	0	1	2	2	5	−3	1

Final group standings
Group 2 winner

Team	Pld	W	D	L	GF	GA	GD	Pts
West Germany	3	2	1	0	7	1	+6	5
Argentina	3	2	1	0	4	1	+3	5
Spain	3	1	0	2	4	5	−1	2
Switzerland	3	0	0	3	1	9	−8	0

Opponent
Result
Knockout stage
Opponent
Result
Argentina
1–0
Quarter-finals
Uruguay
4–0
Portugal
2–1
Semi-finals
Soviet Union
2–1

== Match ==
=== Summary ===
==== Normal time ====
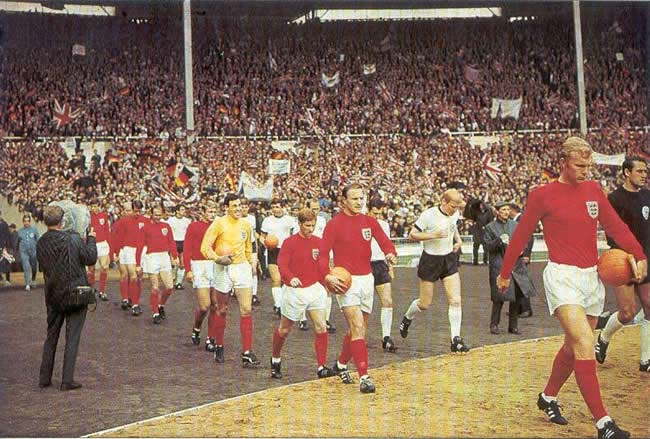
Both teams entered the pitch in front of 96,924 fans.

England, managed by Alf Ramsey and captained by Bobby Moore, won the toss and elected to kick off. After 12 minutes, Sigfried Held sent a cross into the English penalty area which Ray Wilson misheaded to Helmut Haller, who got his shot on target. Jack Charlton and goalkeeper Gordon Banks failed to stop the shot which went in, giving West Germany a 1–0 lead.

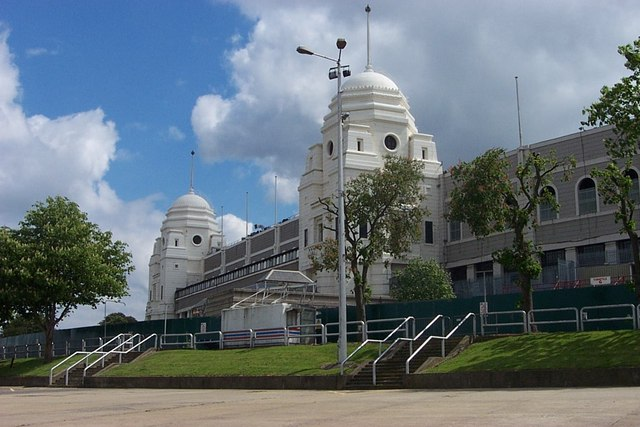
The original Wembley Stadium with its famous twin towers. It was demolished in 2002 to make way for the new Wembley Stadium, which opened in 2007.

In the 18th minute, Wolfgang Overath conceded a free kick, which Moore took immediately, floating a cross into the West German area, where Geoff Hurst rose unchallenged; his downward glancing header went into the net and levelled the scores at 1–1. The teams were level at half-time, and after 77 minutes England won a corner. Alan Ball delivered the ball to Geoff Hurst whose deflected shot from the edge of the area found Martin Peters. He produced the final shot, beating the West German keeper from eight yards to make the score 2–1 to England.

Germany pressed for an equaliser in the closing moments, and in the 89th minute Jack Charlton conceded a free kick for climbing on Uwe Seeler as they both went up for a header. The kick was taken by Lothar Emmerich, who struck it into George Cohen in the wall; the rebound fell to Held, who shot across the face of goal and into the body of Karl-Heinz Schnellinger. The ball deflected across the England six-yard box, wrong-footing the England defence and allowing Wolfgang Weber to level the score at 2–2 and force the match into extra time. Banks protested that the ball had struck Schnellinger on the arm, and reiterated the claim in his 2002 autobiography, but replays showed that it actually struck Schnellinger on the back.

==== Extra time ====
Geoff Hurst's "Wembley Goal"

England pressed forward and created several chances. In particular, with five minutes gone, Bobby Charlton struck the post and sent another shot just wide. With 11 minutes of extra time gone, Alan Ball put in a cross and Geoff Hurst swivelled and shot from close range. The ball hit the underside of the crossbar, bounced down and was cleared. The referee Gottfried Dienst was uncertain if it had been a goal and consulted his linesman, Tofiq Bahramov from Azerbaijan in the USSR, who indicated that it was, and the Swiss referee awarded the goal to the home team. The crowd and the audience of 400 million television viewers were left arguing whether the goal should have been given or not. The crossbar is now on display as part of the Wembley Stadium tour.

England's third goal has remained controversial ever since the match. According to the Laws of the Game the definition of a goal is when "the whole of the ball passes over the goal line". English supporters cited the good position of the linesman and the statement of Roger Hunt, the nearest England player to the ball, who claimed it was a goal and that was why he instantly turned away in celebration rather than attempting to tap the rebounding ball in. Modern studies using film analysis and computer simulation have shown that the whole ball never crossed the line – only 50% did. Both Duncan Gillies of the Visual Information Processing Group at Imperial College London and Ian Reid and Andrew Zisserman of the Department of Engineering Science at University of Oxford have stated that the ball would have needed to travel a further 18 ± 4 cm (7.1 ± 1.6 in) to fully cross the line. Some Germans cited possible bias of the Soviet linesman, especially as the USSR had just been defeated in the semi-finals by West Germany. On Sky Sports in 2016, the Monday Night Football team used statistical data from Opta, plus the Sky Pad touchscreen and virtual reality from EA Sports, to re-examine England's third goal in the 1966 FIFA World Cup final. After conducting an analysis, the duo concluded that the entire ball had crossed the goal line, meaning this goal is legitimate. Jamie Carragher said, "It has gone down in history – was it over the line, was it not? Thankfully, today we can put that all to bed." After the goal was given, England now led 3–2.

One minute before the end of play, the West Germans sent their defenders forward in a desperate attempt to score a last-minute equaliser. Winning the ball, Bobby Moore picked out the unmarked Geoff Hurst with a long pass, which Hurst carried forward while some spectators began streaming onto the field. Hurst, as he later revealed, decided that, if he was not going to score, he needed to boot the ball into the crowd as far as he could, to prevent Germany getting back up. With German midfielder Wolfgang Overath now chasing him, Hurst booted the ball with his left foot as hard as he could but misfired. The ball instead went straight to the top corner of Hans Tilkowski's net, sealing a historic hat-trick and helping England win 4–2. The goal gave rise to one of the most famous calls in English football history, when BBC commentator Kenneth Wolstenholme described the situation as follows:

"And here comes Hurst. He's got... (Wolstenholme gets distracted by some of the crowd now entering the field.) some people are on the pitch, they think it's all over. (Hurst boots the ball into Tilkowski's net) It is now! It's four!"

One of the balls from the final is on display in the National Football Museum in Manchester.

=== Details ===
30 July 1966
15:00 BST

England	4–2 (a.e.t.)	West Germany
Hurst 18', 101', 120'; Peters 78'		Haller 12'; Weber 89'

Wembley Stadium, London
Attendance: 96,924
Referee: Gottfried Dienst (Switzerland)

England	West Germany

GK	1	Gordon Banks
RB	2	George Cohen
CB	5	Jack Charlton
CB	6	Bobby Moore (c)
LB	3	Ray Wilson
DM	4	Nobby Stiles
CM	7	Alan Ball
CM	9	Bobby Charlton
CM	16	Martin Peters	(yellow card) 20'
CF	21	Roger Hunt
CF	10	Geoff Hurst
Manager:
Alf Ramsey

GK	1	Hans Tilkowski
SW	5	Willi Schulz
RB	2	Horst-Dieter Höttges
CB	6	Wolfgang Weber
LB	3	Karl-Heinz Schnellinger
CM	8	Helmut Haller
CM	4	Franz Beckenbauer
CM	12	Wolfgang Overath
LW	11	Lothar Emmerich
CF	9	Uwe Seeler (c)
CF	10	Sigfried Held
Manager:
Helmut Schön

Officials

- Linesman: Tofiq Bahramov (Soviet Union)
- Linesman: Karol Galba (Czechoslovakia)

Match rules

- 90 minutes
- 30 minutes of extra time if necessary
- Replay if scores still level:
  - 19:30 BST, Tuesday, 2 August 1966
  - Wembley Stadium, London
- No substitutions permitted

== Aftermath ==
=== Champions photograph and statue ===
The iconic image which became the basis for the sculpture below.

One of the enduring images of the celebrations in Wembley immediately after the game was the picture of the captain Bobby Moore holding the Jules Rimet Trophy aloft, on the shoulders of Geoff Hurst and Ray Wilson, together with Martin Peters. In recognition of Moore and other West Ham United players' contribution to the win, the club and Newham Borough Council jointly commissioned a statue of this scene.

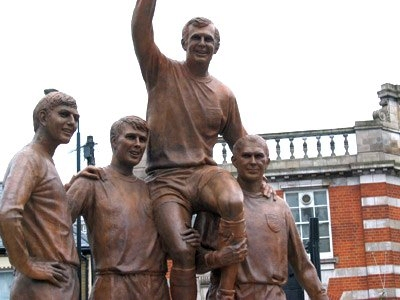
The World Cup Sculpture featuring Moore with the World Cup trophy, on the shoulders of Geoff Hurst and Ray Wilson, together with Martin Peters

On 28 April 2003, the then Prince Andrew, as president of The Football Association, duly unveiled the World Cup Sculpture (also called The Champions) in a prominent place near West Ham's ground, at the time, the Boleyn Ground, at the junction of Barking Road and Green Street. The 13-foot (4 m)-high bronze piece was sculpted by Philip Jackson and weighed 4 tonnes.

=== Cultural impact ===
==== Broadcasting and viewership ====
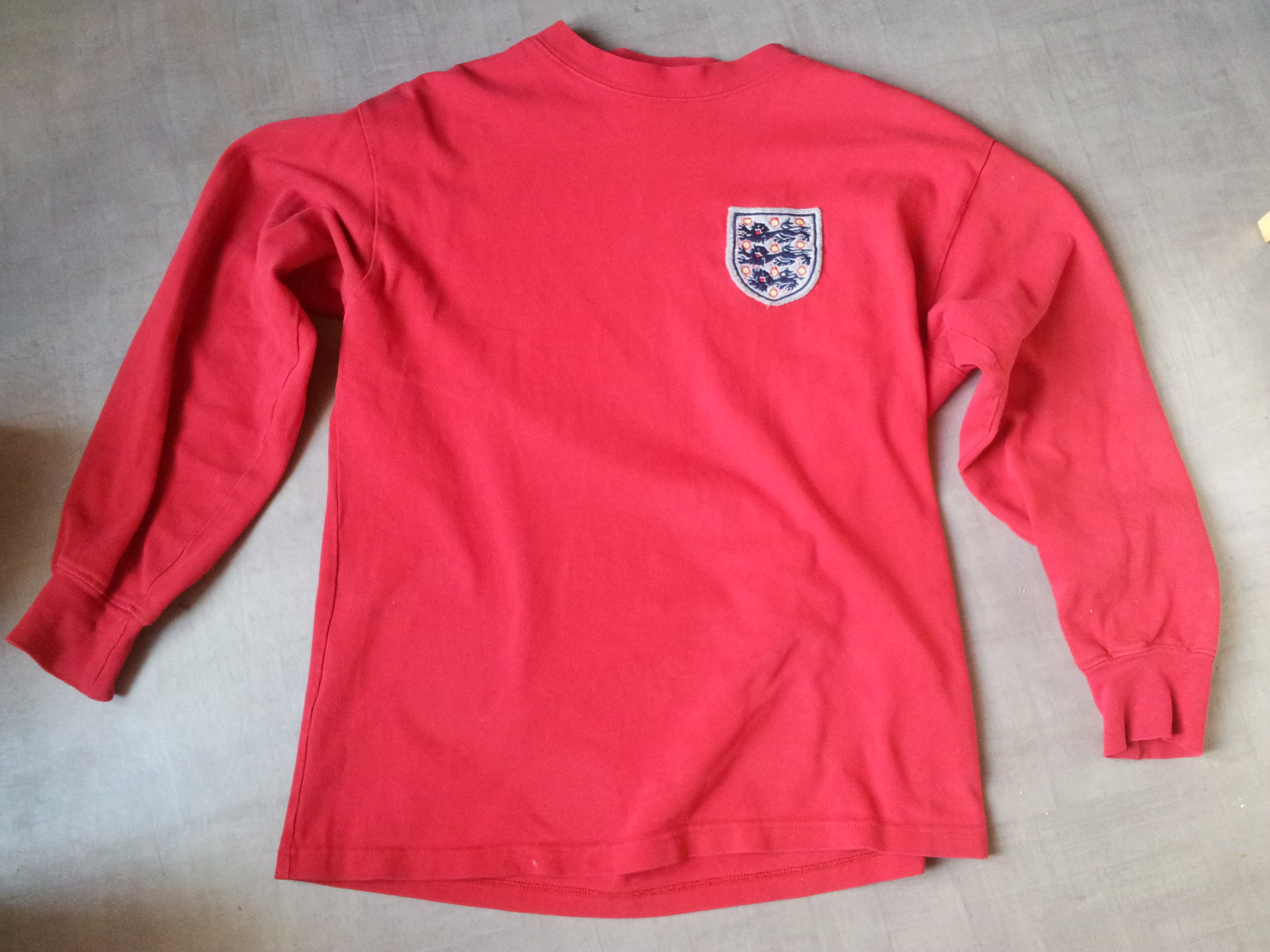
Replica of the England shirt worn for the final. In a 2019 poll it was voted England's greatest ever shirt.

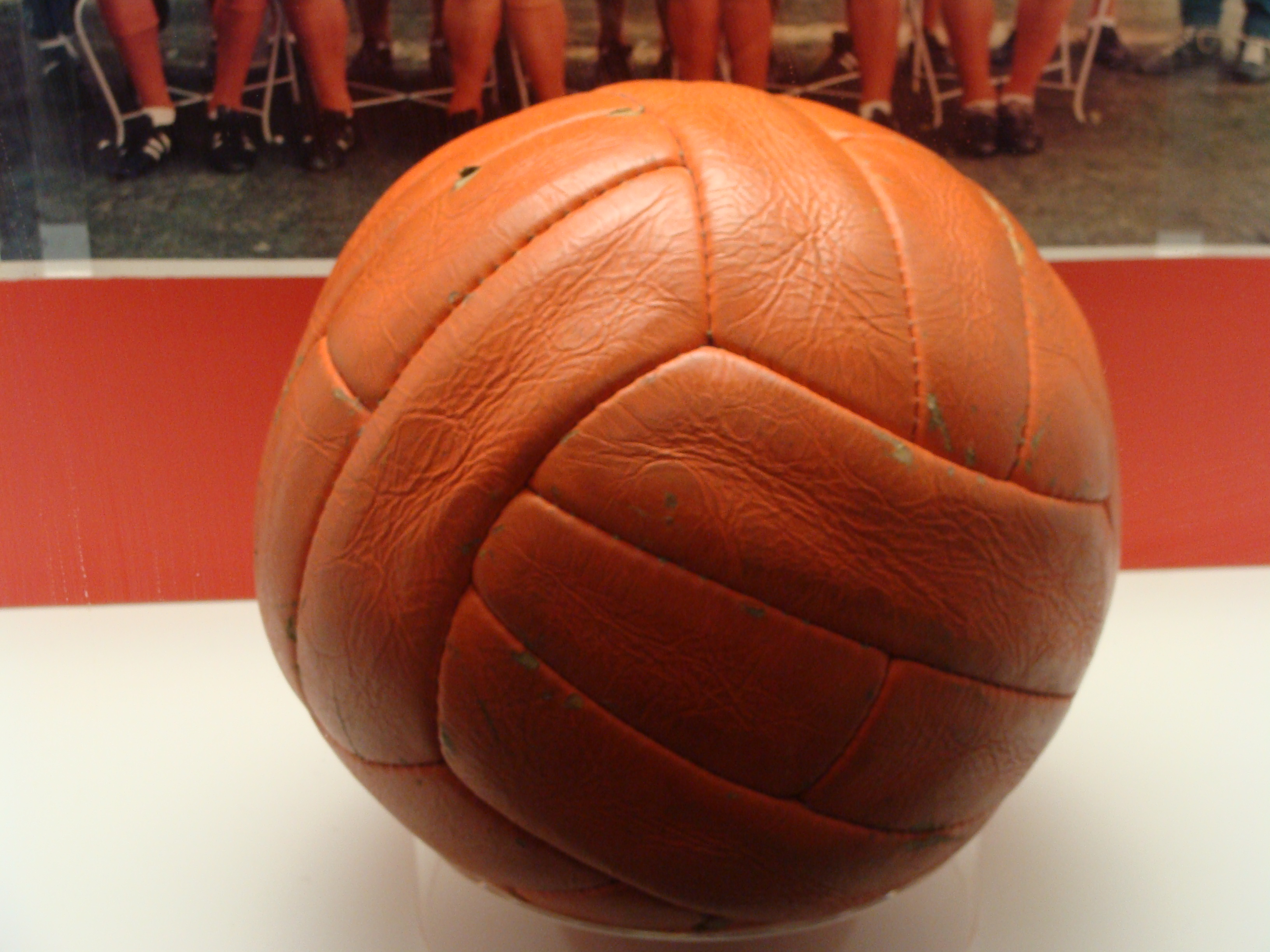
The Slazenger ball used in the final, National Football Museum, Manchester

The final is the most watched event ever on British television, as of July 2021, attracting 32.30 million viewers.

==== Influence ====
In Germany, a goal resulting from a shot bouncing off the crossbar and hitting the line is called a Wembley-Tor (Wembley Goal) due to the controversial nature of Hurst's second goal. This goal has been parodied many times. Some of the most notable include:

- England's third goal was referenced in a 2006 Adidas advertisement, where English midfielder Frank Lampard takes a shot at German keeper Oliver Kahn, and a similar event happens. On 27 June 2010 at that year's World Cup a similar goal by Lampard was wrongly disallowed (TV replays showed the ball landing past the goal line before bouncing away) which would have levelled the second-round game against Germany 2–2 (Germany won 4–1).
- Kenneth Wolstenholme's commentary on the third goal that bounced on the line, "It's a goal!" was used (along with the sound of breaking glass) in the tape-looped coda of an early version of The Beatles' song "Glass Onion", available on the album Anthology 3.

In August 1966 a special 4d stamp marked ENGLAND WINNERS was issued by the Royal Mail to celebrate the victory. It soared in value to up to 15 shillings each on the back of public enthusiasm for the victory before falling back in value when the public realised it was not rare.

The World Cup win features in the song "Three Lions" (known by its chorus "Football's Coming Home"), the unofficial anthem of the England football team. England's win in the final also helped fans to create the "Two World Wars and One World Cup" chant.

=== Belated presentations ===
Haller collected the match ball after the final whistle, conforming to a German tradition that the losing team keeps the ball. In the build-up to Euro 96 in England, English tabloid newspapers suggested that a British tradition ought to apply, of giving the match ball to the scorer of a hat trick. A consortium of Daily Mirror, Virgin Group, and Eurostar paid Haller £80,000 for the ball and arranged a photo shoot at which he symbolically presented it to Hurst. The ball was then displayed in Waterloo Eurostar terminal, where Hurst and Haller's signatures faded in the sunlight. It was subsequently lent to the National Football Museum in Manchester.

From 1930 to 1974, only those who played in the Final received World Cup winners' medals. In the 2000s FIFA retrospectively awarded medals to the other players and staff of each winning squad. Medals were presented at a ceremony at 10 Downing Street in London on 10 June 2009 to the relevant members of England's 1966 squad, or representatives in the case of those, such as manager Ramsey, who had died.

== See also ==
- England–Germany football rivalry
- Ghost goal
- Sixty Six (film), a 2006 film about the match
- England at the FIFA World Cup
- Germany at the FIFA World Cup

== Bibliography ==
- Hamilton, Duncan (2023). Answered Prayers: England and the 1966 World Cup. United Kingdom: Quercus Publishing. ISBN 9781529419986.
