= Tofiq Bahramov =

Soviet football referee (1925–1993)

- Tofiq Bəhramov
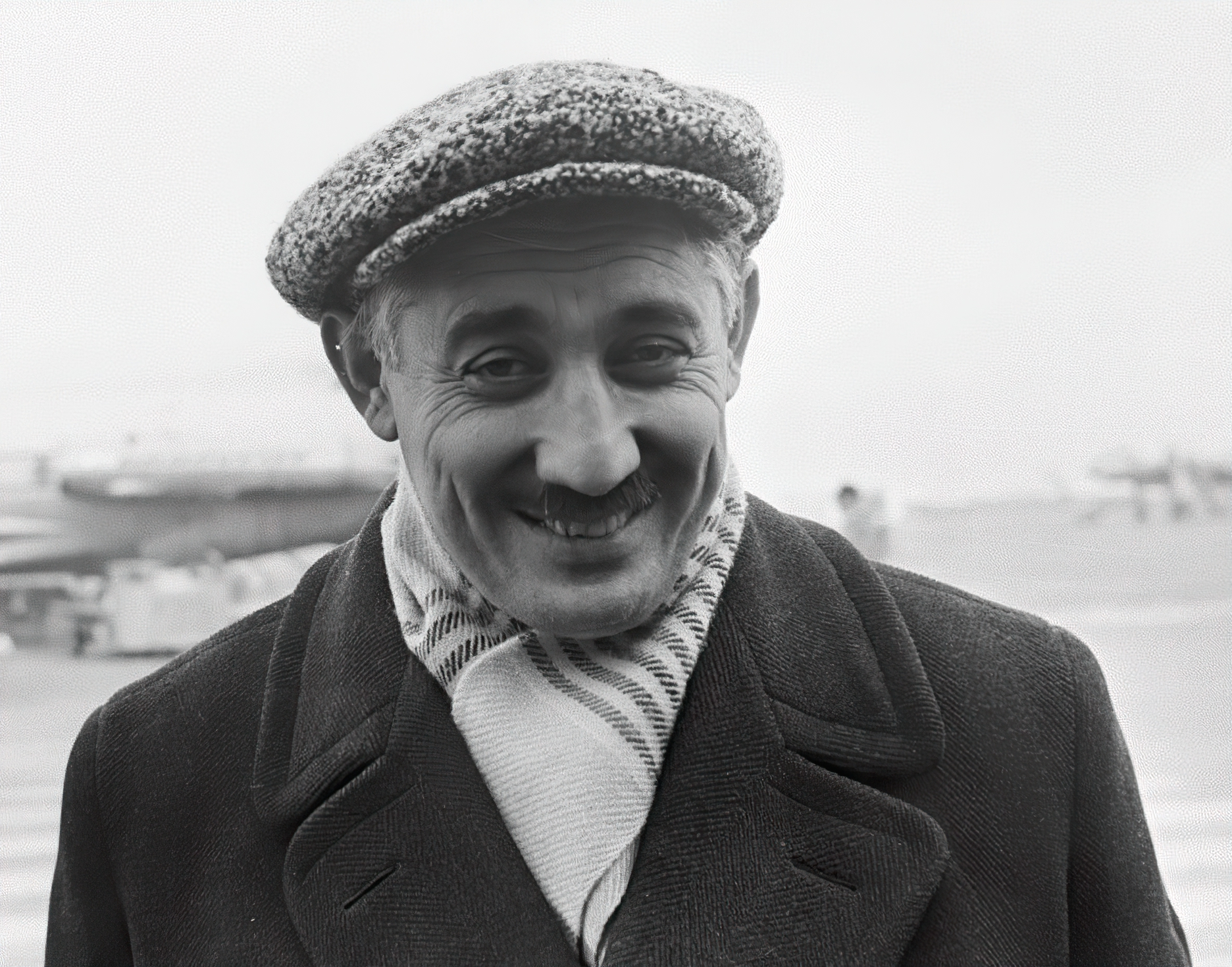
- Bahramov in 1967
- Born: Tofiq Bəhram oğlu Bəhramov; 29 January 1925; Shusha, Azerbaijan SSR, Transcaucasian SFSR, USSR
- Died: 26 March 1993 (aged 68); Baku, Azerbaijan
- Occupations: Football player and referee

Signature
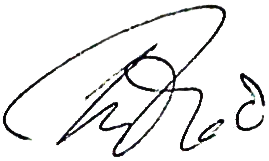

Tofiq Bahramov (Azerbaijani: Tofiq Bəhramov; Russian: Тофик Бахрамов; 29 January 1925 – 26 March 1993) was a Soviet footballer and football referee from Azerbaijan.

He was the linesman who helped to award England's controversial third goal in the 1966 FIFA World Cup Final against West Germany. He came to be wrongly referred to as "the Russian linesman" in England as a result of his decision and his Soviet citizenship, although he was not Russian but Azerbaijani.

After his death in 1993, Azerbaijan's then national stadium was renamed the Tofiq Bahramov Republican Stadium in his honor.

== Career ==
Bahramov was originally a footballer playing for Neftçi PFK, but a serious leg injury prevented him from continuing his playing career and he became a referee. He was elected onto the FIFA panel of referees in 1964. In the 1966 World Cup he officiated as a linesman for both the opening match and the Final, and refereed a first round match. In the 1970 World Cup he officiated at three matches including a semi-final. In 1972, he refereed the first leg of the UEFA Cup Final between the English clubs Wolverhampton Wanderers and Tottenham Hotspur. After retiring as a referee, he subsequently served for some years as general secretary of the Football Federation of Azerbaijan.

=== "Wembley Goal" ===
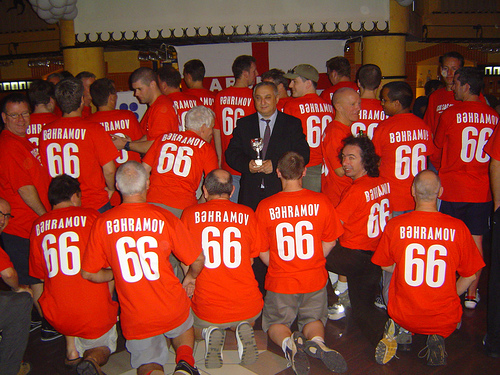
English fans wearing Bəhramov 66 T-shirts. Tofiq Bahramov's son is standing in the middle.

In the 1966 World Cup Final, with the score at 2–2 and after 11 minutes of the first period of extra time, Geoff Hurst of England fired a shot on goal which bounced off the crossbar sharply downwards, hit the ground, and then spun backwards away from the goal. There were some moments of indecision by referee Gottfried Dienst before he noticed that Bahramov, who was the linesman at that end of the ground, was signalling to him. Eventually, Dienst awarded a goal to England, who went on to win the game 4–2.

The decision to award the third England goal is still debated. Some German commentators and football historians have argued that Bahramov made a mistake in awarding the goal. The goal has entered the German vernacular, as any situation in which a ball hits the crossbar and is reflected downwards, landing just before or behind the goal line before spinning back into the penalty area, is described as a "Wembley-Tor". In England, many newspapers referred to the "Russian linesman" who awarded the goal, as Azerbaijan was part of the Soviet Union at the time, and the nickname became widespread, and for many years, his real name was less well known in England.

According to the Laws of the Game, for a goal to be awarded, the ball must cross the goal line, with its full diameter behind the full width of the line. Some German players later claimed to have seen chalk dust, suggesting to them that the ball had not crossed the line. Roger Hunt claimed to have seen the ball bounce behind the line.

When Bahramov wrote his memoirs, he stated that he believed the ball had bounced back not from the crossbar, but from the net, so the further movement of the ball was already insignificant, and not visible for him either. Bahramov loved refereeing and the game of football in general, and described football matches as, "duels...full of unforeseen turns and even real miracles. And who does not want to be a magician if even for just 90 minutes?"

== Legacy ==
After his death in 1993, the national stadium of Azerbaijan was renamed the Tofiq Bahramov Republican Stadium.

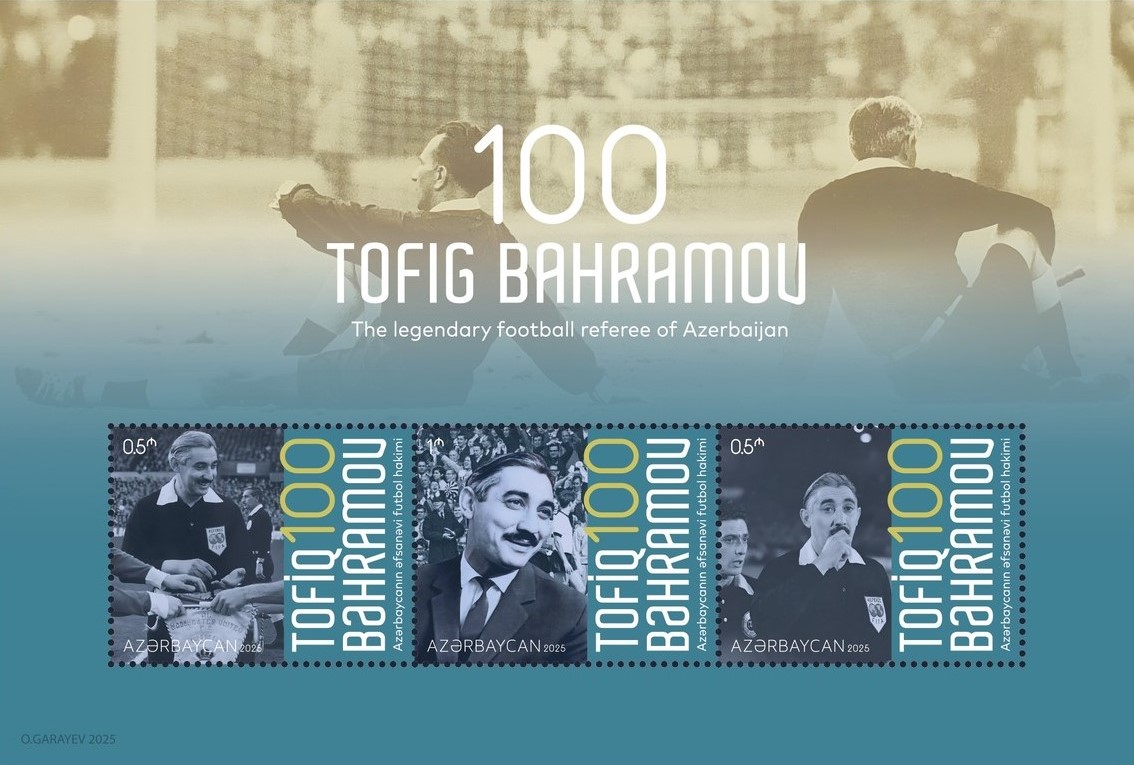
Stamps issued in honor of the 100th anniversary of Tofiq Bahramov

The Azerbaijan national stadium in Baku is named the Tofiq Bahramov Stadium in his honour. It was renamed in 1993, shortly after Azeri independence and Bahramov's death, having previously been named after the Soviet leader Vladimir Lenin.

When England were drawn in the same group as Azerbaijan in qualifying for the 2006 FIFA World Cup, a ceremony was held at the stadium to honour his memory, with attendees including Geoff Hurst, Michel Platini and Sepp Blatter. A statue of him was also unveiled as he became the first referee to have a stadium named after him. His son Bahram Bahramov met representatives of the English fans and expressed his pleasure that the famous "Russian linesman" of 1966 had finally regained his true nationality. "Now that Azerbaijan is independent it’s very right for him to be remembered as a member of the Azeri nation. People like Tofiq Bahramov are only born once in a hundred years".

On January 29, 2025, commemorative postage stamps were issued to mark the 100th anniversary of Tofiq Bahramov at the initiative of AFFA. The product, prepared by "Azərpoçt", is presented as a block consisting of three stamps. The stamps feature a portrait of Tofiq Bahramov along with photographs from his refereeing career.
