= Richard Ackerschott =

German footballer (1921–2002)

Personal information
- Date of birth: 10 December 1921
- Place of birth: Wuppertal, Germany
- Date of death: 31 March 2002 (aged 80)
- Place of death: Bremen, Germany
- Position: Defender

Senior career*
Years	Team	Apps	(Gls)
–1958	Werder Bremen		

Managerial career
- 1968: Werder Bremen
- * Club domestic league appearances and goals

Richard Ackerschott (10 December 1921 – 31 March 2002) was a German footballer who played as a defender for Werder Bremen. He made about 800 appearances for the club.
