= Wolfgang Weber =

German footballer (born 1944)

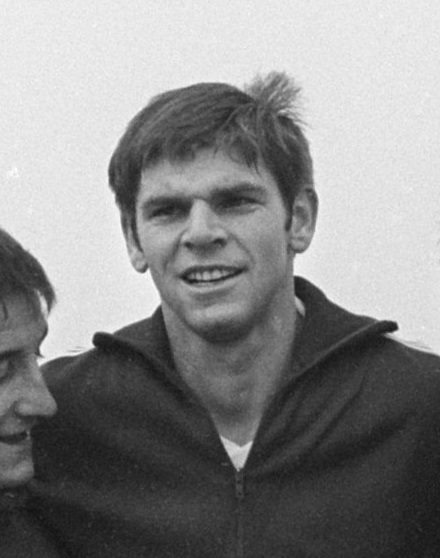
- Weber in 1968

Personal information
- Date of birth: 26 June 1944 (age 82)
- Place of birth: Schlawe, Pomerania, Germany
- Height: 1.77 m (5 ft 10 in)
- Position: Defender

Youth career
- –1962: SpVgg Porz

Senior career*
Years	Team	Apps	(Gls)
1963–1978	1. FC Köln	356	(21)

International career
1964–1974	West Germany	53	(2)

Managerial career
- 1978–1980: Werder Bremen
Medal record
Men's football
Representing West Germany
FIFA World Cup
Runner-up	1966 England
Third place	1970 Mexico
- * Club domestic league appearances and goals

Wolfgang Weber (born 26 June 1944) is a German former footballer who played as a defender. He is best remembered for scoring the last-minute equaliser for West Germany at the 1966 FIFA World Cup final.

== Playing career ==
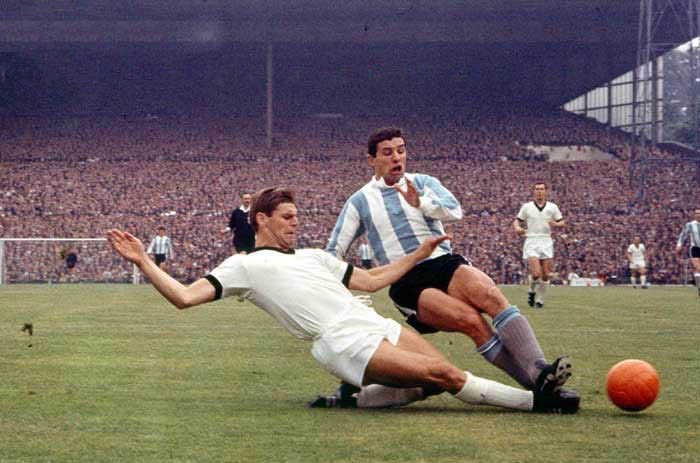
Weber and Luis Artime at the 1966 FIFA World Cup

Weber, a central defender with 1. FC Köln in 356 Bundesliga matches, poked the ball home with almost the last kick of the game at Wembley in 1966 to make the score 2–2. Opponents England went on to win 4–2 in extra time.

Weber played for Köln between 1963 and 1978 and won 53 caps for his country, scoring just one other goal. He also represented West Germany at the 1968 European Championships and the 1970 World Cup. His last appearance for his country was in 1974.

== Later life ==
From summer 1978 until his dismissal in January 1980, Weber coached the Bundesliga side Werder Bremen, but was sacked in the relegation struggle of the North German side in his second season. His successor Fritz Langner, who acted in cooperation with Rudi Assauer, could not avoid the drop to the 2. Bundesliga in the later stages of Bremen's 1979–80 campaign.

In retirement, Weber has been involved with the German branch of the Special Olympics.
