= Fritz Langner =

German footballer (1912–1998)

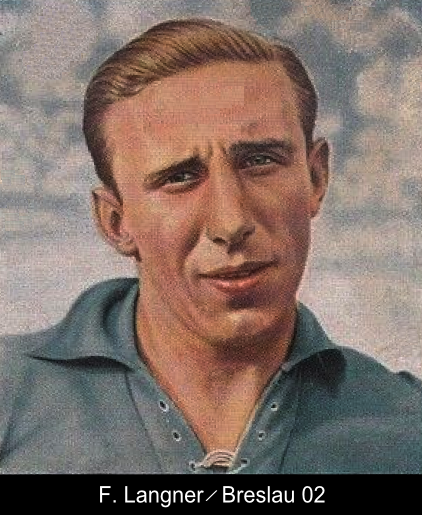
- Langner in 1937

Personal information
- Date of birth: 8 August 1912
- Place of birth: Breslau, German Empire (now Wrocław, Poland)
- Date of death: 25 January 1998 (aged 85)
- Position: Midfielder

Senior career*
Years	Team	Apps	(Gls)
1929–1933	Vereinigte Breslauer Sportfreunde		
1933–1945	Breslauer SpVgg 02		
1945–1946	Eckernförder SV		
1946	Itzehoer SV		
1946–1947	Concordia Hamburg		

Managerial career
- 1945–1946: Eckernförder SV
- 1948–1952: Concordia Hamburg
- 1952–1955: SG Düren 99
- 1955–1962: Westfalia Herne
- 1962–1964: Borussia Mönchengladbach
- 1964–1967: Schalke 04
- 1967–1969: Werder Bremen
- 1969: 1860 Munich
- 1970: Freiburger FC
- 1970–1971: VfL Osnabrück
- 1971: 1. FC Nürnberg
- 1972: Werder Bremen
- 1972–1973: SSV Hagen
- 1973–1974: SpVgg Erkenschwick
- 1974–1975: SpVgg Erkenschwick
- 1980: Werder Bremen
- * Club domestic league appearances and goals

Fritz Langner (8 August 1912 – 25 January 1998) was a German football player and manager.
