= 1956–57 West Ham United F.C. season =

English football team season

West Ham United
1956–57 season
- Chairman: Reg Pratt
- Manager: Ted Fenton
- Stadium: Boleyn Ground
- Second Division: Second Division 8th
- FA Cup: Fourth round
- Top goalscorer: League: Eddie Lewis; Billy Dare (9); All: John Dick (13)
Home colours

The 1956–57 season was West Ham's seventeenth season in the Second Division since their relegation in season 1931–32. The club were managed by Ted Fenton and the team captain was Noel Cantwell.

== Season summary ==
West Ham finished eighth and were at no time in either of the top two, promotion places. John Dick was the top scorer with 13 goals in all competitions. Top scorers in the league were Billy Dare and Eddie Lewis with eight goals. Malcolm Musgrove made the most appearances; 44 in all competitions. West Ham made the fourth round of the FA Cup before being eliminated by Everton.

=== Second Division ===
Pos	Team	Pld	W	D	L	GF	GA	GAv	Pts
6	Middlesbrough	42	19	10	13	84	60	1.400	48
7	Sheffield United	42	19	8	15	87	76	1.145	46
8	West Ham United	42	19	8	15	59	63	0.937	46
9	Bristol Rovers	42	18	9	15	81	67	1.209	45
10	Swansea Town	42	19	7	16	90	90	1.000	45

Rules for classification: 1) Points; 2) Goal average; 3) Goals scored

== Results ==
West Ham United's score comes first

=== Legend ===
Win	Draw	Loss

=== Football League Second Division ===
Date	Opponent	Venue	Result	Attendance	Scorers
18 August 1956	Fulham	A	4–1	25,809	Grice, Dare, Tucker
20 August 1956	Blackburn Rovers	H	1–3	19,727	Tucker
25 August 1956	Swansea City	H	1–2	17,067	Tucker
27 August 1956	Blackburn Rovers	A	2–0	15,003	Blackburn, Dick
1 September 1956	Lincoln City	A	2–0	13,131	Stroud (2)
3 September 1956	Liverpool	H	1–1	25,671	O'Farrell
8 September 1956	Rotherham United	H	1–1	19,448	Dare
15 September 1956	Port Vale	A	0–0	17,582	
22 September 1956	Barnsley	H	2–0	19,412	Dare, Dick
29 September 1956	Sheffield United	A	0–1	23,529	
6 October 1956	Leyton Orient	A	2–1	24,685	Musgrove, Willsemse (og)
13 October 1956	Huddersfield Town	H	0–2	22,643	
20 October 1956	Bristol Rovers	H	1–1	24,404	Dick
27 October 1956	Grimsby Town	H	0–1	17,579	
3 November 1956	Doncaster Rovers	A	0–3	13,071	
10 November 1956	Stoke City	H	1–0	17,668	Tucker
17 November 1956	Middlesbrough	A	1–3	31,513	Tucker
24 November 1956	Leicester City	H	2–1	19,789	Lewis, Tucker
1 December 1956	Bury	A	3–3	8,757	Musgrove, Dick, Parker
8 December 1956	Notts County	H	2–1	14,875	Roy Smith, Dick
15 December 1956	Fulham	H	2–1	18,119	Bond, Musgrove
22 December 1956	Swansea City	A	1–3	12,091	Lewis
25 December 1956	Nottingham Forest	H	2–1	16,300	Lewis, Musgrove
29 December 1956	Lincoln City	H	2–1	17,790	Dare (2)
12 January 1957	Rotherham United	A	1–0	11,090	Musgrove
19 January 1957	Port Vale	A	1–0	17,229	Dick, John Smith
2 February 1957	Barnsley	A	2–1	15,931	Dare, Dick
9 February 1957	Sheffield United	H	3–2	22,130	Cantwell, John Smith, Lewis
16 February 1957	Leyton Orient	H	2–1	27,182	Lewis, Lansdowne
23 February 1957	Huddersfield Town	A	2–6	25,284	John Smith, Lewis
2 March 1957	Bristol Rovers	H	1–2	22,354	Lewis
9 March 1957	Grimsby Town	A	1–2	14,026	Allison
16 March 1957	Doncaster Rovers	H	1–1	15,336	Lewis
23 March 1957	Stoke City	A	1–0	19,794	Musgrove
30 March 1957	Middlesbrough	H	1–1	15,166	Allison
6 April 1957	Leicester City	A	3–5	33,338	Allison, Musgrove (2)
13 April 1957	Bury	H	1–0	9,043	Dare
15 April 1957	Nottingham Forest	A	0–3	24,251	
19 April 1957	Bristol City	A	1–1	18,317	Allison
20 April 1957	Notts County	A	1–4	17,803	John Smith
22 April 1957	Bristol City	H	3–1	9,343	Dare, Lewis, Dick
27 April 1957	Liverpool	A	0–1	36,236	

=== FA Cup ===
Round	Date	Opponent	Venue	Result	Attendance	Goalscorers
R3	5 January 1957	Grimsby Town	H	5–3	24,500	Lewis, Smith (2), Dick Musgrove
R4	26 January 1957	Everton	H	1–2	55,245	Dare

== Squad ==
Note: Flags indicate national team as defined under FIFA eligibility rules; some limited exceptions apply. Players may hold more than one non-FIFA nationality.

Pos.	Nation	Player
DF	ENG	Malcolm Allison
FW	ENG	Alan Blackburn
DF	ENG	John Bond
DF	ENG	Ken Brown
DF	IRL	Noel Cantwell (captain)
DF	ENG	Fred Cooper
FW	ENG	Billy Dare
FW	SCO	John Dick
FW	ENG	Albert Foan
GK	ENG	Ernie Gregory
MF	ENG	Mike Grice
DF	SCO	Robert Gordon Johnstone
MF	ENG	Bill Lansdowne
FW	ENG	Eddie Lewis
MF	ENG	Andy Malcolm

Pos.	Nation	Player
MF	ENG	Malcolm Musgrove
DF	ENG	Andy Nelson
FW	CAN	Mick Newman
MF	IRL	Frank O'Farrell
FW	ENG	Harry Obeney
MF	ENG	Derek Parker
FW	ENG	Malcolm Pyke
MF	ENG	John Smith
FW	ENG	Roy Smith
FW	ENG	Roy Stroud
FW	ENG	Ken Tucker
MF	ENG	Doug Wragg
DF	ENG	George Wright
GK	SCO	Bob Wyllie
