= 1957–58 West Ham United F.C. season =

English football team season

West Ham United
1957–58 season
- Chairman: Reg Pratt
- Manager: Ted Fenton
- Stadium: Boleyn Ground
- Second Division: 1st
- FA Cup: Fifth round
- Top goalscorer: League: John Dick (21); All: John Dick (26)
Home colours

The 1957–58 season was West Ham's nineteenth season in the Second Division since their relegation in season 1931–32. The club were managed by Ted Fenton and the team captain was Noel Cantwell.

== Season summary ==
The season started badly for West Ham with only three wins from their first 10 games. However, after September 1957 they lost only three games hitting the first place in the league on 18 January 1958. They were in first place for all but one week until the end of the season as they finished as champions. John Dick was the top scorer with 26 goals in all competitions and 21 in the league. The next highest scorer was Vic Keeble with 24. Dick and Ken Brown made the most appearances; 48 in all competitions. West Ham made the fifth round of the FA Cup before being eliminated 3–2 by Fulham.

The season saw the last West Ham appearance for future football manager Malcolm Allison who had to retire following the removal of a lung after contracting tuberculosis. It also saw the first appearance by 1965 Cup Winners' Cup winner, Joe Kirkup. In this season, West Ham created a player of the season award, the Hammer of the Year award. The first winner was Andy Malcolm. This season also saw the club break its record for the biggest victory. On 8 March 1958 they beat Rotherham United, 8–0 with John Dick scoring four goals.

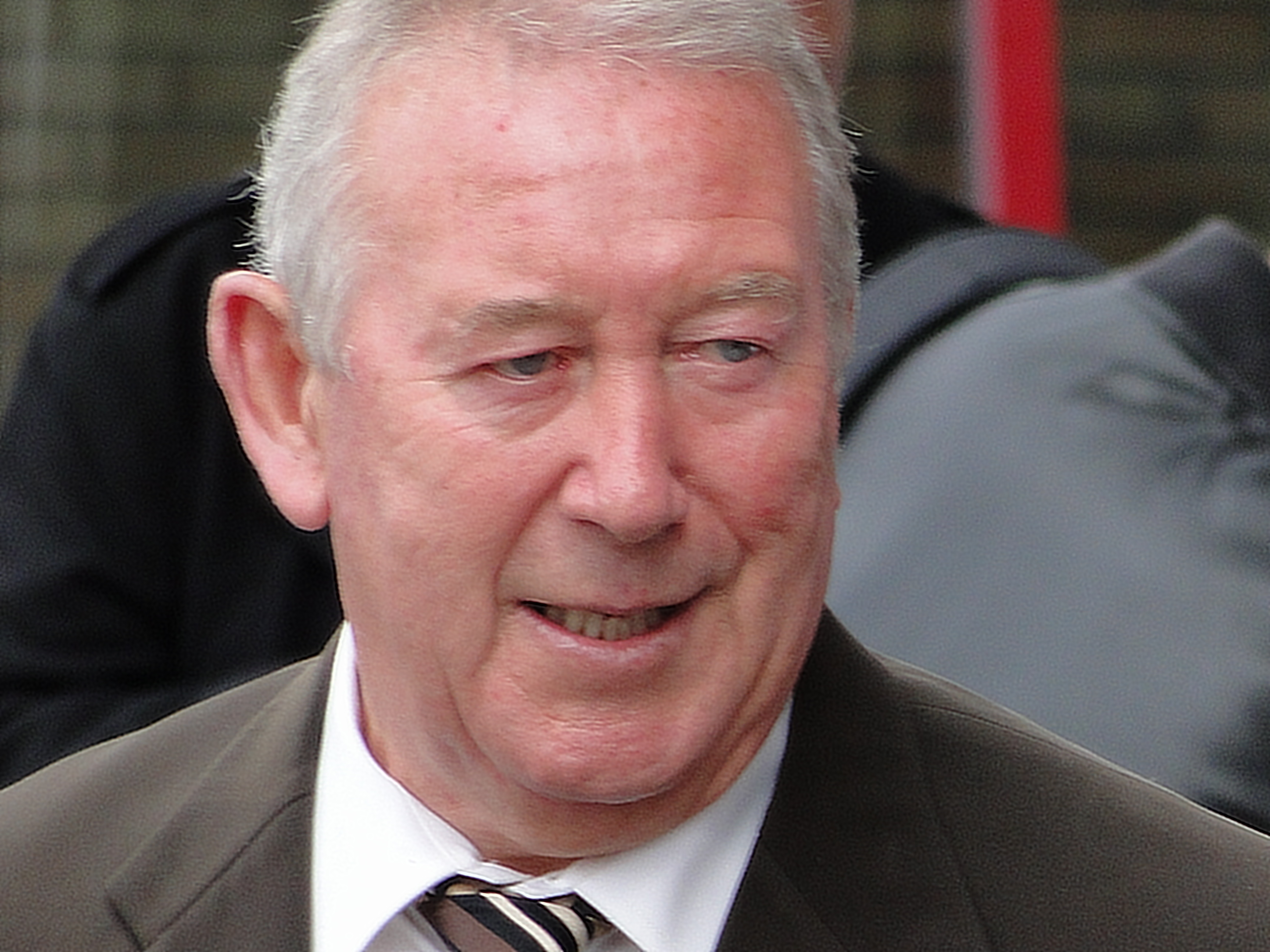
Equal highest number of appearances this season – Ken Brown

=== Second Division ===
Pos	Team	Pld	W	D	L	GF	GA	GAv	Pts	Qualification or relegation
1	West Ham United (C, P)	42	23	11	8	101	54	1.870	57	Promotion to the First Division
2	Blackburn Rovers (P)	42	22	12	8	93	57	1.632	56	Promotion to the First Division
3	Charlton Athletic	42	24	7	11	107	69	1.551	55	
4	Liverpool	42	22	10	10	79	54	1.463	54	
5	Fulham	42	20	12	10	97	59	1.644	52	

Rules for classification: 1) Points; 2) Goal average; 3) Goals scored
(C) Champions; (P) Promoted

== Results ==
West Ham United's score comes first

=== Legend ===
Win	Draw	Loss

=== Football League Second Division ===
Date	Opponent	Venue	Result	Attendance	Scorers
24 August 1957	Lincoln City	H	2–2	18,907	Allison, Dare
26 August 1957	Blackburn Rovers	A	1–2	18,845	Dare
31 August 1957	Bristol Rovers	A	3–2	26,110	Dare (3)
2 September 1957	Blackburn Rovers	H	1–1	24,009	Dare
7 September 1957	Derby County	H	2–1	18,955	Cantwell, Smith
9 September 1957	Sheffield United	H	0–3	21,746	
14 September 1957	Swansea City	A	2–3	19,352	Malcolm, Dare
16 September 1957	Sheffield United	A	1–2	7,710	Dare
21 September 1957	Fulham	H	3–2	23,855	Cantwell, Dare (2)
28 September 1957	Barnsley	A	0–1	12,182	
5 October 1957	Leyton Orient	H	3–2	25,990	Lansdowne, Smith, Lewis
12 October 1957	Charlton Athletic	A	3–0	30,437	Smith, Dare, Musgrove
19 October 1957	Doncaster Rovers	H	1–1	20,216	Keeble
26 October 1957	Rotherham United	A	2–1	8,971	Bond, Dick
2 November 1957	Huddersfield Town	H	5–2	21,525	Cantwell, Keeble, Dick, Musgrove (2)
9 November 1957	Grimsby Town	A	2–1	12,088	Smith, Dick
16 November 1957	Stoke City	H	5–0	23,171	Dare, Keeble (3), Dick
23 November 1957	Bristol City	A	1–1	22,305	Dick
30 November 1957	Cardiff City	H	1–1	23,954	Dick
7 December 1957	Liverpool	A	1–1	34,030	Dick
14 December 1957	Middlesbrough	H	2–1	20,737	Bond, Musgrove
21 December 1957	Lincoln City	A	6–1	8,384	Newman, Dick (2), Keeble (2), Musgrove
25 December 1957	Ipswich Town	H	1–1	25,515	Newman
26 December 1957	Ipswich Town	A	1–2	21,899	Bond
28 December 1957	Bristol Rovers	H	6–1	28,095	Smith (3), Keeble (2), Dick
11 January 1958	Derby County	A	3–2	21,564	Bond, Dick, Musgrove
18 January 1958	Swansea City	H	6–2	27,277	Bond, Cantwell, Musgrove, Dick, Keeble (2)
1 February 1958	Fulham	A	2–2	42,195	Lewis, Musgrove
8 February 1958	Barnsley	H	1–1	27,182	Lewis
20 February 1958	Leyton Orient	A	4–1	25,284	Dare, Smith, Keeble, Dick
22 February 1958	Bristol City	H	3–2	22,795	Malcolm, Dare, Keeble
1 March 1958	Doncaster Rovers	A	2–1	12,411	Smith, Keeble
8 March 1958	Rotherham United	H	8–0	25,040	Smith (2), Dick (2), Keeble (4)
15 March 1958	Huddersfield Town	A	1–3	19,093	Grice
22 March 1958	Grimsby Town	H	2–0	25,152	Musgrove, Richardson (og)
29 March 1958	Stoke City	A	4–1	14,517	Grice, Keeble (2), Dick
4 April 1958	Notts County	H	3–1	29,866	Bond (2), Cruickshank (og)
5 April 1958	Charlton Athletic	H	0–0	30,208	
8 April 1958	Notts County	A	0–1	18,317	
12 April 1958	Cardiff City	A	3–0	17,596	Malcolm, Dick (2)
19 April 1958	Liverpool	H	1–1	37,734	Bond
26 April 1958	Middlesbrough	A	3–1	30,526	Keeble, Dick, Musgrove

=== FA Cup ===
Round	Date	Opponent	Venue	Result	Attendance	Goalscorers
R3	4 January 1958	Blackpool	H	5–1	34,000	Keeble (3), Dick (2)
R4	25 January 1958	Stockport County	H	3–2	25,924	Lewis (2), Keeble
R5	15 February 1958	Fulham	H	2–3	37,500	Bond, Grice

== Squad ==
Note: Flags indicate national team as defined under FIFA eligibility rules; some limited exceptions apply. Players may hold more than one non-FIFA nationality.

Pos.	Nation	Player
DF	ENG	Malcolm Allison
FW	ENG	Alan Blackburn
DF	ENG	John Bond
DF	ENG	Ken Brown
DF	IRL	Noel Cantwell (captain)
DF	ENG	Fred Cooper
FW	ENG	Billy Dare
FW	SCO	John Dick
GK	ENG	Ernie Gregory
MF	ENG	Mike Grice
FW	ENG	Vic Keeble
DF	ENG	Joe Kirkup

Pos.	Nation	Player
MF	ENG	Bill Lansdowne
FW	ENG	Eddie Lewis
MF	ENG	Andy Malcolm
MF	ENG	Malcolm Musgrove
DF	ENG	Andy Nelson
FW	CAN	Mick Newman
MF	ENG	Malcolm Pyke
GK	ENG	Brian Rhodes
MF	ENG	John Smith
MF	ENG	Doug Wragg
DF	ENG	George Wright
GK	SCO	Bob Wyllie
