= 1963–64 Queens Park Rangers F.C. season =

English football club season

Queens Park Rangers
1963-64 season
- Chairman: Albert Hittinger / Bernard Baker (February 1964)
- Manager: Alec Stock
- Stadium: Loftus Road
- Football League Third Division: 15th
- FA Cup: Third Round
- Football League Cup: First Round
- London Challenge Cup: Round One
- Top goalscorer: League: Brian Bedford 23; All: Brian Bedford 25
- Highest home attendance: 12141 Vs Gillingham 16 November 1963
- Lowest home attendance: 3,876 Vs Crewe Alexandra 7 March 1964
- Average home league attendance: 7,812
- Biggest win: 4-1 Vs Gillingham (6 November 1963)
- Biggest defeat: 3-6 Vs Coventry City (30 November 1963)
Home colours	Away colours

During the 1963–64 English Third Division football season, Queens Park Rangers returned from the White City stadium to Loftus Road and finished in Fifteenth place. In september Frank Sibley, 15-year-old right winger made his debut.New high-powered floodlights were installed at Loftus Road at the end of the season. They cost about £13,000 to £15,000. In May, came a sign of things to come as QPR's youth team won the South East Counties League title.

== League standings ==
Pos	Team	Pld	W	D	L	GF	GA	GAv	Pts
13	Port Vale	46	16	14	16	53	49	1.082	46
14	Southend United	46	15	15	16	77	78	0.987	45
15	Queens Park Rangers	46	18	9	19	76	78	0.974	45
16	Brentford	46	15	14	17	87	80	1.088	44
17	Colchester United	46	12	19	15	70	68	1.029	43

== Results ==
QPR scores given first

Win Draw Loss

=== Third Division ===
Date	Opponents	Venue	Result F–A	Scorers	Attendance	Position
24 August 1963	Oldham Athletic	A	1-2	Graham	13029	16
26 August 1963	Shrewsbury	A	2-1	Bedford 2	8051	7
31 August 1963	Peterborough	H	3-0	Leary 2, Angell (pen)	10762	6
7 September 1963	Southend	A	3-1	Lazarus 2, Leary	14069	4
9 September 1963	Shrewsbury	H	3-4	Graham 2, Bedford	11090	7
14 September 1963	Watford	H	1-0	Bedford	10829	3
17 September 1963	Bristol Rovers	A	0-0		12328	3
21 September 1963	Colchester	A	0-2		5418	8
28 September 1963	Millwall	H	2-0	Bedford, McQuade	9859	6
30 September 1963	Bristol Rovers	H	1-0	Lazarus	8793	4
4 October 1963	Barnsley	A	1-3	Bedford	5791	6
7 October 1963	Bournemouth and Boscombe Athletic	H	1-0	Angell (pen)	10045	4
12 October 1963	Mansfield Town	A	0-1		10869	8
16 October 1963	Bournemouth and Boscombe Athletic	A	2-4	Collins, Vafiadis	8915	11
19 October 1963	Notts County	H	3-2	Collins, Lazarus. Bircumshaw (og)	7175	11
21 October 1963	Hull City	H	0-2		9836	11
26 October 1963	Crewe Alexandra	A	0-2		5114	15
30 October 1963	Hull City	A	0-3		7932	17
2 November 1963	Crystal Palace	H	3-4	Collins 2, Bedford	9826	18
9 November 1963	Walsall	A	2-0	Lazarus, Graham	7961	17
23 November 1963	Luton Town	A	4-4	Leary 2, Graham, McQuade	6598	15
30 November 1963	Coventry City	H	3-6	Bedford 2, Keen	10997	17
14 December 1963	Oldham Athletic	H	3-2	Bedford 2, Leary	5265	17
21 December 1963	Peterborough	A	1-2	Angell (pen)	6418	17
26-Dec-1963	Bristol City	A	PP			
28 December 1963	Bristol City	H	0-2		6916	17
4-Jan-1964	Reading	H	PP			
11 January 1964	Southend	H	4-5	Bedford, Vafiadis, Leary 2	4380	18
18 January 1964	Watford	A	1-3	Graham	11550	19
25-Jan-1964	Port Vale	A	PP			
1 February 1964	Colchester	H	0-0		5225	19
8 February 1964	Millwall	A	2-2	McLeod, Leary	11154	19
15-Feb-1964	Barnsley	H	PP			
22 February 1964	Mansfield Town	H	2-0	Humble (og), Bedford	4780	19
29 February 1964	Brentford	A	2-2	Bedford 2	12226	19
7 March 1964	Crewe Alexandra	H	2-0	Graham, Riggs (og)	3676	18
10 March 1964	Bristol City	A	1-2	McLeod	8869	18
14 March 1964	Crystal Palace	A	0-1		15370	18
20 March 1964	Brentford	H	2-2	Bedford 2	9351	18
27 March 1964	Wrexham	H	1-0	Collins	7867	18
28 March 1964	Reading	A	2-1	McLeod 2	7947	17
30 March 1964	Wrexham	A	1-0	Collins	7885	16
4-Apr-64	Luton Town	H	PP			
6 April 1964	Port Vale	A	0-2		7167	17
11 April 1964	Coventry City	A	2-4	Collins 2	27384	18
14 April 1964	Reading	H	4-2	Leary, Bedford, Keen, Vafiadis	5542	17
18 April 1964	Port Vale	H	3-0	Bedford 2, Leary	4955	17
20 April	Walsall	H	PP (due to fire at Battersea Power Station)			
25 April 1964	Notts County	A	2-2	Vafiadis, Leary	2862	17
27 April 1964	Barnsley	H	2-2	Bedford 2	8434	17
29 April 1964	Luton Town	H	1-1	Bedford	5005	17
1 May 1964	Walsall	H	3-0	Keen 2 (1 pen), Collins	5625	15

=== London Challenge Cup ===
Date	Round	Opponents	H / A	Result F–A	Scorers	Attendance
9 October 1963	First Round	Fulham	H	0-1		

=== Football League Cup ===
Date	Round	Opponents	H / A	Result F–A	Scorers	Attendance
4 September 1963	First Round	Aldershot (Fourth Division)	A	1-3	Bedford	6800

=== FA Cup ===
Date	Round	Opponents	H / A	Result F–A	Scorers	Attendance
16 November 1963	First Round	Gillingham (Fourth Division)	H	4-1	Leary, Malcolm, Graham, Bedford	12141
7 December 1963	Second Round	Colchester United (Third Division)	A	1-0	Leary 70'	6841
4 January 1964	Third Round	Carlisle United (Fourth Division)	A	0-2		15359

== Friendly Matches ==
Date	Opponents	Result
13-Aug-63	Brentford v Queens Park Rangers	
19-Aug-63	Queens Park Rangers v Brentford	
25-Sep-63	Romford v Queens Park Rangers	
15-Feb-64	Queens Park Rangers v Hibernians	5-1

== Squad ==
Position	Nationality	Name	League Appearances	League Goals	Cup Appearances	League.Cup Goals	F.A.Cup Goals	Total Appearances	Total Goals
GK	(England)	Peter Springett	26		4			30	
GK	(England)	Frank Smith	20					20	
DF	(Republic of Ireland)	Ray Brady	44		4			48	
DF	(Republic of Ireland)	Pat Brady	18		1			19	
DF	(Republic of Ireland)	Dick Whittaker	17		1			18	
DF	(England)	Frank Sibley	3		1			4	
DF	(England)	Brian Taylor	9					9	
MF	(England)	Terry McQuade	20	2	4			24	2
MF	(England)	Mike Keen	46	4	4			50	4
MF	(England)	Mark Lazarus	23	5	3			26	5
MF	(England)	John Collins	35	9	1			36	9
MF	(England)	Peter Angell	39	3	4			42	3
MF	(England)	Andy Malcolm	31		4	1		35	1
FW	(South Africa)	Stuart Leary	43	12	4	2		47	14
FW	(Wales)	Brian Bedford	44	23	3	1	1	47	25
FW	(Northern Ireland)	Seth Vafiadis	15	4				19	4
FW	(Northern Ireland)	Malcolm Graham	21	7	2	1		23	8
FW	(England)	Derek Gibbs	28		2			30	
FW	(Scotland)	George McLeod	17	4	4			21	4

== Transfers In ==
Name	from	Date	Fee
Malcolm Graham	Orient	July 1963	
Ray Brady	Millwall	July 1963	
Pat Brady	Millwall	July 1963	
Dick Whittaker	Peterborough United	July 1963	
Terry McQuade	Millwall	July 1963	
Peter Morgan		July ?1963	
Barry Baker *		July ?1963	
Derek Gibbs	Leyton Orient	July 1963	£5,000
Keith Elliott *		July ?1963	
Peter Phillips *	Hendon	November 1963	
George McLeod	Brentford	January 1964	Plus £8,000 in exchange for Mark Lazarus
George Jacks	Queens Park Rangers Juniors	January 1964	
Robin Lumley *	Chesham U	February 1964	
Bobby Nash	Queens Park Rangers Juniors	February 1964	
Mick Leach	Queens Park Rangers Juniors	February 21, 1964	
Larry Pritchard *	Walton & Hersham	February 1964	
Peter Keary *	Walton & Hersham	March 1964	

== Transfers Out ==
Name	from	Date	Fee	Date	Club	Fee
Ray Drinkwater	Portsmouth	February 28, 1958		July 1963	Bath City.	
Peter Baker	Sheffield Wednesday	March 1961		July 1963	Romford	
Roy Bentley	Fulham	June 1961		July 1963	Reading (manager)	
Mike Barber	Arsenal	November 30, 1959		July 1963	Notts County	£11,000
Sylvan Anderton	Chelsea	January 19, 1962	£5,000	July 1963	Dover	£3,000
Jimmy Dugdale	Aston Villa	October 17, 1962	£6,000	October 1963	Retired (Injury)	
Mark Lazarus	Wolverhampton Wanderers	February 23, 1962	£16,000	January 1964	Brentford	George McLeod Plus £8,000
Peter Phillips *	Hendon	November 1963		January 1964	Hendon	
Robin Lumley *	Chesham U	February 1964		March? 1964		
Larry Pritchard *	Walton & Hersham	February 1964		April? 1964		
Peter Keary *	Walton & Hersham	March 1964		May? 1964		
Barry Baker *		July ?1963		June? 1964	Wycombe	Free
Keith Elliott *		July ?1963		June? 1964	Hayes	Free
