= 1964–65 Queens Park Rangers F.C. season =

English football club season

Queens Park Rangers
1964–65 season
- Chairman: Bernard Baker, Jim Gregory
- Manager: Alec Stock
- Stadium: Loftus Road
- Football League Third Division: 14th
- FA Cup: Second Round
- Football League Cup: Second Round
- London Challenge Cup: Quarter finalist
- Southern Junior Floodlight Cup.: Joint Winners
- Top goalscorer: League: Brian Bedford 23; All: Brian Bedford 26
- Highest home attendance: 11,063 Vs Brentford 9 October 1964
- Lowest home attendance: 3,260 Vs Oldham Athletic 19 April 1965
- Average home league attendance: 5,713
- Biggest win: 7–1 Vs Luton Town (6 November 1964)
- Biggest defeat: 1–8 Vs Mansfield Town (15 March 1965)
Home colours	Away colours

During the 1964–65 English football season, Queens Park Rangers competed in the Third Division and despite an outstanding 4th best home record, QPR finished in Fourteenth place – largely due to only 2 away wins all season . In November Jim Gregory who had earlier turned down Fulham joined the QPR Board and became Chairman 5 months later. An unsuccessful attempt was made in January to sign 29 goal torquay forward Robin Stubbs with a £5,000 plus player exchange bid. In April, there was a sign of things to come as QPR's youth team were joint winners with Tottenham of the Southern Junior Floodlight Cup.

== League standings ==
Pos	Team	Pld	W	D	L	GF	GA	GAv	Pts
12	Southend United	46	19	8	19	78	71	1.099	46
13	Reading	46	16	14	16	70	70	1.000	46
14	Queens Park Rangers	46	17	12	17	72	80	0.900	46
15	Workington	46	17	12	17	58	69	0.841	46
16	Shrewsbury Town	46	15	12	19	76	84	0.905	42

== Results ==
QPR scores given first

Win Draw Loss

=== Third Division ===
Date	Opponents	Venue	Result F–A	Scorers	Attendance	Position
22 August 1964	Barnsley	A	0–0		5,688	14
24 August 1964	Southend	H	2–0	Leary, Bedford	6,709	2
28 August 1964	Scunthorpe United	H	2–1	Keen 2	6,764	1
31 August 1964	Southend	A	0–0		10,862	1
5 September 1964	Walsall	A	1–4	Collins	4,190	9
7 September 1964	Reading	H	0–1		7,233	13
11 September 1964	Watford	H	2–2	Leary, Bedford	8.833	13
16 September 1964	Reading	A	3–5	Keen 2, Bedford	10,422	14
18 September 1964	Workington	A	0–0		7,394	16
25 September 1964	Hull City	H	2–1	McAdams, Keen	6,639	12
3 October 1964	Gillingham	A	2–2	Keen, Bedford	12,581	13
5 October 1964	Shrewsbury	H	2–1	Bedford, Morgan R	5,772	12
9 October 1964	Brentford	H	1–3	Keen	11,063	16
13 October 1964	Bristol City	A	0–2		11,133	17
17 October 1964	Colchester	A	2–1	Collins, OG	3,529	16
19 October 1964	Bristol City	H	1–0	Bedford	5,560	14
23 October 1964	Port Vale	H	3–1	Morgan I, Morgan R, Bedford	4,489	14
30 October 1964	Carlisle United	A	0–2		9,483	14
6 November 1964	Luton Town	H	7–1	Keen 3, Morgan R, Bedford 3	5,175	14
21 November 1964	Grimsby Town	H	1–1	Morgan R	6,213	13
28 November 1964	Peterborough	A	1–6	Collins	8,337	14
11 December 1964	Barnsley	H	3–2	Bedford 3	3,350	14
18 December 1964	Scunthorpe United	A	1–2	McAdams	5,344	16
26 December 1964	Bristol Rovers	A	1–3	Morgan R	17,698	16
28 December 1964	Bristol Rovers	H	3–1	Keen, Bedford 2	5,220	16
1 January 1965	Walsall	H	1–0	Bedford	4,844	10
16 January 1965	Watford	A	2–0	Morgan I, Leary	7,526	11
29 January 1965	AFC Bournemouth	H	1–1	Bedford	3,520	12
6 February 1965	Hull City	A	1–3	McAdams	23,574	14
13 February 1965	Gillingham	H	3–1	Collins, McAdams, Bedford	6,633	11
20 February 1965	Brentford	A	2–5	Keen, Morgan I	12,398	13
26 February 1965	Colchester	H	5–0	McAdams 3, Leach, Bedford	4,220	12
6 March 1965	AFC Bournemouth	A	0–2		5,937	13
12 March 1965	Carlisle United	H	1–2	Bedford	5,834	15
15 March 1965	Mansfield Town	A	1–8	Bedford	9.168	17
20 March 1965	Luton Town	A	0–2		3,998	16
26 March 1965	Mansfield Town	H	2–0	Bedford, Collins	5,400	16
31 March 1965	Exeter City	A	2–2	Leary 2	5,615	14
3 April 1965	Grimsby Town	A	0–0		4,207	13
5 April 1965	Workington	H	2–1	Hazell, Leary	4,642	11
10 April 1965	Peterborough	H	3–2	Leary, Bedford, Collins	4,972	11
12 April 1965	Shrewsbury	A	2–3	McAdams, Morgan I	3,415	11
16 April 1965	Oldham Athletic	A	3–5	Collins 2, Keen	7,951	11
17 April 1965	Port Vale	A	0–0		4,816	11
19 April 1965	Oldham Athletic	H	1–1	Leary	3,260	11
23 April 1965	Exeter City	H	0–0		4,060	14

=== London Challenge Cup ===
Date	Round	Opponents	H / A	Result F–A	Scorers	Attendance
5 October 1964	First Round	Tooting & Mitcham United	A	3–1		
19 October 1955	Quarter-Finals	Orient	A	0–2		

=== Football League Cup ===
Date	Round	Opponents	H / A	Result F–A	Scorers	Attendance
2 September 1964	First Round	Aldershot (Fourth Division)	H	5–2	Bedford, Collins 3, Angell	3,528
23 September 1964	Second Round	Reading (Third Division)	A	0–4		7,271

=== FA Cup ===
Date	Round	Opponents	H / A	Result F–A	Scorers	Attendance
4 December 1964	First Round	Bath City (Southern Football League Premier Division)	H	2–0	Leary, Collins	7,398
22 January 1965	Second Round	Peterborough (Third Division)	H	3–3	Keen, Brady R, Bedford	6,502
26 January 1965	Second Round Replay	Peterborough (Third Division)	A	1–2	McAdams	15,298

== Squad ==
Position	Nationality	Name	League Appearances	League Goals	Cup Appearances	F.A.Cup Goals	League Cup Goals	Total Appearances	Total Goals
GK	(England)	Peter Springett	21		1			22	
GK	(England)	Frank Smith	25		3			29	
DF	(Republic of Ireland)	Ray Brady	44		5	1		49	1
DF	(Republic of Ireland)	Pat Brady	33		4			37	
DF	(England)	Bobby Nash	17		1			18	
DF	(England)	Tony Hazell	29	1	3			32	1
DF	(England)	Ron Hunt	10					10	
DF	(England)	Frank Sibley	6		1			7	
DF	(England)	Brian Taylor	22		2			24	
MF	(England)	Terry McQuade			1			1	
MF	(England)	Mick Leach	5	1				5	1
MF	(England)	Mike Keen	46	13	5	1		51	14
MF	(England)	Roger Morgan	27	5	3			30	5
MF	(England)	John Collins	40	8	5	3		45	11
MF	(England)	Peter Angell	9		3	1		12	1
MF	(England)	George Jacks	1					1	
MF	(England)	Andy Malcolm	22		3			25	
FW	(South Africa)	Stuart Leary	26	8	5	1		31	9
FW	(Wales)	Brian Bedford	40	23	5	3		45	26
FW	(Northern Ireland)	Billy McAdams	27	8	1	1		28	9
FW	(England)	Derek Gibbs	2					2	
FW	(Scotland)	George McLeod	24		1			25	
FW	(England)	Ian Morgan	30	4	2			32	4

== Transfers In ==
Name	from	Date	Fee
Roger Morgan	Queens Park Rangers Juniors	September 1964	
Ian Morgan	Queens Park Rangers Juniors	September 1964	
Billy McAdams	Brentford	September 22, 1964	£5,000
Tony Hazell	Queens Park Rangers Juniors	October 12, 1964	
Gordon Gale		October 12, 1964	
John Blake		December 1, 1964	
Frank Sibley		December 7, 1964	
Colin Parker		March 1965	
Alan Wilks	Fulham	May 1965	Free
Keith Sanderson	Plymouth	June 1965	£4,000

== Transfers Out ==
Name	from	Date	Fee	Date	Club	Fee
Peter Morgan		July ?1963		July? 1964	Bedford Town	
Malcolm Graham	Orient	July 1963	£5,000	July 1964	Barnsley	
Dick Whittaker	Peterborough United	July 1963		July 1964	Stamford (player-manager)	
Seth Vafiadis	Chelsea	November 1962		September 1964	Millwall	
Terry McQuade	Millwall	July 1963		February 1965	Dover	Free
Gordon Gale		October 12, 1964		June? 1965		
