= 1962–63 Queens Park Rangers F.C. season =

English football club season

Queens Park Rangers
1962-63 season
- Chairman: Albert Hittinger
- Manager: Alec Stock
- Stadium: Loftus Road & White City Stadium (from November 1962)
- Football League Third Division: 13th
- FA Cup: Third Round
- Football League Cup: Second Round
- London Challenge Cup: First Round
- Top goalscorer: League: Brian Bedford 23; All: Brian Bedford 26
- Highest home attendance: 18,281 v Hull City (22 October 1962)
- Lowest home attendance: 3,261 v Coventry City (22 May 1963)
- Average home league attendance: 9,979
- Biggest win: 7-2 v Hinckley Athletic (24 Nov 1962)
- Biggest defeat: 0-5 v Swindon Town (2 January 1963)
Home colours	Away colours

The 1962-63 Queens Park Rangers season was the club's 72nd season of existence and their 11th back in the Football League Third Division following their relegation in the 1951–52 season. QPR finished 13th in their league campaign, and were eliminated in the third round of the FA Cup.

== Season summary ==
QPR experimented once again with a move to White City Stadium, but returned to Loftus Road the following season.

On the last game of the season Club stalwart Tony Ingham made his 548th and final QPR appearance.

== League standings ==
Pos	Team	Pld	W	D	L	GF	GA	GAv	Pts
11	Crystal Palace	46	17	13	16	68	58	1.172	47
12	Colchester United	46	18	11	17	73	93	0.785	47
13	Queens Park Rangers	46	17	11	18	85	76	1.118	45
14	Bristol City	46	16	13	17	100	92	1.087	45
15	Shrewsbury Town	46	16	12	18	83	81	1.025	44

== Results ==
QPR scores given first

Win Draw Loss

=== Third Division ===
Date	Opponents	Venue	Result F–A	Scorers	Attendance	Position
18 August 1962	Brighton & Hove Albion	H	2-2	Lazarus, Bedford	12,022	10
20 August 1962	Halifax Town	H	5-0	Bedford 2, McClelland, Keen, Lazarus	11,143	1
24 August 1962	Carlisle United	A	5-2	Lazarus 2 (1 pen), Bedford 2, Evans	8,116	1
27 August 1962	Halifax Town	A	4-1	McClelland, Angell (pen), Bedford, Lazarus	7,353	1
1 September 1962	Swindon Town	H	2-2	McClelland (32'), Large (34')	12,573	1
3 September 1962	Crystal Palace	H	4-1	Bedford 2, Angell (pen), Large	16,853	1
8 September 1962	Peterborough United	A	2-1	McClelland, Bedford	14,481	1
12 September 1962	Crystal Palace	A	0-1		21,958	1
15 September 1962	Barnsley	H	2-1	Large 2	11,246	1
17 September 1962	Wrexham	H	1-2	Lazarus	13,175	1
22 September 1962	Northampton Town	A	0-1		15,469	3
29 September 1962	Southend United	A	3-1	McClelland, Barber, Lazarus	12,597	3
1-Oct-62	Hull City	H	Abandoned			
6 October 1962	Notts. County	H	0-1		15,594	7
10 October 1962	Wrexham	A	1-3	Lazarus	15,417	9
13 October 1962	Bournemouth & Boscombe Ath.	A	1-2	Bedford	11,678	11
20 October 1962	Coventry City	H	PP			
22 October 1962	Hull City	C	4-1	Bedford 3, Lazarus	18,281	7
27 October 1962	Bradford Park Avenue	A	3-0	McClelland 3	8,552	5
10 November 1962	Bristol City	A	4-2	Bedford 2, Barber, McClelland	13,262	5
17 November 1962	Reading	H	3-2	Large, Collins, Malcolm	10,313	5
1 December 1962	Shrewsbury Town	H	0-0		10,347	5
8 December 1962	Millwall	A	0-0		13,763	6
15 December 1962	Brighton & Hove Albion	A	2-2	Bedford, Lazarus	11,529	7
22 December 1962	Carlisle United	H	2-2	Lazarus 2	9,733	4
26-Dec-62	Colchester United	A	PP			
29 December 1962	Colchester United	H	PP			
5 January 1963	Port Vale	A	PP			
12 January 1963	Swindon Town	A	0-5		7,625	8
19 January 1963	Peterborough United	H	PP			
26 January 1963	Watford	H	PP			
2 February 1963	Barnsley	A	PP			
9 February 1963	Northampton Town	H	1-3	Bedford	14,238	9
16 February 1963	Southend United	H	PP			
23 February 1963	Notts. County	A	2-3	Lazarus, Bedford	8,268	10
2 March 1963	Bournemouth & Boscombe Ath.	H	1-0	Bedford	8,393	8
9 March 1963	Coventry City	A	1-4	Leary	15,029	11
16 March 1963	Bradford Park Avenue	H	1-2	Malcolm	7,355	12
23 March 1963	Watford	A	5-2	Lazarus 2 (1 pen), Bedford 2, Malcolm	10,597	12
30 March 1963	Bristol City	H	3-1	Collins, Leary, Barber	5,716	10
1 April 1963	Colchester United	H	1-2	Malcolm	7,688	10
5 April 1963	Reading	A	1-1	Bedford	7,946	11
8 April 1963	Southend United	H	1-0	Lazarus	7,552	8
12 April 1963	Bristol Rovers	H	3-5	Bedford, Leary, Lazarus	10,169	10
13 April 1963	Port Vale	H	3-1	Leary 2, Collins	5,690	8
15 April 1963	Bristol Rovers	A	0-0		10,954	7
20 April 1963	Shrewsbury Town	A	3-0	Lazarus, Malcolm, Leary	3,890	6
22 April 1963	Colchester United	A	1-2	McClelland	6,556	7
25 April 1963	Hull City	A	1-4	Leary	5,894	9
27 April 1963	Millwall	H	2-3	Leary, McClelland	8,583	10
29 April 1963	Port Vale	A	2-3	Leary, Sproson (og)	5,974	11
10 May 1963	Barnsley	A	0-0		4,934	12
13 May 1963	Watford	H	2-2	Barber, Collins	5,052	12
18 May 1963	Peterborough United	H	0-0		5,977	12
22 May 1963	Coventry City	H	1-3	Collins	3,261	13

=== London Challenge Cup ===
Date	Round	Opponents	H / A	Result F–A	Scorers	Attendance
26 September 1962	First Round	West Ham United	H	3-3		
2 October 1962	First Round Replay	West Ham United	A	1-7		

=== Football League Cup ===
Date	Round	Opponents	H / A	Result F–A	Scorers	Attendance
24 Sep 1962	First Round	Preston North End (Second Division)	H	1-2	Collins	11005

=== FA Cup ===
Date	Round	Opponents	H / A	Result F–A	Scorers	Attendance
03 Nov 1962	First Round	Newport County (Fourth Division)	H	3-2	Barber 2, Large	12252
24 Nov 1962	Second Round	Hinckley Athletic (Southern Football League Division One)	H	7-2	Bedford 3, McClelland, Collins, Lazarus, Large	13008
5-Jan-63	Third Round	Swansea Town (Second Division)	A	pp		
26 Jan 1963	Third Round	Swansea Town (Second Division)	A	0-2		12500

== Friendlies ==
Date	Opponents		Score
8-Aug-62	Brentford v Queens Park Rangers	Friendly	
10-Aug-62	Aldershot v Queens Park Rangers	Friendly	
13-Aug-62	Queens Park Rangers v Brentford	Friendly	
29-Oct-62	Queens Park Rangers v Football League XI	Private	
19-Nov-62	Queens Park Rangers v England XI	Private	

== Squad ==
Position	Nationality	Name	League Appearances	League Goals	Cup Appearances	League.Cup Goals	F.A.Cup Goals	Total Appearances	Total Goals
GK	(England)	Ray Drinkwater	27		3			30	
GK	(England)	Frank Smith	17		1			18	
GK	(England)	Peter Springett	2					2	
DF	(England)	Tony Ingham	41		3			44	
DF	(England)	Keith Rutter	17		1			18	
DF	(England)	Roy Bentley	16		2			18	
DF	(England)	Peter Baker	6					6	
DF	(England)	Brian Taylor	14					14	
MF	(England)	John McClelland	33	11	4	1		37	12
MF	(England)	Jimmy Dugdale	10		3			13	
MF	(England)	Mike Keen	41	1	2			43	1
MF	(England)	Mark Lazarus	42	18	4	1		46	19
MF	(England)	Bill Williams	25		1			26	
MF	(England)	John Collins	33	5	3	1	1	36	7
MF	(England)	Peter Angell	30	2	4			34	2
MF	(England)	Andy Malcolm	31	6	3			34	6
FW	(South Africa)	Stuart Leary	24	9	1			25	9
FW	(England)	Mike Barber	28	4	1	2		29	6
FW	(England)	Frank Large	18	4	4	2		22	6
FW	(Wales)	Brian Bedford	43	23	3	3		46	26
FW	(England)	Bernard Evans	8	1	1			9	1

== Transfers In ==
Name	from	Date	Fee
David Johnston	Reading	September 1962	
Andy Malcolm	Chelsea	17 October 1962	£12,000
Jimmy Dugdale	Aston Villa	17 October 1962	£6,000
Seth Vafiadis	Chelsea	November 1962	
Stuart Leary	Charlton	15 December 1962	£17,000
Don Whyte *	Hertford Town	March 1963	
Ron Hunt	Queens Park Rangers Juniors	May 1963	
Peter Springett		May 1963	

== Transfers Out ==
Name	from	Date	Fee	Date	Club	Fee
David Cockell	Hounslow Town	23 August 1960	£100	July 1962	Kettering Town	
George Bristow	Brentford	May 1961		July? 62	Yiewsley	
David Cockell	Hounslow Town	August 1960		July 1962	Crawley Town	
Rodney Slack	Leicester	14 March 1961	£250	July 1962	Cambridge U	
Jim Towers	Brentford	May 1961	£8,000*	August 1962	Millwall	£5,000
Bill Smith		July 1961		September? 1962		
Bernard Evans	Wrexham	November 1960	£2,000	December 1962	Oxford	£5,000
Roy Bentley	Fulham	June 1961	Free	Jan 1963	Reading (manager)	
Keith Rutter	Methley U	1 July 1954		Feb 1963	Colchester	£3,000
Frank Large	Halifax Town	June 1962		March 1963	Northampton Town	£8,500
Jimmy Dugdale	Aston Villa	October 1962		May 1963	Retired (injury)	
Don Whyte *	Hertford Town	March 1963		May? 1963		
David Johnston	Reading	September 1962		May 1963		Free
John McClelland	Lincoln	23 September 1961	£15,000	May 1963	Portsmouth	£10,000
Peter Hobbs		December 1961		May 1963	Watford	Free
Jimmy Andrews	Leyton Orient	June 1959		June 1963	Retired (QPR coach)	
Tony Ingham	Leeds	12 June 1950	£5,000	June 1963	Retired (QPR comm.manager)	
Bill Williams	Portsmouth	June 1961		June 1963	West Bromwich	£10,000
