= Terry Matthews (footballer) =

English footballer (1936–2026)

Personal information
- Full name: George Terence Leonard Matthews
- Date of birth: 25 February 1936
- Place of birth: Leyton, England
- Date of death: August 2026 (aged 90)
- Position: Inside forward

Youth career
- Tufnell Park
- Edmonton
- Queens United
- West Ham United

Senior career*
Years	Team	Apps	(Gls)
1952–1957	West Ham United	9	(1)
1957–1962	Aldershot	62	(20)
1962–1963	Gillingham	10	(1)
1963	Ashford Town	13	(0)

Managerial career
- ?–1974: Aveley
- 1974–1977: Tilbury
- 1977–?: Walthamstow Avenue
- * Club domestic league appearances and goals

George Terence Leonard Matthews (25 February 1936 – August 2026) was an English footballer who played as an inside-forward in the Football League for West Ham United, Aldershot and Gillingham. He later managed non-League clubs Aveley, Tilbury and Walthamstow Avenue.

== Career ==
Matthews played for Hackney and Middlesex Schools and joined West Ham United as a youth. He signed professional forms with the east London club in August 1952. He made his senior debut on 22 October 1953, a 5–1 defeat against Colchester United in the Essex Professional Cup, alongside fellow debutants Andy Malcolm and Fred Cooper.

He would have to wait 2 1/2 years for his league debut, a Second Division encounter against Blackburn Rovers on 17 March 1956. He scored the only West Ham goal of a 4–1 defeat.

After nine league appearances for West Ham, his final game for the club came in the Essex Professional Cup, in a 3–1 win over Chelmsford City on 26 November 1956.

Matthews joined Aldershot in July 1957 and scored 20 goals in 62 appearances, before moving to Gillingham in August 1962. He scored one goal in 12 appearances for the Gills during the 1962–63 season.

He then moved to non-league Ashford Town where he was captain before injury curtailed his playing career. He went on to manage Aveley, and in 1974 moved to Tilbury, with Larry Hutson making a move in the opposite direction. At the end of the 1976–77 season, Matthews left for Walthamstow Avenue.

Matthews later managed Sunday league team Ockendon Motor Spares.

== Death ==
Matthews died in August 2026, aged 90.
