= 1958–59 West Ham United F.C. season =

English football team season

After winning the Second Division title the previous season, West Ham United equalled their highest ever league finish of the 1926–1927 season, coming a very respectable 6th. This was in spite of the fact that the only signing they made was of the Leyton Orient inside forward Phil Woosnam in November 1958.

== Season summary ==
West Ham beat the champions of that season (and the previous one) Wolverhampton Wanderers 2–0 in their first home match back in the top flight.

The team featured Andy Malcolm who was West Ham's first ever England youth international. This indicated the progress manager Ted Fenton had made in establishing West Ham's successful academy.

== League table ==
Pos	Team	Pld	W	D	L	GF	GA	GAv	Pts
4	Bolton Wanderers	42	20	10	12	79	66	1.197	50
5	West Bromwich Albion	42	18	13	11	88	68	1.294	49
6	West Ham United	42	21	6	15	85	70	1.214	48
7	Burnley	42	19	10	13	81	70	1.157	48
8	Blackpool	42	18	11	13	66	49	1.347	47

Source: World Football
Rules for classification: 1) Points; 2) Goal average; 3) Goals scored

== Squad ==
No.		Player	Position	Lge Apps	Lge Gls	FAC Apps	FAC Gls	Total Apps	Total Gls	Date signed	Previous club
West Ham United F.C. 1958–1959 First XI (Most appearances)
1	(England)	Ernie Gregory	GK	32		1		33		1939	Leytonstone
2	(England)	John Bond	RB	42	7	1		43	7	1951	Amateur
3	(Republic of Ireland)	Noel Cantwell (Captain)	LB	42	3	1		43	3	1952	Cork United F.C.
4	(England)	Andy Malcolm	RH	42		1		43		1950	Academy
5	(England)	Ken Brown (Hammer of the Year)	CH	42		1		43		1952	Academy
6	(England)	John Smith	LH	36	4	1		37	4	1956	Academy
7	(England)	Mike Grice	OR	42	6	1		43	6	1955	Colchester United
8	(Wales)	Phil Woosnam	IR	13	2			13	2	November 1958	Leyton Orient
9	(England)	Vic Keeble	CF	32	20	1		33	20	1957	Newcastle United
10	(Scotland)	John Dick	IL	41	27	1		42	27	1953	Crittall Athletic
11	(England)	Malcolm Musgrove	OL	40	7	1		41	7	1953	Lynmouth Colliery
Other players with appearances
6	(England)	Andy Nelson	LH	12	1			12	1	1957	Academy
2	(England)	Joe Kirkup	RB	11				11		1958	Academy
1	(England)	Noel Dwyer	GK	10				10		1958	Wolves
6	(England)	Bill Lansdowne	LH	6	1			6	1	1955	Woodford Town
8	(England)	Harry Obeney	IR	6	3			6	3	1956	Briggs Sports
6	(England)	Bobby Moore	LH	5				5		1958	Academy
8	(England)	Andy Smillie	IR	4		1		5		1958	Academy
9	(England)	Billy Dare	CF	2	1			2	1	1954	Brentford
8	(England)	Doug Wragg	OR	2				2		1956	Academy
