= Foan =

Foan is an English surname. Notable people with this surname include:

- Albert Foan (1923–2009), English football player
- Gilbert Foan (1887–1935), British hairdresser and politician

The name Foan comes from the French/Middle English term faun which is a young animal/cub/deer. The name first originated in the late 12th century.
