= 1960–61 Queens Park Rangers F.C. season =

English football club season

Queens Park Rangers
1960–61 season
- Chairman: Albert Hittinger
- Manager: Alec Stock
- Stadium: Loftus Road
- Football League Third Division: 3rd
- FA Cup: Second Round
- Football League Cup: First Round
- London Challenge Cup: Quarter-Finals
- Top goalscorer: League: Brian Bedford 33; All: Brian Bedford 37
- Highest home attendance: 14,672 v Bury (28 January 1961)
- Lowest home attendance: 5,373 v Walthamstow Avenue (5 Nov 1960)
- Biggest win: 9–2 v Tranmere (3 December 1960)
- Biggest defeat: 1–4 v Shrewsbury Town (8 April 1961)
Home colours	Away colours

The 1960–61 Queens Park Rangers season was the club's 70th season of existence and their 9th back in the Football League Third Division following their relegation in the 1951–52 season. QPR finished 3rd in their league campaign, missing promotion back to the second division by two points. QPR were eliminated in the second round of the FA Cup.

In the season, QPR reverted to blue and white hooped shirts. In December, QPR embarked on an 11-game unbeaten run. The run started with QPR's biggest win over the season, in a 9–2 victory with Tranmere Rovers on the 3rd.

Winger Clive Clark moved to first division West Bromwich Albion for a fee of £17,000 in January 1961.

== League standings ==
Pos	Team	Pld	W	D	L	GF	GA	GAv	Pts	Promotion or relegation
1	Bury (C, P)	46	30	8	8	108	45	2.400	68	Promotion to the Second Division
2	Walsall (P)	46	28	6	12	98	60	1.633	62	Promotion to the Second Division
3	Queens Park Rangers	46	25	10	11	93	60	1.550	60	
4	Watford	46	20	12	14	85	72	1.181	52	
5	Notts County	46	21	9	16	82	77	1.065	51	

(C) Champions; (P) Promoted

== Results ==
QPR scores given first

Win Draw Loss

=== Third Division ===
Date	Opponents	Venue	Result F–A	Scorers	Attendance	Position
20 August 1960	Bournemouth & Boscombe Ath. (-)	A	0–1		12222	20
25 August 1960	Notts County (12)	A	1–2	Andrews	15174	24
27 August 1960	Bradford City (13)	H	1–0	Bedford	7075	16
29 August 1960	Notts County (3)	H	2–0	Clark 2	8165	7
3 September 1960	Barnsley (8)	A	3–3	Bedford, Whitfield 2	6162	14
5 September 1960	Coventry City (19)	A	4–4	Bedford 2, Andrews, Clark	15,804	10
10 September 1960	Newport County (8)	H	2–0	Whitfield, Barber	7353	8
12 September 1960	Coventry City (21)	H	2–1	Bedford, Woods (pen)	9199	4
17 September 1960	Colchester United (10)	A	1–0	Lazarus	5750	2
19 September 1960	Brentford (17)	H	0–0		12823	5
24 September 1960	Grimsby Town (1)	H	2–0	Andrews, Longbottom	11042	3
27 September 1960	Brentford (17)	A	0–2		15282	6
1 October 1960	Hull City (9)	A	1–3	Bedford	9333	8
3 October 1960	Reading (19)	H	5–2	Bedford 2, Lazarus 2, Barber	8426	6
8 October 1960	Torquay	H	3–3	Bedford, Lazarus 2	7901	8
15 October 1960	Port Vale (13)	A	1–0	Bedford	8802	5
22 October 1960	Southend (17)	H	2–1	Woods (pen), Bedford	6122	3
29 October 1960	Chesterfield	A	1–0	Carey	4474	3
12 November 1960	Walsall (6)	A	3–4	Bedford 2, Lazarus	10044	4
19 November 1960	Shrewsbury (18)	H	1–1	Bedford	7680	4
3 December 1960	Tranmere Rovers (22)	H	9–2	Evans 2, Bedford 2, Clark 2, Lazarus 2, Andrews	4921	3
10 December 1960	Watford (8)	A	3–0	Lazarus, Woods (pen), Clark	15546	3
17 December 1960	Bournemouth & Boscombe Ath. (14)	H	3–1	Bedford 2, Evans	6952	3
26 December 1960	Bristol City (16)	A	1–1	Bedford	10794	3
27 December 1960	Bristol City (18)	H	1–1	Woods (pen)	15391	3
31 December 1960	Bradford City (22)	A	1–1	Evans	8405	3
7 January 1961	Halifax Town	A				
14 January 1961	Barnsley (9)	H	4–2	Evans, Keen, Bedford, Andrews	8859	2
23 January 1961	Newport County (10)	A	3–1	Evans 2, Bedford	6610	1
28 January 1961	Bury	H	3–1	Bedford 3	14672	1
4 February 1961	Colchester United (22)	H	3–2	Evans, Bedford, Lazarus	10348	1
11 February 1961	Grimsby Town (5)	A	1–3	Bedford	10599	1
18 February 1961	Hull City (13)	H	2–1	Keen, Bedford	12210	1
25 February 1961	Tranmere Rovers (21)	A	2–1	Evans, Woods (pen)	9226	1
4 March 1961	Port Vale (6)	H	1–0	Evans	12711	1
11 March 1961	Southend United (17)	A	0–0		10987	2
18 March 1961	Chesterfield	H	1–2	Bedford	8858	2
25 March 1961	Bury	A	0–1		14701	2
31 March 1961	Swindon	H	3–1	Barber (12'), Evans (28'), Angell (63' pen)	14436	2
1 April 1961	Walsall (2)	H	1–0	Longbottom	14288	2
3 April 1961	Swindon	A	0–1		11568	2
8 April 1961	Shrewsbury Town (15)	A	1–4	Evans	8386	3
15 April 1961	Halifax Town (10)	H	5–1	Bedford 4, Lazarus	9069	3
17 April 1961	Halifax Town (11)	A	1–1	Andrews	4194	3
22 April 1961	Torquay	A	6–1	Evans 3, Lazarus, Bedford, Bettany (og)	5436	3
26 April 1961	Reading (21)	A	1–3	Longbottom	15058	3
29 April 1961	Watford (4)	H	2–1	Evans, Longbottom	10328	3

=== London Challenge Cup ===
Date	Round	Opponents	H / A	Result F–A	Scorers	Attendance
28 September 1960	First Round	Fulham	H	2–0		
18 October 1960	Quarter-Finals	Chelsea	A	0–4		

=== Football League Cup ===
Date	Round	Opponents	H / A	Result F–A	Scorers	Attendance
17 October 1960	First Round	Port Vale (Third Division)	H	2–2	Lazarus, Rutter	6,600
19 October 1960	First Round Replay	Port Vale (Third Division)	A	1–3	Bedford	6,800

=== FA Cup ===
Date	Round	Opponents	H / A	Result F–A	Scorers	Attendance
5 November 1960	First Round	Walthamstow Avenue (Isthmian League)	H	3–2	Bedford 3	5,373
26 November 1960	Second Round	Coventry City (Third Division)	A	1–2	Longbottom	8,927

== Friendlies ==
Date	Opponents	Score
6-Aug-60	GB Olympic XI v Queens Park Rangers	Friendly
13-Aug-60	Blue v Red	Practice Match
13-Mar-61	Queens Park Rangers v England U23	Private

== Squad ==
Position	Nationality	Name	League Appearances	League Goals	Cup Appearances	League.Cup Goals	F.A.Cup Goals	Total Appearances	Total Goals
GK	(England)	Ray Drinkwater	45		4			49	
GK	(England)	Mike Pinner	1					1	
DF	(England)	Tony Ingham	46		4			50	
DF	(England)	Peter Carey	16	1	1			17	1
DF	(England)	Keith Rutter	46		4		1	50	1
DF	(England)	Pat Woods	33	5	2			35	5
DF	(England)	Peter Baker	13					13	
MF	(England)	Ken Whitfield	12	3	2			14	3
MF	(England)	David Cockell	9		1			10	
MF	(England)	Mike Keen	35	2	2			37	2
MF	(England)	Mark Lazarus	31	12	2		1	33	13
MF	(England)	Peter Angell	46	1	2			48	1
MF	(England)	Arthur Longbottom	26	4	1	1		27	5
FW	(England)	Colin Whitaker	8					8	
FW	(England)	Mike Barber	14	3				14	3
FW	(England)	Norman Golding	8					8	
FW	(Wales)	Brian Bedford	46	33	2	3	1	48	37
FW	(England)	Bernard Evans	27	16				27	16
FW	(England)	Clive Clark	23	6	1			24	6
FW	(Wales)	Jimmy Andrews	33	6	1			34	6

== Transfers In ==
Name	from	Date	Fee
Mike Bottoms	Harrow Town	July 1960	
Jimmy Turner		July 1960	
David Cockell	Hounslow Town	23 August 1960	£100
Mark Lazarus	Orient	September 1960	£3,000
Bernard Evans	Wrexham	November 1960	£2,000
Tom Fearey *	Hendon	February ?1961	
Colin Whitaker	Shrewsbury Town	13 February 1961	
Charlie Sells *		March ?1961	
Peter Baker	Sheffield Wednesday	March 1961	
Rodney Slack	Leicester City	14 March 1961	£250
George Francis	Brentford	May 1961	£8,000
Jim Towers	Brentford	May 1961	£8,000
George Bristow	Brentford	May 1961	
Roy Bentley	Fulham	June 1961	Free
Bill Williams	Portsmouth	June 1961	

== Transfers Out ==
Name	from	Date	Fee	Date	Club	Fee
Walter Colgan	Leeds Ashley Road	3 June 1954		July 1960		Free
Les Locke	Bromley	May 1956		July 1960	Guildford City	
Brian Skingley	Crystal P	31 July 1959		July? 1960	Guildford City	Free
John Pearson	Brentford	June 1958		July? 1960	Kettering Town	Free
Peter Carey	Leyton Orient	20 May 1960		November 1960	Colchester United	
Keith Spence		23 June 1959		November 1960	Bradford C	Free
Clive Clark	Leeds United	September 1958		January 1961	West Bromwich Albion	£20,000
Mike Barber	Corinthian Casuals	July 1959		February 1961	Manchester United	
Mike Pinner *	Sheffield W	15 July 1959		Machr 1961	Manchester U	
Ken Whitfield	Brighton	27 July 1959		April 1961	Bideford (Player/Man.)	
Pat Woods	QPR juniors	29 Apr 1950		May 1961	Hellenic (Australia)	Free
Arthur Longbottom	Methley United	3 March 1954		May 1961	Port Vale	£2,000
Norman Golding	Tonbridge	August 1959		May 1961	Kettering Town	
John Hutchins	Sittingbourne	2 February 1959		May 1961	Retired (leg inj.)	
Colin Whitaker	Shrewsbury	13 February 1961		May 1961	Rochdale	
Norman (Jimmy) Golding	Tonbridge	24 August 1959	Free	June 1961	Kettering Town	
