= Frank Brady Sr. =

Irish footballer

Frank Brady
Personal information
- Date of birth: 4 October 1891
- Place of birth: Dublin, Ireland
- Position: Defender

Senior career*
Years	Team	Apps	(Gls)
- Belfast Celtic F.C.
- Glentoran F.C.
- Linfield F.C.
- Aberavon F.C.
- Cardiff City F.C.
1925–1927	Fordsons		
1934–1935	Aldershot	4	(2)

International career
1926–1927	Irish Free State	2	(0)
1920s	League of Ireland XI		
- * Club domestic league appearances and goals

Frank Brady (born 4 October 1891 – 15 December 1971) was an Irish footballer who played for Fordsons and the Irish Free State during the 1920s. He is the great-uncle of legendary Republic of Ireland international Liam Brady. Another great-nephew and brother of Liam, Ray Brady was also an Irish international. A third great-nephew and Brady brother, Pat was also a professional footballer. A fourth great-nephew, Frank, won the FAI Cup with Shamrock Rovers in 1968.

Brady played twice for the Irish Free State during the 1920s. He made his international debut in a 3–0 away defeat against Italy on 21 March 1926. His teammates on that day included Harry Cannon, Jack McCarthy and Bob Fullam. Brady was a controversial inclusion in the team. At the time he was in dispute with his club, Fordsons, having been dropped for an FAI Cup replay against Shelbourne on 16 January. He took no further part in his club's successful cup campaign and did not retain his place until after his return from Italy. However, during this time he played for a League of Ireland XI in a 3–1 win against an Irish League XI and impressed the selectors. In the subsequent game against Italy he played at right-back and, despite finishing on the losing side, put in an impressive performance.

Brady won his second cap on 23 April 1927 against an Italy B team in a 2–1 defeat at Lansdowne Road. Playing as a left-back, Brady captained a team that also included Tommy Muldoon, Mick O'Brien, Joe Kendrick, Harry Duggan, Bob Fullam and Bill Lacey.

Brady is one of five players to have captained his country at senior level and played in the Munster Senior League, along with Noel Cantwell, Al Finucane, Shay Brennan and Roy Keane.

== Sources ==
- The Boys In Green - The FAI International Story (1997): Sean Ryan Amazon.ca
