= William Lansdowne =

William Lansdowne may refer to:

== Association football ==
- William Lansdowne, Sr., better known as Bill Lansdowne, English former professional footballer who played for West Ham United
- William Lansdowne, Jr., better known as Billy Lansdowne, English former professional footballer who played for West Ham United, Charlton Athletic, Gillingham and Kalmar

== Other ==
- William Petty, 2nd Earl of Shelburne and 1st Marquess of Lansdowne, British Prime Minister between 1782 and 1783.
- William Lansdowne Beale, High Sheriff of Berkshire in 1893
- William Lansdowne, former Police Chief of the San Diego Police Department (California)
