= Roy Smith (footballer, born 1936) =

English footballer (1936–2015)

Personal information
- Date of birth: 19 March 1936
- Place of birth: Rawalpindi, British India
- Date of death: 14 April 2015 (aged 79)
- Place of death: Sydney, Australia
- Position: Outside right

Senior career*
Years	Team	Apps	(Gls)
–1955	Hereford United		
1955–1957	West Ham United	6	(1)
1962–	Portsmouth		
- * Club domestic league appearances and goals

Roy Smith (19 March 1936 – 14 April 2015) was an English footballer who played as an outside right for Hereford United, West Ham United and Portsmouth.

== Footballing career ==
Born in Rawalpindi, British India, to English parents, Smith played for Woodford youth team after his parents returned to the UK. As an amateur footballer he played for Hereford United before signing professionally for West Ham in 1955 and making his debut against Stoke City on 2 April 1956. Smith played only nine times in his West Ham career in all competitions, scoring one goal. At the end of the 1956-57 season his contract was not renewed by West Ham and he emigrated with his parents. He returned to the UK in the early 1960s, signing for Portsmouth in 1962.

Smith died on 14 April 2015, at the age of 79.
