= Liam Brady =

Irish footballer and manager (born 1956)

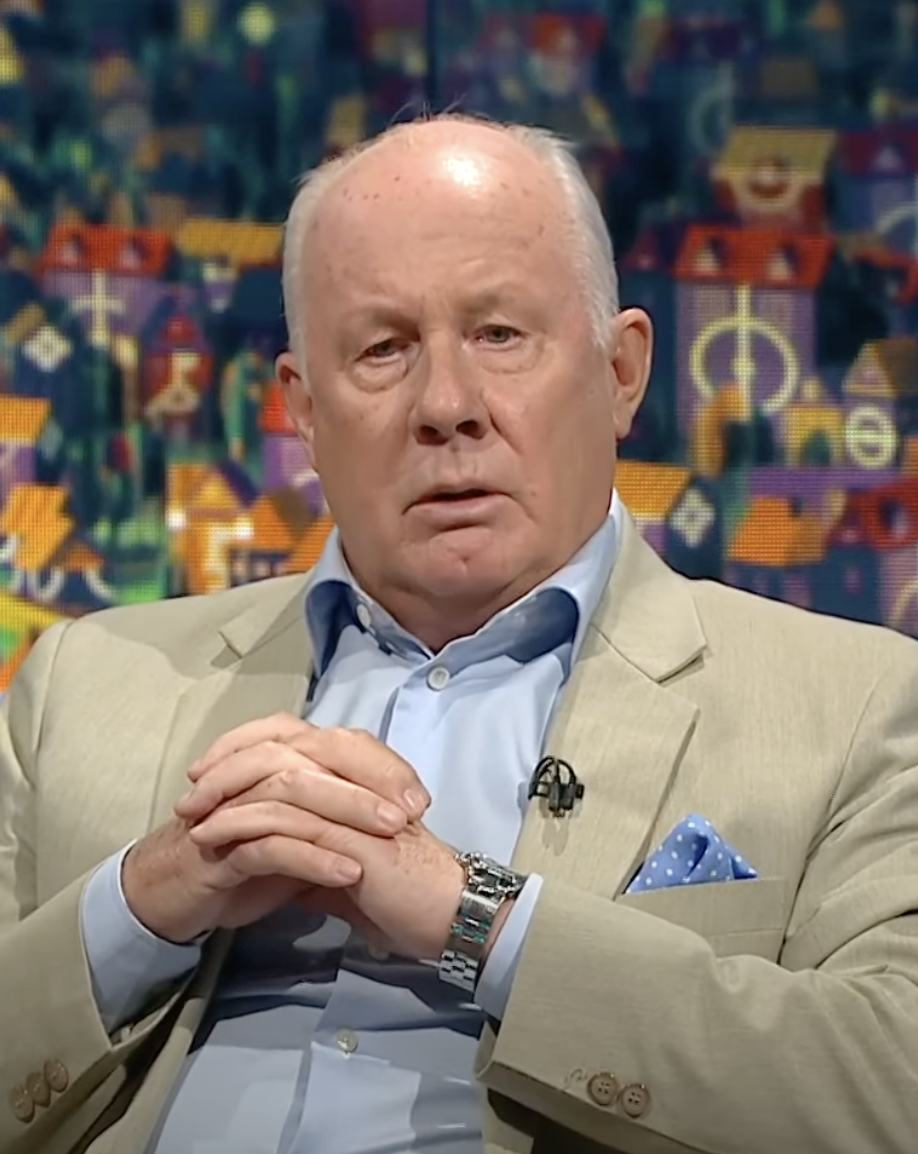
- Brady in 2021

Personal information
- Full name: William Brady
- Date of birth: 13 February 1956 (age 70)
- Place of birth: Dublin, Ireland
- Height: 5 ft 9 in (1.75 m)
- Position: Attacking midfielder

Youth career
- St. Kevin's Boys
- 1971–1973: Arsenal

Senior career*
Years	Team	Apps	(Gls)
1973–1980	Arsenal	235	(43)
1980–1982	Juventus	57	(13)
1982–1984	Sampdoria	57	(6)
1984–1986	Internazionale	58	(5)
1986–1987	Ascoli	17	(0)
1987–1990	West Ham United	75	(8)
Total		499	(75)

International career
1974–1990	Republic of Ireland	72	(9)

Managerial career
- 1991–1993: Celtic
- 1993–1995: Brighton & Hove Albion
- 2008–2010: Republic of Ireland (assistant)
- * Club domestic league appearances and goals

William Brady (born 13 February 1956) is an Irish former footballer and pundit. He found success both in England with Arsenal, where he won an FA Cup in 1979, and in Italy with Juventus, winning two Serie A titles. Brady was capped 72 times for the Republic of Ireland national team.

Brady was an attacking midfielder, renowned for his left foot and technical skills such as his passing, vision and close control.

Brady went on to manage Celtic and Brighton and Hove Albion. He was the assistant manager of the Republic of Ireland national football team from 2008 to 2010 and also held the post of Head of Youth Development at Arsenal from 1996 to 2013. He began his media career as a television pundit in 1990 with the BBC, before moving to RTÉ Sport in 1998. In June 2023, Brady announced that he would step down from his punditry duties with RTÉ after 25 years.

== Early life and family ==
Brady was born and raised in Dublin in a footballing family, with both his great uncle Frank Brady Sr. and older brother Ray Brady winning senior international caps. Of his other brothers, Frank won the FAI Cup with Shamrock Rovers in 1968 and made two appearances in the UEFA Cup Winners' Cup, while Pat played with Millwall and Queens Park Rangers. Liam attended St. Aidan's C.B.S., leaving before his Intermediate Certificate. He alleged at the time that he had been expelled for missing a school Gaelic football match to play a schoolboy soccer international; the school denied this.

== Club career ==
Brady started his career at Arsenal, moving to London to join the side on schoolboy forms in 1971, at the age of 15. He turned professional on his 17th birthday in 1973, and made his debut on 6 October 1973 against Birmingham City as a substitute for Jeff Blockley, and put in an assured performance. However his next match, in a North London derby against Tottenham Hotspur, Brady had a poor match, and Arsenal manager Bertie Mee decided from then on to use the young Irishman sparingly for the time being. Brady ended the 1973–74 season with 13 appearances (four of them as substitute) to his name. While at Arsenal, and particularly early in his career, Brady was nicknamed "Chippy", not for his ability to chip the ball but for his fondness for fish and chips.

In 1974–75 Brady was a first-team regular at Arsenal, and shone as a rare light in a side that hovered close to relegation for a couple of seasons in the mid-1970s. With the appointment of Terry Neill as manager and the return of Don Howe as coach, Brady found his best form. His passing provided the ammunition for Arsenal's front men such as Malcolm Macdonald and Frank Stapleton, and Arsenal reached three FA Cup finals in a row between 1978 and 1980. Arsenal won only the middle of the three, against Manchester United in the 1979 final, with Brady starting the move that ended in Alan Sunderland's famous last-minute winner.

Brady was at the peak of his Arsenal form by now, as shown by one of his best goals for Arsenal; having dispossessed Peter Taylor he flighted a looped curled shot from the edge of the penalty area into the top corner, in a 5–0 win against Tottenham Hotspur on 23 December 1978. During this time he was voted the club's player of the year three times, and chosen as the PFA Players' Player of the Year in 1979. He was the first foreign player to win the award.

The Arsenal side at the time was young and promising, and looked to consistently challenge for honours such as the Division One title. Despite this, by the 1979–80 season rumour was rife that Brady would be leaving the club in search of a fresh challenge.

That season, Arsenal reached the Cup Winners' Cup final (losing to Valencia on penalties), having beaten Juventus 2–1 over two legs in the semi-finals. Brady's performance in the tie impressed the Italian giants and in the 1980 close season they signed him for just over £500,000, becoming the first foreign player to sign for the club since the Italian borders were re-opened for foreign transfers in 1980. He is remembered as one of Arsenal's all-time greats, playing 307 matches for the Gunners, scoring 59 goals and setting up many more.

Brady spent two seasons with Juventus, wearing the number 10 shirt, and picking up two Italian Championship medals, in 1981 and 1982; Brady scored the only goal (a penalty) in the 1–0 win against Catanzaro that won the 1982 title. After the arrival of Michel Platini in summer 1982, Brady moved to Sampdoria, allowing him to take the number 10 shirt and team up with Trevor Francis. Brady moved on after two years in which Sampdoria failed to finish higher than sixth place, and went on to play for Internazionale (1984–1986). At the San Siro, Brady teamed up with Karl-Heinz Rummenigge, reaching a UEFA Cup semi-final and a third place finish domestically, but failed to win any major honours. In 1986, Brady joined Ascoli, where his career in Italy reached a sour conclusion. A year spent arguing over failed payments of wages with club president Costantino Rozzi, marked the end of what was a much celebrated chapter of his career.

Brady, at the age of 31, returned to London in March 1987, for a transfer fee of £100,000, to play for West Ham United, where he scored 10 goals in 119 games in all competitions. He was a member of the side relegated from the First Division in 1989 and played one season in the Second Division before finally retiring as a player in 1990. His last game came on 5 May 1990, a 4–0 home win against Wolverhampton Wanderers, a game in which he scored.

== International career ==
Brady made his debut for Ireland on 30 October 1974, in a 3–0 win against the Soviet Union at Dalymount Park in a European Championship qualifier. Brady has claimed his favourite international goal was that against Brazil in 1987.

Due to a suspension accrued before Euro 88 he was not eligible to play within the tournament. During qualification for Italia 90 Brady retired from the international game. As Ireland got to the World Cup for the first time ever he declared himself available to play once again. However, Jack Charlton went on to declare that only those who played in the qualifiers would make the trip to Italy.

He won 72 international caps for the Republic of Ireland with 70 within the starting line-up, scoring nine goals.

== Managerial career ==
After retiring from playing in 1990, he managed Celtic between 1991 and 1993, and then Brighton & Hove Albion between 1993 and 1995. Neither spell was particularly successful, and at both clubs Brady's tenure was overshadowed by the respective clubs' financial problems. At Celtic, Brady failed to win a single trophy in his two-year tenure, which included a 5–2 defeat on aggregate by Neuchâtel Xamax in the 1991–92 UEFA Cup.

Brady had no greater success with Brighton, departing following a disagreement over the way the club was being run. He later led an unsuccessful bid by a consortium to buy the club.

He rejoined Arsenal in July 1996, as Head of Youth Development and Academy Director. Although he was linked to the manager's post after the departure of Bruce Rioch, Brady stated he was not interested in the role and Arsène Wenger eventually took up the post. Under Brady, Arsenal's youth sides won the 1998 FA Premier Youth League, the FA Premier Academy League U17 title in 2000 and the FA Premier Academy League U19 title in 2002. Under his watch they also lifted the 2009 and 2010 FA Premier Academy League U18 titles, together with the FA Youth Cup in 2000, 2001 and 2009.

After the sacking of Steve Staunton as Republic of Ireland manager in 2007, Brady became an assistant to new manager Giovanni Trapattoni alongside former Juventus teammate Marco Tardelli in 2008, while continuing to work as Director of the Arsenal Youth Academy. He stepped down from the Republic of Ireland post in April 2010 when his contract expired. He stated he would have gladly stayed on with Ireland were it not for his Arsenal commitments.

On 30 January 2013, Arsenal announced that Brady would leave his role as Director of the Arsenal Youth Academy in May 2014.

Brady has served as an ambassador of The Arsenal Foundation since 2017.

== Media career ==
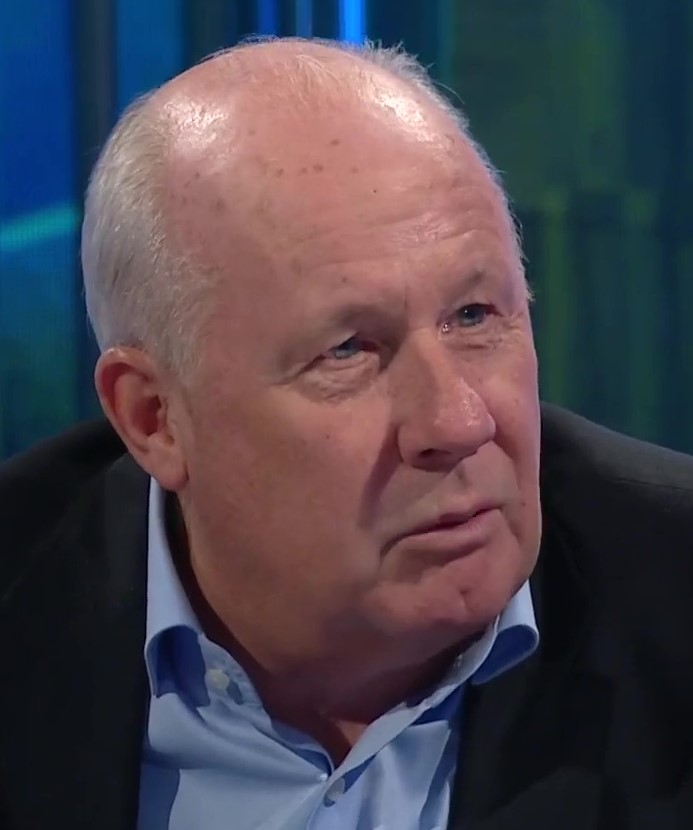
Brady with RTÉ Sport in 2020

Brady first worked as a pundit for the BBC at the 1990 and 1994 World Cups before moving for the 1998 tournament to RTÉ Sport. He joined what became a long-running studio team with fellow pundits Johnny Giles and Eamon Dunphy and presenter Bill O'Herlihy. They were parodied by the Après Match sketches in which Brady was portrayed by Barry Murphy. Brady remained an RTÉ television analyst, appearing on coverage of the 2018 World Cup, UEFA Euro 2020 and 2022 World Cup.

Brady was involved in an Irish anti-drugs campaign in the early 1990s, called "give drugs the boot", which encouraged young boys to play sport as a healthy pastime.

In February 2023, a documentary about his life called Liam Brady: The Irishman Abroad aired on RTÉ One.

On 19 June 2023, Brady announced that he would step down from his punditry duties with RTÉ Sport after 25 years. His final match as an analyst was the 3–0 win against Gibraltar.

== Playing statistics ==
=== International ===
Appearances and goals by national team and year
National team	Year	Apps	Goals
Republic of Ireland	1974	2	0
Republic of Ireland	1975	5	0
Republic of Ireland	1976	5	1
Republic of Ireland	1977	4	1
Republic of Ireland	1978	3	0
Republic of Ireland	1979	5	0
Republic of Ireland	1980	6	0
Republic of Ireland	1981	3	0
Republic of Ireland	1982	6	1
Republic of Ireland	1983	4	3
Republic of Ireland	1984	5	0
Republic of Ireland	1985	8	1
Republic of Ireland	1986	4	1
Republic of Ireland	1987	7	1
Republic of Ireland	1988	0	0
Republic of Ireland	1989	4	0
Republic of Ireland	1990	1	0
Total		72	9

Scores and results list the Republic of Ireland's goal tally first, score column indicates score after each Brady goal.

List of international goals scored by Liam Brady
No.	Cap	Date	Venue	Opponent	Result	Competition
1	8	24 March 1976	Dalymount Park, Dublin, Ireland	Norway	3–0	Friendly
2	14	30 March 1977	Lansdowne Road, Dublin, Ireland	France	1–0	1978 FIFA World Cup qualification
3	36	30 May 1982	Arima Municipal Stadium, Arima, Trinidad and Tobago	Trinidad and Tobago	1–2	Friendly
4	42	12 October 1983	Dalymount Park, Dublin, Ireland	Netherlands	2–3	UEFA Euro 1984 qualification
5	43	16 November 1983	Dalymount Park, Dublin, Ireland	Malta	8–0	UEFA Euro 1984 qualification
6	43	16 November 1983	Dalymount Park, Dublin, Ireland	Malta	8–0	UEFA Euro 1984 qualification
7	50	26 March 1985	Wembley Stadium, London, England	England	2–1	Friendly
8	58	10 September 1986	Heysel Stadium, Brussels, Belgium	Belgium	2–2	UEFA Euro 1988 qualification
9	64	23 May 1987	Lansdowne Road, Dublin, Ireland	Brazil	1–0	Friendly

== Managerial statistics ==
Managerial record by team and tenure
Team	From	To	Record				
Team	From	To	M	W	D	L	Win %
(Scotland) Celtic	19 June 1991	7 October 1993	116	66	26	24	56.90
(England) Brighton & Hove Albion	15 December 1993	20 November 1995	100	33	30	37	33.00
Total			216	99	56	61	45.83

== Honours ==
=== As a player ===
Arsenal

- FA Cup: 1978–79; runner-up: 1977–78, 1979–80
- UEFA Cup Winners' Cup runner-up: 1979–80

Juventus

- Serie A: 1980–81, 1981–82

Republic of Ireland

- Iceland Triangular Tournament: 1986

Individual

- Arsenal Player of the Season: 1975–76, 1977–78, 1978–79
- PFA Team of the Year: 1977–78 First Division, 1978–79 First Division, 1979–80 First Division
- Ballon d'Or Nominated: 1979, 1980, 1981, 1983
- PFA Players' Player of the Year: 1978–79
- Onze Mondial: Onze de Onze (Ideal team of the season) 1980
- Serie A Team of The Year: 1983
- Football League 100 Legends: 1998
- FAI Hall of Fame: 2001
- English Football Hall of Fame: 2006
- The Irish Post: Outstanding Sports Personality

=== As a manager ===
- Younger's Tartan Special Manager of the Month: August 1992
- Manager of the Month: September 1994

== See also ==
- List of European association football families

== Sources ==
- Born to be a Footballer: My Autobiography by Liam Brady (ISBN 9781804180792)
