= George Wright (footballer, born 1930) =

English footballer (1930–2000)

Personal information
- Date of birth: 19 March 1930
- Place of birth: Ramsgate, England
- Date of death: 7 September 2000 (aged 70)
- Height: 5 ft 9 in (1.75 m)
- Position: Right-back

Youth career
- 1948–1949: Thanet Press

Senior career*
Years	Team	Apps	(Gls)
	Ramsgate Athletic	0	(0)
1950–1951	Margate		
1951–1958	West Ham United	161	(0)
1958–1962	Leyton Orient	87	(1)
1962	Gillingham	4	(0)
1962–1963	Ramsgate Athletic		
- * Club domestic league appearances and goals

George Wright (19 March 1930 – 7 September 2000) was an English footballer who played as a right-back.

Wright was born in Ramsgate, Kent and began his career at Ramsgate Athletic. He played for Margate, where he made 22 appearances, before joining West Ham United in February 1951.

Wright made his League debut for West Ham in an away loss against Hull City on 1 September 1951, along with Margate teammate Doug Bing and Bert Hawkins. He went on to make 161 League, and 9 cup appearances for the east London club, and played his last game for the Irons on 22 March 1958 against Grimsby Town.

He was a part of the London XI that lost 6–0 to Barcelona in the second leg of the 1958 Inter-Cities Fairs Cup final on 1 May. The following month he moved to Leyton Orient. He played for Gillingham in 1962–63, before returning to Ramsgate.
