= Pat Brady (footballer) =

Irish footballer (1936–2020)

Personal information
- Full name: Patrick Brady
- Date of birth: 11 March 1936
- Place of birth: Dublin, Ireland
- Date of death: 24 August 2020 (aged 84)
- Position: Defender

Youth career
- 1954–1955: Home Farm

Senior career*
Years	Team	Apps	(Gls)
1955–1959	Home Farm		
1959–1963	Millwall	160	(1)
1963–1966	Queens Park Rangers	62	(0)
1966–1968	Gravesend & Northfleet		
- * Club domestic league appearances and goals

Patrick Brady (11 March 1936 – 24 August 2020) was an Irish professional footballer who played with Millwall, QPR and Gravesend & Northfleet.

== Playing career ==
Brady was signed by Millwall in 1959 from Home Farm. His brother Ray had joined Millwall in 1957 winning a Division Four Championship medal in 1962. Brady moved with his brother Ray to QPR in 1963. Brady signed by Alec Stock for QPR from Millwall in 1963 and made his debut in October of that year against Hull City. In all Brady made 62 league appearances for QPR. He finished his playing career at Gravesend & Northfleet.

== Personal life ==
His brothers Ray and Liam and his great uncle Frank Brady Sr. were all Irish internationals. Another brother Frank Brady Jr played for Shamrock Rovers.

In the 1970s, he spent some time as an Economics teacher at Brockley County Grammar School in south east London. He also taught General Education at Paragon boys school in the late 1970s.

Brady died on 24 August 2020 after a long illness.
