= Ray Brady =

Irish footballer

Personal information
- Full name: Thomas Raymond Brady
- Date of birth: 3 June 1937
- Place of birth: Dublin, Ireland
- Date of death: 15 November 2016 (aged 79)
- Height: 5 ft 11 in (1.80 m)
- Position: Defender

Youth career
- 1954–1955: Home Farm

Senior career*
Years	Team	Apps	(Gls)
1955–1957	Transport	37	(8)
1957–1963	Millwall	165	(4)
1963–1966	Queens Park Rangers	88	(0)
1966–1968	Hastings United		
1968–1971	St Patrick's Athletic	49	(0)

International career
1963—1964	Republic of Ireland	6	(0)
- * Club domestic league appearances and goals

Thomas Raymond Brady (3 June 1937 – 15 November 2016) was an Irish international footballer who played in England in the late 1950s and early 1960s with Millwall and Queens Park Rangers.

Brady signed for Millwall from Transport in July 1957. He then signed for QPR in July 1963 and made his debut in August of that year against Charlton Athletic. In all Brady made 88 league appearances for QPR.

His brother Pat played for Millwall from 1959 until he too joined QPR in 1963, and his other brothers Liam and Frank were also professional footballers. His great uncle Frank Brady Sr. was also an Irish international.

Brady won six full caps for the Republic of Ireland in 1963 and 1964. He died on 15 November 2016, at the age of 79.

After retiring from football, he purchased a public house "The Railway and Bicycle" in Sevenoaks, Kent, where he was well known as a local character.

== Honours ==
- Football League Fourth Division (fourth tier)
  - Millwall F.C. 1961-62
