= Doug Bing (footballer) =

English footballer

Personal information
- Full name: Douglas Bing
- Date of birth: 27 October 1928
- Place of birth: Broadstairs, England
- Date of death: 5 February 2013 (aged 84)
- Place of death: Margate, England
- Position: Wing-half

Senior career*
Years	Team	Apps	(Gls)
–1950	St. Peters Old Boys		
1950–1951	Margate		
1951–1955	West Ham United	29	(3)
1955–1959	Margate		
- * Club domestic league appearances and goals

Douglas Bing (27 October 1928 – 5 February 2013) was an English footballer who played as a wing-half in the Football League for West Ham United.

Born in Broadstairs, Bing made 14 first-team appearances for Margate in 1950–51 after joining from local amateur side St. Peters Old Boys. He signed for West Ham United on 1 January 1951 after being recommended by Margate player-manager Almer Hall, who had played for the east London club before joining Margate.

Bing made his debut for West Ham on 1 September 1951, against Hull City. He was never a first-team regular at the club, making 29 Second Division appearances and scoring 3 goals, during his 4 seasons with the Hammers.

In July 1955, Bing returned to Margate. He made 39 appearances during 1955–56 and was made captain for the following campaign. He struggled with injuries for most of his second spell at Hartsdown Park, missing the entire 1957–58 season with a groin problem. After resuming training during the summer of 1958, hopes of a comeback were dashed by further injury and he was forced to retire on doctors' advice in January 1959.
