= Andy Malcolm =

English footballer

- Malcolm at West Ham United

Personal information
- Full name: Andrew Malcolm
- Date of birth: 4 May 1933
- Place of birth: Upton Park, Essex, England
- Date of death: 26 December 2013 (aged 80)
- Place of death: Port Elizabeth, Eastern Cape, South Africa
- Position: Right-half

Youth career
- 1948–1950: West Ham United

Senior career*
Years	Team	Apps	(Gls)
1950–1961	West Ham United	283	(4)
1961–1962	Chelsea	27	(1)
1962–1965	Queens Park Rangers	84	(5)
1965–?	Port Elizabeth City		
- Westview Apollon
1967–1968	Brentwood Town		
- * Club domestic league appearances and goals

Andrew Malcolm (4 May 1933 – 26 December 2013) was an English professional footballer who played as a wing-half in the Football League for West Ham United, Chelsea and Queens Park Rangers.

== Career ==
The son of a train driver, Malcolm was born above a grocery in Upton Park, a short distance from the Boleyn Ground. He joined West Ham United in 1948 from Dury Falls Secondary School in Hornchurch, and worked in the club office as well as playing. With experience of international football as captain of England Schoolboys, he became the first West Ham player to represent England Youth in April 1948 when he played all three games of the International Youth Football Association Tournament, which ended with England beating Netherlands in the Final.

Malcolm made his Eastern Counties League debut for the West Ham 'A' team in January 1949. He signed professional forms with the club in July 1950 and received a £10 signing on fee. His debut in the Football Combination came the following month, and he played his first London Midweek League fixture in October.

After nearly 100 reserve appearances, Malcolm made his senior debut in October 1953, an Essex Professional Cup encounter against Colchester United at Layer Road that the hosts won 5–1. He made his Second Division debut on 5 December against Notts County, another loss. He made 14 League appearances that season, replacing Derek Parker in a team that finished 13th. His three FA Cup appearances included a home tie against Blackpool on 30 January 1954, the day after his father had died. The game ended 1–1, and West Ham lost the replay after Malcolm pulled a thigh muscle.

Malcolm's first full season, 1954–55, saw 38 League appearances. He played 22 League games in 1955–56, and was also part of the team that narrowly missed out on an FA Cup semi-final after losing a sixth-round replay against Tottenham Hotspur. In 1956–57, he made 37 League appearances.

Malcolm was a member of the team that gained Ted Fenton's West Ham promotion as champions of the Second Division in 1957–58. He played in every league game of the campaign, the only player to do so, and scored his first three goals for the club. The season also saw the first award of the 'Hammer of the Year' title and Malcolm became the first player to receive the accolade after being nominated by a journalist at The Stratford Express (subsequent recipients would be awarded the title after a vote by supporters).

The following season, 1958–59, saw a sixth-place finish in the First Division, with Malcolm again an ever-present. He gained a winners medal in the Essex Professional Cup after playing in the final, against Leyton Orient.

In October 1958, Malcolm, along with teammate John Bond, represented the Football League against the Scottish League.

On 16 January 1960, Malcolm's run of 110 consecutive League appearances came to an end. On 5 November 1960, he scored his fourth and final goal for West Ham in a 6–0 drubbing of Arsenal. His final appearance in claret and blue would come on 28 October 1961, a 2–3 loss to Sheffield Wednesday at Upton Park.

Finding that there was no room for his style of play under Ron Greenwood, Malcolm left Hammers after 283 league appearances, one season away from qualifying for a testimonial match. He joined Chelsea in return for £10,000 and centre-forward Ron Tindall in part exchange.

Malcolm made his debut in a struggling Chelsea side on 4 November 1961. He was named captain six games later, taking over duties from Frank Blunstone. He made 27 League appearances for the club, his only goal coming against west London rivals Fulham on 13 January 1962, but was unable to prevent Chelsea's relegation to the Second Division at the end of the 1961–62 season. A dispute with manager Tommy Docherty saw Malcolm hand in a transfer request. This was declined, but a move to Third Division club Queens Park Rangers for £10,000 was to come in October 1962. He made 84 League appearances for QPR under Alec Stock, although an eye injury threatened to end his career in 1964–65.

After leaving QPR in 1965, Malcolm moved to South Africa where he played for two seasons in Port Elizabeth, for Port Elizabeth City and then the Greek side Westview Apollon.

Upon his return to England, Malcolm played for Southern League club Brentwood Town for the 1967–68 season.

== Style of play ==
Malcolm is described in the Who's Who of West Ham United thus:

Feared by the leading inside-forwards of his day because of his ability to close-mark and block his opponents out of the game, Johnny Haynes, Jimmy Greaves and Denis Law all gave testimony to Malcolm's prowess. A tough-tackling unassuming character, he must rank as one of the finest wing-halves the club ever employed.

An obituary in The Independent concurred:

The unobtrusive but unremittingly tough Malcolm was indeed a formidable enforcer who tackled ruthlessly and was tenacious when marking an opposing danger man, especially during his prime with West Ham United. Yet he was deceptively skilful, a precise and perceptive passer endowed with more subtle shades of ability than most ball-winning wing-halves of his era.

== After football ==
After his retirement from football, Malcolm worked at ice cream company Lyons and then became a publican. From 1968, he was landlord of The Ship and Anchor in Maldon, Essex and The Lion in Latchingdon, Essex, and played Sunday league football with some of his customers. In 1986, he emigrated to Port Elizabeth, South Africa.

Malcolm died at his home in Port Elizabeth on 26 December 2013. West Ham club anthem "I'm Forever Blowing Bubbles" played at his funeral.

== Career statistics ==
Club	Season	League			FA Cup		League Cup (Note: Includes appearances in the Southern Floodlight Cup before 1960–61)		Other (Note: Appearances in the Essex Professional Cup)		Total	
Club	Season	Division	Apps	Goals	Apps	Goals	Apps	Goals	Apps	Goals	Apps	Goals
West Ham United	1953–54	Second Division	14	0	3	0	0	0	1	0	18	0
West Ham United	1954–55	Second Division	38	0	2	0	0	0	0	0	40	0
West Ham United	1955–56	Second Division	22	0	6	0	1	0	0	0	29	0
West Ham United	1956–57	Second Division	37	0	2	0	3	0	0	0	42	0
West Ham United	1957–58	Second Division	42	3	3	0	2	0	0	0	47	3
West Ham United	1958–59	First Division	42	0	1	0	2	0	1	0	46	0
West Ham United	1959–60	First Division	40	0	2	0	5	0	0	0	47	0
West Ham United	1960–61	First Division	40	1	2	0	2	0	0	0	44	1
West Ham United	1961–62	First Division	8	0	0	0	0	0	0	0	8	0
West Ham United	Total		283	4	21	0	15	0	2	0	321	4
Chelsea	1961–62	First Division	27	1	1	0	0	0	0	0	28	1
Chelsea	1962–63	Second Division	0	0	0	0	0	0	0	0	0	0
Chelsea	Total		27	1	1	0	0	0	0	0	28	1
Queens Park Rangers	1962–63	Third Division	31	5	3	0	0	0	0	0	34	5
Queens Park Rangers	1963–64	Third Division	31	0	3	1	1	0	0	0	35	1
Queens Park Rangers	1964–65	Third Division	22	0	2	0	1	0	0	0	25	0
Queens Park Rangers	Total		84	5	8	1	2	0	0	0	94	6
Career total			394	10	30	1	17	0	2	0	443	11

== Honours ==
West Ham United

- Second Division winner: 1957–58
- Football Combination Cup winner: 1953–54
- Essex Professional Cup winner: 1958–59
- Southern Floodlight Cup runner-up: 1959–60

Individual

- Hammer of the Year: 1958
