= Frank Cruickshank =

Scottish footballer

Personal information
- Full name: Frank James Cruickshank
- Date of birth: 20 November 1931
- Place of birth: Polmont, Scotland
- Date of death: 20 January 2015 (aged 83)
- Position: Defender

Senior career*
Years	Team	Apps	(Gls)
1949	Burnley	0	(0)
1949–1953	Nuneaton Borough	?	(?)
1953–1960	Notts County	151	(5)
1960–1961	Cheltenham Town	?	(?)
1961–1964	Cambridge City	?	(?)

Managerial career
- 1962–1964: Cambridge City (Player-Manager)
- * Club domestic league appearances and goals

Frank James Cruickshank (20 November 1931 – 20 January 2015) was a Scottish former professional footballer who played as a full back.
