= Mick Newman =

English footballer (1932–2022)

Personal information
- Full name: Harry Maurice Newman
- Date of birth: 2 April 1932
- Place of birth: London, Ontario, Canada
- Date of death: 8 February 2022 (aged 89)
- Position: Inside forward

Senior career*
Years	Team	Apps	(Gls)
–1957	Dagenham		
1957–1958	West Ham United	7	(2)
1958–????	Dartford		
Total		7	(2)
- * Club domestic league appearances and goals

Harry Maurice "Mick" Newman (2 April 1932 – 8 February 2022) was an English amateur footballer who played as an inside forward for Dagenham, West Ham United and Dartford.

== Career ==
Born in Ontario, Canada, on 2 April 1932, Newman's family moved to England when he was three.

He played for Dagenham in the Delphian League in the early to mid-1950s, winning the title twice before joining West Ham United in February 1957 aged 24 and making his debut against Doncaster Rovers on 16 March 1957. He played for West Ham as an amateur, combining his footballing with his job in the family dry cleaning business. He played in the West Ham side which won the 1957-58 Second Division but played only three games that season scoring once, in a 6–1 win against Lincoln City at Sincil Bank. He played the following week, and scored again, in a 1–1 home draw against Ipswich Town. This was his last appearance in the Football League. He played only nine times in his West Ham career, scoring three goals. He signed for Dartford in 1958. Newman was the last player of amateur status to play for the West Ham first team.

== Personal life and death ==
Newman was married with two daughters and died on 8 February 2022, at the age of 89.
