= Derek Gibbs =

English footballer

Personal information
- Full name: Derek William Gibbs
- Date of birth: 22 December 1934
- Place of birth: Fulham, London, England
- Date of death: 19 November 2009 (aged 74)
- Place of death: Bridgend, Wales
- Position: Forward

Youth career
- South Ruislip
- Ruislip Manor
- 1951–1957: Chelsea

Senior career*
Years	Team	Apps	(Gls)
1957–1960	Chelsea	23	(5)
1960–1963	Leyton Orient	33	(4)
1963–1965	Queens Park Rangers	27	(0)
- Romford
Total		83	(9)
- * Club domestic league appearances and goals

Derek William Gibbs (22 December 1934 – 19 November 2009) was an English professional footballer who played as a forward.

== Club career ==
Born in Fulham, Gibbs started his career with South Ruislip and Ruislip Manor, before joining Chelsea, where he made his debut in 1957. After 23 appearances for The Blues, in which he scored five goals, Gibbs moved to Leyton Orient in 1960. After escaping injury following a car accident, Gibbs moved to Queens Park Rangers in 1963. His spell with The R's was unsuccessful, as he failed to score in 27 league appearances before moving to non-league Romford, where he finished his career.

== Death ==
Gibbs died on 19 November 2009 in Bridgend, Wales.
