= Terry McQuade =

English footballer

Personal information
- Full name: Terence James McQuade
- Date of birth: 24 February 1941 (age 85)
- Place of birth: Holborn, London, England
- Position: Outside left

Senior career*
Years	Team	Apps	(Gls)
- Enfield
1961–1963	Millwall	34	(170)
1963–1964	Queens Park Rangers	20	(2)
1964–1965	Dover Town	?	(?)
1965–1966	Millwall	3	(1)
1966	Corby Town	?	(?)
1966	Addington	13	(1)
1967	Durban City	?	(?)
Total		57	(180)
- * Club domestic league appearances and goals

Terence James McQuade (born 24 February 1941) is an English footballer who played as an outside left in the Football League.
