= Albert Foan =

English footballer

Personal information
- Full name: Albert Thomas Foan
- Date of birth: 30 October 1923
- Place of birth: Rotherhithe, London, England
- Date of death: 14 August 2009 (aged 85)
- Place of death: Norwich, England
- Positions: Striker; midfielder

Senior career*
Years	Team	Apps	(Gls)
1947–1950	Norwich City	18	(4)
1950–1957	West Ham United	53	(6)
1957–1961	Margate		
1961–1966	Lowestoft Town		
1966–1968	Great Yarmouth Town		
- * Club domestic league appearances and goals as of 09:30,30 August 2009 2009 (UTC)

Albert Foan (30 October 1923 – 14 August 2009) was an English footballer who played for Norwich City, West Ham United, Margate, Lowestoft Town and Great Yarmouth.

== Career ==
Foan was a veteran of British Expeditionary Force in World War II and played his early football in his military days. His first footballing honours came with London Boys before being signed by Norwich City in 1947. After 3 seasons with Norwich he joined West Ham United where he remained until 1957 making 61 appearances and scoring nine goals in all competitions including scoring a hat-trick in an FA Cup game against Preston on 7 January 1956.

After leaving West Ham Foan went on to play for Margate where in 1957, aged 33, he was appointed club captain. Nicknamed 'General Foan' by the local press he went on to make 178 appearances for Margate scoring 29 goals. Foan left Margate in 1961 and joined Lowestoft Town. A highlight at the end of Foan's career, Lowestoft played in the FA Cup in round one, away at Leyton Orient in the 1966–67 season. Although losing 2–1, Foan, aged 43, played on the wing in a return to his native East End.

Joining in the 1966–67 season Foan has a brief spell with Great Yarmouth Town before he retired.

After retirement from the game he did some coaching for Norwich City and went to work for the city council.

Foan died on 14 August 2009 in a Norwich nursing home.
