= Bob Wyllie =

Scottish footballer

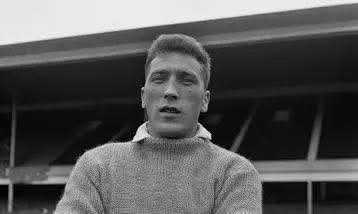
- Pictured in the 1950s

Personal information
- Full name: Robinson Gourlay Nicholl Wyllie
- Date of birth: 4 April 1929
- Place of birth: Dundee, Scotland
- Date of death: May 1981 (aged 52)
- Place of death: Alfreton, Derbyshire, England
- Position: Goalkeeper

Senior career*
Years	Team	Apps	(Gls)
1949–1953	Dundee United	86	(0)
1953–1956	Blackpool	13	(0)
1956–1958	West Ham United	13	(0)
1958–1959	Plymouth Argyle	5	(0)
1959–1962	Mansfield Town	92	(0)
- * Club domestic league appearances and goals

Robinson Gourlay Nicholl "Bob" Wyllie (4 April 1929 – May 1981) was a Scottish footballer who played as a goalkeeper.

Wyllie began his career with hometown club Dundee United and made nearly 100 league appearances before moving to English side Blackpool. After just eleven league appearances, Wyllie moved on to West Ham United and after a similar number of matches, moved on again, this time to Plymouth Argyle. Playing in just a handful of matches at Plymouth, Wyllie saw out his career at Mansfield Town, becoming a regular at Field Mill and by the time he retired from the senior game in 1962, he had made over 200 career league appearances.

Wyllie died in 1981 after settling in Alfreton, Derbyshire.
