= Alan Blackburn =

English footballer

Personal information
- Date of birth: 4 August 1935
- Place of birth: Pleasley, Mansfield
- Date of death: January 2014 (aged 78)
- Position: Forward

Youth career
- West Ham United

Senior career*
Years	Team	Apps	(Gls)
1954–1958	West Ham United	15	(3)
1958–1961	Halifax Town	124	(35)
1961–1965	Margate		
1965–1968	Wellington Town		
1968	Stevenage Athletic		
- * Club domestic league appearances and goals

Alan Blackburn (4 August 1935 – January 2014) was an English footballer. He played outside-left professionally for West Ham United and Halifax Town between 1954 and 1961, making a total of 139 Football League appearances. After his time in the Football League, Blackburn went on to play for non-league clubs including Margate, Wellington Town and Stevenage Athletic. Blackburn died in January 2014.
