= Peter Baker (footballer, born 1934) =

English footballer (1934–2021)

Personal information
- Full name: Peter Robert Baker
- Date of birth: 24 August 1934
- Date of death: August 2021 (aged 86–87)
- Place of death: Southend-on-Sea
- Position: Fullback

Senior career*
Years	Team	Apps	(Gls)
1954–1957	Tottenham Hotspur		
1957	Sheffield Wednesday	11	
1961–1963	Queens Park Rangers	27	(0)
1963	Romford		
- * Club domestic league appearances and goals

Peter Robert Baker (24 August 1934 – August 2021) was an English footballer. He played League football as a fullback for Sheffield Wednesday and Queens Park Rangers.

Baker was born in West Ham on 24 August 1934. He started his career as an amateur at Tottenham Hotspur before joining Sheffield Wednesday at the start of the 1957-58 season. During his spell at Hillsborough he made eleven league appearances and also played in one FA Cup match. Baker died in Southend-on-Sea in August 2021.
