= Stuart Leary =

South African sportsman

Personal information
- Full name: Stuart Edward Leary
- Date of birth: 30 April 1933
- Place of birth: Cape Town, South Africa
- Date of death: 21 August 1988 (aged 55)
- Place of death: Table Mountain, South Africa
- Position: Centre-forward

Youth career
- 1948–1950: Clyde F.C. (Cape Town)

Senior career*
Years	Team	Apps	(Gls)
1950–1962	Charlton Athletic	376	(153)
1962–1966	Queens Park Rangers	94	(29)
Total		470	(182)

International career
1954	England U23	1	(0)
- * Club domestic league appearances and goals

Stuart Edward Leary (30 April 1933 – 21 August 1988) was a South African sportsman who played professional football as a centre-forward and cricket as an all-rounder.

Leary started his career with Cape Town side Clyde before moving to English side Charlton Athletic in 1950 along with team-mate Eddie Firmani. He was one of a number of South Africans to move to The Valley in this era. After making his debut in 1951, he became a prolific goal-scorer scoring a record number of league goals for the club. Despite being South African born, he appeared for the England under-23 team but was prevented from representing the full team by the Football Association who banned non-English-born players from representing the national team. During his period of National Service he served with the Royal Air Force. In all, he made 403 appearances for the Addicks, scoring 163. After failing to agree a new contract, he joined Queens Park Rangers in 1962 and remained there until his retirement in 1966.

Leary also had a long and successful career as a first-class cricketer for Kent County Cricket Club between 1951 and 1971. He scored 16,517 runs at a batting average of 31 and took 146 wickets at an average of 34.

His body was discovered on Table Mountain in South Africa on 23 August 1988. It was believed he had died two days earlier after taking his own life.
