= Brian Taylor (footballer, born 1944) =

English footballer

Personal information
- Full name: Brian Taylor
- Date of birth: 2 July 1944
- Place of birth: Hammersmith, England
- Date of death: 7 December 2013 (aged 69)
- Place of death: Ealing, England
- Position: Full back

Senior career*
Years	Team	Apps	(Gls)
1962–1966	Queens Park Rangers	50	(0)
- Romford
Total		50	(0)
- * Club domestic league appearances and goals

Brian Taylor (2 July 1944 – 7 December 2013) was an English professional footballer who played as a full back.

== Career ==
Born in Hammersmith, Taylor played for Queens Park Rangers and Romford.
