= Fred Cooper (footballer) =

English footballer

Personal information
- Date of birth: 18 November 1934
- Place of birth: West Ham, England
- Date of death: 1 April 1972 (aged 37)
- Place of death: England
- Position: Full-back

Youth career
- West Ham United

Senior career*
Years	Team	Apps	(Gls)
1955–1958	West Ham United	4	(0)
- * Club domestic league appearances and goals as of 19 November 2009

Fred Cooper (6 November 1934 – 1 April 1972) was an English professional footballer who played as a full-back.

== Career ==
Cooper started his career as a member of the ground staff for West Ham United joining from school, aged fifteen, in 1949. He played and won honours with West Ham Boys, London boys and Essex boys teams and played in the first England Boys international at Wembley, conceding a penalty in the first few minutes against Scotland in a match which England won 8 - 2.

His West Ham footballing career started as a reserve player before making his first full appearance in the Southern Floodlight Cup, against Reading, in April 1956. His league debut came in August 1956 in a 4–1 away defeat to Fulham. Making only 3 further league appearances Cooper retired from professional football to become the licensee at the Essex Arms in Stratford.

Cooper died in 1972.
