= Frank Smith (footballer, born 1936) =

English footballer

Personal information
- Date of birth: 30 April 1936
- Place of birth: Colchester, England
- Date of death: 10 March 2022 (aged 85)
- Position: Goalkeeper

Senior career*
Years	Team	Apps	(Gls)
- Corinthian-Casuals
1953–1962	Tottenham Hotspur	0	(0)
1962–1965	Queens Park Rangers	66	(0)
1965–1969	Wimbledon	126	(0)
- * Club domestic league appearances and goals

Frank Smith (30 April 1936 – 10 March 2022) was an English professional footballer who played in the Football League, as a goalkeeper.

Smith was a reserve goalkeeper with Queens Park Rangers when Wimbledon signed him in 1965.

Smith died on 10 March 2022, at the age of 85.
