= Frank Brady Jr. =

Irish footballer

Frank Brady (1948 – 27 October 2009) was an Irish footballer who played as a centre half. He was the brother of Liam Brady.

== Career ==
Brady was born in Dublin. After initially playing for Stella Maris, he joined Shamrock Rovers in July 1967 from Home Farm. He made his debut in a friendly against Everton at Dalymount Park on 4 August 1967. He made his competitive debut in Dundalk on 20 August 1967 in the League of Ireland Shield.

With Shamrock Rovers he won the 1968 FAI Cup.

An ex-youth international, he twice played in the European Cup Winners' Cup for Rovers against Randers FC. He also played professionally in Australia.

After his return home he rejoined Home Farm in 1978 where he played for six seasons in the League of Ireland, making 121 appearances.

== Personal life ==
He was married to Margaret and had two sons. He died of cancer on 27 October 2009.

== Honours ==
Shamrock Rovers

- FAI Cup: 1968

== Sources ==
- Paul Doolan; Robert Goggins. The Hoops. ISBN 0-7171-2121-6.
