= Bill Lansdowne =

English footballer

Personal information
- Full name: William Thomas Michael Lansdowne
- Date of birth: 9 November 1935 (age 90)
- Place of birth: Shoreditch, London, England

Youth career
- Loughton Town

Senior career*
Years	Team	Apps	(Gls)
- Woodford Town
1956–1963	West Ham United	57	(5)
- * Club domestic league appearances and goals

William Thomas Michael Lansdowne (born 9 November 1935) is an English former professional footballer who played as a midfielder.

== Career ==
Born in Shoreditch, Lansdowne attended Shoreditch Secondary School and played junior football with Loughton Town. He began his career in non-league football with Woodford Town, before making his professional debut in the Football League with West Ham United, making 57 league appearances for them between 1956 and 1963. After retiring as a player, Lansdowne joined the coaching staff at West Ham United.

== Personal life ==
His son Billy was also a professional footballer. His grandson, Billy Jr, played for Nybro IF, IFK Berga and Lindsdals IF, in the lower levels of Swedish football.
