= List of honours dedicated to Raoul Wallenberg =

Raoul Wallenberg was a Swedish architect, businessman, diplomat, and humanitarian. He is widely celebrated for saving thousands of Jews in German-occupied Hungary during the Holocaust from German Nazis and Hungarian Arrow Cross perpetrators during the later stages of World War II. He received many awards for his humanitarian activities.

== Honours ==
Wallenberg was nominated twice for the Nobel Peace Prize, in 1948 by more than 50 qualified nominators and in 1949 by a single nominator At the time, the prize could be awarded posthumously, but the concept of such awards was controversial.

=== Argentina ===
In Buenos Aires, there is a monument in honour of Wallenberg in a park. It is a replica of the London monument by Philip Jackson, was unveiled in 1998 and can be seen from the Figueroa Alcorta Avenue, in Recoleta neighbourhood.

=== Australia ===
In Melbourne, a small memorial in honour of Wallenberg stands at the Melbourne Holocaust Museum and Research Centre in Elsternwick; a monument commissioned by the Free Wallenberg Australian Committee by the sculptor Karl Duldig is at Kew Junction on the corner of Princess Street and High Street, Kew; and a tree and memorial seat are in Carlisle St at St Kilda Town Hall. The Australian Centre for Clinical Neuropharmacology in Melbourne adopted the name 'The Raoul Wallenberg Centre' on the occasion of Raoul Wallenberg's 89th birthday. In Sydney are a Raoul Wallenberg garden and sculpture in Woollahra, and a statue inside the Jewish Museum of Australia. Commemorative trees have been planted in front of the federal Parliament and in many other locations.

Established in 1985, Raoul Wallenberg Unit of B'nai B'rith in Melbourne, Australia, with Max Stern & Co, a leading stamp dealer in Melbourne, and Australia Post, released a limited edition Raoul Wallenberg Stamp Sheet and Envelope Set to mark the Unit's 25th anniversary in 2010. The Stamp Sheet shows a photo of Raoul Wallenberg together with a brief outline of his life, a monument in honour of Raoul Wallenberg by artist, Karl Duldig, in the Raoul Wallenberg Garden at Kew Junction, Melbourne, and ten 60 cent Australia Post stamps with tabs of Raoul Wallenberg from early childhood to adult soldier. The Envelope has a transparent front to show the Stamp Sheet; a Schutzpass is shown on the back accompanied by an explanation.

To commemorate the Centenary Year, a limited number of the Raoul Wallenberg Stamp Sheet were stamped with a special Centenary cancellation. These are available from Raoul Wallenberg Unit of B'nai B'rith in Melbourne.

Raoul Wallenberg Unit requested clergy around the world to speak about Raoul Wallenberg and his heroic deeds – 'One Person can Make a Difference' - from their pulpits over the weekend 3–5 August 2012 which coincided with the date of his 100th birthday, 4 August 2012.

Raoul Wallenberg Reserve in the neighbourhood of Yokine in Perth was dedicated in honour of Raoul Wallenberg. The small park is located in close proximity to many of Perth's Jewish institutions including a Jewish Day School, aged care facility, community centre, sports club and orthodox synagogue.

Wallenberg was named Australia's first honorary citizen in May 2013, during his centenary year. Frank Vajda AM was saved by Wallenberg in 1944 from the pro-Nazi Arrow Cross Party and campaigned for decades for him to be recognised with the award. A ceremony at Government House, Canberra, to mark the occasion was held on 6 May 2013, and was attended by Governor-General Quentin Bryce AC CVO, Prime Minister Julia Gillard, and Opposition Leader Tony Abbott. Vajda also attended the ceremony, as did the son of World War II resistance fighter John Farkas, who was the last person known to have seen Wallenberg alive. George Farkas described the award as "recognition that some people can do unbelievable good in the face of reprehensible evil".

A 70 cent Raoul Wallenberg postage stamp and associated philatelic items were released by Australia Post on 5 October 2015, one of three to by honoured in this manner by Australia; the other two are Mother Teresa and Nelson Mandela.

=== Austria ===
In the 22nd district of Vienna a street was named "Raoul-Wallenberg-Gasse".

=== Canada ===
Wallenberg was made the first Honorary Citizen of Canada in 1985; and the government declared 17 January, the day he disappeared, as "Raoul Wallenberg Day" in Canada.

Numerous memorials, parks, and monuments honouring Wallenberg can be found across Canada, including the Raoul Wallenberg Memorial in Queen Elizabeth Park in Vancouver, Raoul Wallenberg Corner in Calgary, Raoul Wallenberg Park in Saskatoon, Raoul Wallenberg Park in Ottawa, Ontario, and a memorial behind Christ Church Cathedral in downtown Montreal, where a bust of Wallenberg and a caged metal box, styled as a barbed-wire gate, stand beside each other. The main entrance to Earl Bales Park in Toronto, Ontario is named Raoul Wallenberg Road.

On 17 January 2013, which marked the 68th anniversary of Wallenberg's arrest by Soviet troops, Canada released a postage stamp in honour of Wallenberg.

In 2008, the Tanenbaum Community Hebrew Academy of Toronto added "Wallenberg" to the name of the school, thus spawning the moniker, Tanenbaum CHAT Wallenberg Campus.

=== Czech Republic ===
A pedestrian pathway near the Swedish embassy in Prague is named after Wallenberg; in Czech - Promenáda Raoula Wallenberga.

=== Georgia ===
A street in the centre of the maritime city of Batumi was named after Raoul Wallenberg and marked with a commemorative plaque in 2013.

=== Germany ===
Streets were named after Wallenberg in both East and West Germany.

=== Chile ===
There is a monument dedicated to Raoul Wallenberg on the Amerigo Vespucci Avenue in Santiago. This memorial locates in front of the Russian Embassy and seems to ask where is him.

=== Hungary ===
Budapest named Wallenberg as an honorary citizen in 2003. Several sites honour him, including Raoul Wallenberg Memorial Park, which commemorates those who saved many of the city's Jews from deportation to extermination camps, and the building that housed the Swedish Embassy in 1945.

In July 2012, Hungary paid tribute to Raoul Wallenberg in a ceremony at Budapest's Holocaust museum, marking 100 years since his birth. Zoltan Balog, Minister for Human Resources and Social Affairs, said that "evil must be rejected".

=== Israel ===
Israel granted Wallenberg honorary citizenship in 1986 and honoured him at the Yad Vashem memorial as one of the Righteous Among the Nations. Other tributes to Wallenberg in Israel include at least five streets named after him. On Raoul Wallenberg Street in Tel Aviv, a statue identical to one in Budapest was installed in 2002 (see below), made by the sculptor Imre Varga.

=== Netherlands ===
- Raoul Wallenbergplantsoen, a street at the (Joodse begraafplaats (Gouda))
- Raoul Wallenberglaan, a street in Utrecht
- Raoul Wallenbergstraat, a street in Amsterdam
- Raoul Wallenberghofje, a street in Amsterdam
- Raoul Wallenbergplein, a square in Alphen aan den Rijn
- Raoul Wallenbergstraat, a street in Haarlem
- Raoul Wallenbergstraat, a street in The Hague
- Raoul Wallenbergstraat, a street in Hengelo
- Raoul Wallenbergplein, a square in Naaldwijk
- Raoul Wallenbergborg, a street in Schiedam

=== Poland ===
A plaque commemorating Wallenberg was unveiled in the centre of Warsaw on the occasion of naming a city street after him. The unveiling ceremony was part of commemorations marking the 73rd anniversary of the start of the Warsaw Ghetto Uprising.

=== Peru ===
A memorial to his name was established in 2013 in the capital city of Lima. Taking the form of a park, it is situated on the coast of the San Miguel District.

=== Russia ===
A memorial to him stands in the courtyard of the Russian Rudomino Library of Foreign Languages in Moscow. In Saint Petersburg, the Institute of Special Pedagogy and Psychology bears Wallenberg's name.

=== Slovakia ===
A memorial to his name was created in the capital city of Bratislava. It is situated on the junction of Skarniclova and Zamocka street.

=== Serbia ===
The FIND RAOUL Organization was founded in 2011 by students from City of Nis, Serbia, in honour of Raoul Wallenberg. The organization is dedicated to preserving his legacy, promoting humanitarian values, young talents and recognizing individuals who demonstrate exceptional courage, solidarity and commitment to helping others.

=== Sweden ===
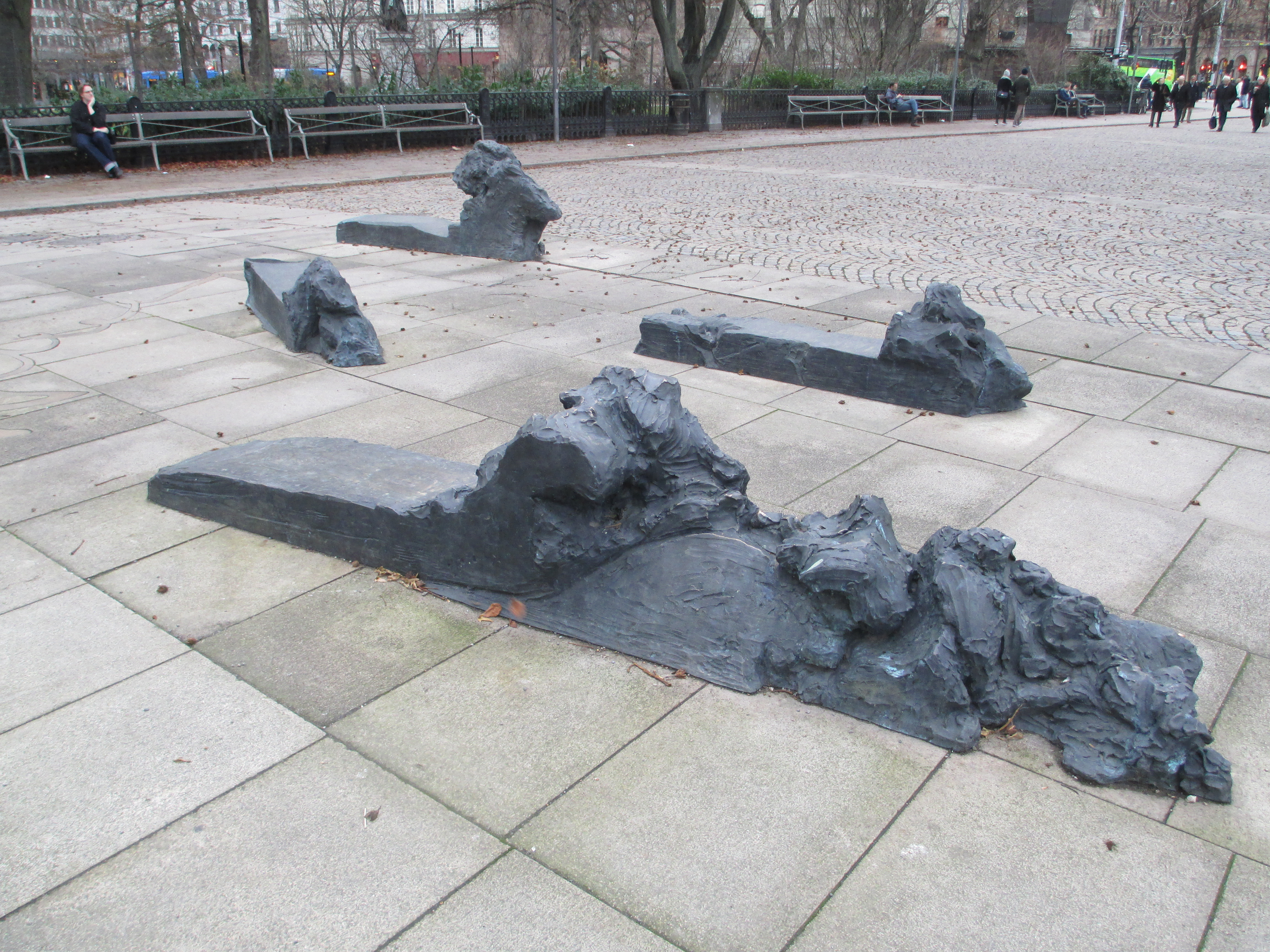
Part of the controversial Stockholm monument of 2001 in 2015

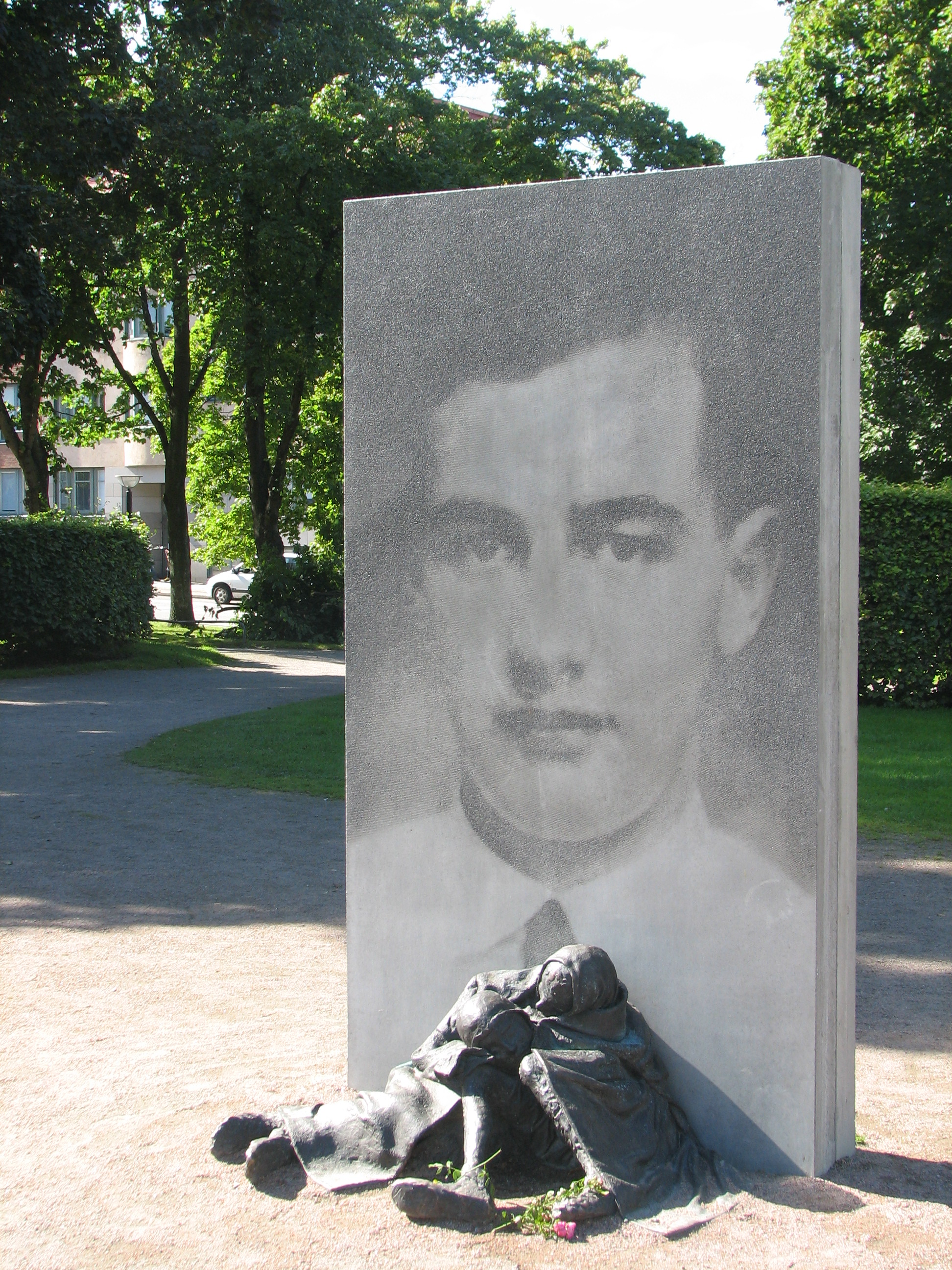
A memorial to Raoul Wallenberg in Gothenburg

In 2001, a memorial was created in Stockholm to honor Wallenberg. It was unveiled by King Carl XVI Gustaf, at a ceremony attended by then UN Secretary General Kofi Annan and his wife Nane Maria Annan, Wallenberg's niece. At the unveiling, King Carl XVI Gustaf said Wallenberg is "a great example to those of us who want to live as fellow humans". Kofi Annan praised him as "an inspiration for all of us to act when we can and to have the courage to help those who are suffering and in need of help". The memorial's design (see photo) has been considered inappropriate by some critics.

A Memorial to Raoul Wallenberg was erected near the Haga Church (Hagakyrkan) in Gothenburg, Sweden. It is a 2.45 meter high monument, made partly of graphic concrete and partly of bronze, and it was created by Charlotte Gyllenhammar of Stockholm, Sweden. It was unveiled on 25 May of 2007 by the UN Secretary-General Kofi Annan.

In 2005, Wallenberg was awarded the Illis quorum.

=== Ukraine ===
Wallenberg Street in Mukachevo and memorial board in Uzhgorod.

=== United Kingdom ===
A monument to Raoul Wallenberg by Scottish sculptor Philip Jackson is located at Great Cumberland Place in London's Marble Arch district, outside the Western Marble Arch Synagogue. It was unveiled by Queen Elizabeth II in 1997, in the presence of the President of Israel, Ezer Weizman, the Secretary General of the United Nations, Kofi Annan, and survivors of the Holocaust. A separate monument stands near the Welsh National War Memorial in Cathays Park, Cardiff. A bronze briefcase monument by Gustav Kraitz with the initials RW is located in the garden of the Beth Shalom Holocaust Centre near Laxton in Nottinghamshire.

=== United States ===
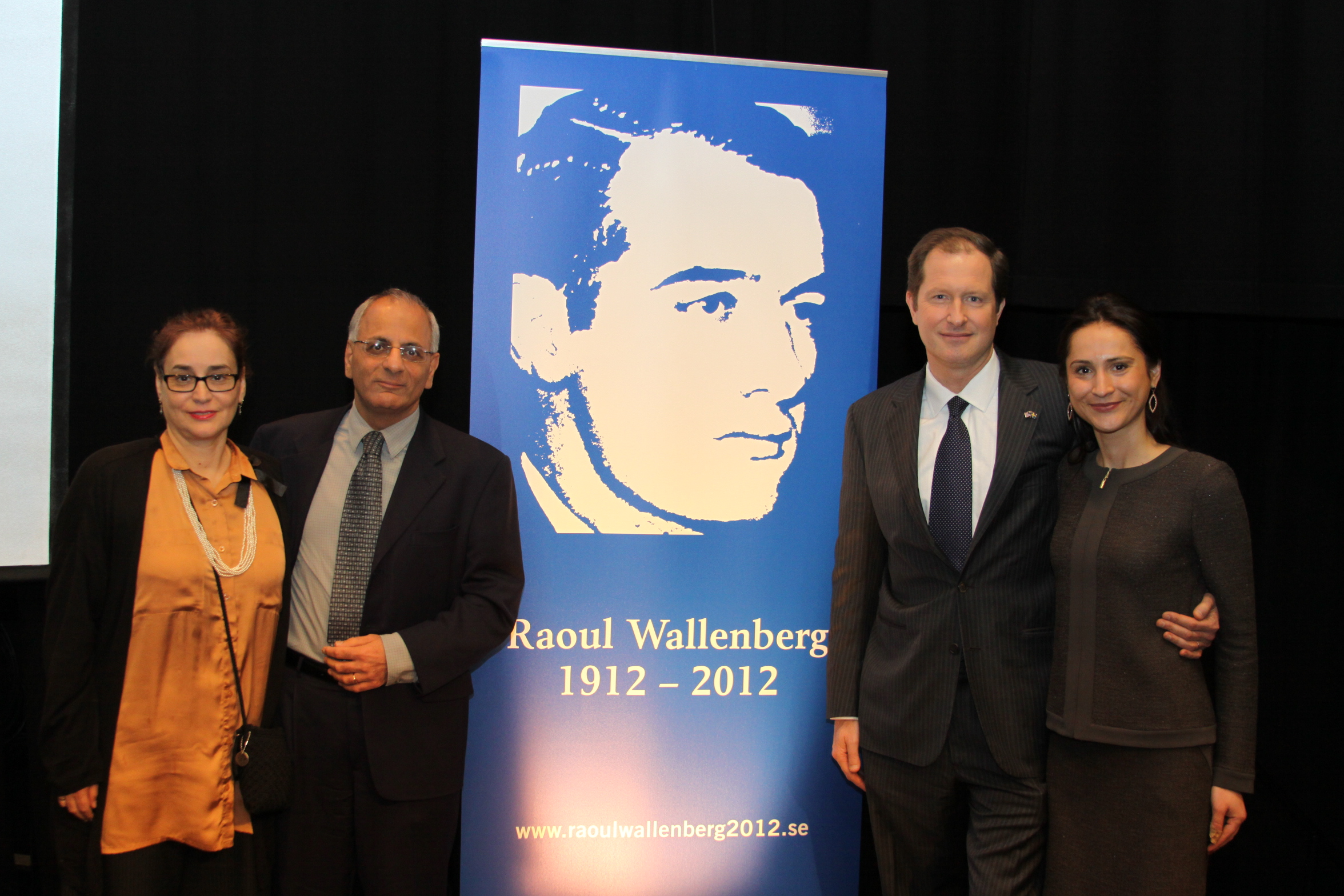
On 26 July 2012, Wallenberg was posthumously awarded a Congressional Gold Medal by the United States Congress "in recognition of his achievements and heroic actions during the Holocaust".

The US Congress made Wallenberg an Honorary Citizen of the United States in 1981, the second person to be so honored, after Winston Churchill.

In 1985, the portion of 15th Street, SW in Washington, D.C., on which the United States Holocaust Memorial Museum is located, was renamed Raoul Wallenberg Place by Act of Congress.

In 1986, the Los Angeles City Council created Raoul Wallenberg Square, followed two years later by the installation of Franco Assetto's 1988 sculpture, "Angel of Rescue" depicting a bronze silhouette of Wallenberg flanked by two polished stainless steel "wings."

In 1997, the United States Postal Service issued a stamp in his honor. Representative Tom Lantos, one of those saved by Wallenberg's actions, said: "It is most appropriate that we honor [him] with a U.S. stamp. In this age devoid of heroes, Wallenberg is the archetype of a hero – one who risked his life day in and day out, to save the lives of tens of thousands of people he did not know whose religion he did not share."

In 1998, a Manhattan monument honoring him was installed on Raoul Wallenberg Walk, named in his honor, across from the headquarters of the United Nations. The Swedish consulate commissioned the piece, Raoul Wallenberg Memorial, New York, created by Swedish sculptor Gustav Kraitz and painter Ulla Kraitz (1998). The sculpture, Hope, is a replica of Wallenberg's briefcase, a sphere, five pillars of black granite, and paving stones (setts) which were formerly used on the streets of the Budapest ghetto. There is also Wallenberg Forest in Riverdale, Bronx, established in 1990 and named Wallenberg Forest in 1996.

A memorial stands in front of the Art and Architecture building at the University of Michigan, where he received his architecture degree in 1935.

Additional places named after Wallenberg include Raoul Wallenberg Traditional High School in San Francisco, the PS 194 Raoul Wallenberg School in Brooklyn, New York, Raoul Wallenberg Avenue in Trenton, New Jersey, Raoul Wallenberg Drive in Hauppauge, New York and Raoul Wallenberg Blvd in Charleston, South Carolina.

Since 2005, the International Raoul Wallenberg Foundation has campaigned to establish 5 October as Raoul Wallenberg Day throughout the United States, as this was the day Wallenberg was awarded Honorary U.S. Citizenship. By 2010, Raoul Wallenberg Day was being observed by the states of Colorado, Connecticut, Illinois, Iowa, Maine, Maryland, Michigan, Nebraska, Nevada, New Jersey, New Mexico, West Virginia, and Wyoming.

Wallenberg was posthumously awarded the Train Foundation's Civil Courage Prize, which recognizes "extraordinary heroes of conscience".

On 26 July 2012, Wallenberg was posthumously awarded a Congressional Gold Medal by the United States Congress "in recognition of his achievements and heroic actions during the Holocaust".

=== Gallery of monuments ===
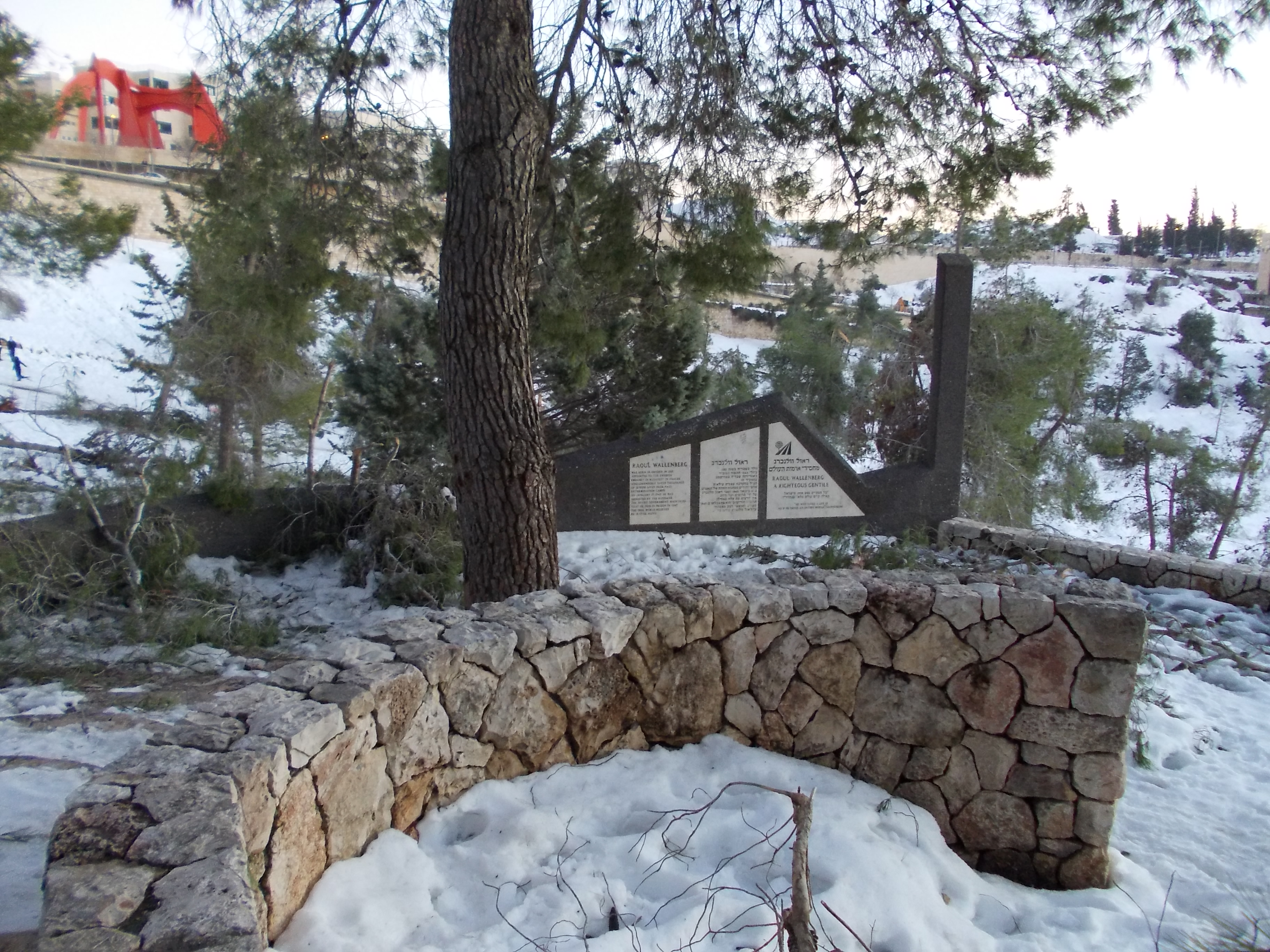
The Raoul Wallenberg memorial tree on the road to Yad Vashem, Jerusalem

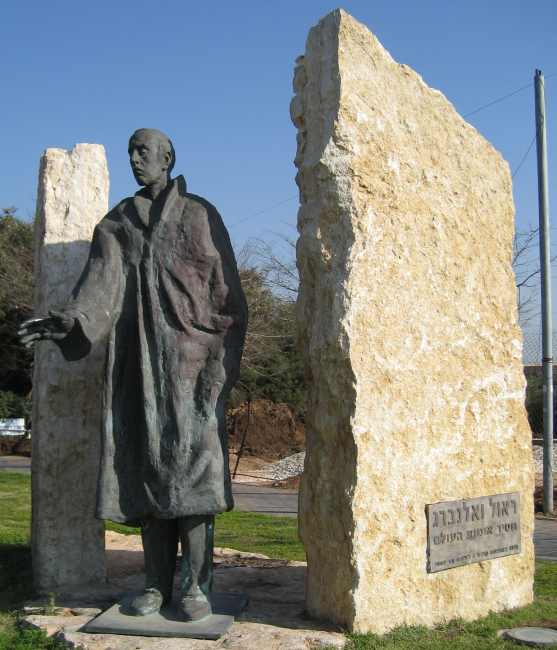
Raoul Wallenberg Memorial, Wallenberg St., Tel Aviv, Israel

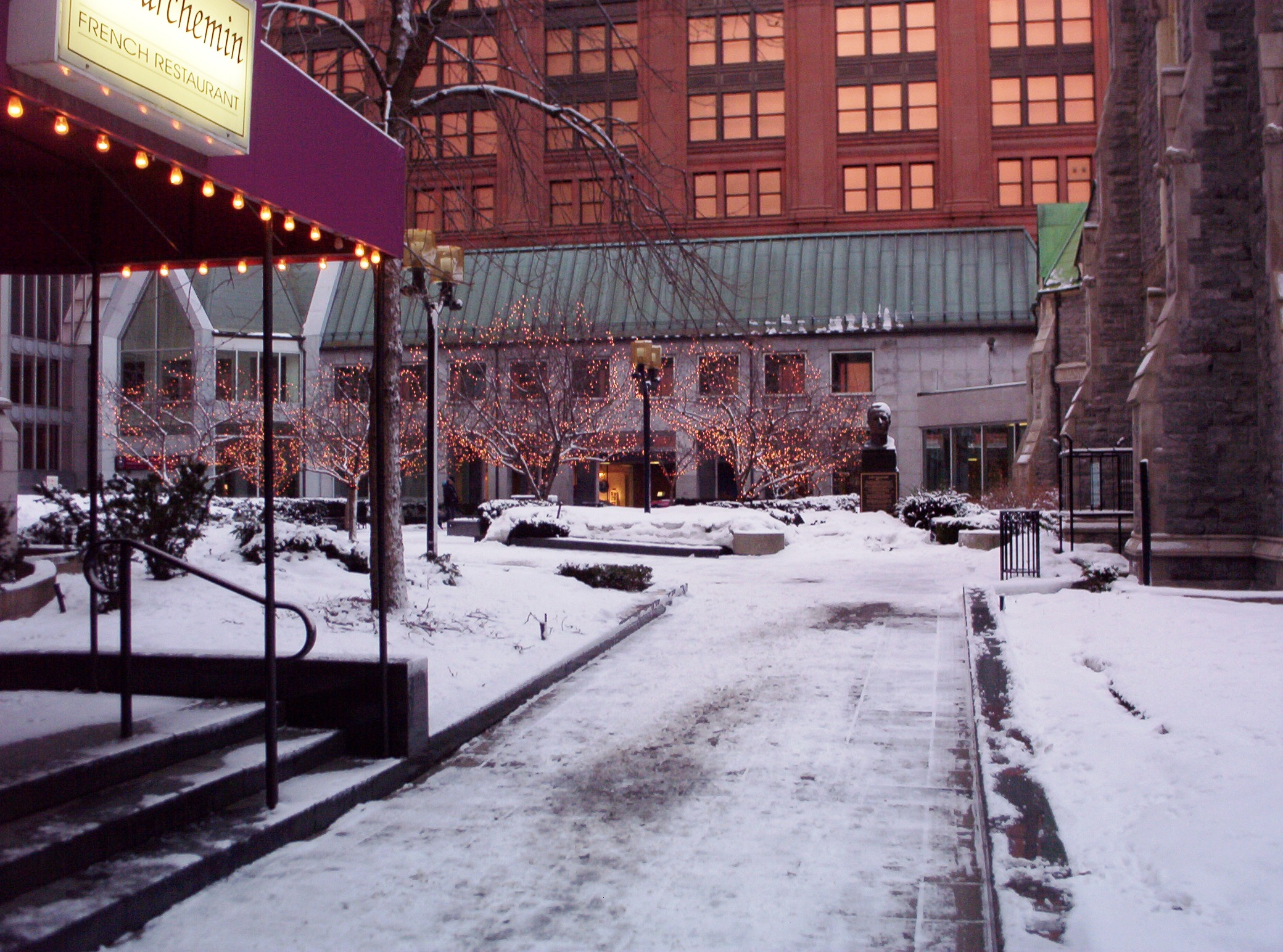
Place Raoul Wallenberg, Montreal

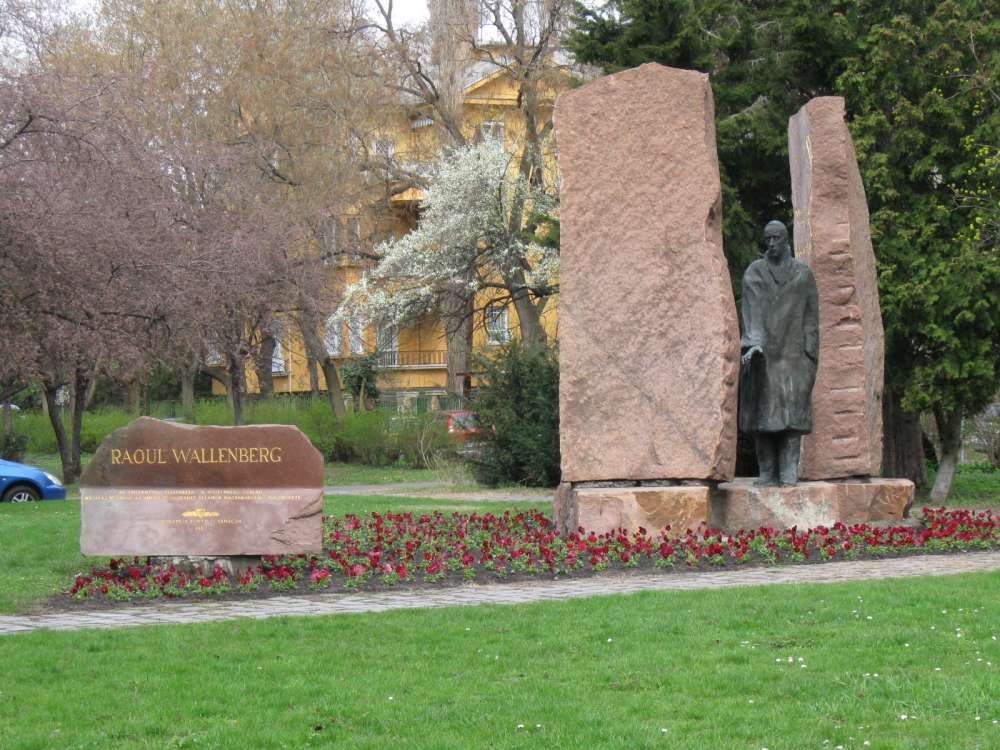
Wallenberg Monument, Budapest

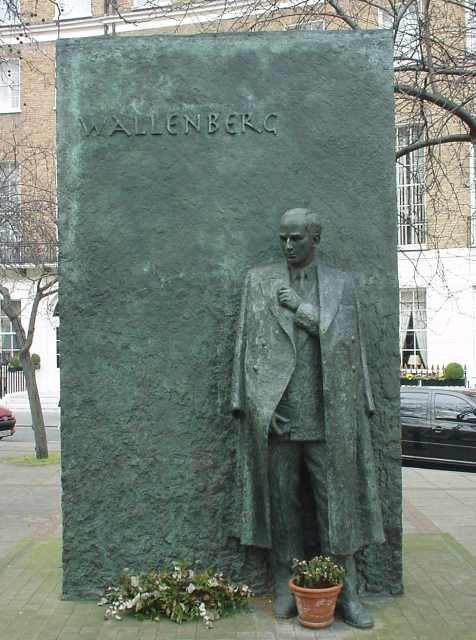
Memorial at Great Cumberland Place, London

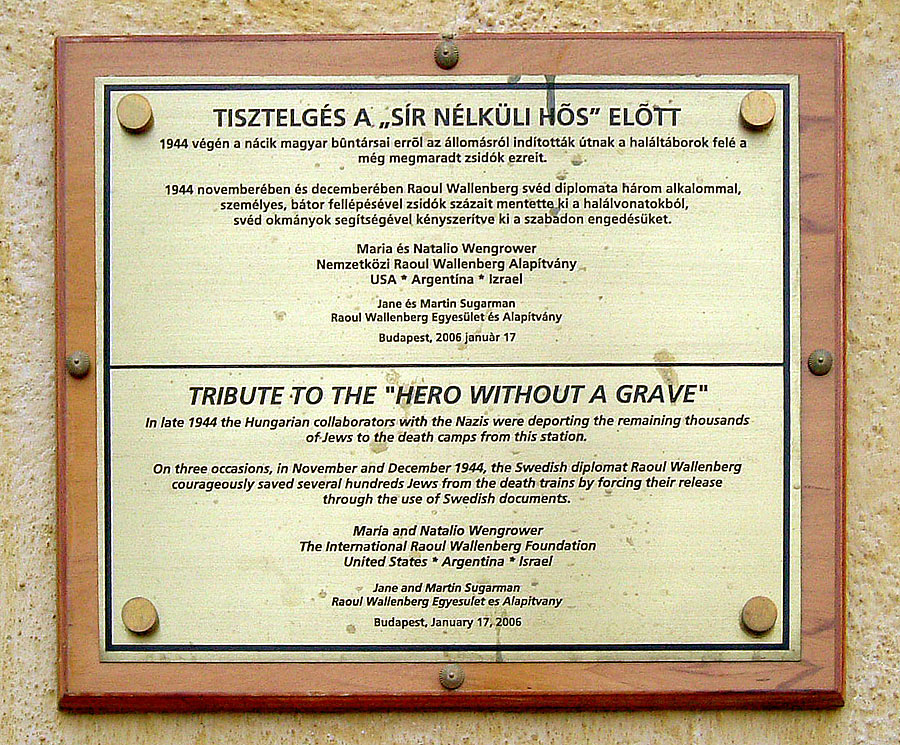
Sign commemorating Wallenberg in Budapest

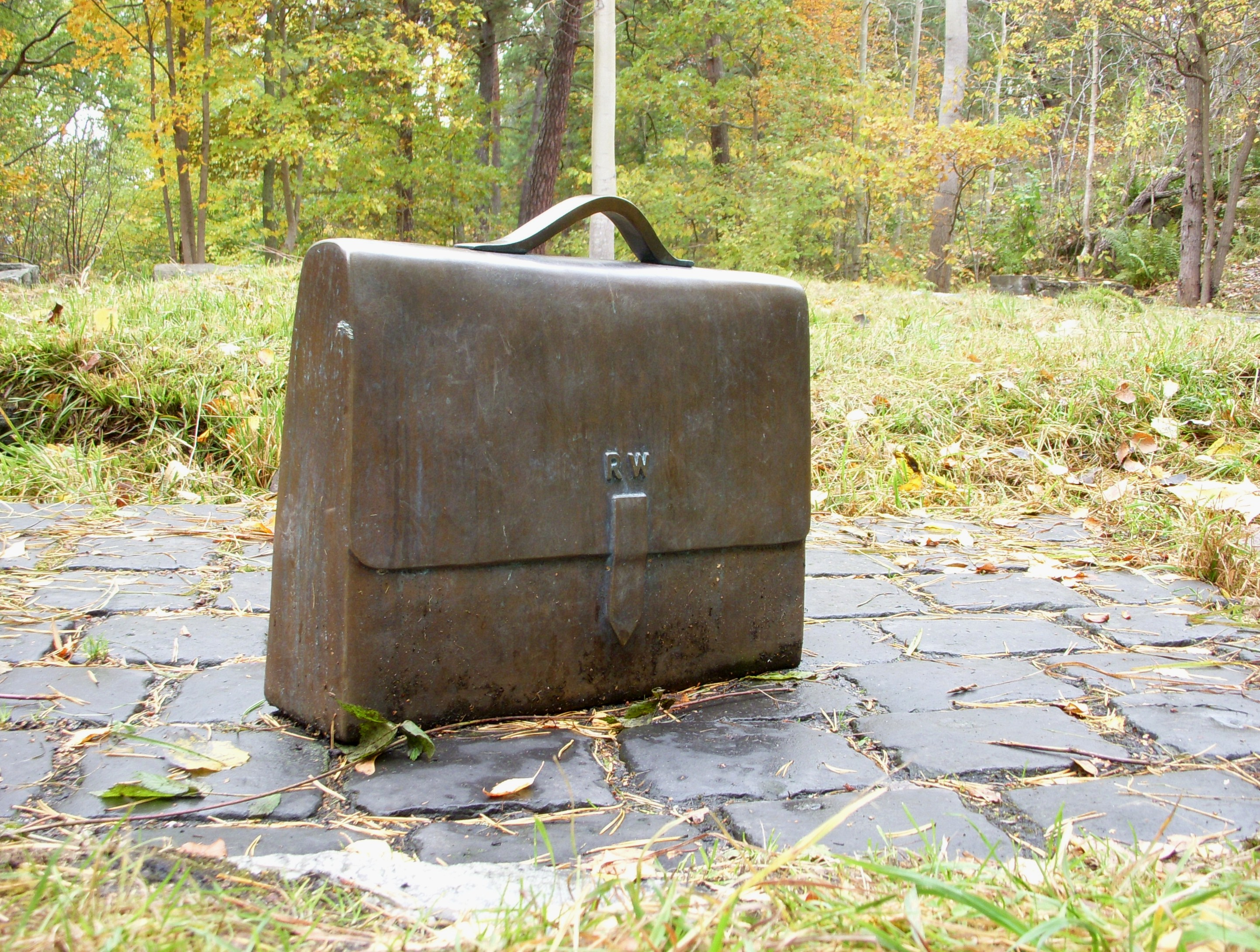
Wallenberg's briefcase in bronze, with the initials R W, set up on the doorstep to the summer house at Kappsta, Lidingö, where Wallenberg was born.It is at 59.340862 N, 18.166985 E. The setts come from Budapest.

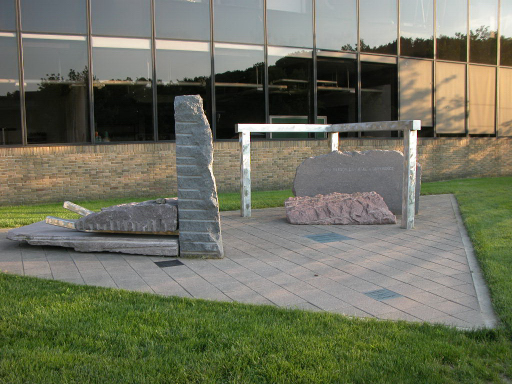
Köszönöm, a monument at the University of Michigan in front of the architecture college building.

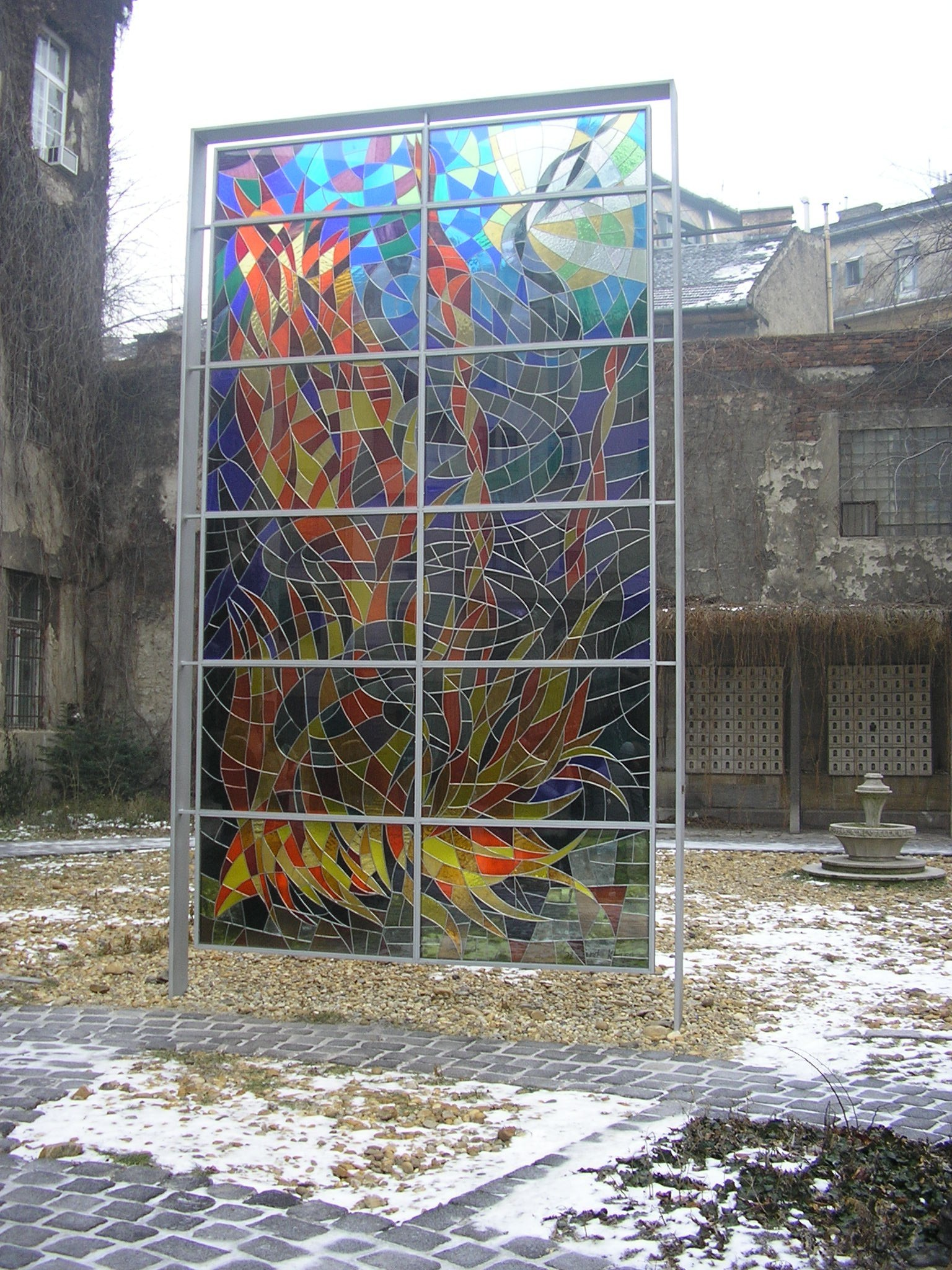
One of the memorials in Budapest

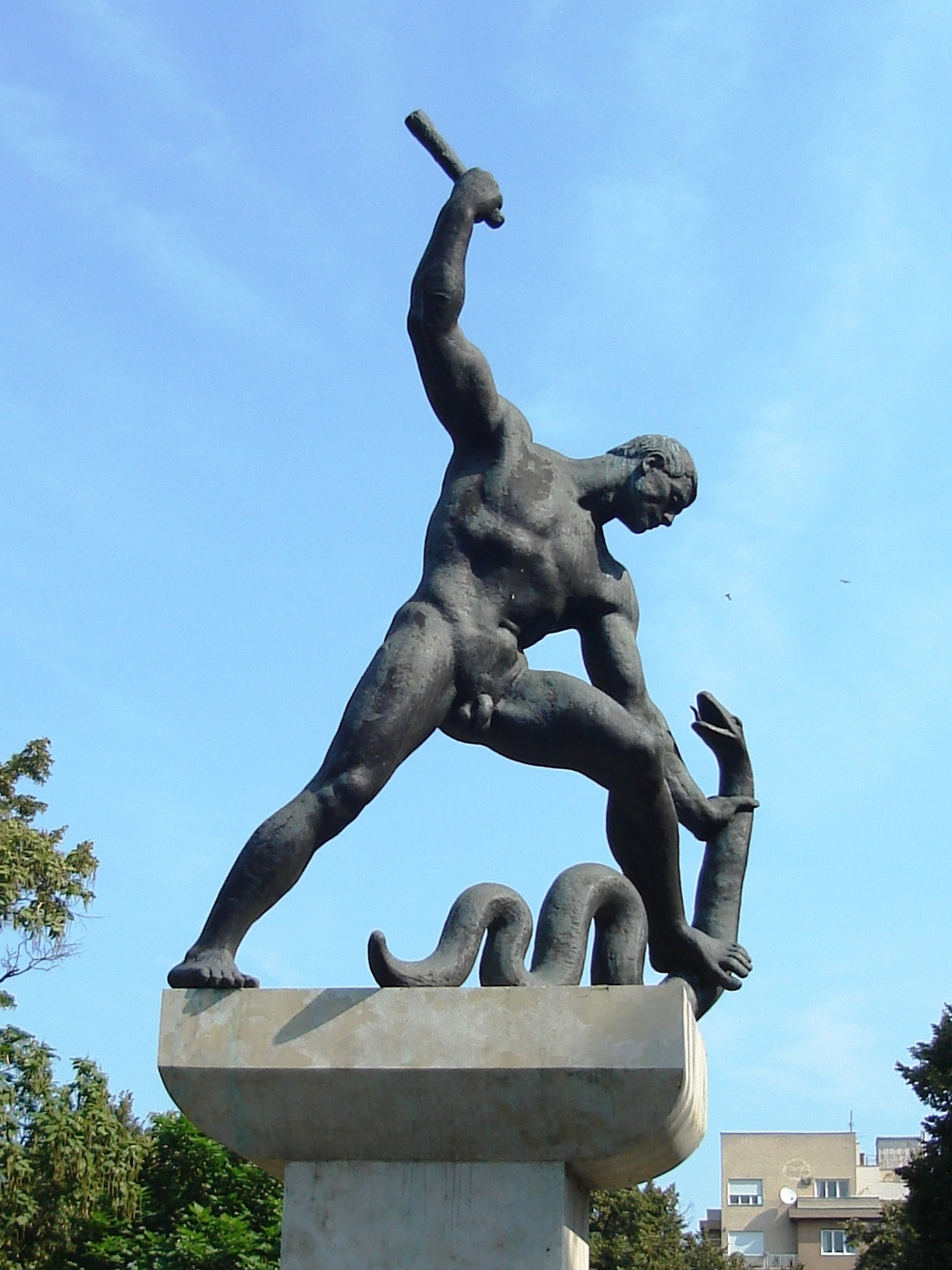
Memorial to Raoul Wallenberg removed by communist regime and restored on the 50th anniversary of its demolition (Budapest, District XIII, Szent István park)

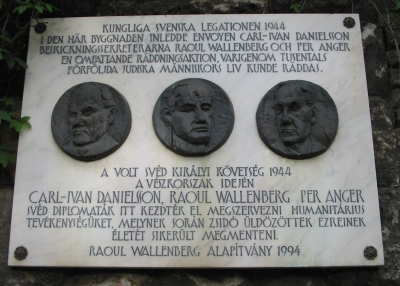
Plaque at the site of the former Swedish Embassy in Budapest, honoring Ivan Danielsson, Wallenberg and Per Anger

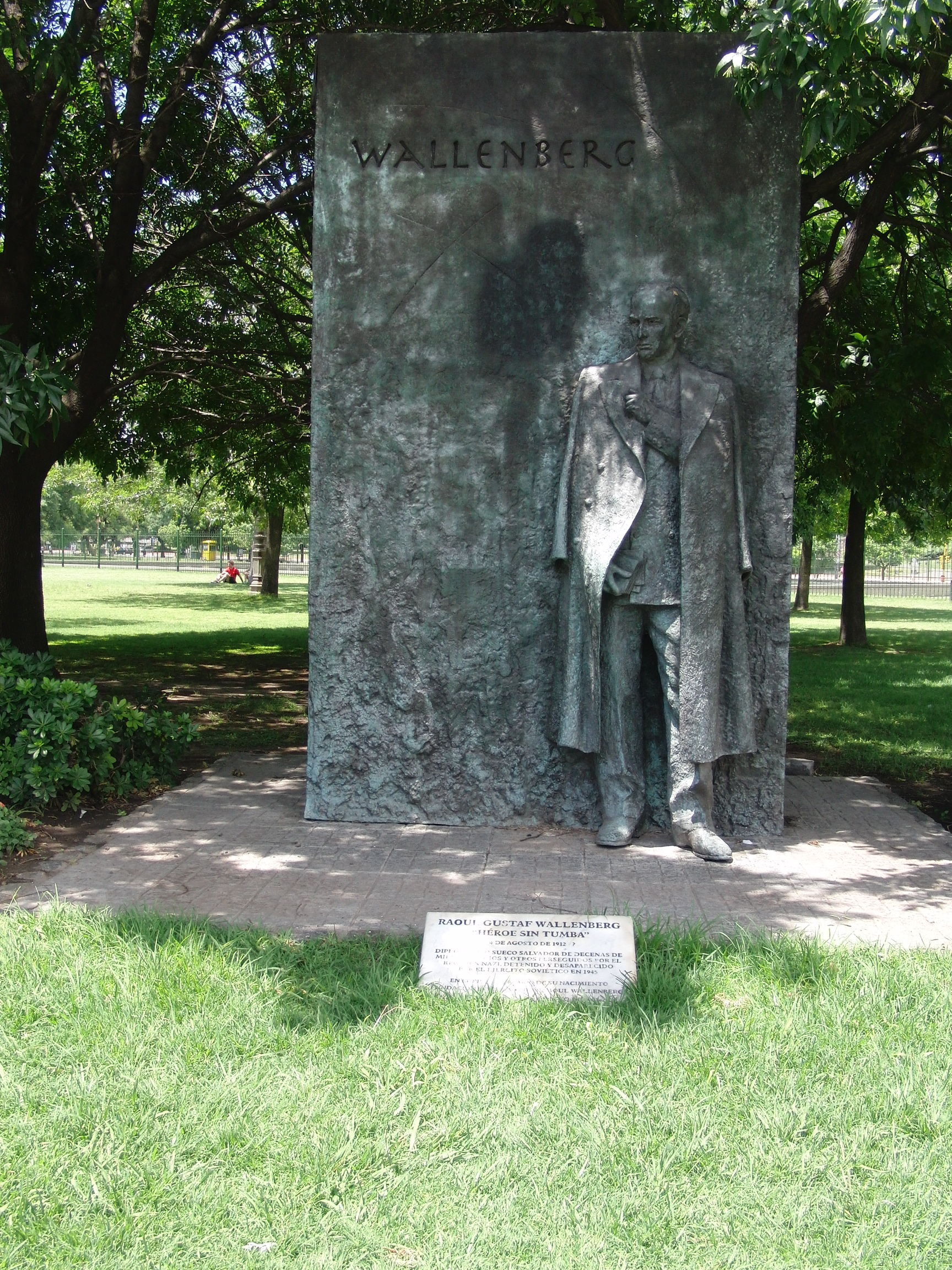
Wallenberg monument of Buenos Aires

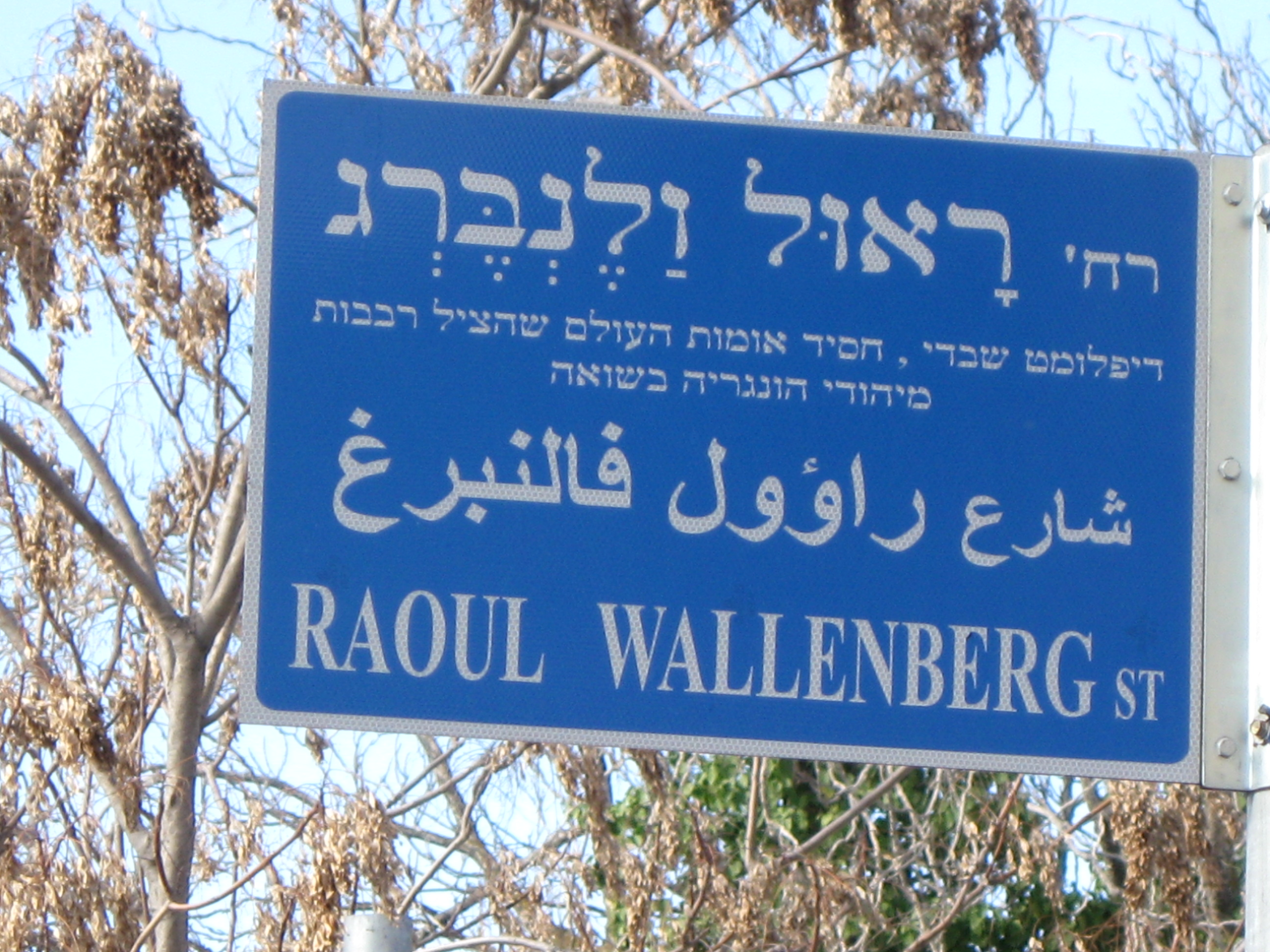
Street sign for Raoul Wallenberg St. in Jerusalem

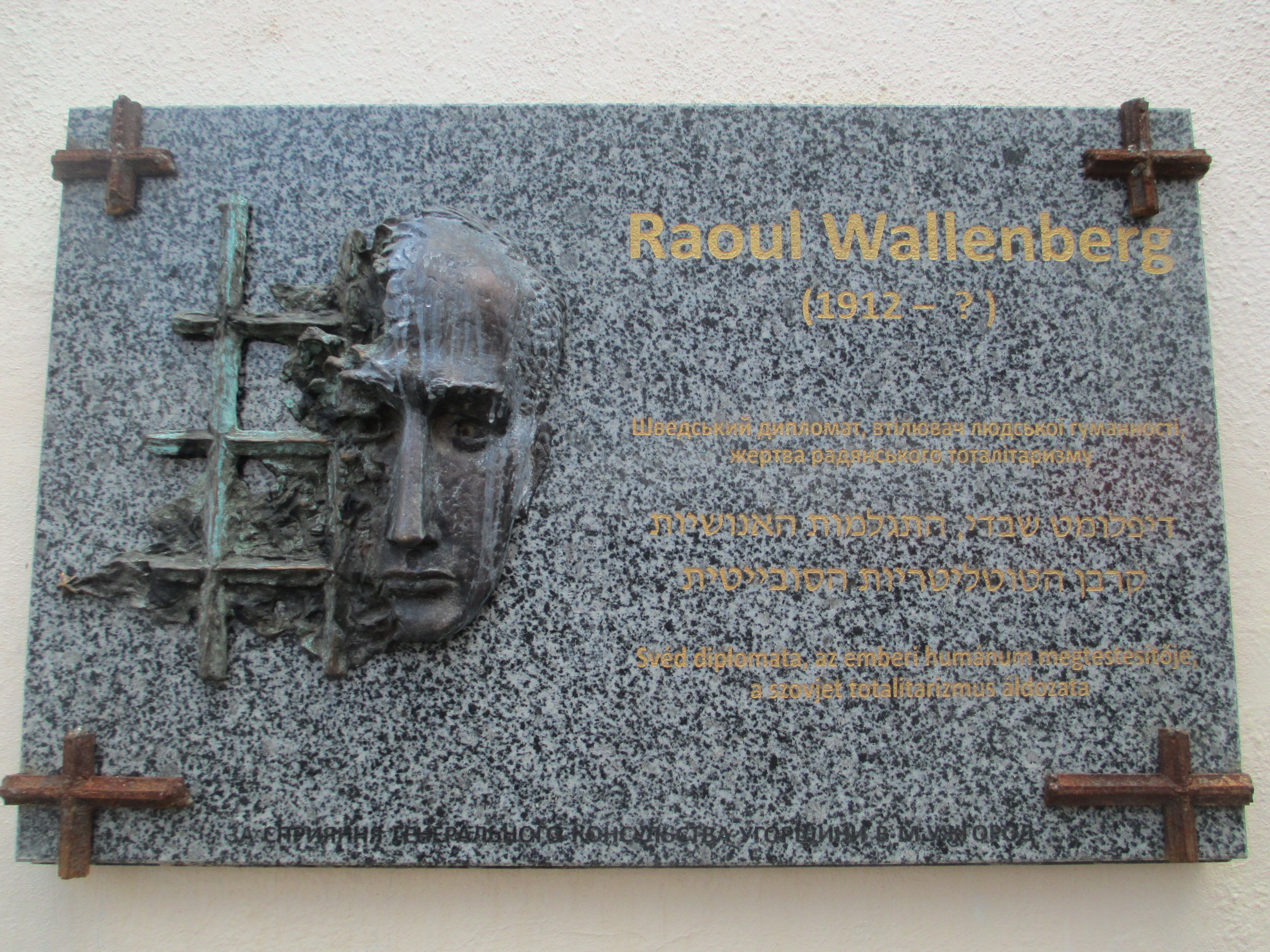
Sign commemorating Raoul Wallenberg in Uzhhorod, Ukraine

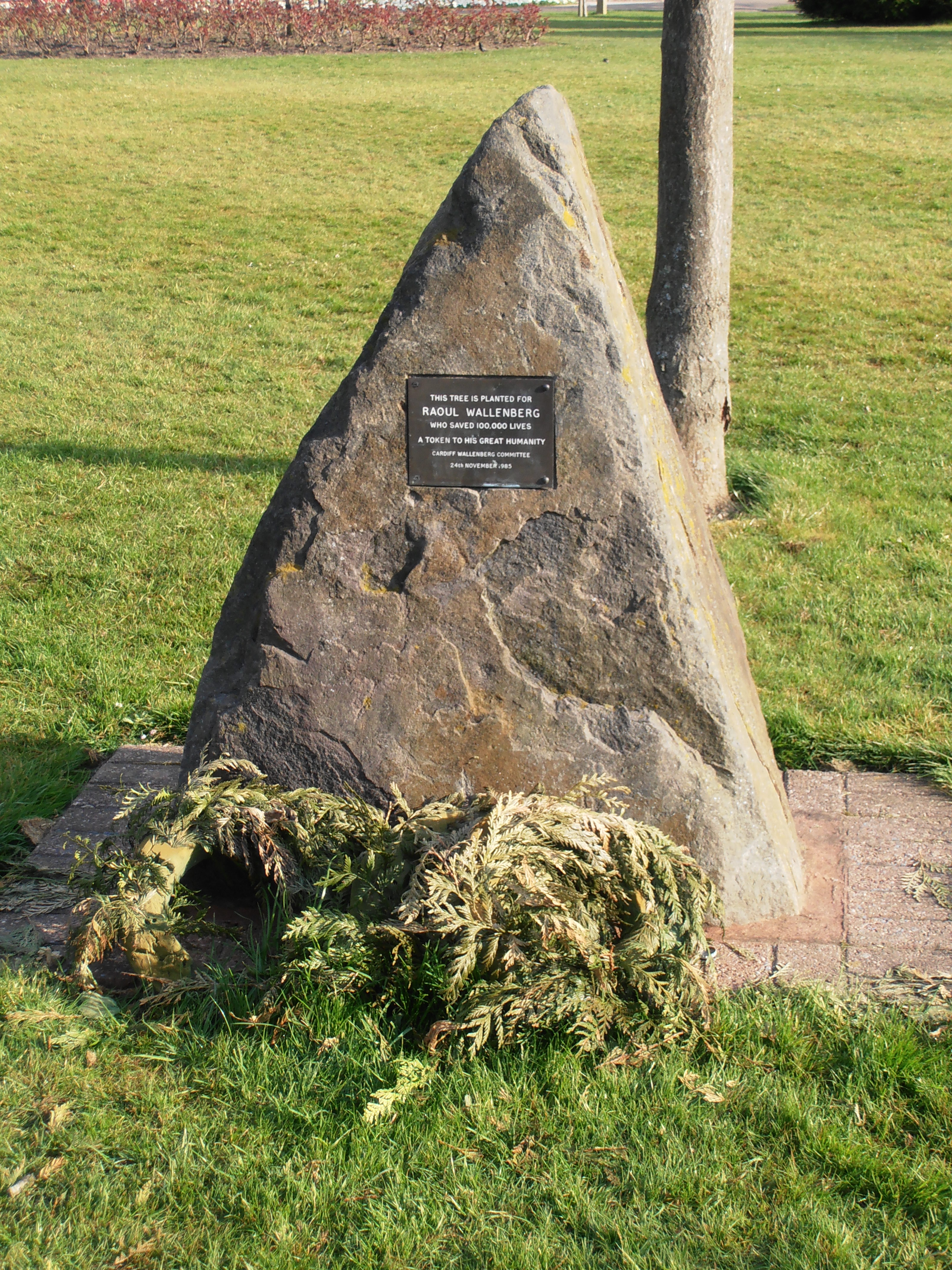
A memorial to Raoul Wallenberg in Cathays Park, Cardiff, United Kingdom.

== Awards in his name ==
The Raoul Wallenberg Committee of the United States bestows the Raoul Wallenberg Award "on individuals, organizations and communities that reflect Raoul Wallenberg's humanitarian spirit, personal courage and nonviolent action in the face of enormous odds".

The University of Michigan awards the Wallenberg Medal annually to outstanding humanitarians who embody the humanitarian values and commitment of its distinguished alumnus. The first Wallenberg Medal was presented in 1990 to Elie Wiesel. The twentieth Wallenberg Medal was awarded in October 2010 to Dr. Denis Mukwege. Recently, the university also established the "Wallenberg Fellowship", which grants students $25,000 to pursue humanitarian projects to better humanity. The university's Taubman College of Architecture and Urban Planning also awards Wallenberg Scholarships to exceptional undergraduate students in their final Senior-Year studio class, which is given to enable students to broaden their study of architecture to include work in distant locations, following Wallenberg's Grandfather's wish for him to be a "citizen of the world". The projects which won the scholarship in recent years addressed Chinese relations, nuclear accident cleanup, and the recent thaw of US-Cuban relations. The Scholarship gives out on average anywhere between $10,000 to $20,000 for travel-related expenses.

The Raoul Wallenberg Academy has created the Raoul Wallenberg Prize, financed by Sweden's Ministry of Employment. In 2013, the jury was chaired by Olle Wästberg, and the award was presented by Minister for Integration Erik Ullenhag. The winner of the 2013 Raoul Wallenberg Award was Siavosh Derakhti, who founded 'Young People against Antisemitism and Xenophobia', an organization dedicated to promoting collaboration and respect for all.

== Schools named after him ==
=== Argentina ===
- Raoul Wallenberg Educational Center

=== Brazil ===
- The Raoul Wallenberg Integral High School

=== Canada ===
- The Anne & Max Tanenbaum Community Hebrew Academy of Toronto Wallenberg Campus
- Wallenberg Academy (formerly Wagar High School), Montreal, Quebec.

=== Ecuador ===
- Raoul Wallenberg Kindergarten & Primary School

=== Germany ===
- Raoul-Wallenberg Schule, Dorsten
- Raoul-Wallenberg-Oberschule, Berlin

=== Hungary ===
- Semmelweis Egyetem Raoul Wallenberg Többcélú Szakképző Intézménye

=== Poland ===
- Raoul Wallenberg Integrated Primary School of Warsaw

=== Sweden ===
- Raoul Wallenberg School Bromma
- Raoul Wallenberg Preschool Bromma
- Raoul Wallenberg Preschool Skövde
- Raoul Wallenberg School Uppsala
- Raoul Wallenberg Institute of Human Rights and Humanitarian Law (Lund University)

=== Uruguay ===
- Raoul Wallenberg Lyceum

=== United States ===
- P.S. 194 Raoul Wallenberg School in Brooklyn, New York
- Raoul Wallenberg Traditional High School in San Francisco

=== Venezuela ===
- Raoul Wallenberg Pre-School Educational Unit
