= Donald Buttress =

British architect

Donald Reeve Buttress LVO OBE FSA is an architect based in St Albans, Hertfordshire. He co-founded the Manchester-based practice Buttress Architects.

From 1988 to 1999 he was Surveyor of the Fabric of Westminster Abbey, and is now Surveyor Emeritus. During his time there he was involved with the completion of the external restoration, particularly the repair of the West Front and the Henry VII Chapel.

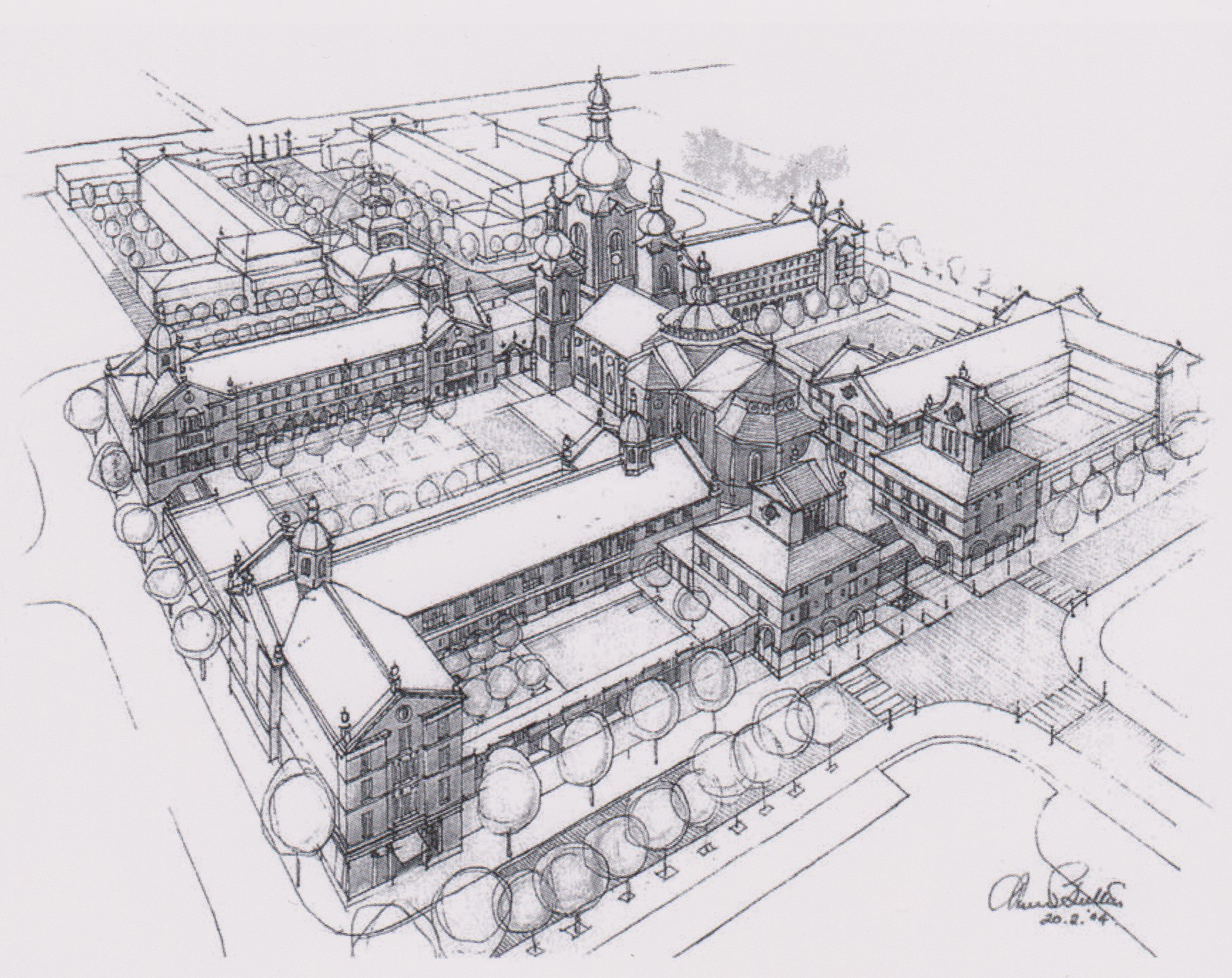
Donald Buttress's original conceptual drawing of the future Piazza that will surround the Cathedral of the Transfiguration in Canada.

Buttress also designed the Queen Mother Memorial on The Mall, London, unveiled in 2009, with sculptures by Philip Jackson, re-built the burnt-down chapel at Tonbridge School, and directed the design of Cathedraltown, a 200-acre town in the city of Markham, Ontario, Canada.

== Awards and honours ==
Buttress was elected a Fellow of the Society of Antiquaries of London (FSA), as well as a Master of the Art Workers' Guild. In the 1997 New Year Honours, he was appointed a Lieutenant of the Royal Victorian Order (LVO), and was further recognised with appointment as an Officer of the Order of the British Empire (OBE) in the 2008 New Year Honours for services to the Conservation of Cathedrals.
