= Raoul Wallenberg Monument, Gothenburg =

Coordinates: 57°41′54″N 11°57′42″E

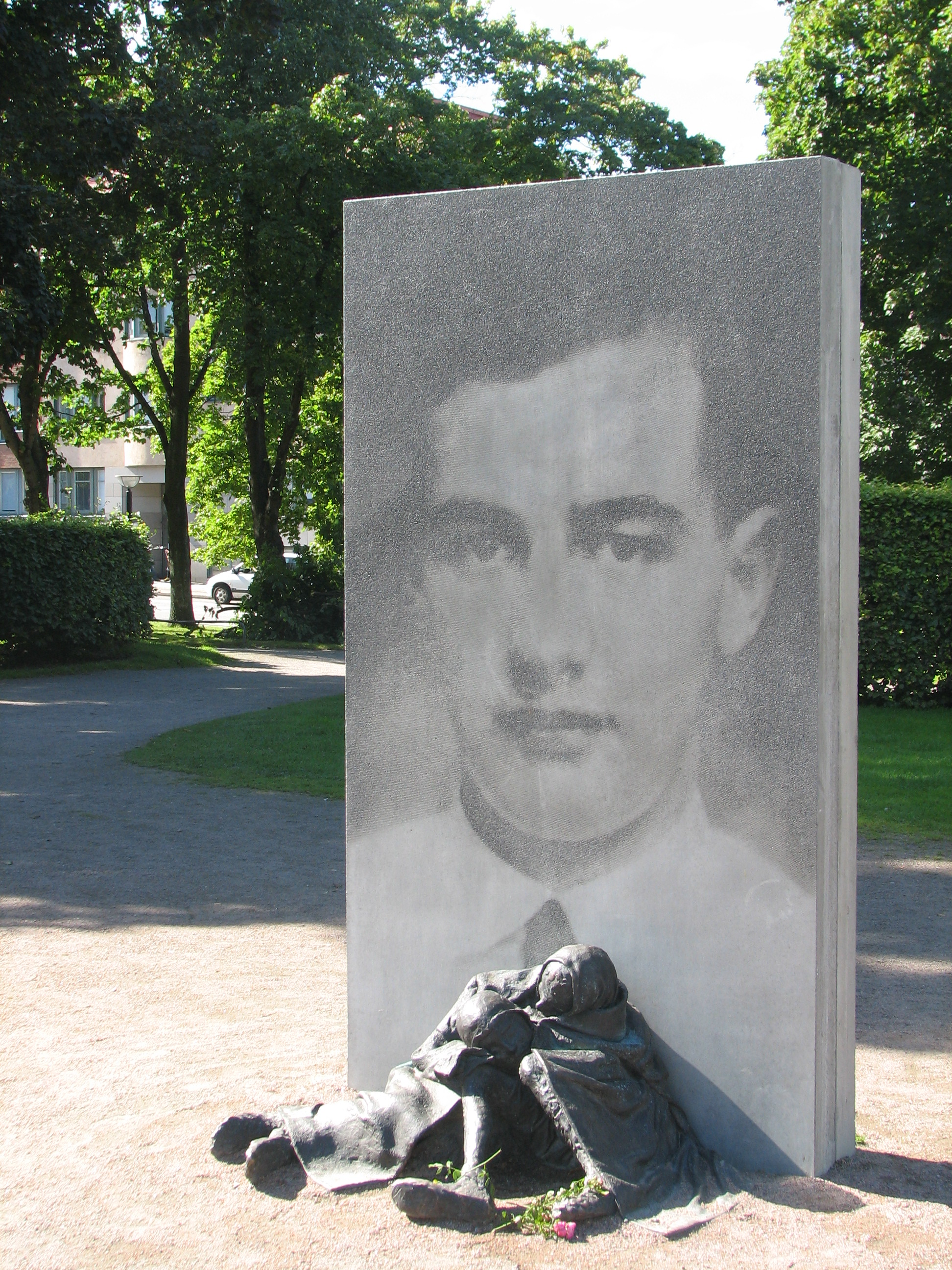
A Memorial to Raoul Wallenberg in the City of Gothenburg

The Raoul Wallenberg Monument, titled In Memory of Raoul Wallenberg's Deed, was erected near the Haga Church (Hagakyrkan) in Gothenburg, Sweden. It is a 2.45 meter high monument, made partly of graphic concrete and partly of bronze, and it was created by Charlotte Gyllenhammar of Stockholm, Sweden. It was unveiled on May 25, 2007 by the UN Secretary-General Kofi Annan.

Charlotte Gyllenhammar's work – which is in the form of a youth portrait of Raoul Wallenberg made on a stone tablet – presents young Raoul Wallenberg, who has not yet met with his fate. A sculpture just in front of the portrait – the concept of which is the testimony to the repressive nature of history – consists of two sleeping boys. There are many other memorials to Raoul Wallenberg in Sweden and around the world.

== See also ==
- List of honours dedicated to Raoul Wallenberg
