= Gurkha Memorial, London =

Memorial in England

Gurkha Memorial
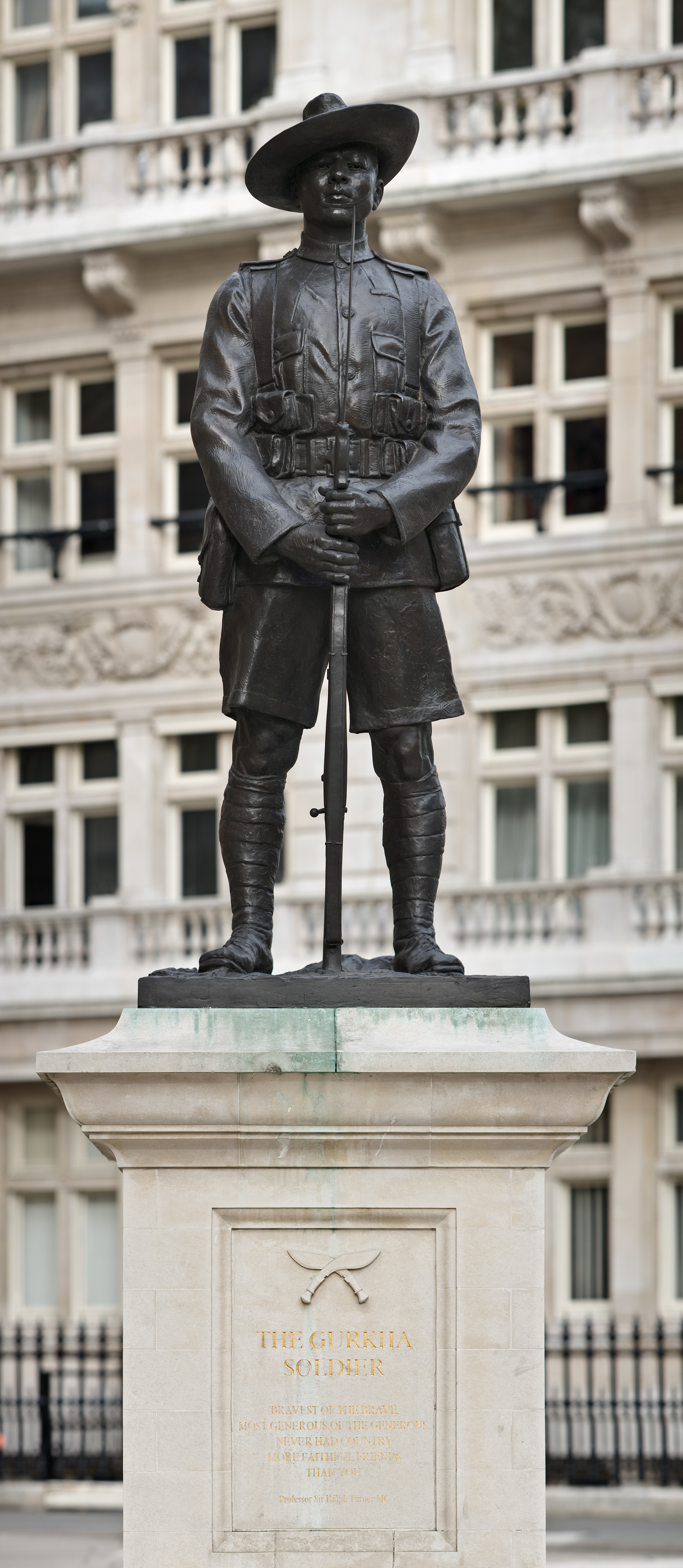
- The memorial in 2008. Whitehall Court is in the background.
- Interactive map of Gurkha Memorial
- Location: London
- Coordinates: 51°30′18″N 0°07′30″W
- Designer: Philip Jackson
- Type: Memorial
- Dedicated date: 3 December 1997
- Dedicated to: Gurkha soldiers in the United Kingdom

The Memorial to the Brigade of Gurkhas on Horse Guards Avenue, Whitehall, London, was unveiled by Queen Elizabeth II on 3 December 1997. This was the first memorial to Gurkha soldiers in the United Kingdom, and was occasioned by transfer of their headquarters and training centre from Hong Kong to London in 1997. The sculptor was Philip Jackson, working from a statue of 1924 by Richard Reginald Goulden in the Foreign and Commonwealth Office, and the plinth was designed by Cecil Denny Highton.

Two casts of Goulden's sculpture had previously been erected in locations in Nepal as World War I memorials to the Gurkhas, the first at Kunraghat in 1928 and the second at Birpur in 1930. The memorial in London is more than one and a half times the size of this model, so Jackson worked the figure up in his own style and from a living model, Captain Khemkumar Limbu. One of several inscriptions on the plinth is a quotation from Sir Ralph Lilley Turner, a former officer in the 3rd Gurkha Rifles.

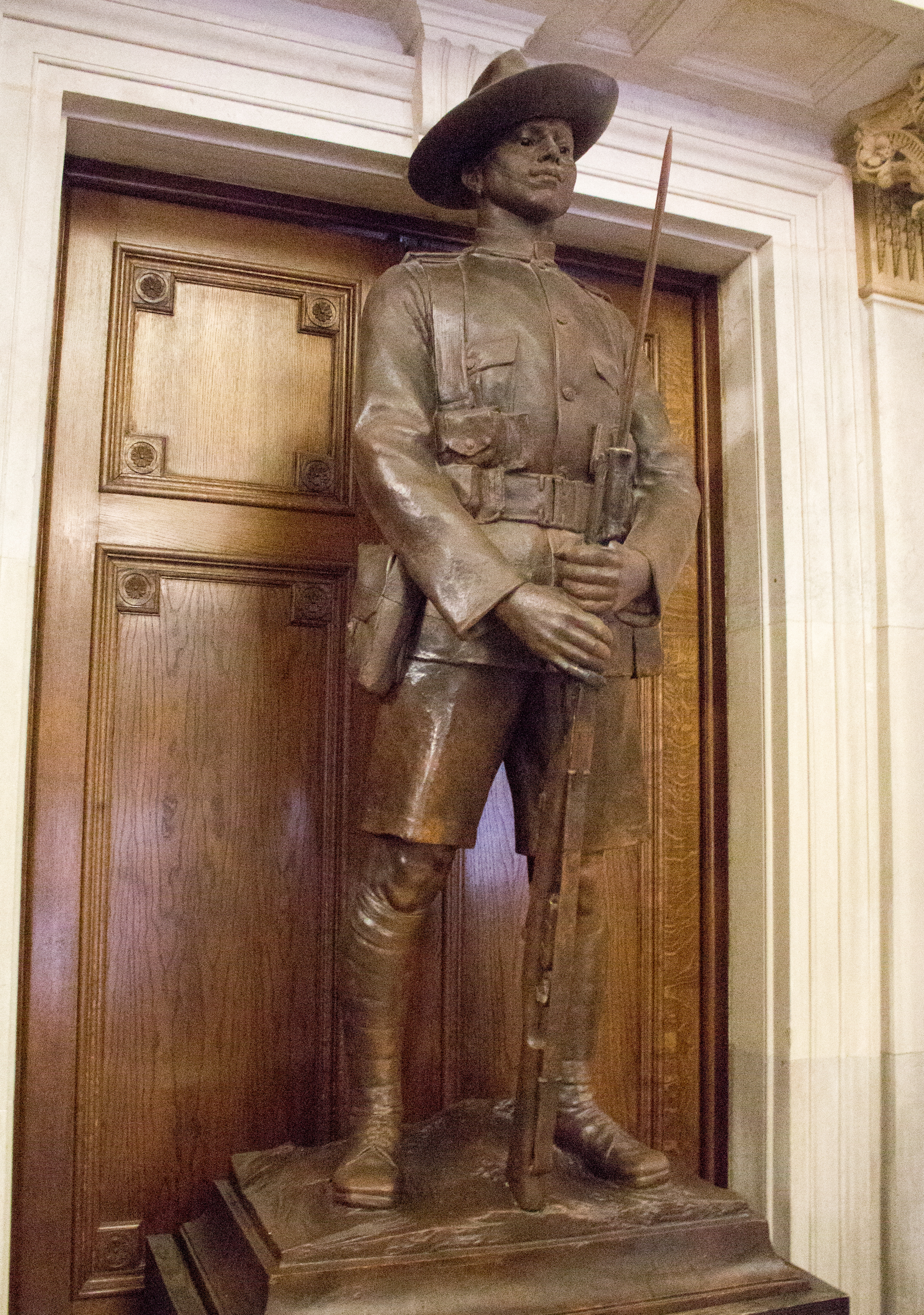
Richard Reginald Goulden's original at the Foreign Office

Inscription by Sir Ralph Turner

== Inscriptions ==
The Inscription

THE GURKHA
SOLDIER
Bravest of the brave,
most generous of the generous,
never had country
more faithful friends
than you.

— Professor Sir Ralph Lilley Turner MC
Regiments text

1st King George V's Own Gurkha Riflles
(The Malaun Regiment)
2nd King Edward VII's Own Gurkha Rifles
(The Sirmoor Rifles)
3rd Queen Alexandra's Own Gurkha Rifles
4th Prince of Wales's Own Gurkha Rifles
5th Royal Gurkha Rifles (Frontier Force)
6th Queen Elizabeth's Own Gurkha Rifles
7th Duke of Edinburgh's Own Gurkha Rifles
8th Gurkha Rifles
9th Gurkha Rifles
10th Princess Mary's Own Gurkha Rifles
11th Gurkha Rifles
The Royal Gurkha Rifles
The Queen's Gurkha Engineers
Queen's Gurkha Signals
Gurkha Military Police
The Queen's Own Gurkha Transport Regiment

Other units in which Gurkha soldiers served after 1815
and also the units of the Royal Nepalese Army
which, as Britain's allies, took part in the Indian Mutiny
and the First and Second World Wars.

Campaign Services text

India 1816–1826
North East Frontier and Burma 1824–1939
First Sikh War 1845–1846
North West Frontier 1852–1947
Indian Mutiny 1857–1859
Bhutan 1864–1866
Malaya 1875–1876
Second Afghan War 1878–1880
Sikkim 1888
China 1900
Tibet 1904
Third Afghan War 1919
Kurdustan 1919
Iraq 1919–1920
North West Persia 1920
Malabar 1921–1922
Palestine 1945–1946
Java and Sumatra 1945–1946
Indo-China 1945–1946
Malaya 1948–1960
Brunei 1962
Borneo 1963–1966
Malay Peninsula 1964–1965
Falkland Islands 1982
The Gulf 1990–1991
Bosnia 1996

Battle Honours text

FIRST WORLD WAR
1914–1918
France and Belgium
Gallipoli
Egypt and Palestine
Mesopotamia

SECOND WORLD WAR
1939–1945
North Africa
Italy
Greece
Persia, Iraq and Syria
Malaya and Singapore
Burma

== See also ==
- 1997 in art
- Brigade of Gurkhas
