= Raoul Wallenberg Monument, London =

Monument by Philip Jackson

Coordinates: 51°30′54.01″N 0°9′34.65″W

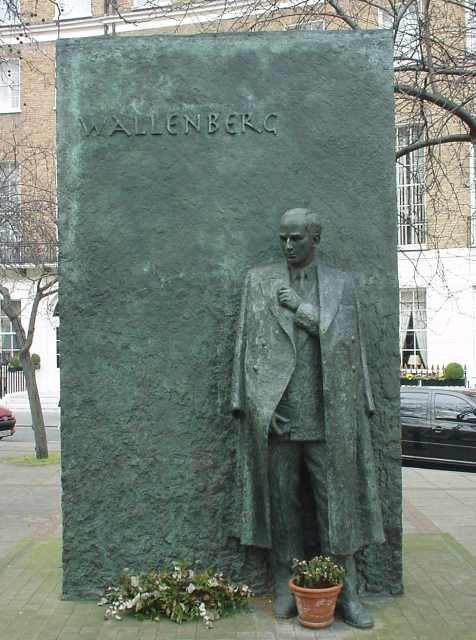
The Wallenberg Memorial in 2005.

A monument to Raoul Wallenberg stands at Great Cumberland Place in London's Marble Arch district, outside the Western Marble Arch Synagogue and near the Swedish Embassy. The 10 ft bronze monument was sculpted by Philip Jackson and is a larger-than-life representation of Wallenberg, standing against a bronze wall made up of 100,000 Schutzpässe, the protective passes used by Wallenberg to rescue Hungarian Jews.

The monument was unveiled by Queen Elizabeth II on 26 February 1997, in a ceremony attended by the President of Israel, Ezer Weizman, the Secretary General of the United Nations, Kofi Annan, and survivors of the Holocaust. Annan also gave a speech at the ceremony. The statue was unveiled during the second day of Weizman's state visit to the United Kingdom. The ceremony was also attended by Sigmund Sternberg, Chairman of the Executive Committee of the Wallenberg Appeal and Robert Davis, the Lord Mayor of Westminster.

The statue was described as a monument at the time of its unveiling rather than a memorial, as Wallenberg's family believed that there was no evidence for his death. Wallenberg would have been aged 84 in 1997.

A second British monument to Wallenberg stands near the Welsh National War Memorial in Alexandra Gardens, in Cardiff, Wales.
