= King George VI and Queen Elizabeth Memorial =

Memorial in London

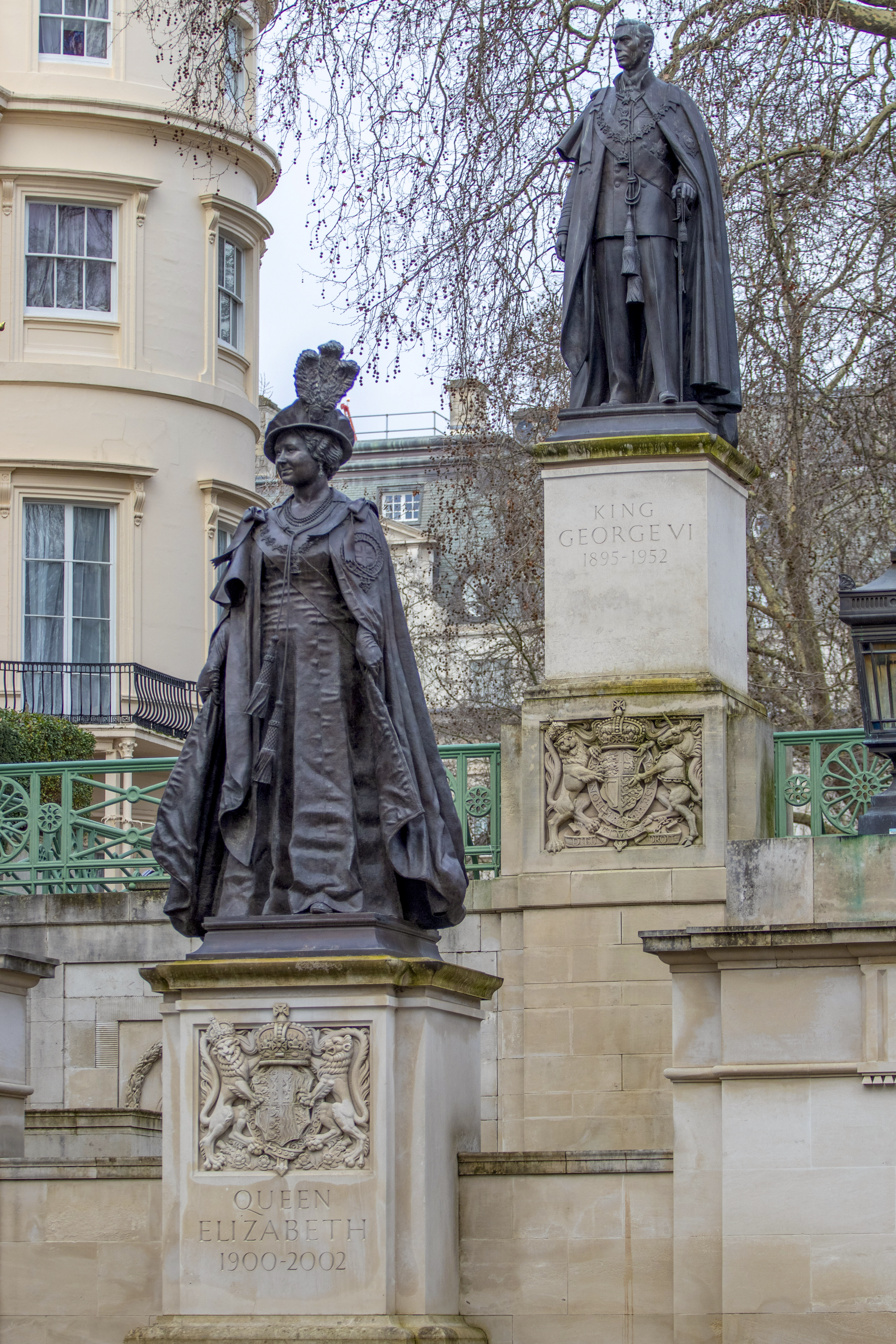
- The statues in 2026
- Interactive map of King George VI and Queen Elizabeth Memorial
- Location: London
- Coordinates: 51°30′19″N 0°08′01″W
- Designer: William McMillan (statue of King George VI); Philip Jackson (statue of Queen Elizabeth); Paul Day (relief sculpture); Donald Buttress and Donald Insall (architectural setting)
- Type: Memorial
- Material: Bronze
- Opening date: 1955 (statue of King George VI); 2009 (statue of Queen Elizabeth)
- Dedicated to: King George VI and Queen Elizabeth the Queen Mother

The King George VI and Queen Elizabeth Memorial, situated between The Mall and Carlton Gardens in central London, is a memorial to King George VI and his consort, Queen Elizabeth (later the Queen Mother). Completed in its present form in 2009, the memorial incorporates an earlier, Grade II listed statue of George VI by William McMillan, unveiled by his daughter Queen Elizabeth II in 1955. The reconfigured memorial, which includes a statue of the Queen Mother by Philip Jackson, relief sculpture by Paul Day and an architectural setting by Donald Buttress and Donald Insall, was unveiled by Queen Elizabeth II in 2009.

== Statue of King George VI ==
The statue of King George VI was sculpted in bronze by William McMillan, and depicts him in his naval uniform. The statue stands on a base of Portland stone. The statue was unveiled by Elizabeth II in the presence of her mother and other senior members of the royal family. The architect of the memorial was Louis de Soissons. It was feared that the location of the memorial would aesthetically disrupt The Mall, adding a further set of steps so near to the Duke of York Column, but it was positively received upon unveiling on 6 October 1955.

The statue was designated a Grade II listed building on 9 January 1970.

== Statue of Queen Elizabeth ==
The statue of Queen Elizabeth was sculpted in bronze by Philip Jackson, and portrays her at the time that she was widowed, aged 51. The memorial to Queen Elizabeth cost £2 million, and was funded by a special five-pound coin produced to mark Queen Elizabeth II's 80th birthday.

There are also two large bronze relief panels by Paul Day, depicting George and Elizabeth's life together and Elizabeth's years as a widow. Donald Buttress's proposal to modify the setting was approved in combination with elements from Donald Insall's design to create space for Elizabeth's statue to be installed.

A second casting of the statue was unveiled in Queen Mother Square, Poundbury, Dorset, on 27 October 2016.

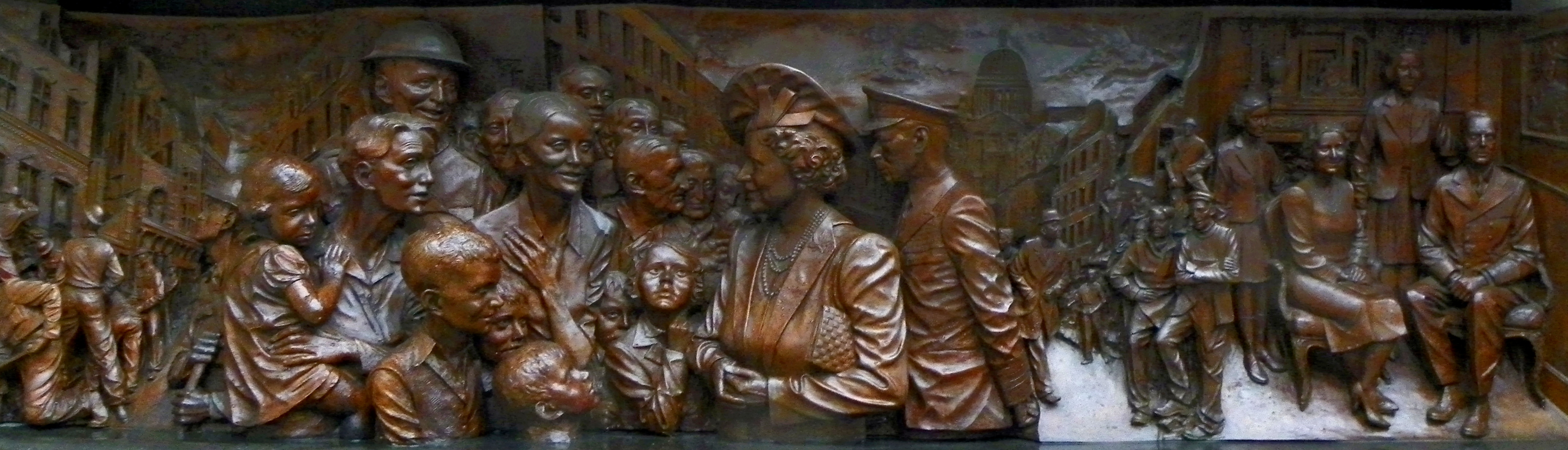
The bronze panel to the left side of the memorial when viewed from The Mall

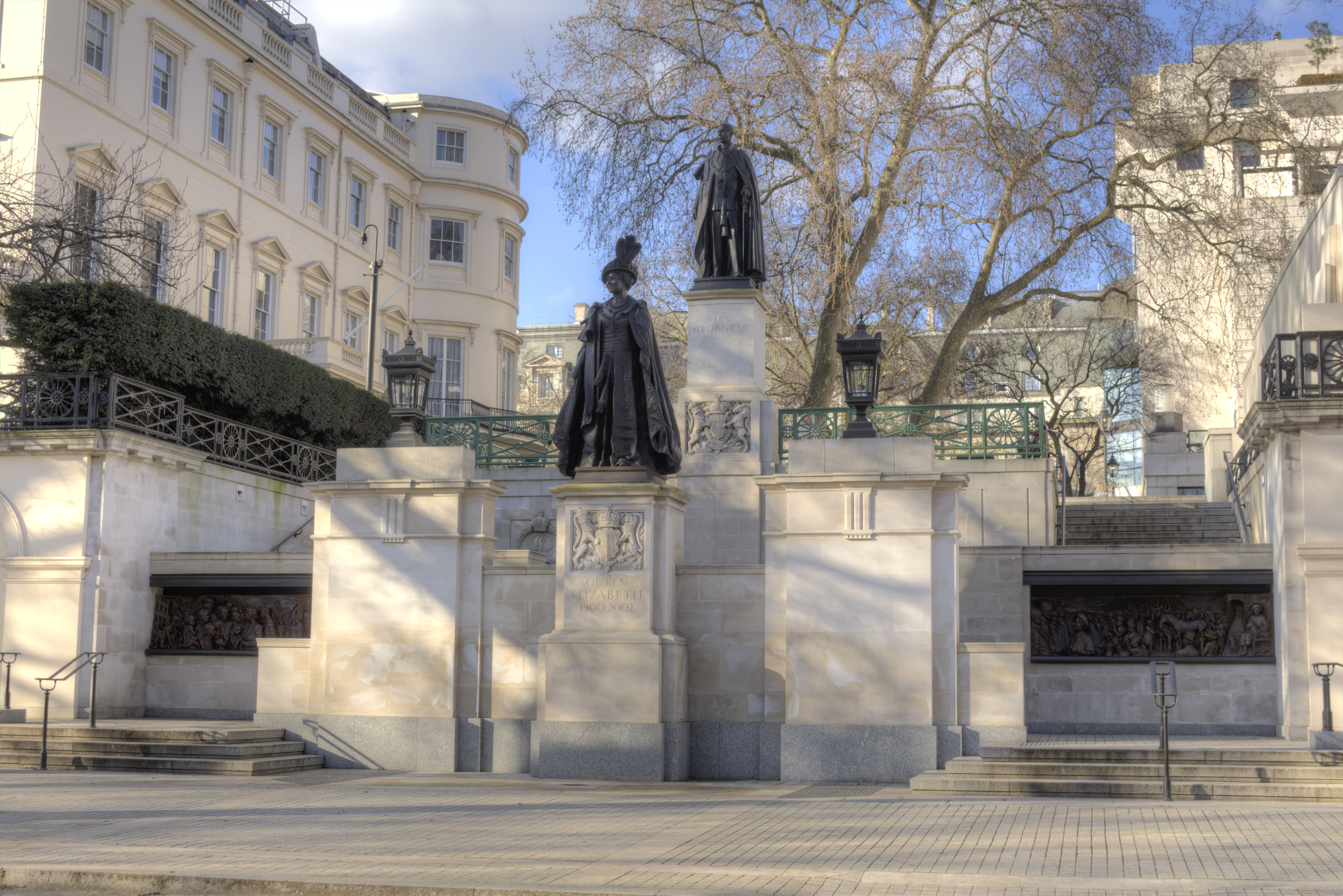
The full memorial viewed from The Mall

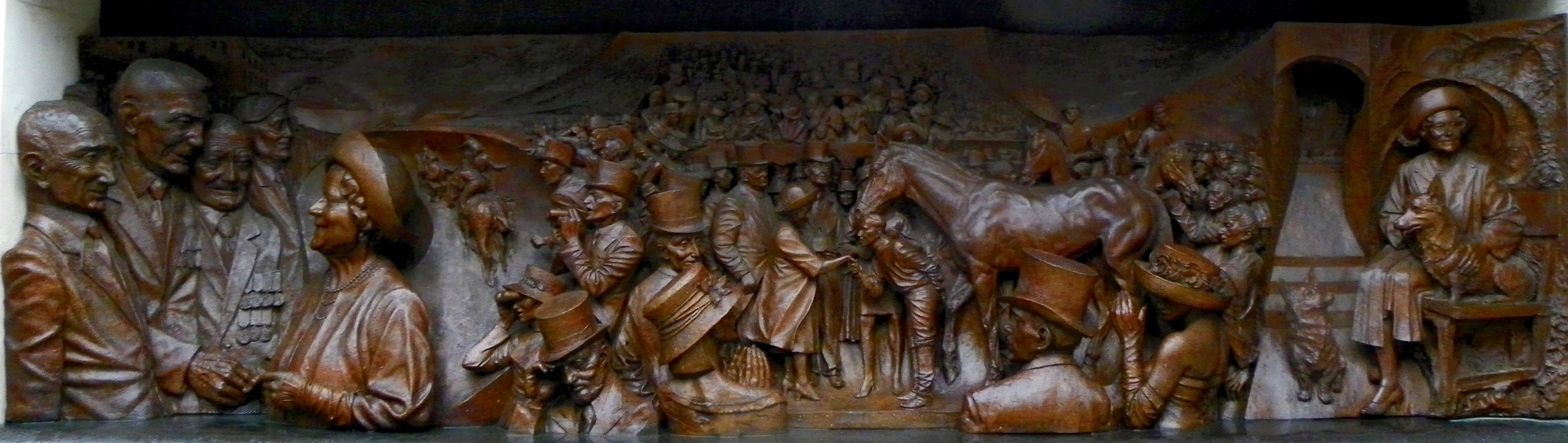
The bronze panel to the right side of the memorial when viewed from The Mall
