= Philip Jackson (sculptor) =

Scottish sculptor (born 1944)

Philip Henry Christopher Jackson CVO DL (born 18 April 1944) is a Scottish sculptor, noted for his modern style and emphasis on form. Acting as Royal Sculptor to Queen Elizabeth II, his sculptures appear in numerous UK cities, as well as Argentina and Switzerland.

His twice life-size (6 metre tall) bronze statue of Bobby Moore was erected outside the main entrance at Wembley Stadium in 2007 to pay tribute to his effect on football.

== Life ==
Jackson was born in Scotland during the Second World War and now works at the Edward Lawrence Studio in Midhurst, West Sussex and lives nearby. He went to the Farnham School of Art (now the University for the Creative Arts). After leaving school, he was a press photographer for a year and then joined a design company as a sculptor. Half of his time is spent on commissions and the other half on his gallery sculpture. He is well known for his major outdoor pieces, such as the Young Mozart in Chelsea and the Jersey Liberation sculpture. His sources of inspiration have been Jacob Epstein, Auguste Rodin, Henry Moore, Oscar Nemon and Kenneth Armitage. But the most powerful influences in his life are his wife Jean and son Jamie who work with him.

Jackson describes his art in the following words:

My sculptures are essentially an impressionistic rendering of the figure. Where you see the figure seemingly grow out of the ground, the texture resembles tree bark, rock, or lava flow. As the eye moves up the sculpture, the finish becomes gentler & more delicately worked, culminating in the hands and the mask, both of which are precisely observed & modelled.

Jackson lives in Cocking, West Sussex, where his garden and sculptures are occasionally open to the public.

== Honours ==
Jackson was appointed Commander of the Royal Victorian Order (CVO) in the 2009 Birthday Honours list.

He was awarded an honorary MA by the University of Chichester in 2004.

On 1 April 2008, Jackson was appointed a Deputy Lieutenant of West Sussex.

His work on the RAF Bomber Command Memorial won him the 2013 Marsh Award for Excellence in Public Sculpture.

== Commissions ==
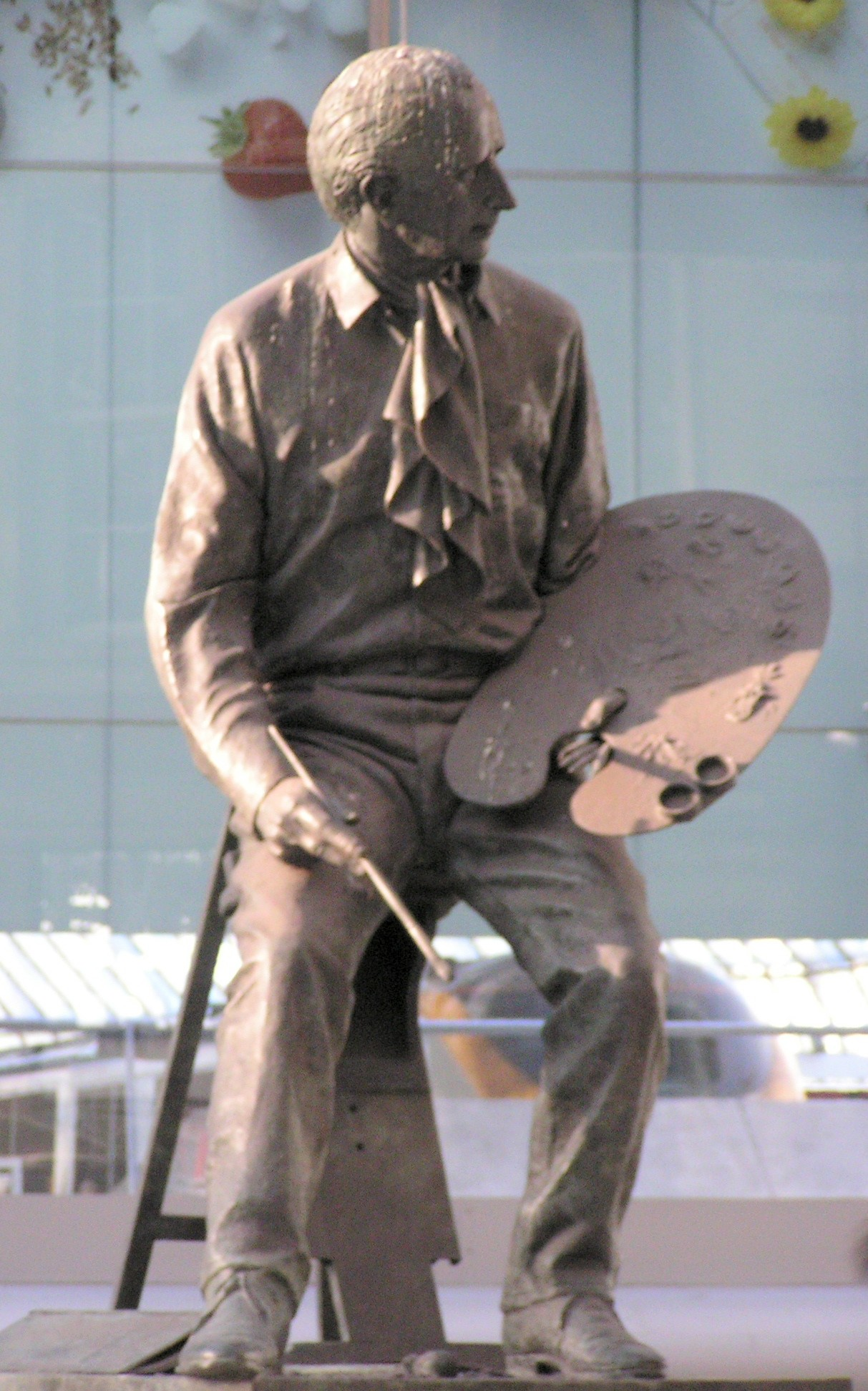
Statue of Terence Cuneo, Waterloo station, London.

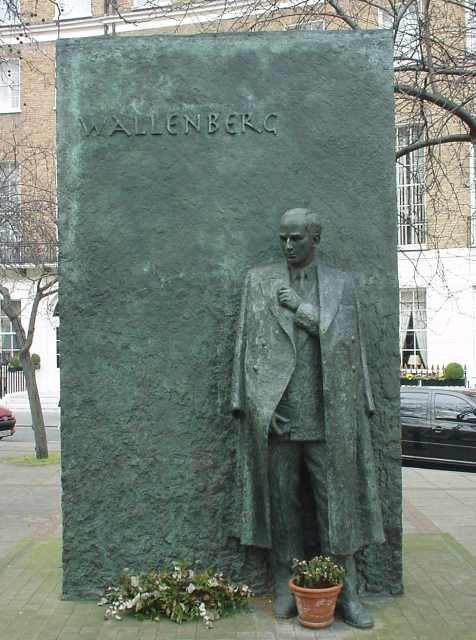
Raoul Wallenberg Monument in Great Cumberland Place, London

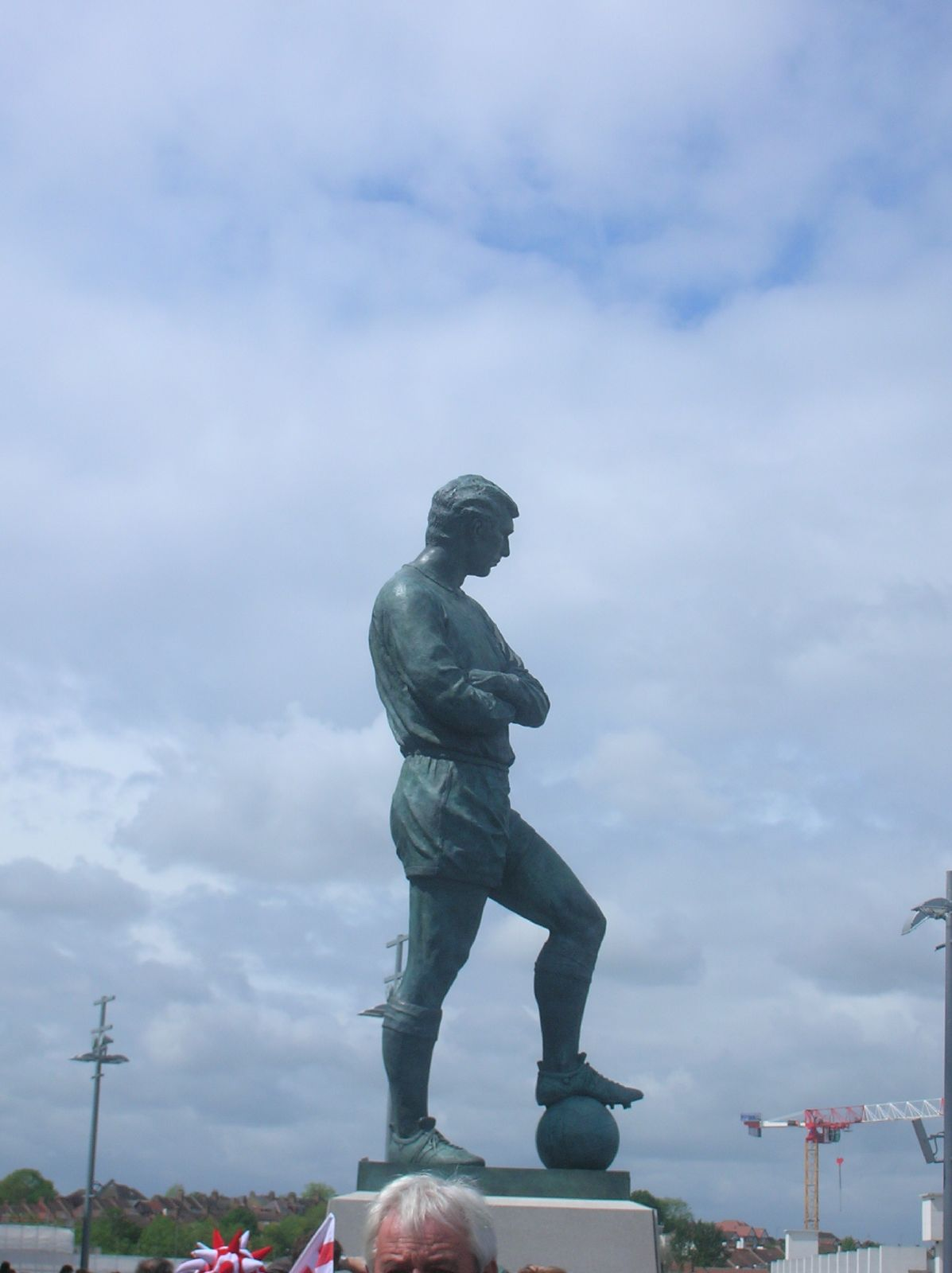
Bobby Moore statue, Wembley

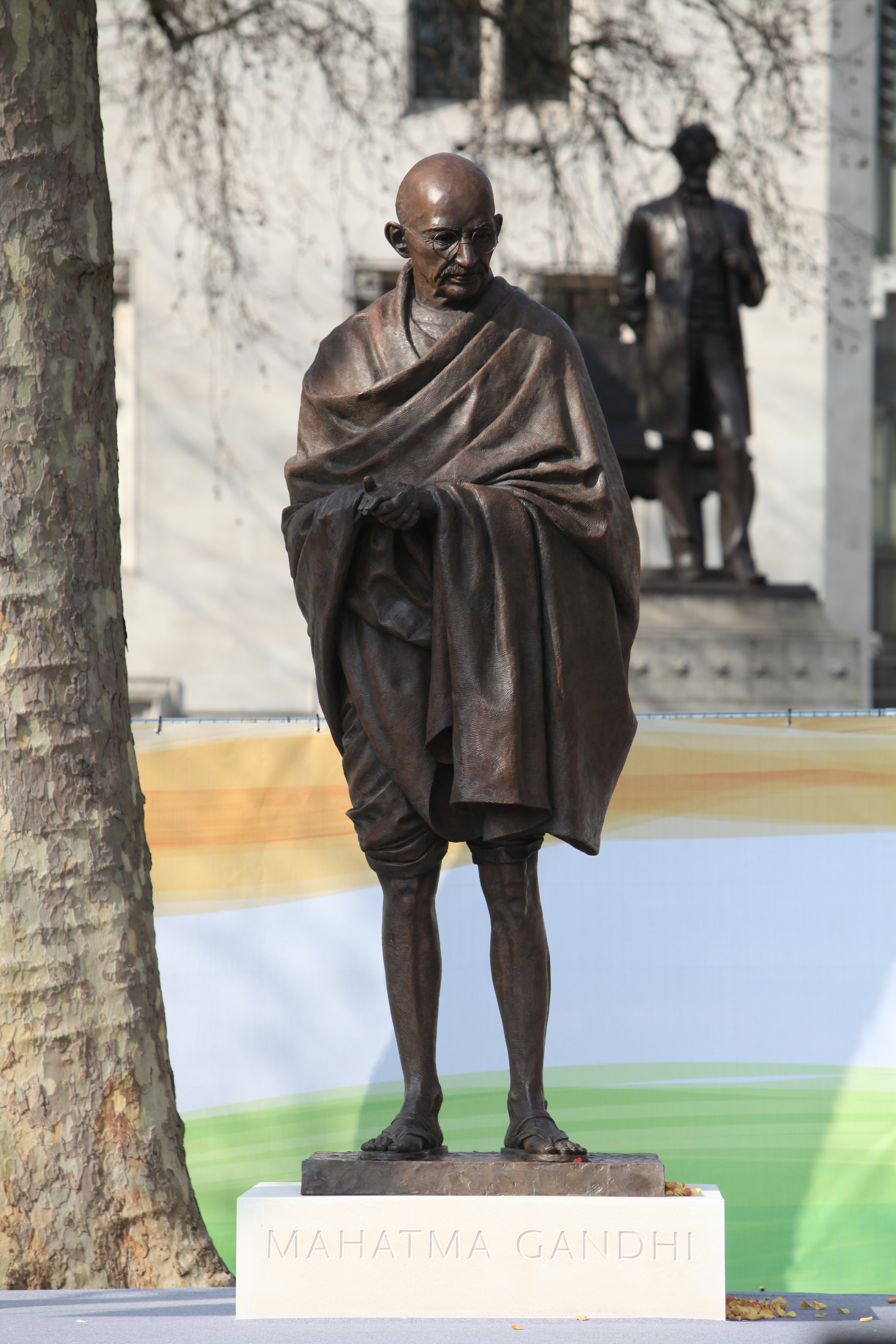
Mahatma Gandhi, Parliament Square, London

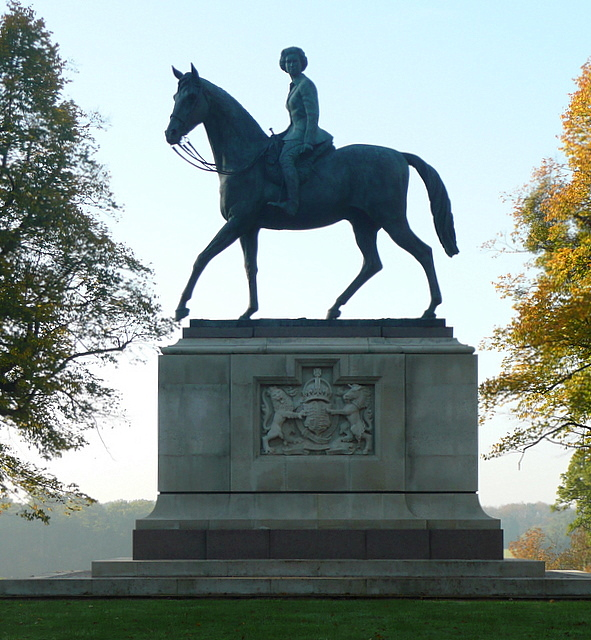
Equestrian statue of Elizabeth II, Windsor Great Park

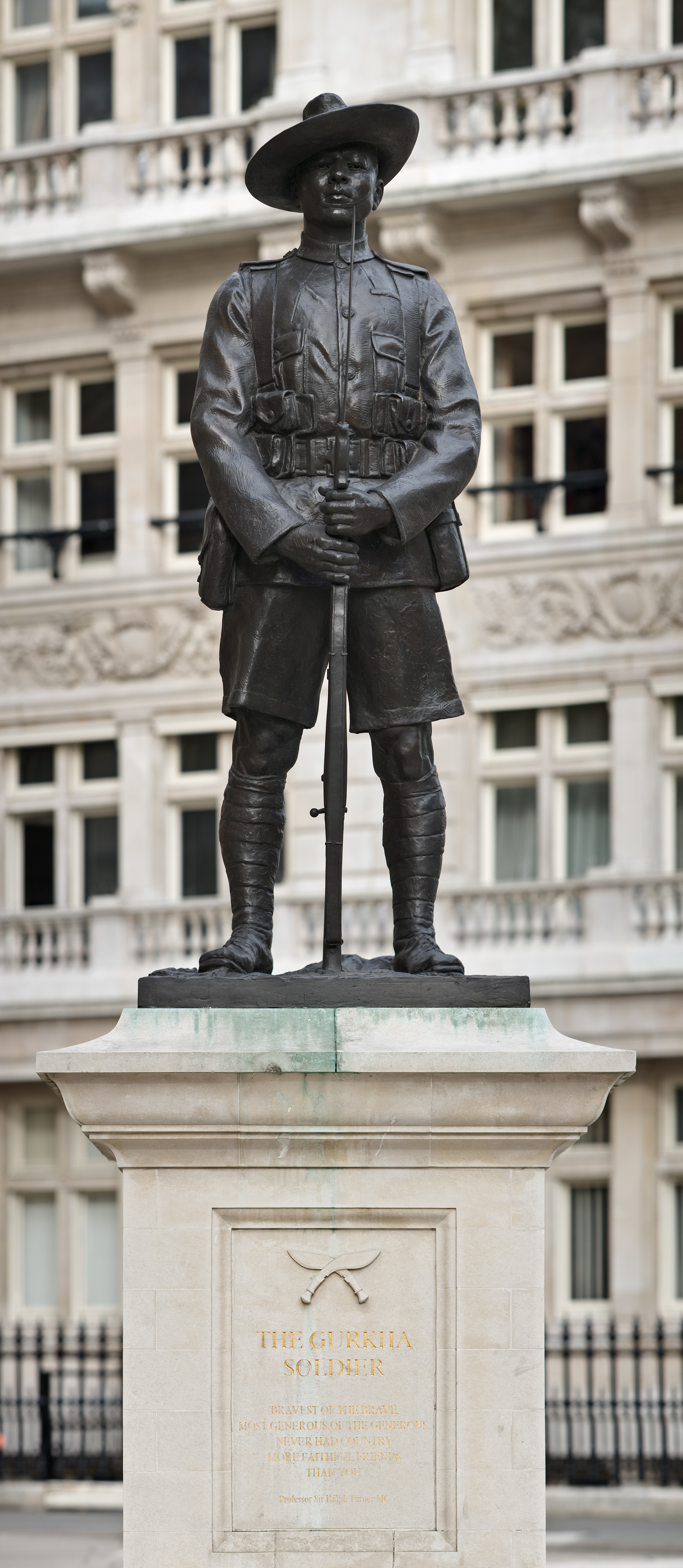
Gurkha Soldier Monument, London
- Wolfgang Amadeus Mozart – Belgravia, London
- Falklands War Sculpture – Portsmouth
- Liberation Sculpture – Jersey, Channel Islands
- Sir Matt Busby – Old Trafford, Manchester
- Empress Elisabeth of Austria – Geneva, Switzerland
- St Richard – Chichester Cathedral
- King George VI – Britannia Royal Naval College, Dartmouth
- The Gurka Memorial – Horse Guards Avenue
- 1966 World Cup Sculpture – Newham, London
- Queen Elizabeth II – Windsor Great Park
- Queen Elizabeth the Queen Mother – London
- Bobby Moore and Sir Alf Ramsey – Wembley Stadium, London
- United Trinity – Old Trafford, Manchester
- Sir Alex Ferguson – Old Trafford, Manchester
- Peter Osgood – Stamford Bridge, Fulham
- Korean War Memorial – London
- Statue of Constantine the Great, York
- RAF Bomber Command Memorial – London

As well as producing commissions, Jackson also creates 'studio' works, mainly theatrical subjects. One of his most celebrated works was the life-size nude, Maggie Reading.

It was announced on 6 September 2019 that Jackson had been commissioned to build the National Emergency Services Memorial which was being backed by the Duke of Cambridge and prime minister Boris Johnson.
