= Haga Church =

Church of Sweden

Coordinates: 57°41′56.5″N 11°57′44.2″E

- Hagakyrkan
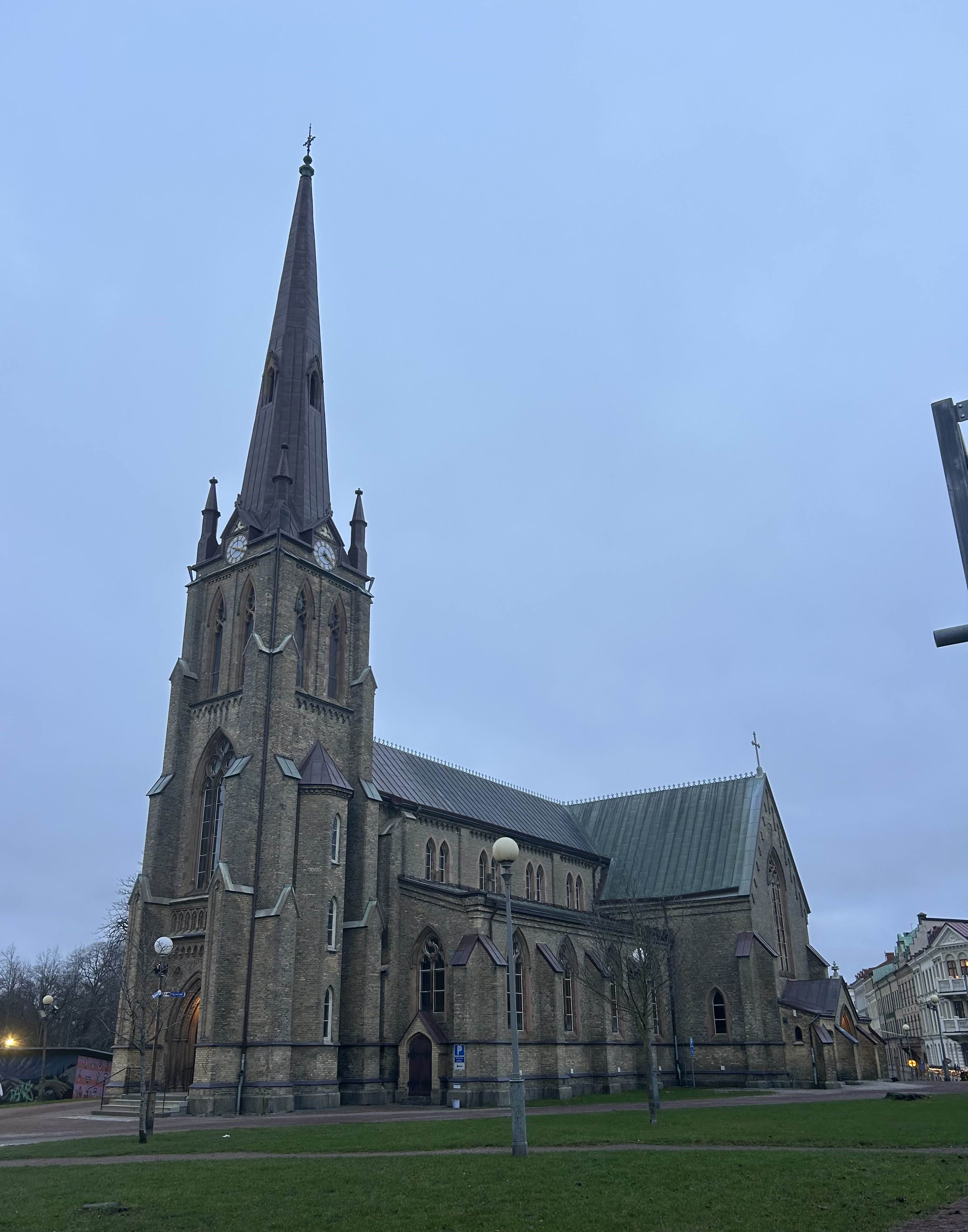
- The Haga Church
- Haga Church
- Location: Gothenburg
- Country: Sweden
- Denomination: Church of Sweden

History
- Consecrated: 27 November 1859

Administration
- Diocese: Gothenburg
- Parish: Gothenburg Haga

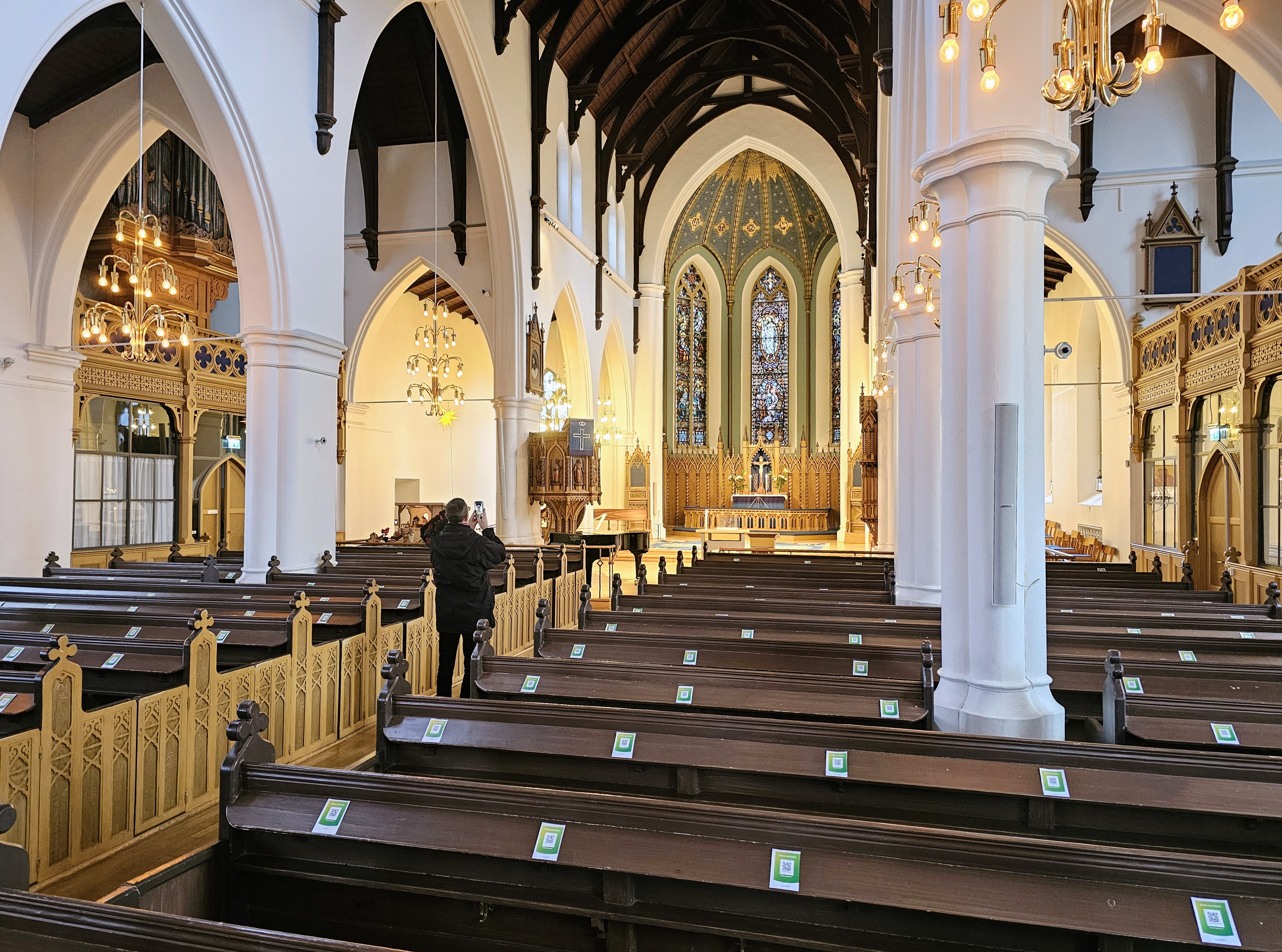
Interior

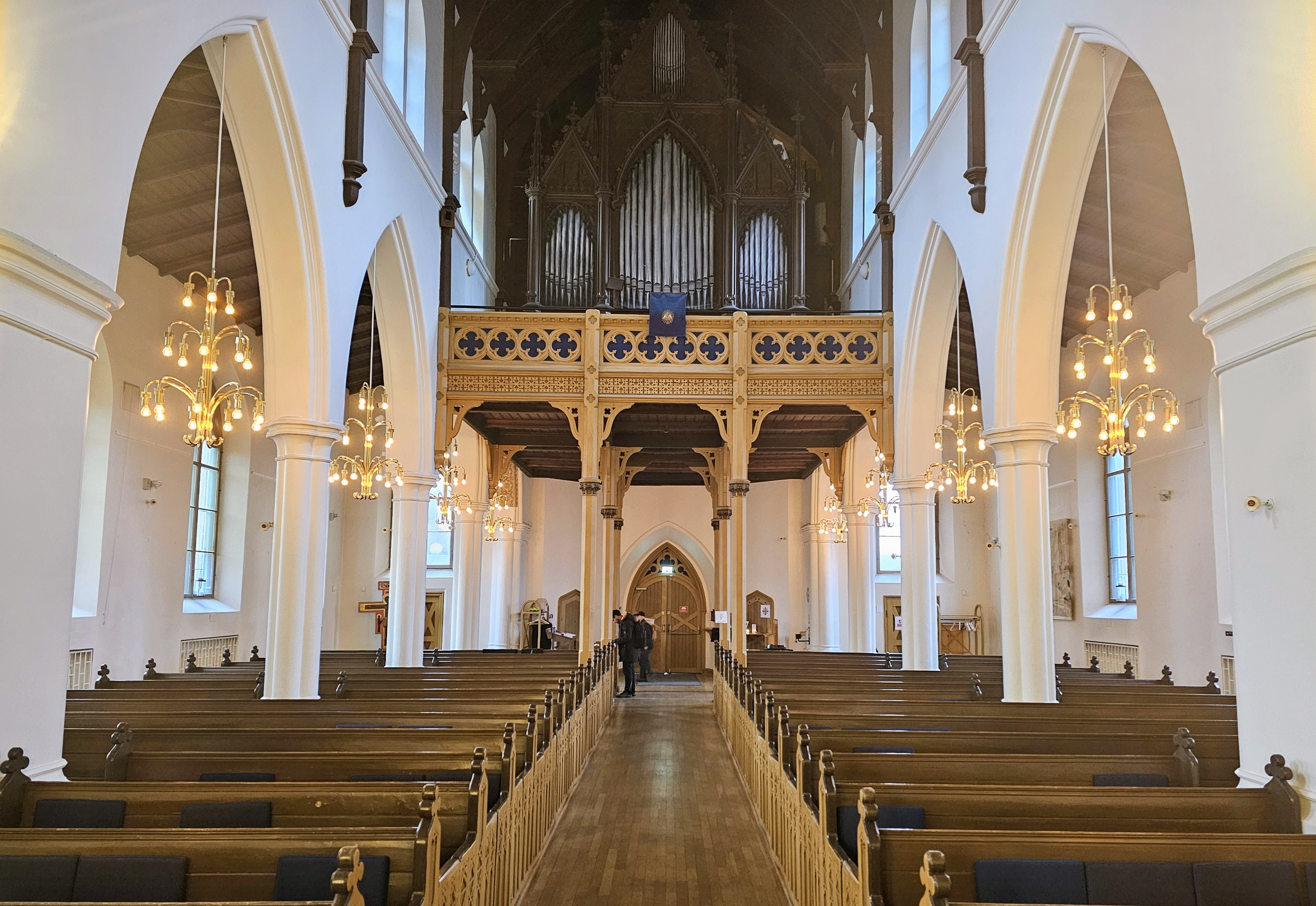
Main organ

The Haga Church is a church building located in Gothenburg, Sweden. Belonging to the Gothenburg Haga Parish within the Diocese of Gothenburg of the Church of Sweden, it was opened on Advent Sunday, 27 November 1859.

Construction of the church began in 1856. The church and also the pulpit was designed by architect Adolf W. Edelsvärd.

The bell tower of the church is about 50 meters high.

== Organs and organists ==
The first organ was installed in 1861 by the Danish firm Marcussen & Søn for the price of 20 000 Swedish crowns. It was rebuilt in 1911 (pneumatic action) and 1945–1951 (electric action) by the Magnusson organ building firm. It was restored to close to original condition 2002–2004 by Åkerman & Lund.

The first organist of the church was Per Johan Ållander who was hired in 1861 and the first cantor was Carl H Olsson who was hired 1863.

A meantone organ by John Brombaugh was installed in the north balcony in 1991–1992.
