= Spire Memorial =

Spire Memorial may refer to:

- The Bomber Command Spire Memorial, a spire erected in memory of the men of the RAF's Bomber Command near the English city of Lincoln
- The Kaiser Wilhelm Memorial Church, the spire of a bombed out church in the German city of Berlin that has been retained as a memorial
