= Angel of the North =

Sculpture by Antony Gormley in northern England

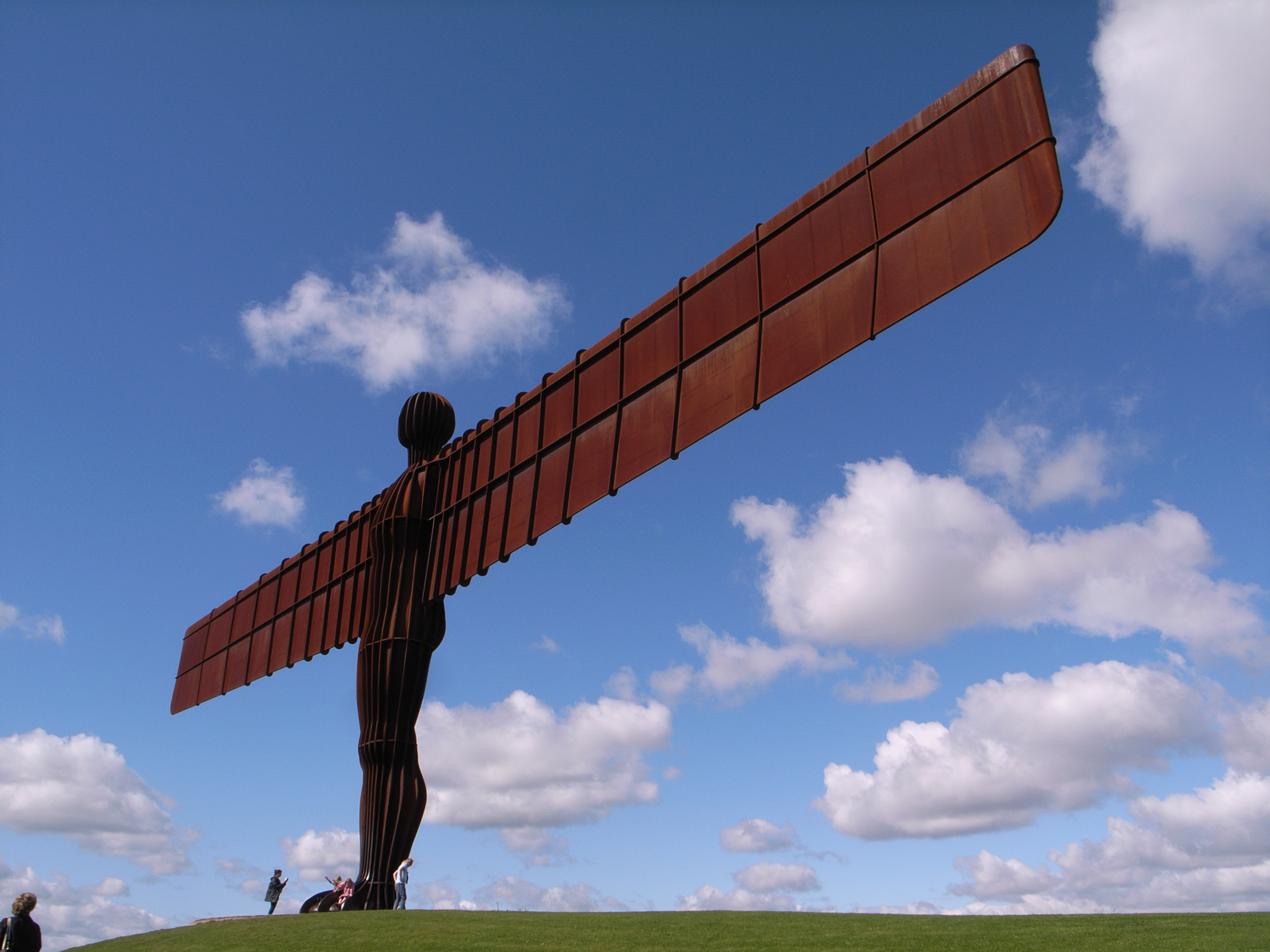
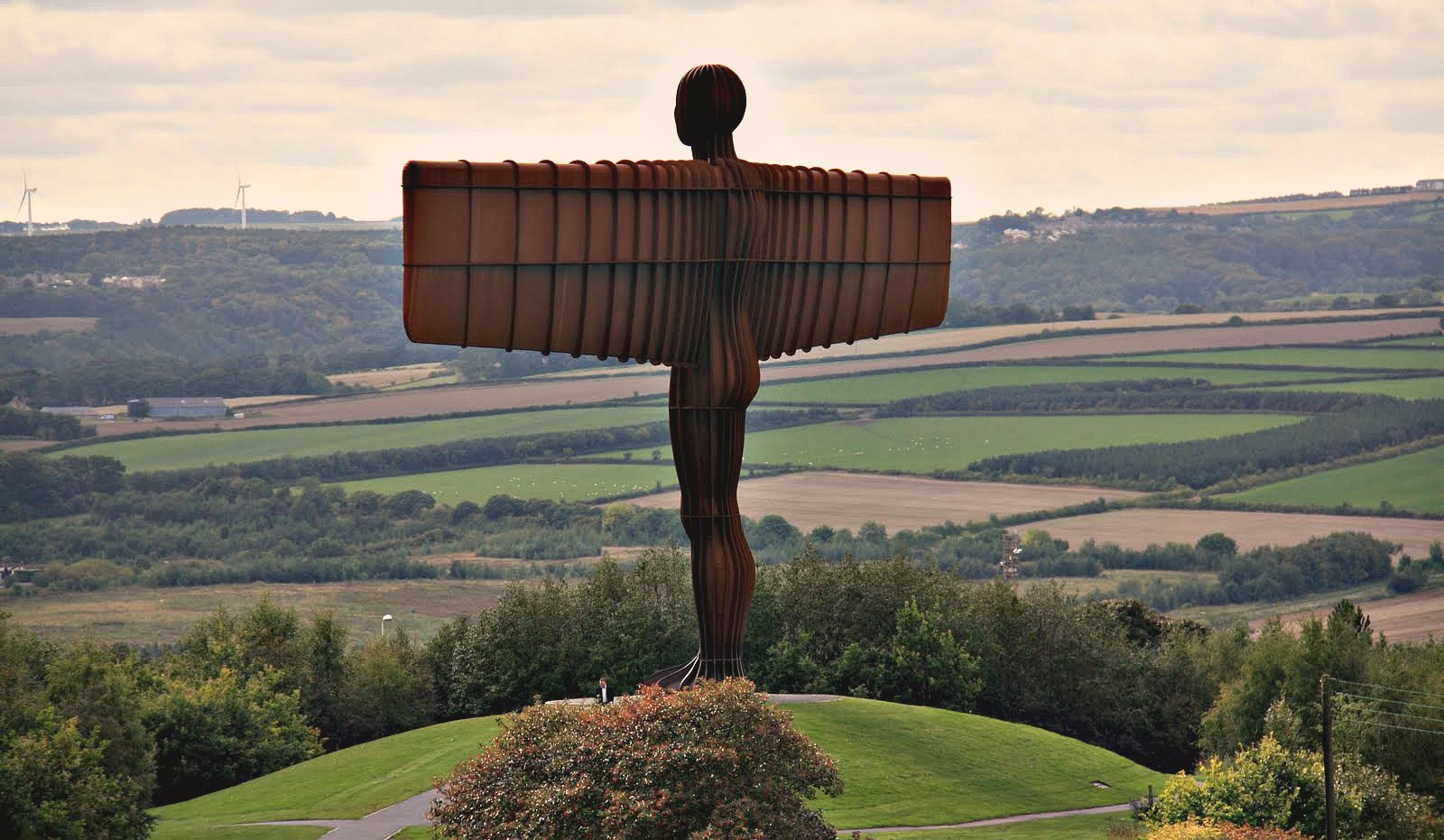
- Above: Front view. Below: Rear view within the surrounding landscape.

- Location within Tyne and Wear

General information
- Type: Artwork
- Location: Lamesley, Gateshead, NE9
- Coordinates: 54.9141°N 1.5895°W
- Elevation: 75 metres (246.1 ft)
- Construction started: 1994
- Completed: 15 February 1998
- Cost: £800,000 (equivalent to about £1,550,000 in 2025)

Height
- Height: 20 metres (65.6 ft)

Dimensions
- Weight: 208 tonnes
- Other dimensions: 54 metres (177 ft) wing span; 6.2 metres (20 ft) wing height at shoulder

Technical details
- Material: Weathering steel

Design and construction
- Architect: Antony Gormley
- Structural engineer: Ove Arup & Partners
- Main contractor: Hartlepool Steel Fabrications

The Angel of the North is a contemporary sculpture by Antony Gormley, located in Gateshead, Tyne and Wear, England. Completed in 1998, it is seen by an estimated 33 million people every year due to its proximity to the A1 and A167 roads and the East Coast Main Line. The design of the Angel, like many of Gormley's works, is based on Gormley's own body. The COR-TEN weathering steel material gives the sculpture its distinctive rusty, oxidised colour. It stands 20 metres (66 ft) tall with a wingspan of 54 metres (177 ft). The vertical ribs on its body and wings act as an external skeleton which direct oncoming wind to the sculpture's foundations, allowing it to withstand wind speeds of over 100 miles per hour (160 km/h).

The sculpture was commissioned and delivered by Gateshead Council who approached Gormley to be the sculptor. Although initially reluctant, Gormley agreed to undertake the project after visiting and being inspired by the Angel's proposed site, a former colliery overlooking the varied topography of the Tyne and Wear Lowlands National Character Area.

Hartlepool Steel Fabrications were responsible for the manufacture and assembly of the 208-tonne sculpture. On 14 February 1998, the Angel was transported overnight to the installation site and erected the next morning. The project faced opposition during its design and construction, but is now widely recognised as an iconic example of public art and a symbol of Gateshead and the wider North East region.

== History ==
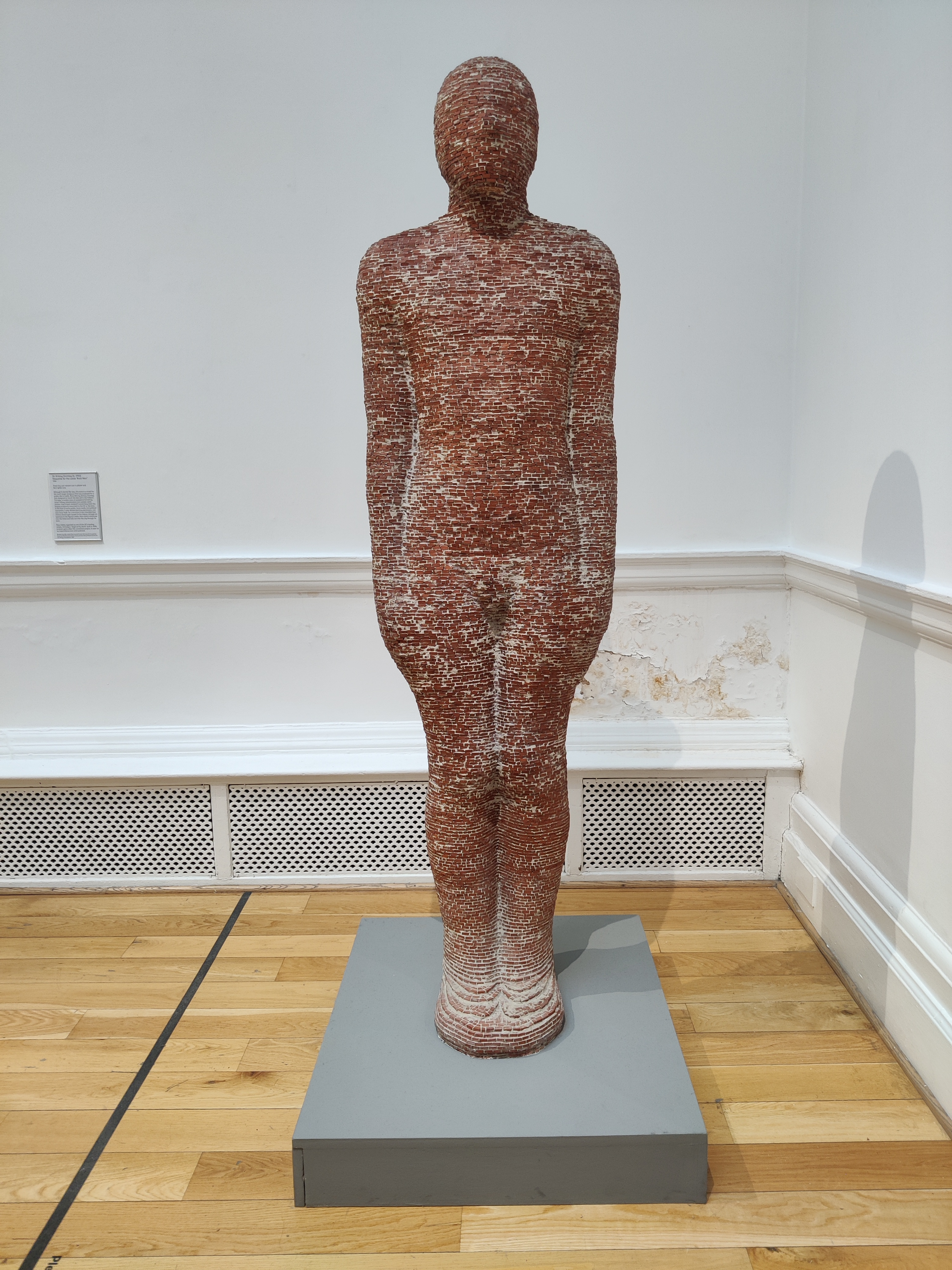
Maquette (1986) for Antony Gormley's proposed Brick Man sculpture, at Leeds City Art Gallery. The work would have been around 120 feet (37 m) tall.

Prior to the construction of the Angel of the North, Gormley had been in discussion about the creation of a brick sculpture, Brick Man, in Leeds. It would have been around 120 feet (37 m) tall. The project never came to fruition, although a human-sized maquette (1986) is in Leeds City Art Gallery. At that time, the most significant landmarks that signalled travellers' arrival into Tyneside, when travelling from the south, were the bridges that crossed the River Tyne. In 1990, Gateshead Council first conceived of a sculpture to act as a new landmark for the southern approach into Gateshead and Tyneside, standing near the A1 and A167 road interchange. Mike White, the Assistant Director Arts at Gateshead Council from 1989 to 2000, stated that the intention was for the Angel of the North to act as a "millennial image that would be a marker and guardian for our town". The process to commission and deliver a sculpture was led by Gateshead Council's Art in Public Places panel, the Libraries & Arts and Planning & Engineering Departments, and Northern Arts – a regional subdivision of the Arts Council of Great Britain which existed from 1990 to 2002. The Council applied for £45,000 of funding from Northern Arts for the selection of an artist and the delivery of an initial design. Although this was the largest public art project the council had planned to date, Gateshead had already undergone multiple regeneration projects. In the 1980s the construction of Gateshead International Stadium and the MetroCentre signalled a step forward in urban regeneration, and in 1990 the Gateshead National Garden Festival and Riverside Sculpture Park marked the borough's emerging arts policy. The 1990s also saw the conception of other regional transformation projects including the Baltic Centre for Contemporary Art and Gateshead Millennium Bridge.

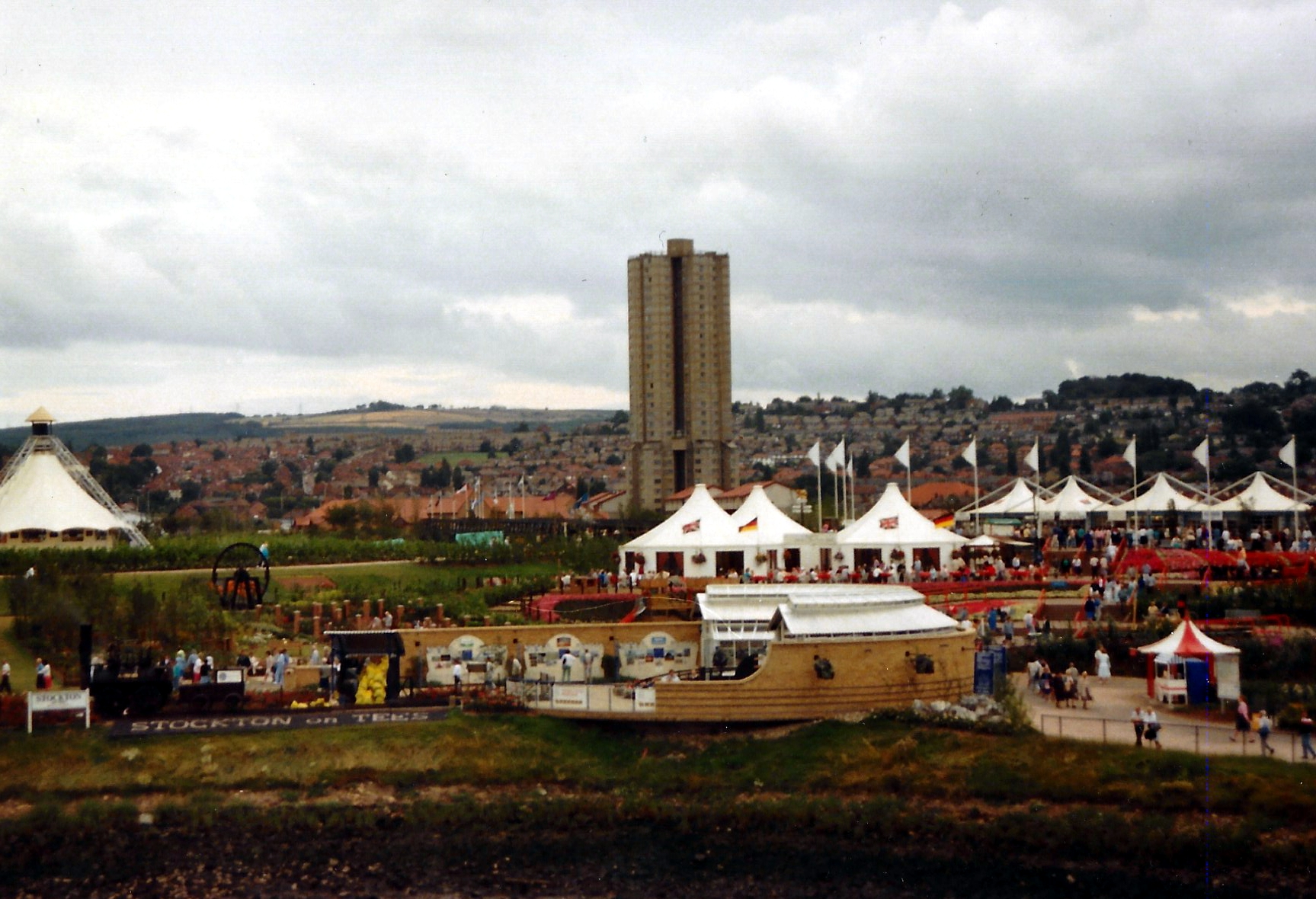
Gateshead Garden Festival was held in 1990 and signalled an emerging arts policy in the borough.

The council's Art in Public Places Panel met three times to decide upon a shortlist of artists to build the new sculpture. They were inspired by Antony Gormley's series of structures called The Case for an Angel which he began creating in 1989. After two years of looking for a suitable candidate, Gormley was ultimately selected. After originally claiming that he did not "do roundabout art", Gormley was inspired after visiting the proposed site of the sculpture, comparing it to a "megalithic burial chamber". 43-year-old Gormley was commissioned by August 1994. The intention was to have the structure built by 1996, the Year of Visual Arts. Gateshead Council had plans for six more huge statues. The structure was to cost £500,000.

Gateshead planning committee voted 15–5 to let the sculpture be built on Wednesday 4 January 1995, under chairman Pat Conaty, and the council engineer Roger Turner. The choice of an angel figure came from Conaty, not Gormley. The Lib Dems (Peter Maughan) deeply opposed the planning application, saying 'we must not endorse this application'. The only Conservative on the council (Martin Callanan) said it would be 'ugly and intrusive'. The planning application, at Eighton Lodge, would need approval of the full council at the next meeting. At Gateshead Civic Centre, the council voted 41–14 to approve the scheme.

Gateshead Council acquired funding of £800,000. £584,000 came from the Arts Council England, £150,000 from the European Regional Development Fund, £45,000 from Northern Arts, plus private sponsorship. Momentum for the sculpture continued into 1996, when a 1:20 maquette of the Angel went on display in Shipley Gallery, and Northern Arts won the Festival for UK Visual Arts Year. A two-year series of educational events were conducted with 30 schools and 1,400 children in the area who built their own small-scale versions of the Angel which later went on display in venues around Gateshead and in Sunderland.

== Description ==
=== Design ===
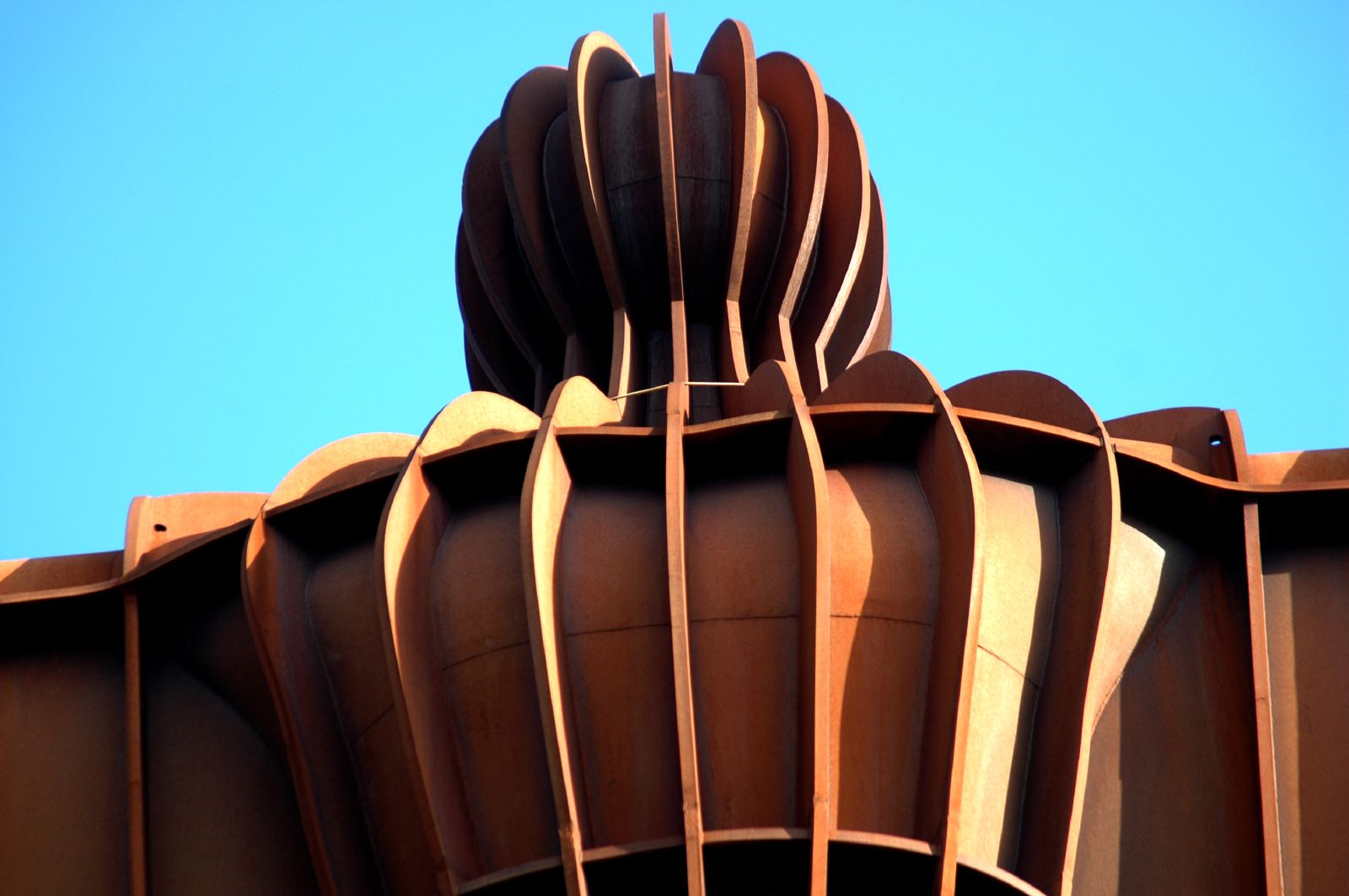
Vertical parallel ribs run from the head of the Angel of the North down the rest of its body.

The Angel, like much of Gormley's other work, is based on a cast of his own body. The steel sculpture is 208 tonnes, 20 metres (66 ft) tall, with wings measuring 54 metres (177 ft) across. Its sheer size and dominance over the surrounding landscape allows for an artistic impact on a large audience. Its wingspan is often compared to that of a Boeing 757 jet, which is actually smaller. The wings are 6.2 metres (20 ft) high at the point where they join the body. It is defined by a rusty, oxidised colour which comes from the COR-TEN weathering steel material which, despite being distinctive, does not contrast harshly with the nearby environment. Inspired by this colour, Gormley had originally intended to call the sculpture The Iron Angel of the North. The wings are angled 3.5 degrees forward to create, according to Gormley, "a sense of embrace". They are regular and symmetrical in shape, which contrast with the asymmetrical body.

The Angel, which weighs 208 tonnes, stands on top of a 5.3-metre (17 ft) base, which itself rests on a concrete slab 150 centimetres (59 in) thick covering 100 square metres (1,100 sq ft). Due to its exposed location, Gateshead Council's engineering director sought advice from Ove Arup & Partners on how the sculpture could be built to withstand winds of over 100 miles per hour (160 km/h). Although sculptures are often made out of bronze, Arup determined that the material would not be strong enough for a structure the size of the Angel, and weathering steel was used instead. The sculpture, in contrast to other sculptures including the Statue of Liberty, has no internal skeleton to aid with wind resistance or overall stability. Instead, vertical parallel "ribs" run from the head to the feet of the sculpture which function as an external skeleton, breaking up the strength of oncoming wind and focussing it down to the foundations.

Although the Angel of the North is a static sculpture, it is intended to be viewed from many angles and by travellers who pass by at speed – an average of 60 miles per hour (97 km/h) by road. A clause which was added by Gormley to the original agreement concerning the sculpture in 1994 states that it cannot be illuminated. The Angel of the North was designed to have a life of more than 100 years. It has been claimed that it is Britain's largest sculpture, but other sculptures – including Anish Kapoor's ArcelorMittal Orbit – also claim the title.

=== Location ===
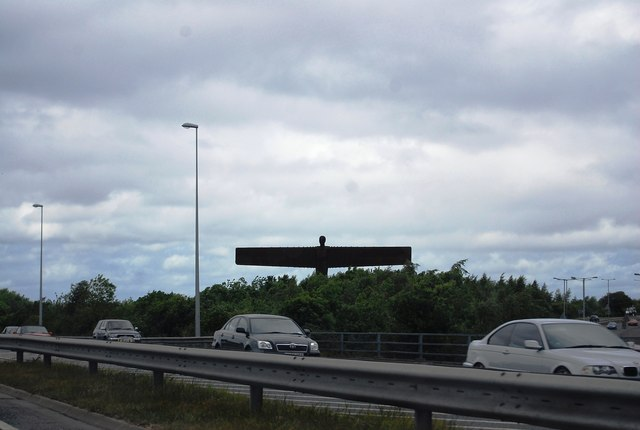
The Angel of the North viewed from the A1 near Lamesley.

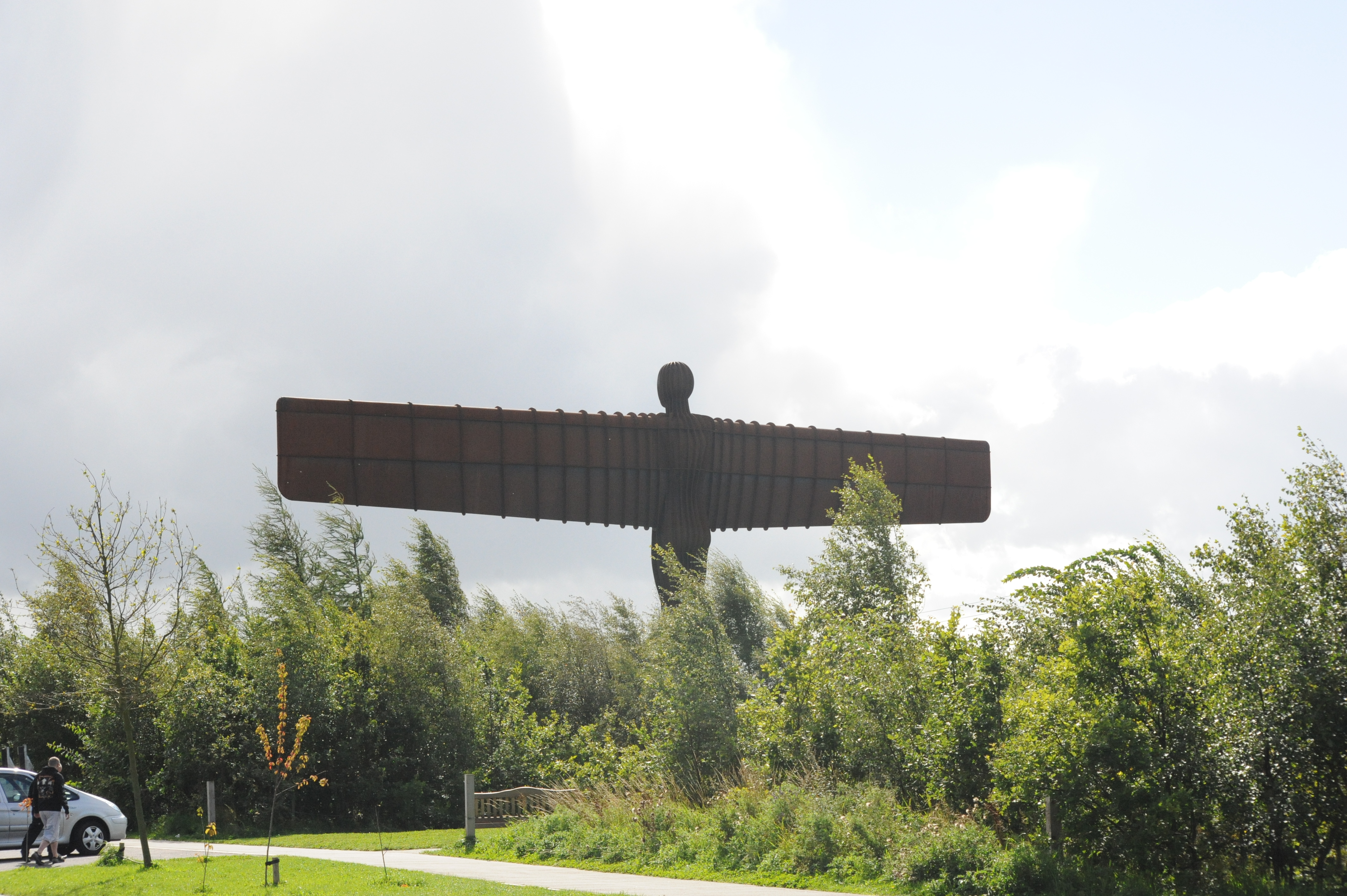
The Angel of the North viewed from the nearby car park. Since its installation in 1998, the view has become more obstructed by the growth of trees

The sculpture stands on a hill at Low Eighton in Lamesley Parish, overlooking the A1 and A167 roads and the East Coast Main Line rail route. It lies within the Tyne and Wear Lowlands National Character Area which contains both urban areas and large stretches of fields. The area is also characterised by variations in topography. The Angel sits on top of one of the more elevated positions of the landscape located near Team Valley, allowing the sculpture to be seen from miles around. In the design brief for the Angel, the designated location was described as "commanding views... from distances of up to 4 kilometres arcing through 100 degrees" with landmarks including Durham Cathedral visible. The Angel was built on land which previously contained a reservoir of the former Team Colliery, which was in use from the 1720s until the 1960s. The remains of the colliery were removed and earth was piled up into a knoll which the Angel now stands on. Gormley commented on this historic connection, saying "When you think of the mining that was done underneath the site, there is a poetic resonance. Men worked beneath the surface in the dark. Now, in the light, there is a celebration of this industry." The sculpture faces south, facing the traffic travelling north into Gateshead and towards Tyneside. Historically, the nearby valley allowed for a convenient passage into Tyne and Wear from the south. Over time, this evolved into more established modern travel routes. Due to its proximity to the main road and rail line, it is estimated that 33 million people see the Angel every year, including those in the roughly 90,000 vehicles which pass each day. The statue can also been seen from nearby housing estates and commercial areas.

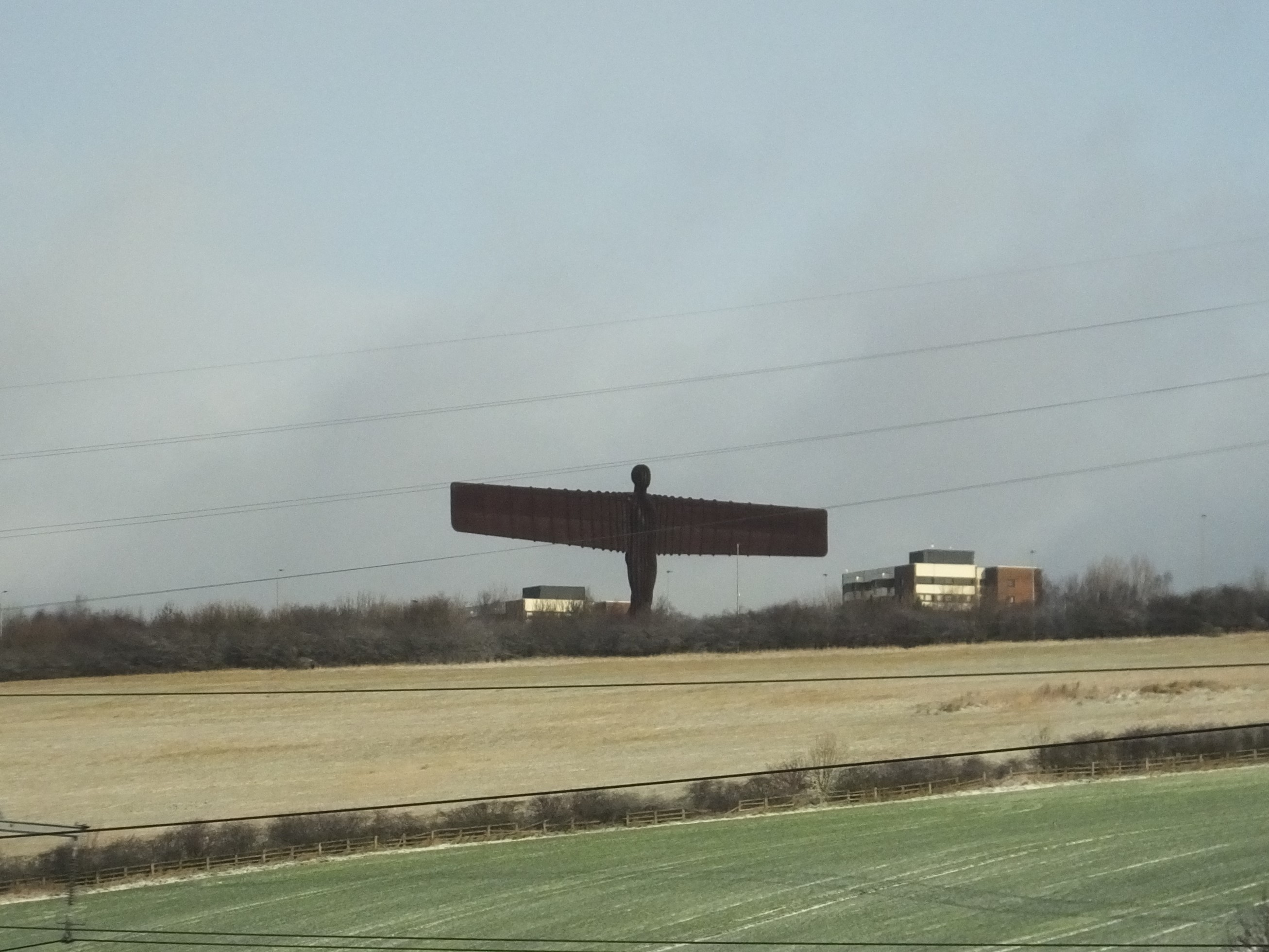
The statue viewed from a train on the nearby East Coast Mainline

The statue can be accessed by road via the A167 and a nearby car and coach park allows people to stop and view the sculpture up close. It also be reached on foot by a number of footpaths. Accessibility, including sitting on and touching the sculpture, is encouraged. It is flanked on the east and west sides by woodland, which has become more prevalent during the life of the Angel. Since 1998, the appearance of the sculpture has become less open and more secluded due to the growth of trees. The trees were planted intentionally along section of the A1 as part of the former Great North Forest initiative and the original brief for the Angel stated that the sculpture would eventually be characterised by a woodland context. When travelling north by road, the first views of the Angel are partially hidden by trees. Train passengers on the East Coast Main Line, located around 600 metres (2,000 ft) to the west, are able to see the statue as they travel past.

== Construction and installation ==
Work began on the project in 1994. Following a competitive tendering process, Hartlepool Steel Fabrications Ltd was chosen to fabricate the Angel. The construction took place in a shed bearing the name 'Hartlepool Erections Group', which Gormley visited most weeks during production. The sculpture was constructed in three parts: the body weighing 100 tonnes (98 long tons; 110 short tons) and two wings each weighing 50 tonnes (49 long tons; 55 short tons). Steel fabrication began in June 1997.

Twenty-metre foundations containing 600 tonnes (590 long tons; 660 short tons) of concrete form the base of the statue, anchoring it to the rock 70 feet (21 m) below, built from Monday 1 September 1997, by Thomas Armstrong Ltd of Flimby, west Cumbria. Additionally, the old mine workings under the statue had 100 tonnes of grout pumped into them to stabilise the site.

Gormley made a number of smaller models of the Angel to refine its design. The last smaller model needed to be perfectly scaled-up to inform the shape of the final full-size sculpture. Newcastle University was commissioned to use stereophotography to scan and create a computer-generated replica of the model. The details of the replica were then fed into a cutting machine to create the plates for Hartlepool Steel Fabrications.

On 14 February 1998, the components were transported in convoy, the body on a 48-wheel trailer, from their construction site in Hartlepool to the installation site 28 miles (45 km) away. The journey, undertaken at night, took five hours and attracted large crowds. The next morning, the Angel was lowered into position. The first wing was attached to the body at around 11 am and the second at 4 pm. The spectacle of the installation attracted crowds of thousands and over 20 television crews. A plaque beside the angel contains a quotation from Gormley: "The hill top site is important and has the feeling of being a megalithic mound. When you think of the mining that was done underneath the site, there is a poetic resonance. Men worked beneath the surface in the dark... It is important to me that the Angel is rooted in the ground – the complete antithesis of what an angel is, floating about in the ether. It has an air of mystery. You make things because they cannot be said."

== Artistic significance and symbolism ==
The North of England Civic Trust's study on the significance of the Angel of the North claims that the sculpture may be "the most prominent piece of post-World War II public art in the UK", and "arguably the best known and most easily recognisable public artwork in the UK". It has also been described as the first significant example of gigantism in British sculpture. The Angel of the North differs from some other post-War art in that, being figurative, it clearly represents the human body rather than abstract forms. This human-like representation, combined with the fact that the Angel does not commemorate any one person or people, has meant that viewers have more easily and freely attached their own meaning to the sculpture. Such symbolisms have included optimism associated with the millennium, a historical connection with the miners who worked under the land on which the Angel stands, and personal or religious experiences.

Like many of Antony Gormley's sculptures, the Angel provokes questions about the relationship between art, politics, the environment, and society. Gormley has commented on the choice of depicting an angel for the sculpture, suggesting that the image was multi-functional; as a reminder of the industrial history of the site, beneath which was a disused quarry where miners had worked for centuries; as a reference to the future, symbolising the transition from the industrial to the information age; and as a focus for human hopes and fears. The Angel as conceived of by Gormley is therefore a symbol of hope rather than one of religion. Gormley also stated "People are always asking, why an angel? The only response I can give is that no-one has ever seen one and we need to keep imagining them." In comparing the modernity of the sculpture to historic concepts of angels, Gail-Nina Anderson remarked that the Angel of the North "is also an angel for the 1990s, a high-tech tribute to modern engineering in a period busy with amusing itself with fairies and angels, spirit-guides and reincarnations."

== Reception ==
Plans for the sculpture encountered significant opposition. Gormley has subsequently acknowledged being "snooty" towards the project; when originally approached by Gateshead Council, he scorned the opportunity, saying that he "did not make motorway art". Local newspapers ran campaigns against the proposed sculpture, in which local politicians joined. Some critics compared the Angel to fascist or communist monumentalism, including The Gateshead Post who went as far as to draw comparisons between the Angel and a 1930s Nazi statue. Concerns were raised about the potential for traffic accidents resulting from the statue's proximity to the A1 dual carriageway and that it would interfere with television and radio reception.

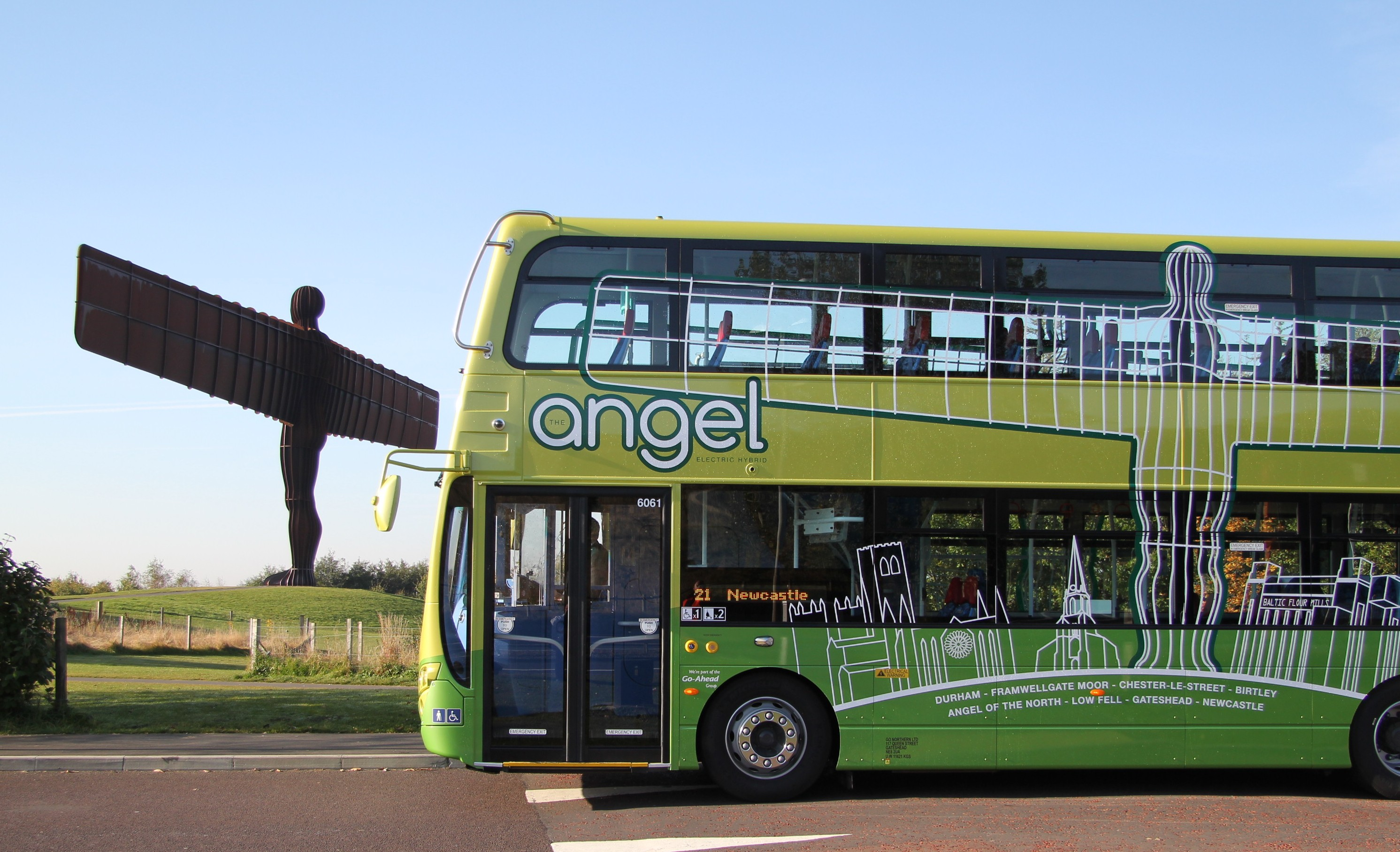
The Angel of the North has become an iconic symbol of the North East and is used in a variety of local situations, such as imagery on Go North East Angel buses

Since its construction, the sculpture has continued to generate comment, and has been the focus of a number of publicity stunts. In 2011, Gateshead Council refused Tourism Ireland permission to illuminate the Angel for Saint Patrick's Day. In 2014, supermarket chain Morrisons was compelled to apologise after projecting an advertisement onto the Angel, which Gormley himself called "shocking and stupid". The Vote Leave campaign projected their logo and message onto the sculpture in 2016, which prompted a legal letter from Gormley's solicitors stating that the projection was "unlawful and damaging to the integrity of this important work". On Christmas Eve 2018, a group of ten pranksters abseiled the sculpture to place a santa hat atop its head, having taken six previous failed attempts to do so over several christmasses. Gateshead Council welcomed the stunt, and the group took the hat down before the end of the year whilst dressed as the Grinch.

In 2021, concerns that the sculpture's setting would be detrimentally affected by a road-widening project led The Twentieth Century Society to seek listed building status for the structure. The Society's application was turned down by Historic England, the body responsible for the National Heritage List for England, which stated that threats to a structure's setting did not form part of its criteria for listing.

Over 20 years after its completion, the Angel is considered a landmark for the North East. It was an important part of the area's regeneration around the time of the millennium. It has been listed as an "Icon of England", and been described as "one of the most talked about and recognisable pieces of public art ever produced." A display board next to it claims that it has inspired the community, brought pride and belief to the people of Gateshead, and brings daily national and international attention to the region. A study conducted by Maeve Blackman of Durham University suggested that the Angel had improved the wellbeing and pride of Gateshead residents. Martin Roberts, in his 2021 revised edition of County Durham for the Buildings of England series, wrote: "Of all Gateshead Council's great projects, the Angel perhaps posed the greatest risk, yet delivered the greatest reward. Its erection captured the public imagination, its design won critical praise, and it gave both the town and the region a new symbol."

== Maquettes ==
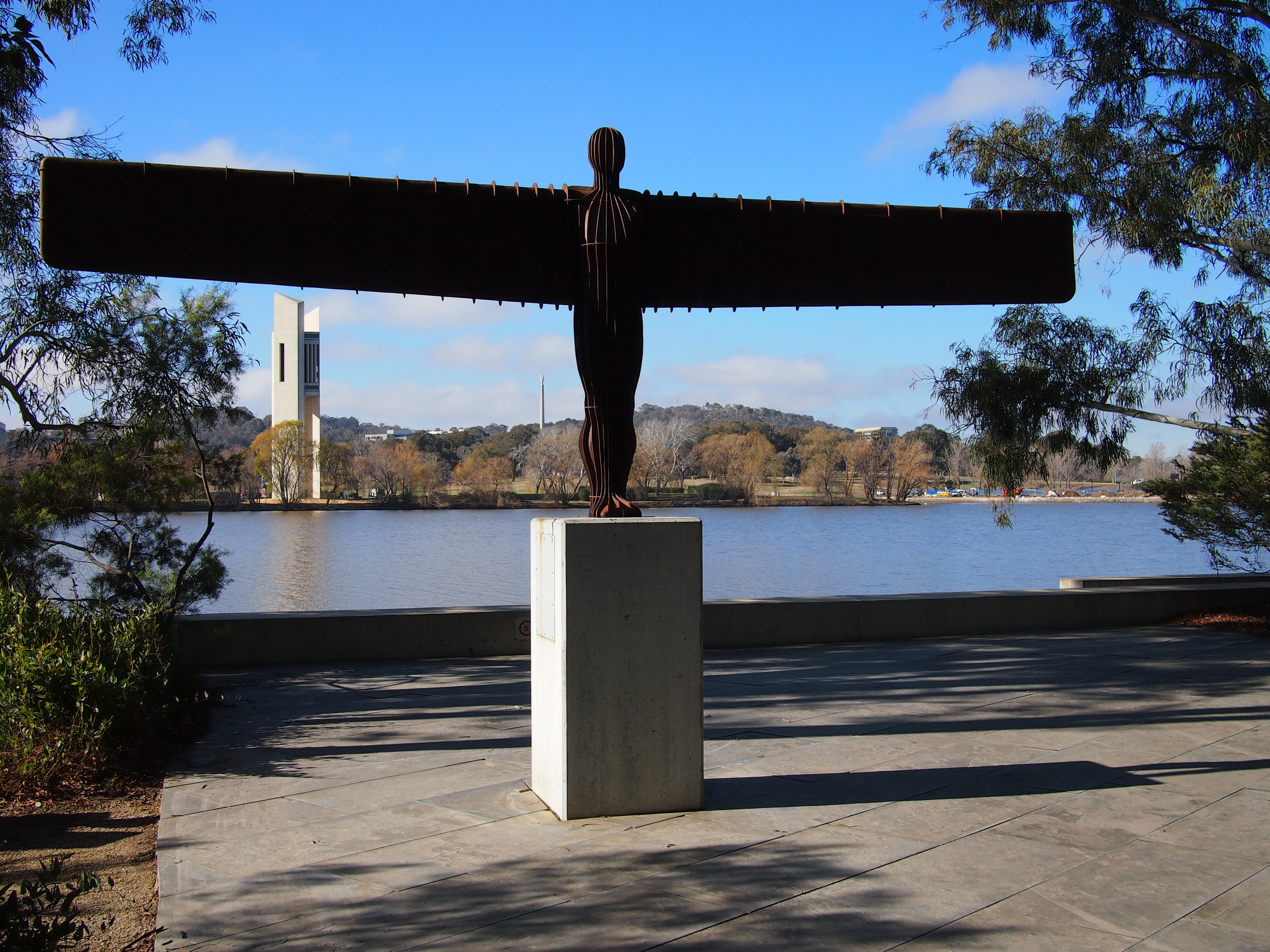
Angel of the North (life-size maquette) on display in the grounds of the National Gallery of Australia

Several maquettes were produced during the development stage of the project which are now considered valuable items. A scale model from which the sculpture was created was sold at auction for £2.28 million in July 2008. An additional bronze maquette used in fundraising in the 1990s, owned by Gateshead Council, was valued at £1 million on the BBC show Antiques Roadshow broadcast on 16 November 2008 – the most valuable item ever appraised on the programme. In 2011, a 1.9-metre (75-inch) maquette was sold at Christie's in London for £3.4 million to an anonymous bidder. Another maquette was donated to the National Gallery of Australia in 2009, and stands in its Sculpture Garden. Another model (scale 1:20) is on display in the grounds of Museum Voorlinden in the Netherlands.

== See also ==
- List of tallest statues
- Angel of the West, an outdoor sculpture in Jupiter, Florida, US, the name of which references Gormley's sculpture
- White Horse at Ebbsfleet, an abandoned plan for a sculpture in Ebbsfleet Valley which was dubbed Angel of the South
- Willow Man, a sculpture in Somerset, England, which has been dubbed The Angel of the South
- On Freedom's Wings, a life-size sculpture of a Lancaster bomber in Lincolnshire, England
