= RAF Bomber Command Memorial =

Memorial in Green Park, London

- United Kingdom
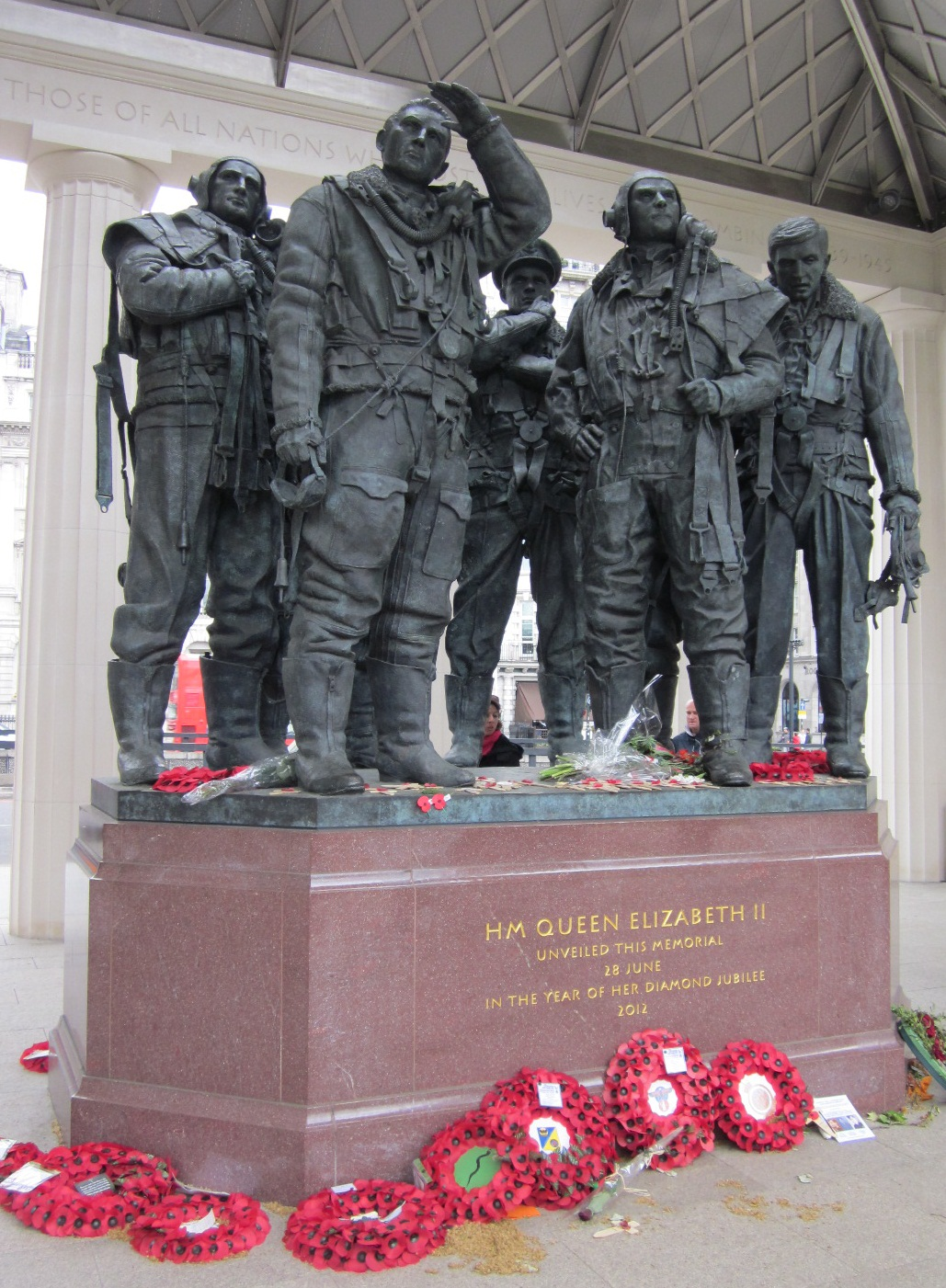
- Sculpture within the memorial
- For the 55,573 aircrew of RAF Bomber Command who died during the Second World War
- Unveiled: 28 June 2012; 14 years ago
- Location: 51°30′12″N 0°8′56″W; Green Park, London W1, United Kingdom
- Designed by: Liam O'Connor (memorial); Philip Jackson (sculpture)
- Freedom is the sure possession of those alone who have the courage to defend it

The Royal Air Force Bomber Command Memorial is a memorial in Green Park, London, commemorating the crews of RAF Bomber Command who embarked on missions during the Second World War. The memorial, on the south side of Piccadilly, facing Hyde Park Corner, was built to mark the sacrifice of 55,573 aircrew from Britain, Canada, Australia, New Zealand, Poland, Czechoslovakia and other allied countries, as well as civilians of all nations killed during raids.

Queen Elizabeth II unveiled the memorial on 28 June 2012, in the year of her Diamond Jubilee.

== History ==
Following World War II the legacy of Bomber Command proved controversial, with both legal and ethical arguments highlighting the indiscriminate nature of strategic bombing. During World War II, many military strategists of air power believed that air forces could win major victories by attacking industrial and political infrastructure, rather than purely military targets. Strategic bombing often involved bombing areas inhabited by civilians, and some campaigns were deliberately designed to target civilian populations in order to terrorize them or to weaken their morale. Although International law at the outset of World War II did not specifically forbid the aerial bombardment of cities, the scale of the destruction and of civilian casualties proved to be a distasteful memory of the conflict. The controversy meant that an official memorial to the aircrews was not erected until nearly 70 years after the war.

An appeal was made for £5.6 million (equivalent to £8.1 million in 2025) to build the memorial, and funding came from donations made by the public. Musicians Robin Gibb (The Bee Gees) and Jim Dooley (The Dooleys) became key figures behind the appeal, working to raise funds and have the memorial built.

== Design ==
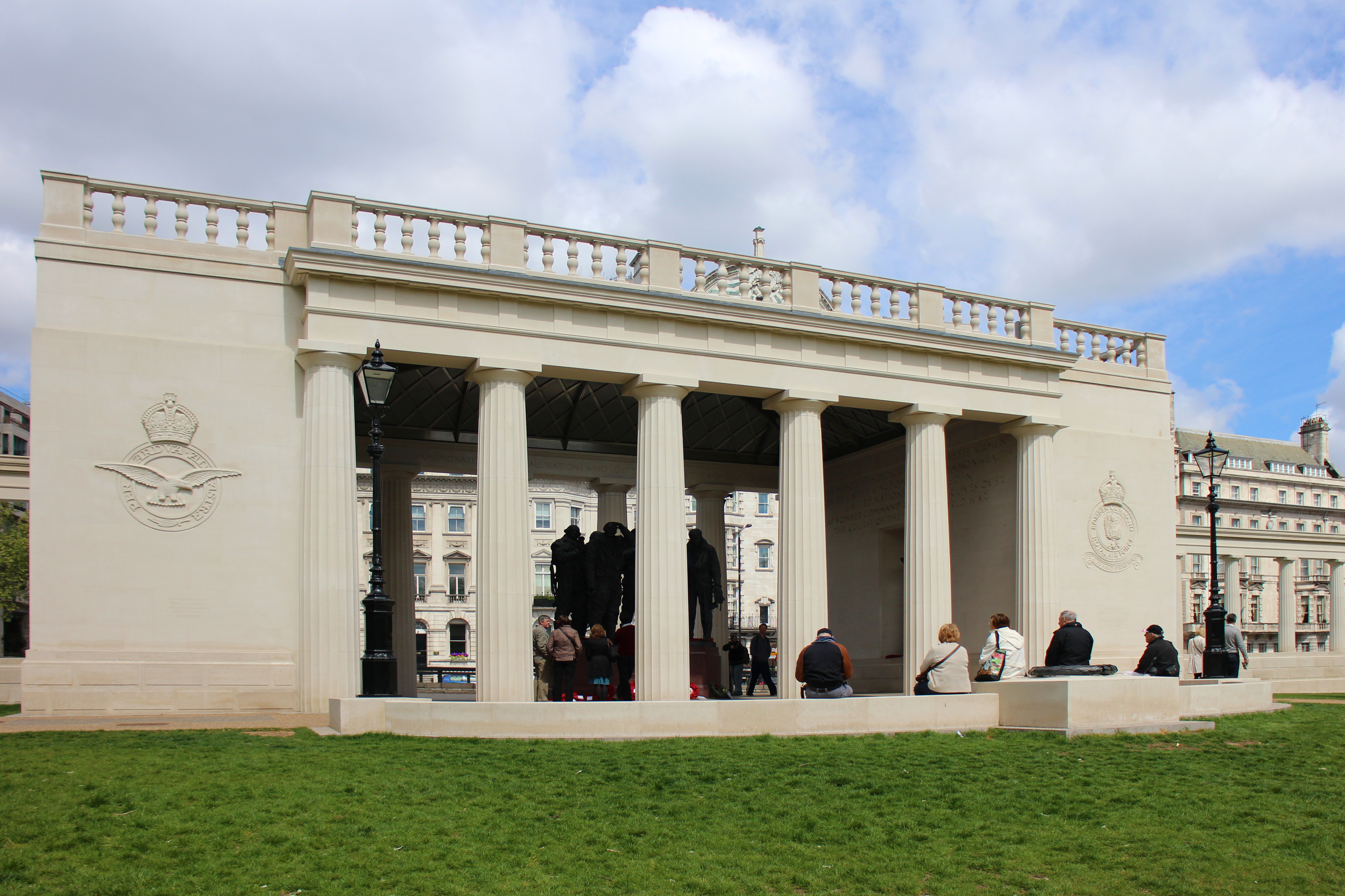
Exterior of the memorial in 2013.

Liam O'Connor designed the memorial, built of Portland stone, which features a bronze 9-foot (2.7 m) sculpture of seven aircrew, designed by the sculptor Philip Jackson to look as though they have just returned from a bombing mission and left their aircraft.

Aluminium from a Royal Canadian Air Force Handley Page Halifax of No. 426 Squadron that had crashed in Schendelbeke in Belgium in May 1944 was used to build the roof of the memorial, which was designed to evoke the geodetic structure of the Vickers Wellington. The Halifax, LW682 OW/M, had been removed from a swamp in 1997 with three of the crew found still at their posts. They were buried with full military honours in Geraardsbergen and the remains of the aircraft were sent to Canada. Some of the metal was used for the restoration of a Halifax in Trenton, Ontario, and the rest was melted down by the Bomber Command Museum of Canada in Nanton, Alberta. The Museum provided ingots for the memorial to commemorate the 10,659 Canadians out of a total of 55,573 Bomber Command aircrew killed during the war. Furthermore, some of this aluminium was supplied to the International Bomber Command Centre, which opened in Lincoln, England in 2018, and forms the rear plate of its "Additions Panel".

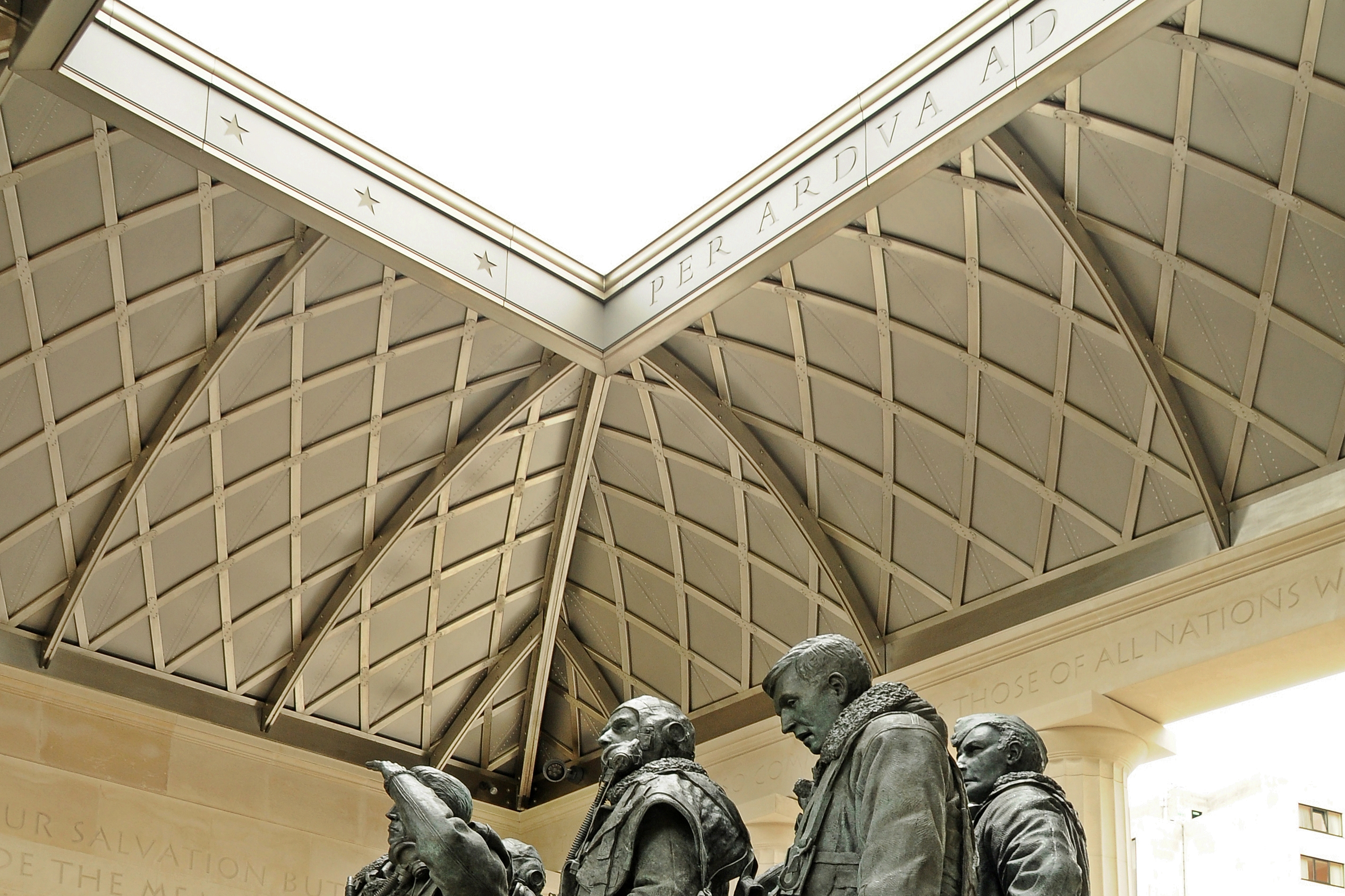
Interior view of the memorial's aluminium roof

On both walls inside the monument there are inscriptions that read:

THIS MEMORIAL IS DEDICATED TO THE 55,573 AIRMEN/ FROM THE UNITED KINGDOM, BRITISH COMMONWEALTH/ & ALLIED NATIONS WHO SERVED IN/ RAF BOMBER COMMAND & LOST THEIR LIVES OVER/ THE COURSE OF THE SECOND WORLD WAR

and, on the opposite wall:

THE FIGHTERS ARE OUR SALVATION BUT THE/ BOMBERS ALONE PROVIDE THE MEANS OF VICTORY/ WINSTON CHURCHILL SEPTEMBER 1940

The inside face of the architrave to the rear of the statues carries the inscription:

THIS MEMORIAL ALSO COMMEMORATES THOSE OF ALL NATIONS WHO LOST THEIR LIVES IN THE BOMBING OF 1939–1945

The large plinth carrying the statues bears the inscription:

HM QUEEN ELIZABETH II/ UNVEILED THIS MEMORIAL/ 28 JUNE/ IN THE YEAR OF HER DIAMOND JUBILEE/ 2012

The rear face has a quotation from Pericles's Funeral Oration:

FREEDOM IS THE SURE POSSESSION OF THOSE ALONE WHO/ HAVE THE COURAGE TO DEFEND IT/ PERICLES

== Since opening ==
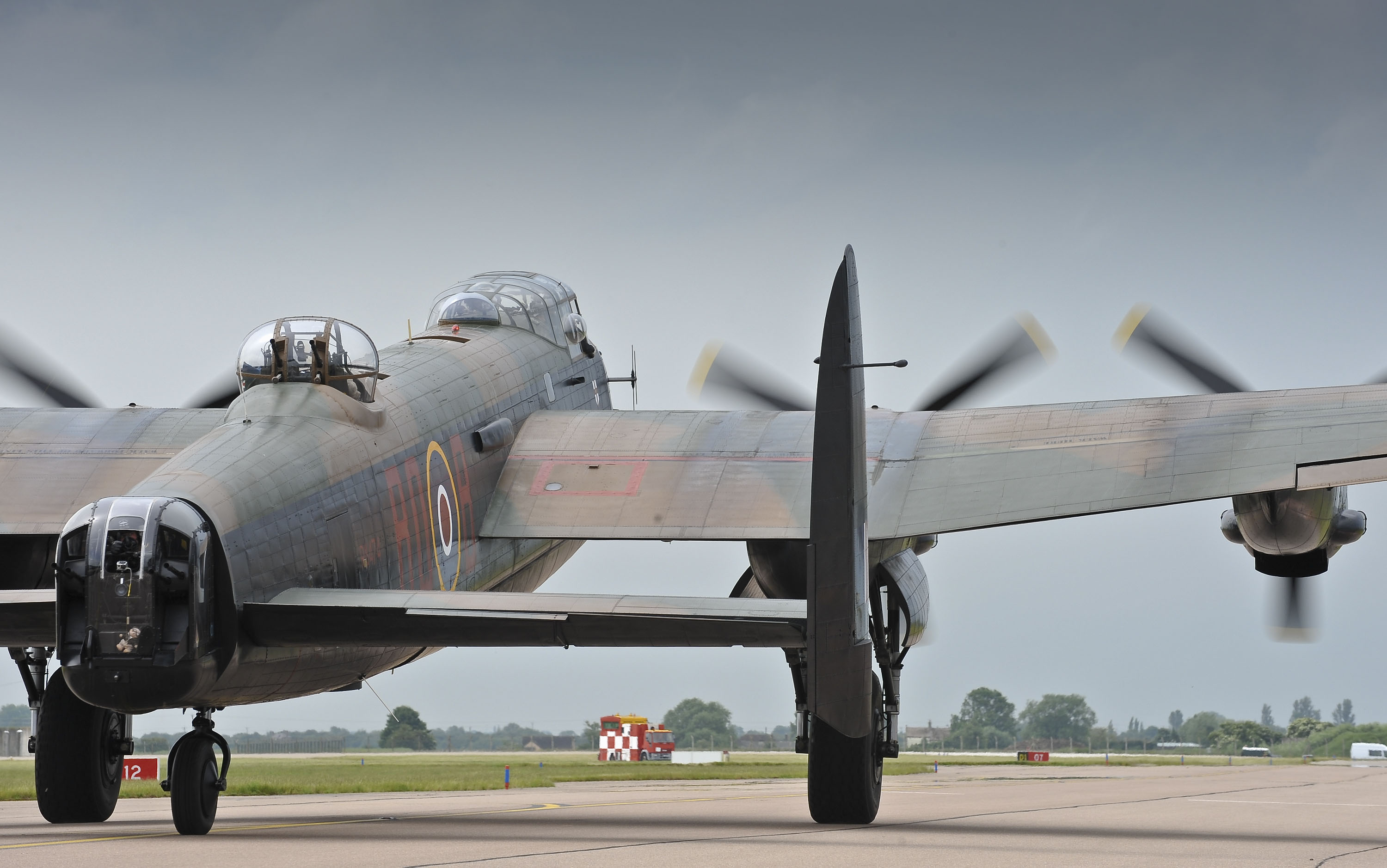
Avro Lancaster PA474 carrying 800,000 poppies, taking off from RAF Coningsby on 28 June 2012 for the opening ceremony

Queen Elizabeth II formally opened the memorial on 28 June 2012, unveiling the bronze sculpture. The ceremony was attended by 6,000 veterans and family members of those killed, and the Avro Lancaster of the Battle of Britain Memorial Flight dropped red poppy petals over Green Park.

In May 2013 the memorial was vandalised. The word "Islam" was spray-painted on the memorial and on the nearby Animals in War Memorial in Hyde Park.

In March 2015, Les Munro, Royal New Zealand Air Force squadron leader and one of the last surviving members of the Dambusters Raid, intended to sell his war medals and flight logbook at auction to raise funds for the upkeep of the memorial. The auction was cancelled after Michael Ashcroft donated £75,000 (equivalent to £103,600 in 2025) to the Royal Air Force Benevolent Fund towards the upkeep, with a further NZ$19,500 donated by the Museum of Transport and Technology in Auckland, New Zealand, to whom Munro then offered his medals for display. Munro, aged 96, died that August.

== See also ==
- International Bomber Command Centre
- On Freedom's Wings
