= Team Colliery =

Coordinates: 54.916783°N 1.590314°W

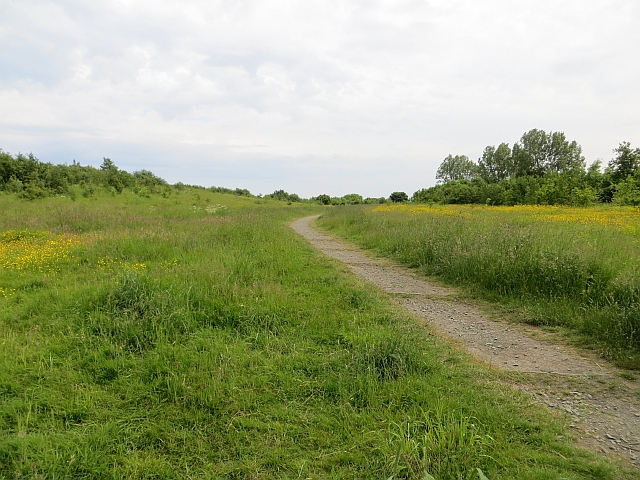
- Footpath at Team Colliery

- Location within Tyne and Wear
- OS grid reference: NZ275595
- Metropolitan borough: Gateshead
- Metropolitan county: Tyne and Wear
- Region: North East
- Country: England
- Sovereign state: United Kingdom
- Post town: GATESHEAD
- Postcode district: NE9
- Dialling code: 0191
- Police: Northumbria
- Fire: Tyne and Wear
- Ambulance: North East
- UK Parliament: Gateshead

Team Colliery is a hamlet and estate in the Metropolitan Borough of Gateshead, Tyne and Wear, England. The estate is made up of 23 private and rented houses which form the street Cowen Gardens. Team Colliery is part of Lamesley parish. It borders Allerdene to the North, Harlow Green to the East, Low Eighton to the south, and Lamesley to the west. It is one of the oldest estates in the area, pre-dating the more recently built Harlow Green and Allerdene which split the estate from Low Fell. Team Colliery can only be accessed Northbound by Durham Road.

The estate is situated next to a field what was once the Bath Houses of the former Ravensworth Ann Colliery, also known as Low Eighton Colliery, and Team Colliery from which the estate owes its name. The colliery opened in 1726 and closed 1973.

Besides houses the estate formerly was home to small allotments and currently holds a small outdoor bowling green.

The estate is situated directly behind the Angel of the North being only 322 meters from the iconic statue, and over looks the Team Valley to the west.

The estate is featured in the first scene of the opening credits to the ITV detective series Vera.
