= Brick Man =

Sculpture proposed by Antony Gormley in the 1980s

Coordinates: 53°47′29″N 1°33′27″W

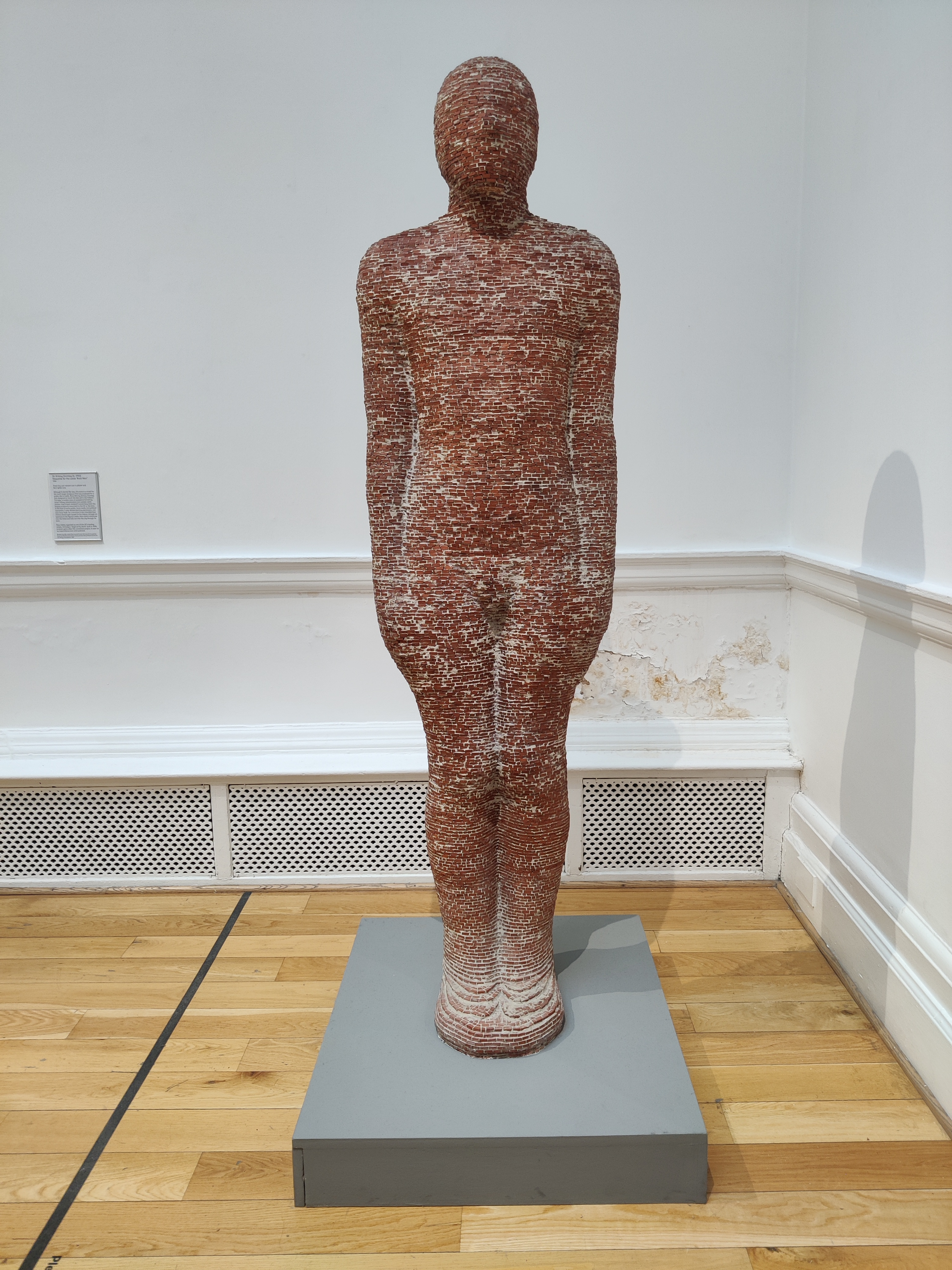
Maquette (1986) for Antony Gormley's proposed Brick Man, at Leeds City Art Gallery

Brick Man was an Antony Gormley sculpture proposed in the 1980s for the city of Leeds, West Yorkshire, England.

== History and description ==
A male human figure made of clay building bricks, standing around 120 feet (37 m) tall, it would have stood on a triangle of land bounded by railway lines in the Holbeck area of the city, greeting travellers arriving at Leeds railway station. It would have cost £600,000 and been the largest sculpture in the UK at the time. Visitors would have been able to enter via a doorway in the heels, climb stairs, and look out through the ears.

The sculpture was one of 20 designs produced in response to a competition to find an artwork for the site, but the proposal was ultimately rejected by Leeds City Council in 1988. Conservative councillor Richard Hughes-Rowlands said at the time: "If Mr Gormley is talking about it [Brick Man] going somewhere else, my eyes won't exactly be weeping tears."

Gormley has blamed "lack of nerve" for the rejection of his idea, adding: "I think of it still as my best attempt to allude to the collective body." The idea of an iconic landmark sculpture of the human form later saw the light of day in Gormley's Angel of the North, which is 66 feet (20 m) tall.

A plaster maquette – cast from Gormley's own body – for the sculpture can be seen in Leeds City Art Gallery.

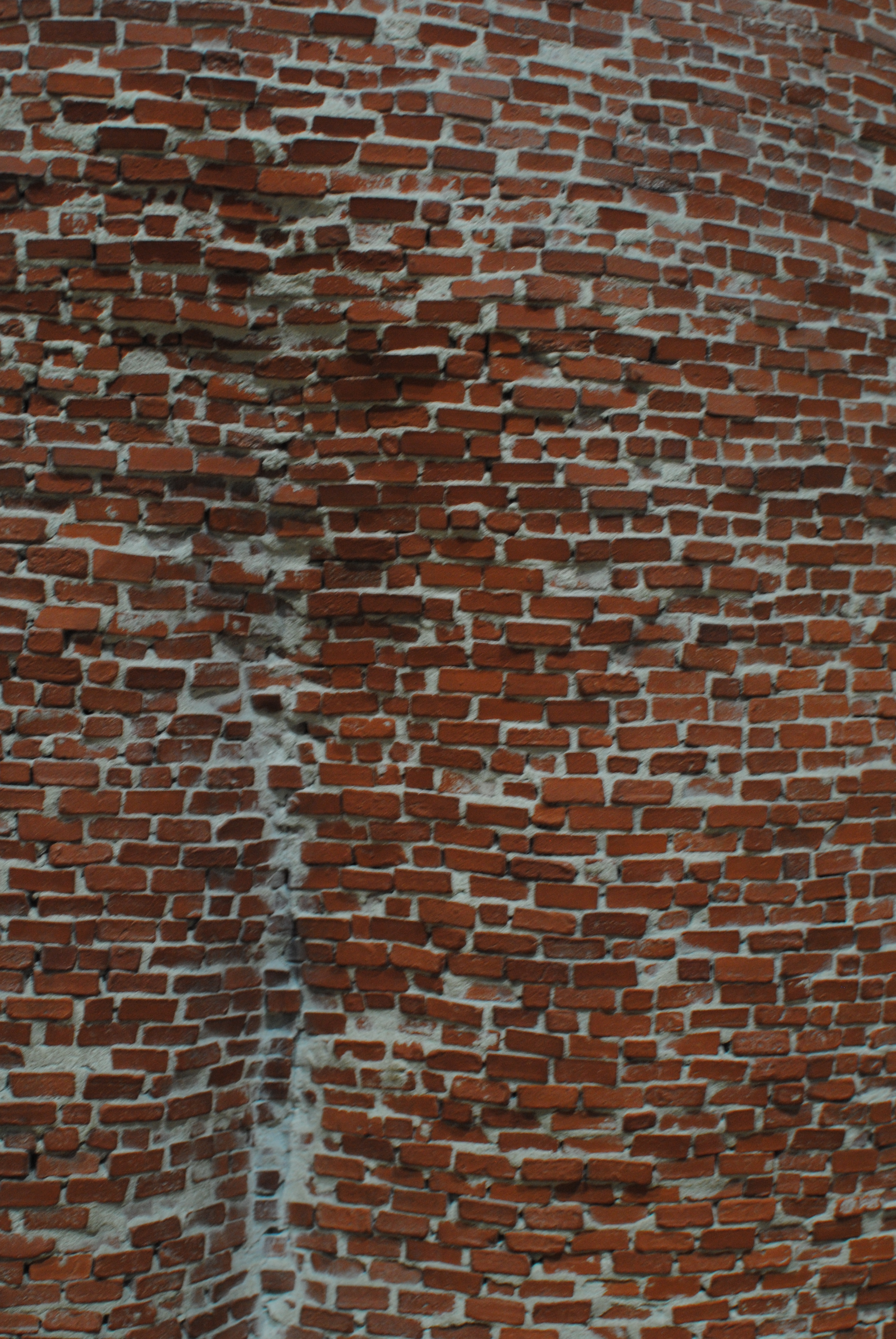
Texture of maquette

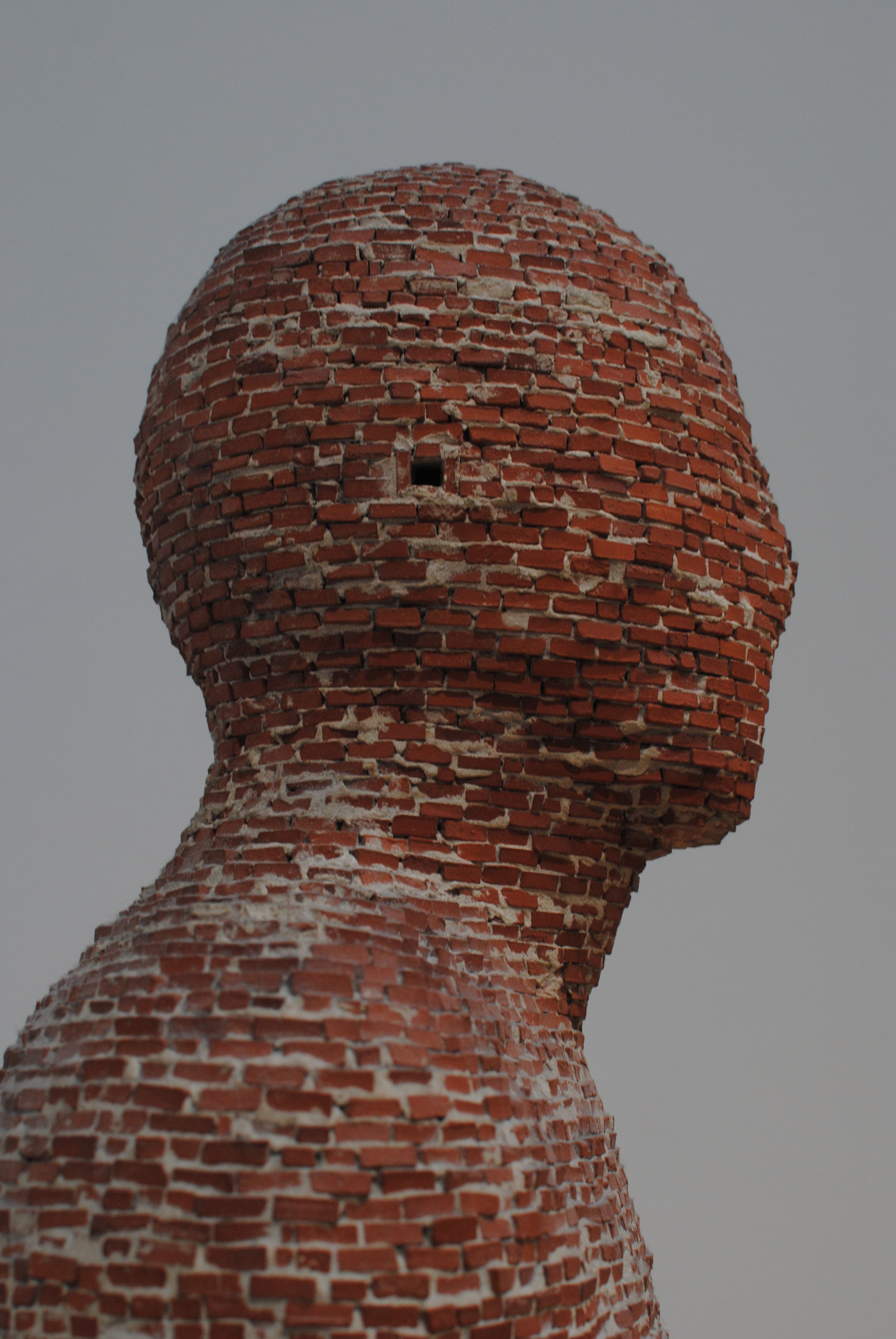
Hole in ear allowing viewing

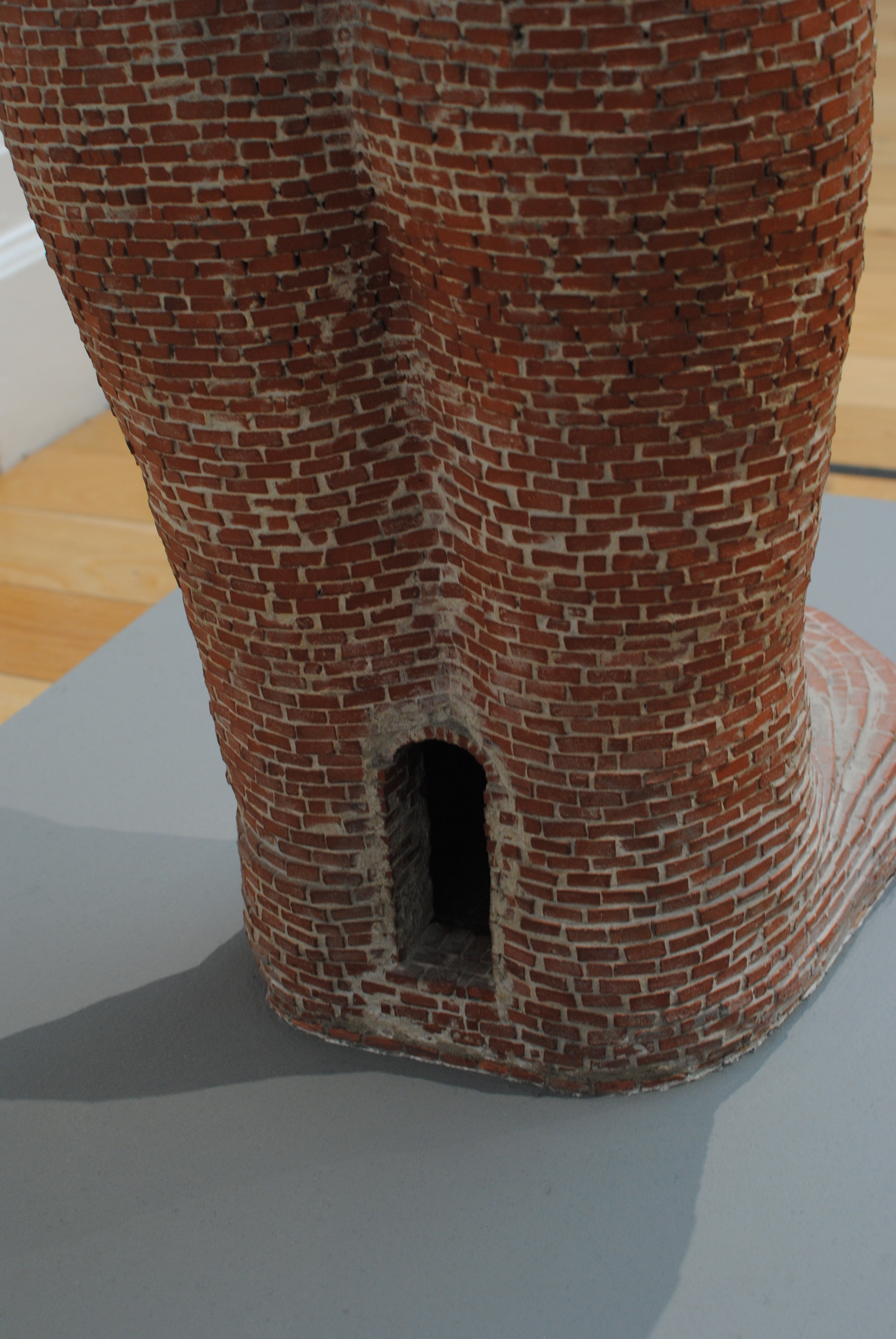
Entrance doorway in heels
