= Norton Disney =

Village and civil parish in England

Coordinates: 53.1204°N 0.6795°W

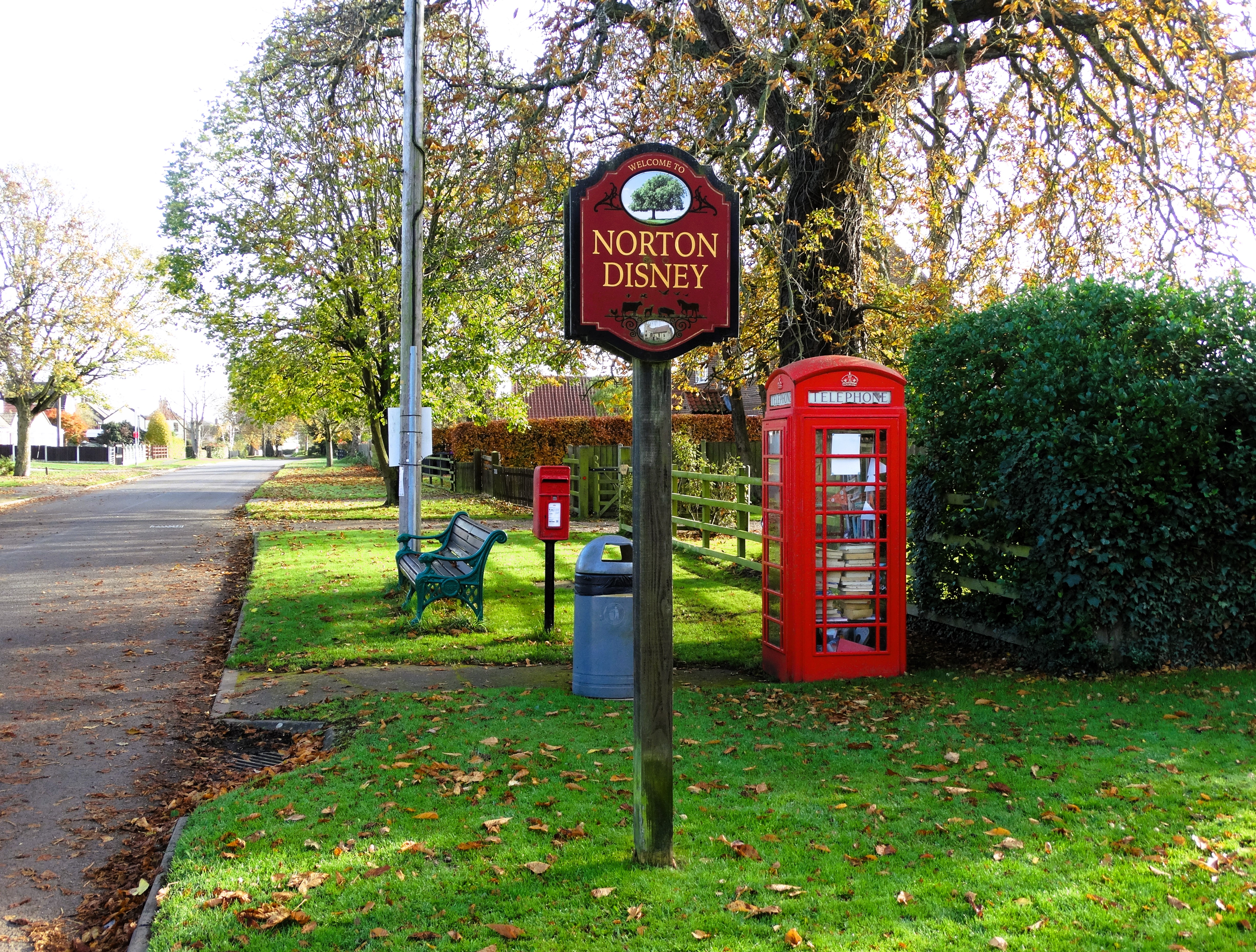
- Norton Disney’s main street

- Location within Lincolnshire
- Population: 226 (2011)
- OS grid reference: SK8859
  - London: 110 mi (180 km) S
- District: North Kesteven
- Shire county: Lincolnshire
- Region: East Midlands
- Country: England
- Sovereign state: United Kingdom
- Post town: LINCOLN
- Postcode district: LN6
- Police: Lincolnshire
- Fire: Lincolnshire
- Ambulance: East Midlands
- UK Parliament: Sleaford and North Hykeham

Norton Disney is a small village and civil parish on the western boundary of the North Kesteven district of Lincolnshire, England. It is situated on the border with the adjacent county of Nottinghamshire and shares a boundary with Collingham in that county. This county and parish boundary of Collingham and Norton Disney also splits the Potter Hill area which has important Iron Age and Roman archaeology. The population of the civil parish at the 2011 census was 226. It lies midway between Lincoln and Newark, 2 miles (3.2 km) to the south-east of the A46.

Norton Disney was one of the seats of the Disney family, whose name was an Anglicised version of the original French surname d'Isigny, of Isigny-sur-Mer, Normandy, from whom film producer Walt Disney's family might be descended. The Disney family were also lords of the manor in Swinderby, Carlton-le-Moorland and Kingerby.

The Church of England parish church, St Peter's, is a Grade I listed building. The village has one public house, The Green Man, formerly the St Vincent Arms.

== History ==
The Disney family were lords of the manor subsequent to the Norman Conquest in 1066; a charter of 1386 for Usselby, near Kingerby named a strip of land as "Disnayland". They continued to be lords of the manor up until 17th century. Within the medieval parish church of St Peter there are a number of memorials to the family. There is a commemorative brass in the church commemorating three generations of the d'Isigny or Disney family, installed in about 1580. In the bottom panel is an inscription reading:

"The lyfe, conversacion and Service, of the first above named William Disney and of Richard Disney his sonne were comendable amongest ther Neighbours trewe and fathefull to ther Prince and cuntre & acceptable Thallmighty of whom the truth they are received to Salvation accordinge to the Stedfast faythe which they had in & throughe the mercy and merit of Christ our savior Thees thuthes are thus sett for the that in all ages God maybe thankfully Glorified for thes and suche lyke his gracius benifites."

There have been at least two manor houses in Norton Disney: an original moated house opposite the church, now demolished, and a 17th-century replacement, sited off Main Road. Also an 18th-century remodelling.

The lordship of the manor subsequently passed on in the following two centuries with Lord St Vincent's estate, with the Brown family taking the title.

Norton Disney is also important in that William Stukeley, the antiquarian, visited Potter Hill in 1722. He described the site as having a Roman pottery and drew a view of the landscape taking in the Fosse Way, Potter Hill, Crococalana and Newark. This correctly linking Crococalana and the Fosse Way within the landscape with Potter Hill as Roman sites. The Roman town of Brough or Crocoalana, lies on the Fosse Way, just over the border in Nottinghamshire.

During the Second World War, RAF Swinderby (later renamed RAF Norton Disney) was home to No 93 Maintenance Unit (No 93 MU) from August 1939 until 1958. It was also a mustard gas filling station and required a site decontamination subsequently.

=== Norton Disney Roman Villa ===
In 1933 a Roman villa was discovered with two mosaic floors in the parish off Folly Lane. Subsequently excavated in 1934/5 the finds were taken to nearby Newark Museum. The villa site is a scheduled monument of national importance. The site in the following 80 years has revealed complex and a high density of both Middle Iron Age and Roman archaeology. Nearby Gallows Nooking Common, running alongside the A46 between Folly Lane and Hill Holt Wood, has an Iron Age and Roman British boundary bank and ditch. It has been excavated three times in 1991, 2001 and 2002 and is thought to be a boundary for the Roman villa. Villa Farm has also revealed through geophysical surveys and two excavations in 2019 and 2022 to be the site of Iron Age roundhouses and a Roman road that runs between North Scaffold Lane and the Roman villa.

The most famous archaeological object is a rare 3rd-century Gallo-Roman dodecahedron, discovered in the summer of 2023 by the local Norton Disney History and Archaeology Group. This find has subsequently featured on BBC’s Digging for Britain and has received international press coverage. It was described as "exceptional not just because it's the first to have been found in the Midlands, but also because it's a large, very finely-made example in excellent condition."

=== Air incidents ===
A Vickers Wellington crashed at 12.55am on Wednesday January 21 1948. Another Wellington crashed in late August 1949 at 2.30am. Flying Officer Raymond Cox survived.

=== Brills Farm Iron Age Hillfort ===
The fields to the east and south of the Roman villa had geophysical surveys carried out by the Norton Disney History and Archaeology Group in 2020. These surveys and the group’s subsequent excavations in 2021 and 2022 revealed a roundhouse site to the south of the villa. Also extensive evidence of iron smelting dated by XRF analysis to the Middle Iron Age. To the south of Villa Farm, next-door Brills Farm in a 2019 excavation showed evidence of Iron Age pottery. In 2023 an excavation near the farmstead confirmed it was a 2nd- to 3rd-century farming settlement. The farmstead itself has a ditch and banked enclosure feature which is potentially Iron Age in origin.

Close to the Lincolnshire boundary a Romano-British copper-alloy figurine of a horse and rider was discovered in 1989 by metal detectorists. This syncretic Romano-British deity was common in Lincolnshire in the 3rd and 4th centuries. The “Norton Disney Rider God” was donated to the British Museum.

== Visits ==
=== Walt Disney visit ===
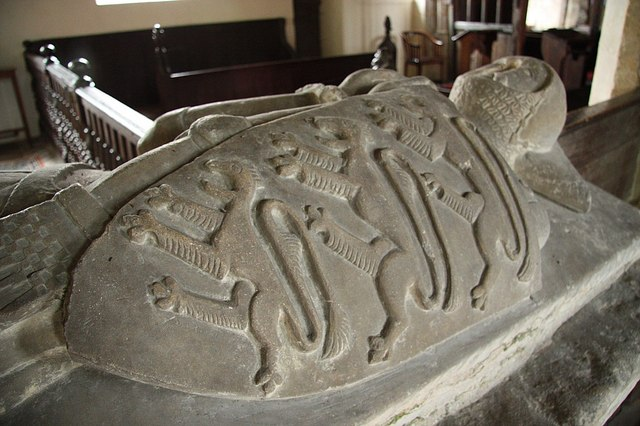
Effigy of Sir William D'Isney in St Peter’s Church. Since 2006, the three lions can be seen flying on the flag at the top of Cinderella Castle in the Walt Disney Pictures logo.

Walt Disney visited the village on the afternoon of Thursday 7 July 1949, in an attempt to trace his ancestry. The visit is recorded in the British magazine Illustrated.

Disney had been in the UK from 20 June 1949, arriving at Southampton on RMS Queen Elizabeth; he embarked on a six-day motoring holiday with his two teenage daughters, Diane and Sharon, and his wife, with a convoy of cars. After seeing the village, he left for a night at Boroughbridge in North Yorkshire, later visiting 8 Howard Place in Edinburgh on 8 July. He visited Loch Ness. Disney also planned to visit the Derbyshire Peaks, Stratford-upon-Avon, the Scottish Highlands, and Burns country. He later stayed at Drumnadrochit Hotel in Drumnadrochit.

Disney spoke to the vicar, Rev R. K. Roper, who said that Disney was a 'charming unaffected person'. The Rev Roper had attended St John's College, Durham in the late 1920s, being ordained in 1930, and became a curate at Holy Trinity, Gainsborough from 1932, then became chaplain and teacher at Chigwell School in Essex from April 1934; in March 1948 he became the Rural Dean of the Deanery of Graffoe, and later moved to St Andrew at Chardstock in east Devon, on July 14 1958. He later worked with the Henry Bradshaw Society in the 1960s.

Disney's daughters had decided that their father had been working too hard, and needed a rest.

His film Treasure Island was being filmed at Denham Film Studios from 4 July 1949, being also filmed at Falmouth and Hartland Quay at Bideford, in Devon, from 4 July 1949 on the Ryelands 158-ton schooner, owned by Plym Shipping Line, for three weeks. It was the first film that Disney had made abroad.

In 2023, Disney historian Sebastien Durand commented on Norton Disney and its connection to Walt Disney: "This is the oldest place in England where you can find a trace of Disney, of Walt Disney's history and his family tree and even his coat of arms. The name comes from here. The exact possibility that Walt Disney is related to that is, I would say, 99%."

=== Prince Charles visit ===
The Prince of Wales visited the Hill Holt Wood social enterprise in January 2009, and later visited Brant Broughton.

== See also ==
- Lost Village Festival
- On Freedom's Wings
