= On Freedom's Wings =

Bomber Command memorial in Lincolnshire, England

- On Freedom's Wings

General information
- Location: Norton Disney, Lincolnshire, England
- Coordinates: SK 8571 5977
- Year built: 2025
- Completed: 8 September 2025

Technical details
- Material: Steel

On Freedom's Wings is a life-size model of a Avro Lancaster bomber in Lincolnshire, England.

Installation nearly complete in September 2025

The structure was unveiled in September 2025, and is next to the A46 road in Norton Disney, Lincolnshire, between Newark-on-Trent and Lincoln, near RAF Swinderby, a former RAF Bomber Command station. It was erected by the Bomber County Gateway Trust, formed with the object of designing, procuring, constructing and installing an iconic landmark art installation on the county border of Nottinghamshire and Lincolnshire, as a result of a project that began in 2018. Lincolnshire became known as "bomber county" after the Second World War, with the county hosting nearly 70 airfields.

The £1 million artwork rivals the Angel of the North in scale. Construction was by Lincolnshire-based Timmins Engineering and Construction Ltd.

== See also ==
- RAF Bomber Command Memorial
- International Bomber Command Centre
