= Lost Village Festival =

Annual British festival experience

Lost Village is an annual festival experience that takes place since 2015 in a woodland near the village of Norton Disney, Lincolnshire, England. Festivalgoers are invited to explore buildings, gardens, and an airbase. The four-day event focuses on music, art, food, theatre, comedy, talks, and workshops.

== History ==
Lost Village was founded in 2015 by Andy George, Jay Jameson, Ben Atkins, and Andy Ellis.

== Location ==
The festival is set near the English village of Norton Disney, Lincolnshire. There is public transport to the site.

== Activities ==
Apart from music, Lost Village includes comedy, talks, various types of creative workshops, as well as interactive spaces to explore.

The "Energy Garden", situated by a lake, offers wellness activities including wood-fired hot tubs, Finnish saunas, yoga sessions, and sound therapy. The festival hosts workshops in various craft disciplines, including screen printing, clothing customization, and wood crafts. The "Institute of Curious Minds" presents talks and discussions with cultural figures, while "the Lost Theatre" hosts comedy performances. Interactive elements include immersive theatre performances throughout the woodland setting and a vintage market. The festival's culinary program consists of the "Table in the Woods", a 30-seat table featuring Michelin-starred chefs, communal "Forest Banquets", and various food vendors. In 2016, Michael O'Hare and Typing Room's Lee Westcott were chefs at the event.
