= Maquette =

Scale model of unfinished sculpture

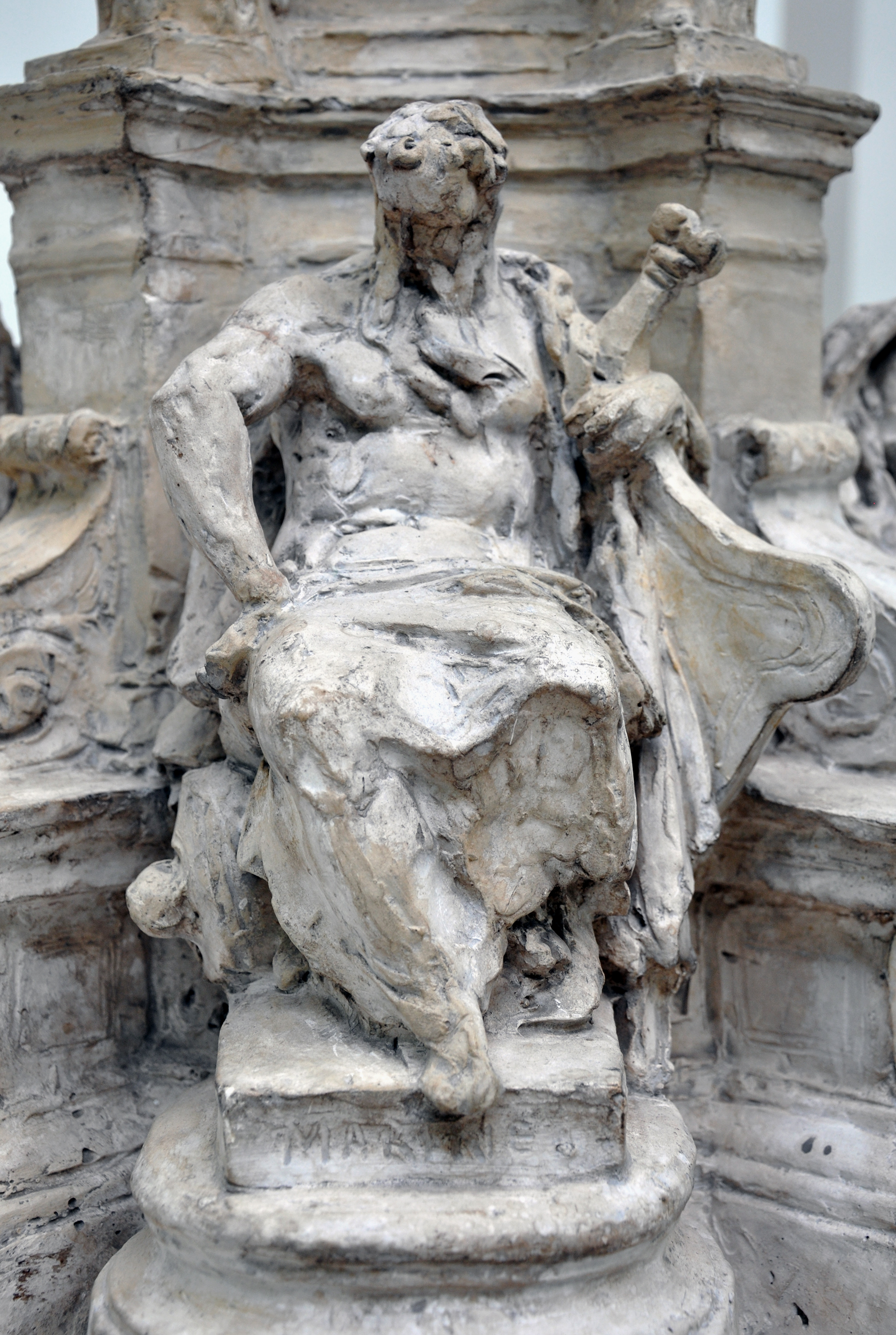
Jean-Baptiste Carpeaux's maquette for the fountain he donated to Valenciennes.

A maquette is a scale model or rough draft of an unfinished sculpture or work of architecture. The term is a loanword from French. An equivalent term is bozzetto, a diminutive of the Italian word for a sketch.

== Sculpture ==
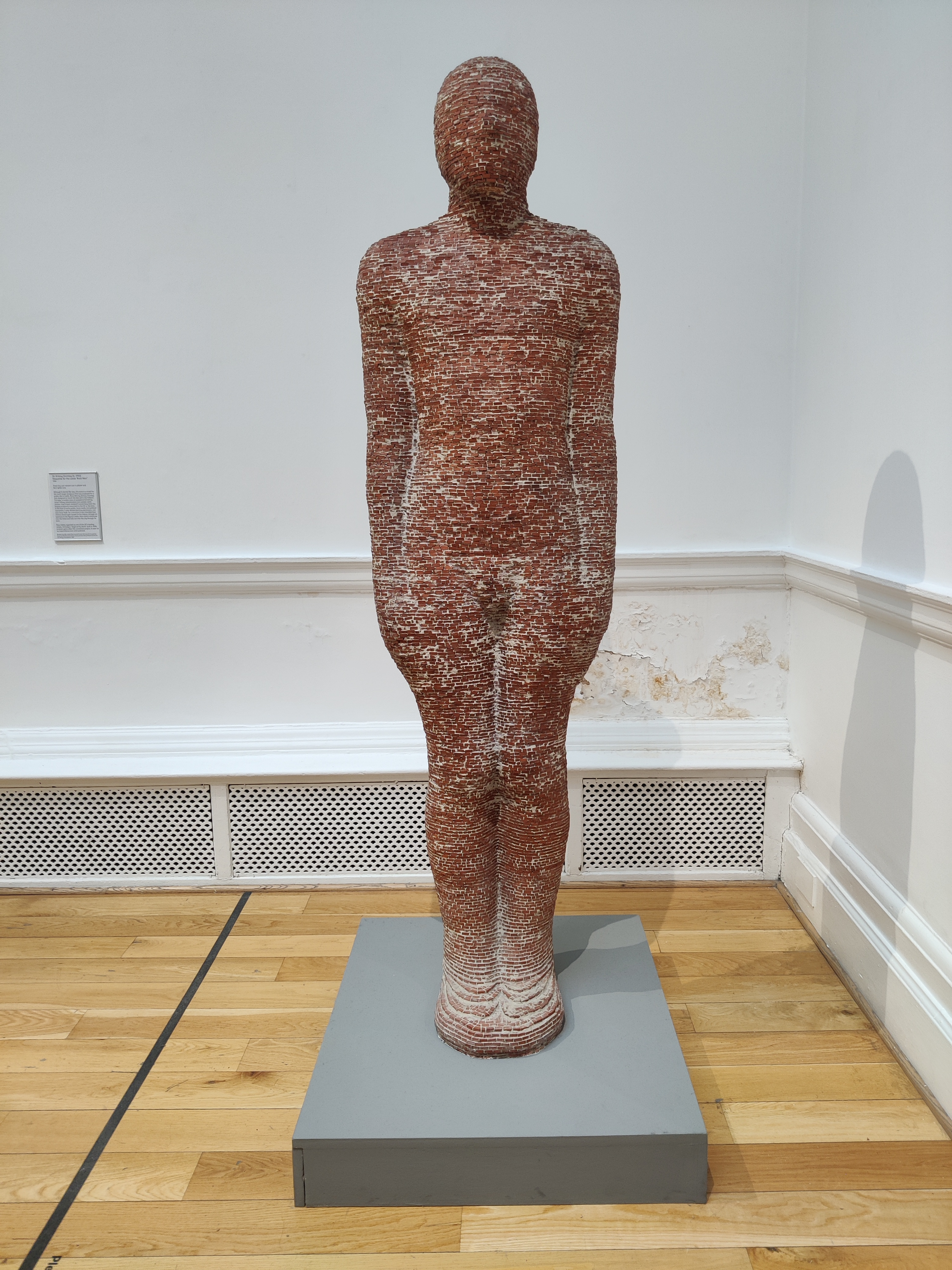
Maquette for Antony Gormley's proposed 120 feet (37 m) tall Brick Man sculpture, at Leeds City Art Gallery. The work was never commissioned.

A maquette is used to visualize and test forms and ideas without incurring the expense and effort of producing a full-scale piece. It is the analogue of the painter's cartoon, modello, oil sketch, or drawn sketch. For commissioned works, especially monumental public sculptures, a maquette may be used to show the client how the finished work will relate to its proposed site. The term may also refer to a prototype for a video game, film, or other media. Modello, unlike the other terms, is also used for sketches for two-dimensional works such as paintings. Like oil sketches, these models by highly regarded artists can become as desirable as their completed works, as they show the process of developing an idea. For example, eleven bozzetti by Gian Lorenzo Bernini, a Baroque sculptor who made his models from wax or baked terracotta, were displayed in an exhibition at the Art Institute of Chicago in 2004. Some museums, such as the Museo dei Bozzetti in Pietrasanta, Italy, specialize in collections of maquettes. Maquette is also used by animators when finalizing a character design and it can also act as reference for the animators.

== Fashion ==
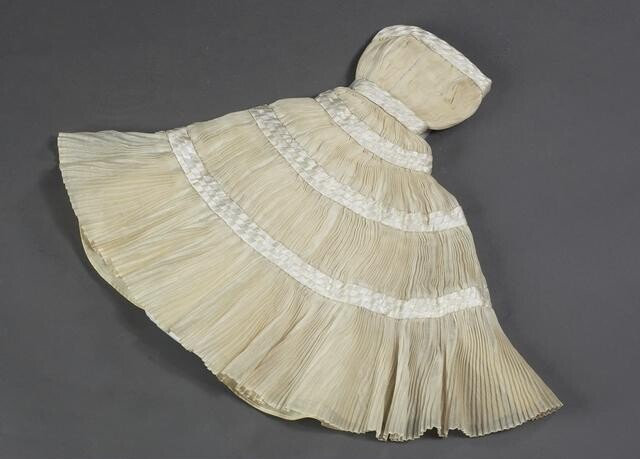
Maquette for 'First Love' designed by Sybil Connolly.

In fashion design, a maquette may be referred to as a fashion doll. From the 16th century, these miniature versions of full-scale costumes were intended to demonstrate the latest trends and designs and allow customers to view the garment before purchasing.

In the 1950s, Irish fashion designer Sybil Connolly created a series of maquettes based on her designs including her iconic pleated linen dress First Love. These are now found in the Hunt Museum.

== See also ==
- Fashion doll
- Mockup
