= International Bomber Command Centre =

World War II interpretation centre and memorial

Coordinates: 53.2139°N 0.53095°W

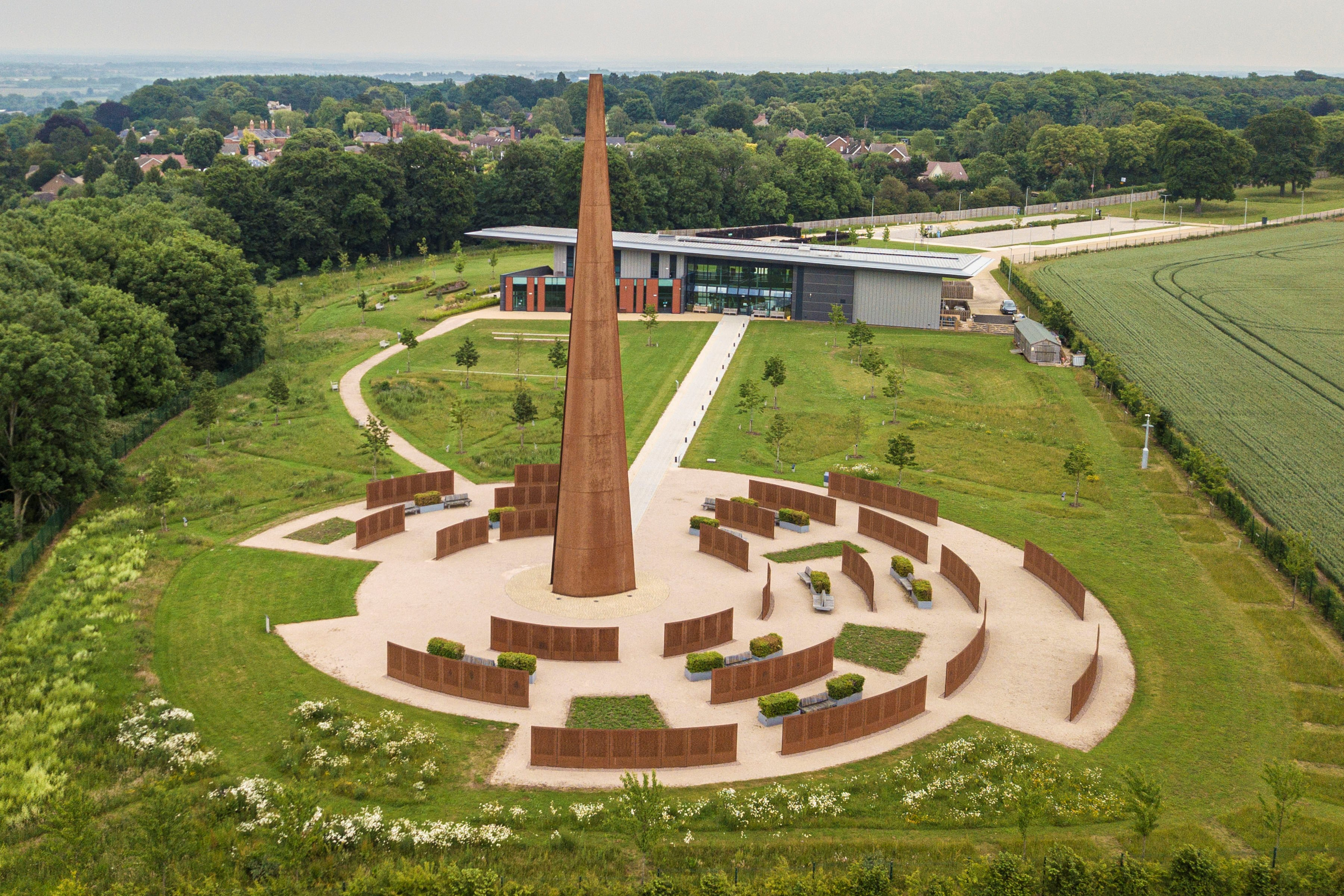
- Memorial spire at the IBCC
- Abbreviation: IBCC
- Formation: 2011
- Type: Charity
- Purpose: To relate the stories and experiences of the personnel and support staff of Bomber Command.
- Headquarters: Lincoln, UK
- Main organ: Lincolnshire Bomber Command Memorial
- Affiliations: University of Lincoln
- Staff: 22
- Volunteers: 648
- Website: Official website

The International Bomber Command Centre (IBCC) is a memorial and interpretation centre overlooking the city of Lincoln, England, and telling the story of RAF Bomber Command's extensive losses of aircraft and crews during the Bombing of Germany during World War II. It opened to the public at the end of January 2018, with an official ceremony on 12 April as part of Royal Air Force (RAF) centenary celebrations.

== Lincolnshire Bomber Command Memorial ==
=== Objectives ===
The project was created to act as a point of "recognition, remembrance and reconciliation for Bomber Command".

IBCC aims to tell the personal stories of service men and women of RAF Bomber Command, ground crews and civilians affected by the bombing campaigns on both sides of the conflict during the Second World War and beyond to the Cold War era. The centre provides a comprehensive record of the role of Bomber Command's squadrons and digitally displays historical documents and photographs relating to the activity of Bomber Command, in an interactive and immersive exhibition.

=== Digital archive ===
The IBCC has created a digital archive in partnership with the University of Lincoln. The IBCC Digital Archive includes material on the bombing of Europe from both Allied and Axis forces and civilians, primarily through material donated through private collections, including oral interviews and memorabilia. As of 2026, the archive holds over 43,000 items spanning over 2,000 collections.

=== Losses database ===
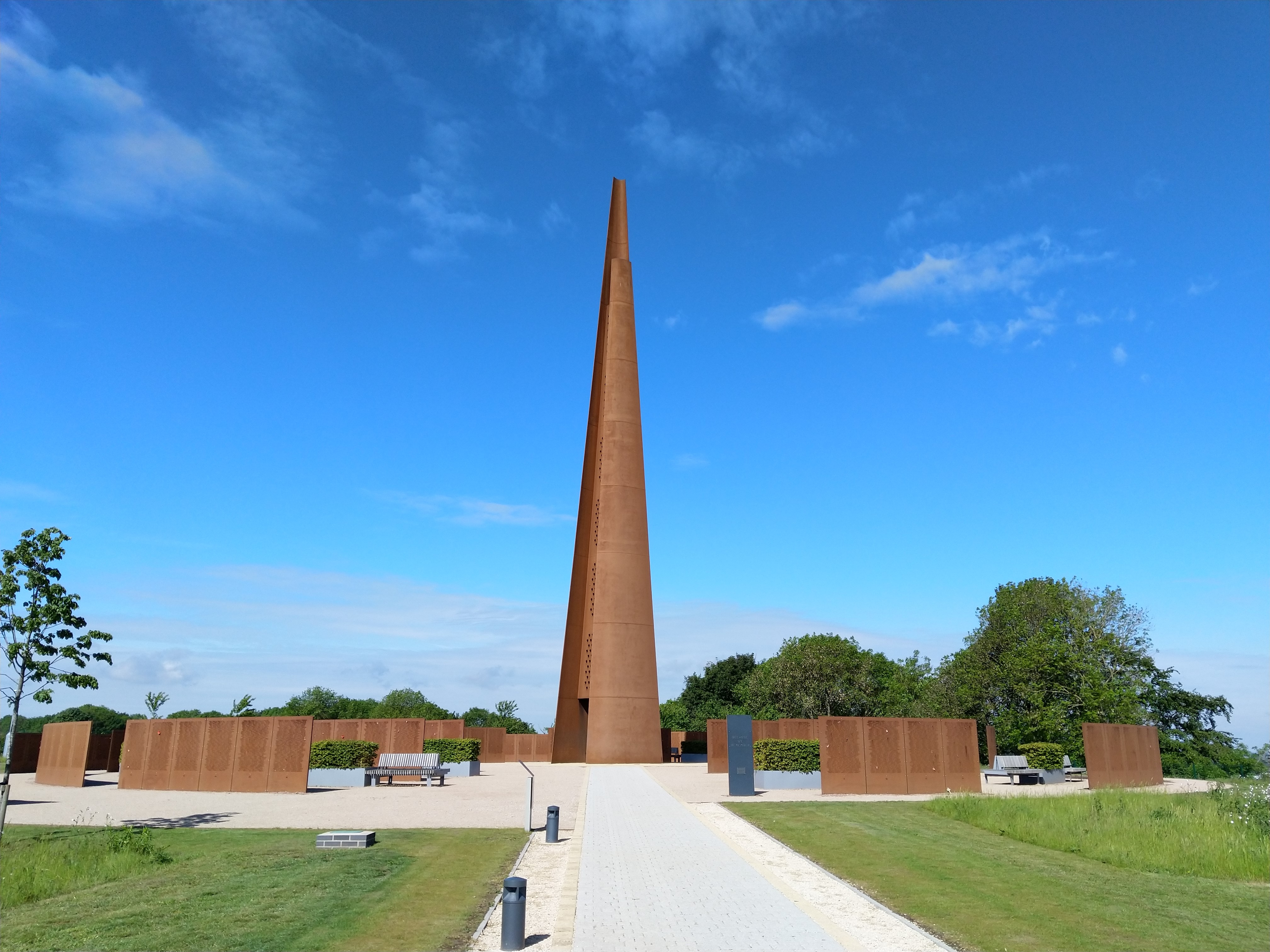
The Spire

The IBCC has a comprehensive record of Bomber Command losses from 1936 to 1968 and includes details of people, their crews, how they died and any available photographs.

== Canwick Hill site ==
Located on Canwick Hill, the centre is just under two and half miles from RAF Waddington, which suffered the greatest losses of any Bomber Command station, and close to the former Avro aircraft production facility at Bracebridge Heath. A view of Lincoln Cathedral, a prominent landmark for aircrews, forms an important part of the vista from the centre of the Memorial Spire.

Within the grounds of the International Bomber Command Centre sits the Spire Memorial, which was erected on 10 May 2015.

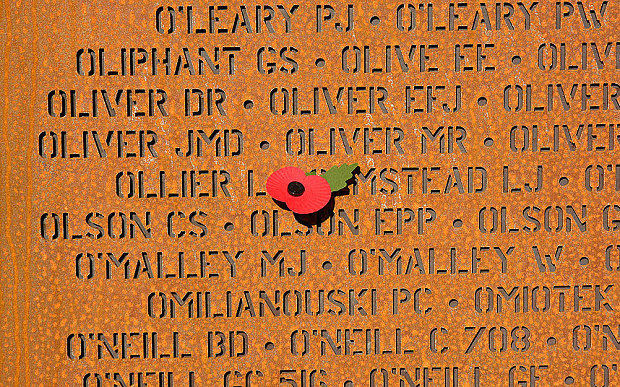
Plates bear the names of aircrew who lost their lives flying from bases in Lincolnshire.

== Gallery ==
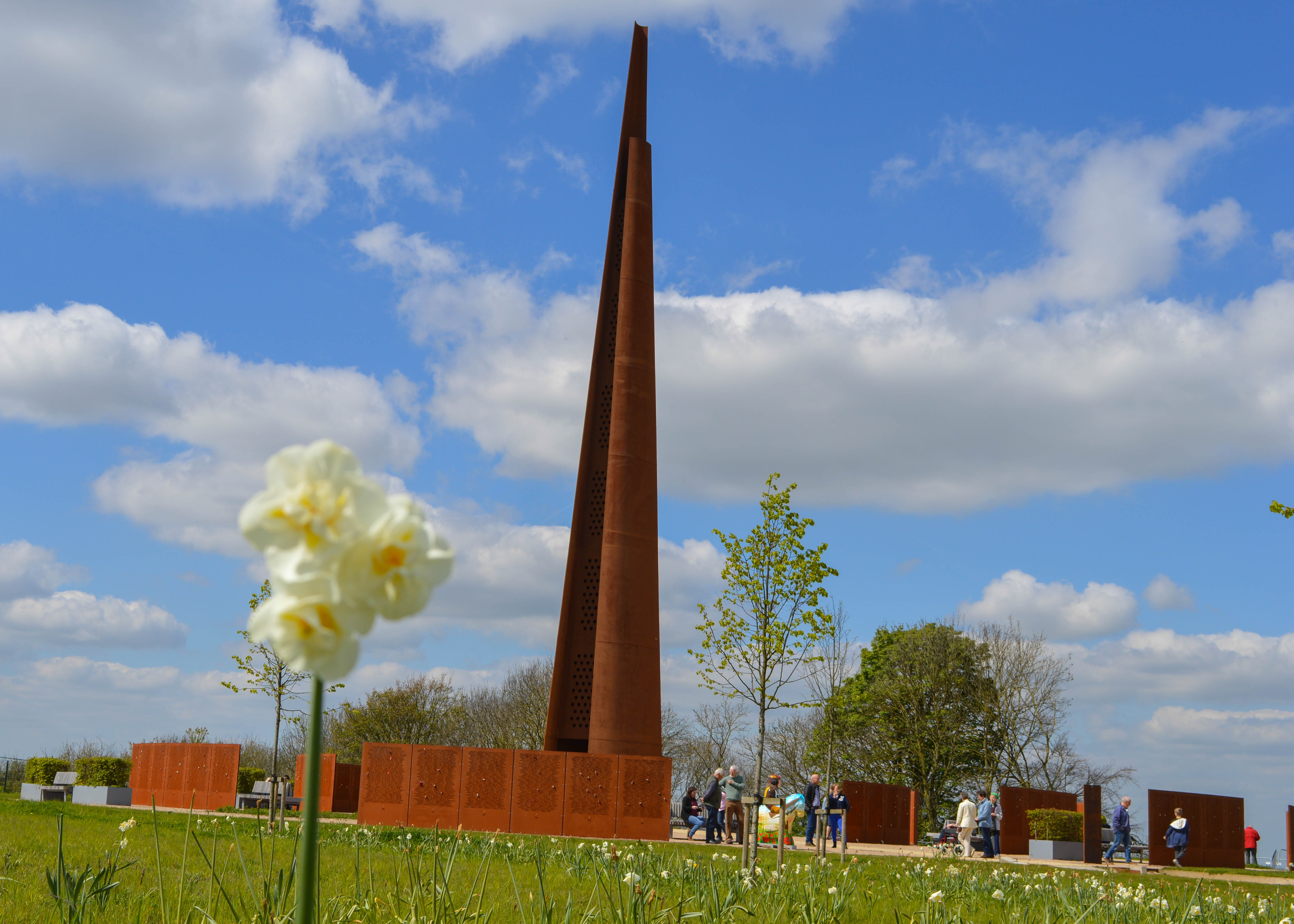
The memorial spire

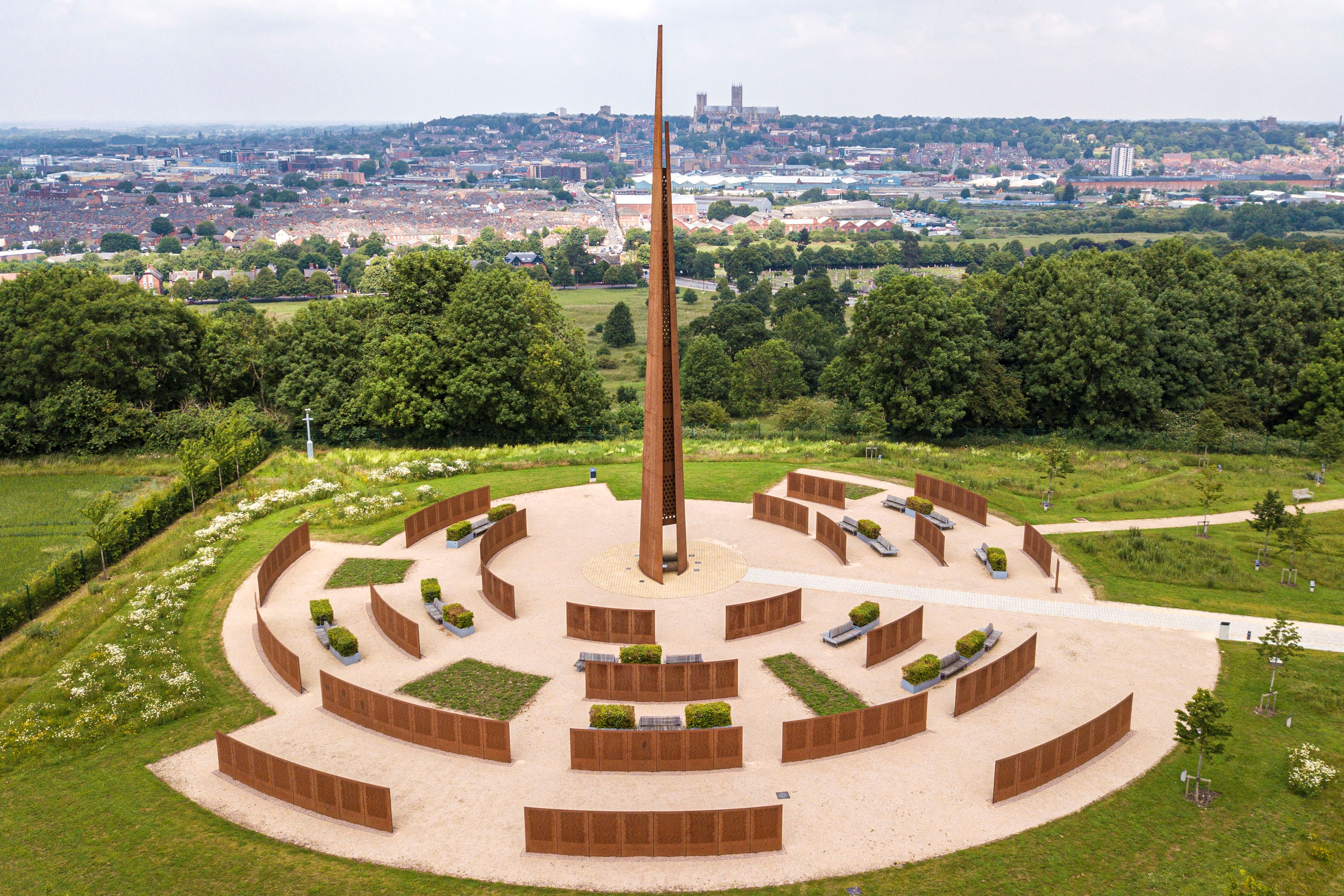
Aerial view of the Memorial Spire and Walls overlooking Lincoln Cathedral

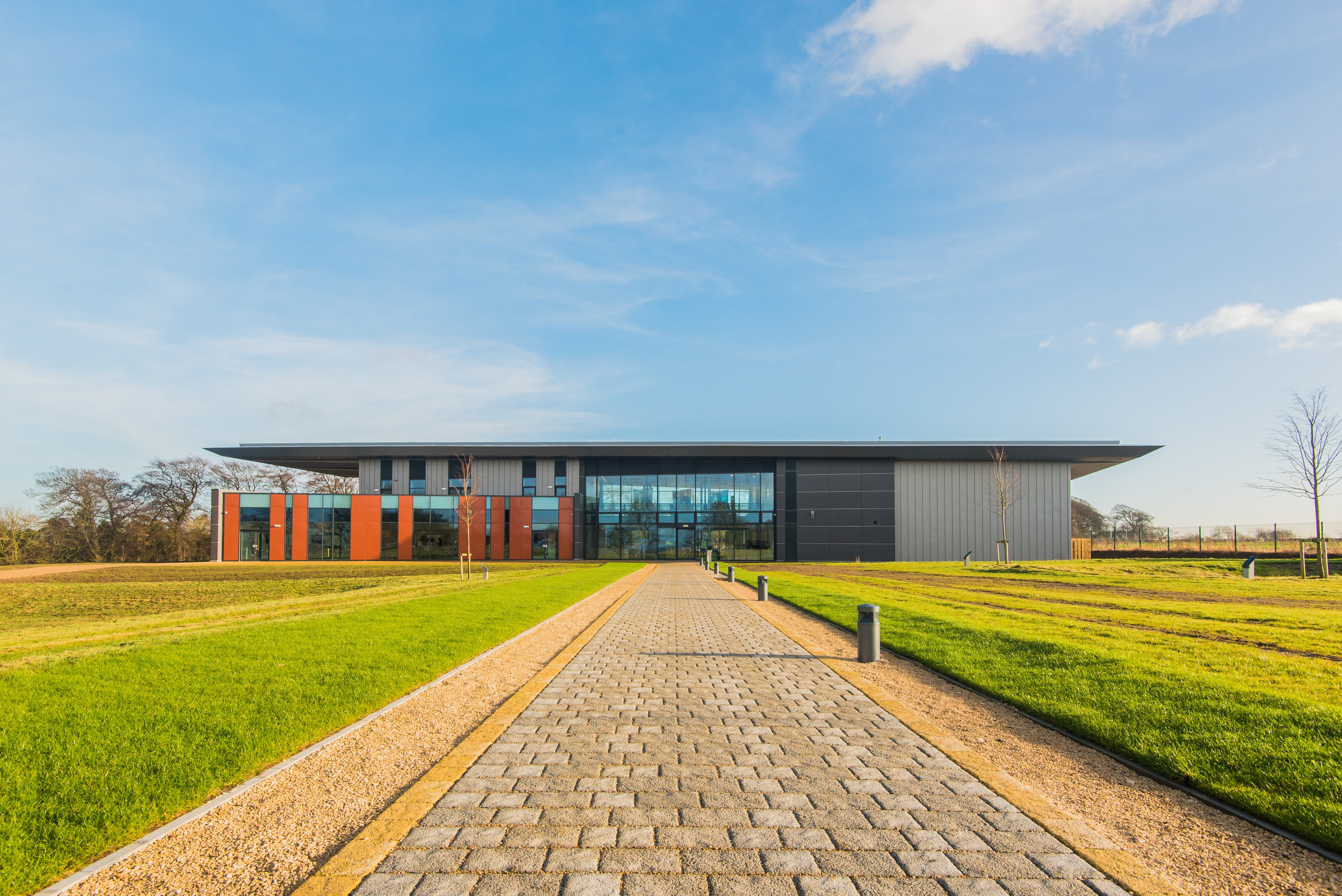
The visitor centre is named after Roy Chadwick, the designer of the Lancaster Bomber

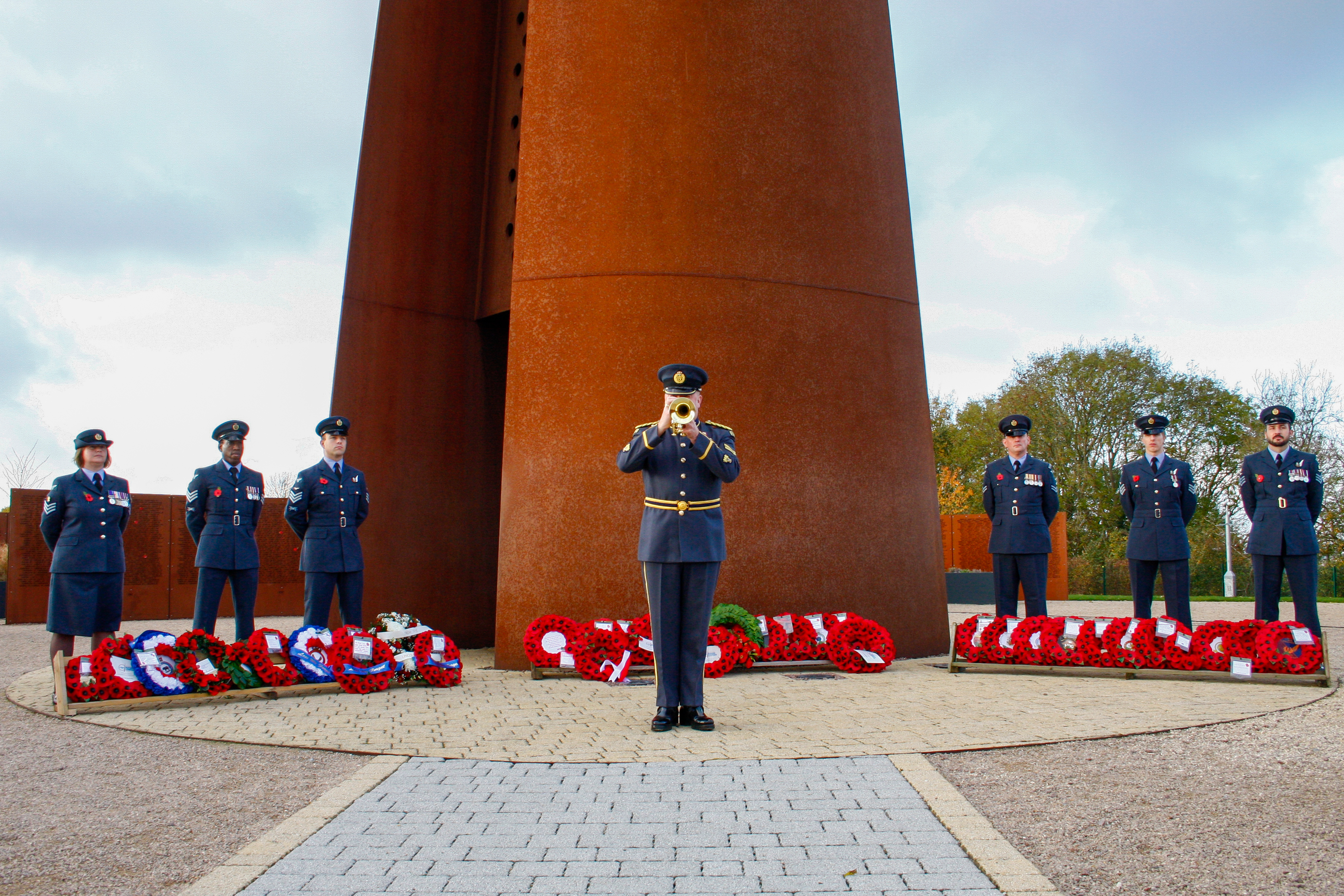
Remembrance Service, 2021

== See also ==
- RAF Bomber Command Memorial
- On Freedom's Wings
