= Michael Dennis =

Michael or Mike Dennis may refer to:

- Michael Aaron Dennis, American author
- Michael J. Dennis, African-American filmmaker and film promoter
- Michael Dennis (artist) (born 1944), Canadian-American artist
- Michael Dennis (skier) (born 1944), New Zealand Olympic skier
- Mike Dennis (running back) (born 1944), American football player
- Mike Dennis (defensive back) (born 1958), American football player
- Mick Dennis (born 1952), sportswriter

== See also ==
- Michael Denis (1729–1800), Austrian poet
