= World Cup Sculpture =

Sculpture in London

The World Cup Sculpture The Champions
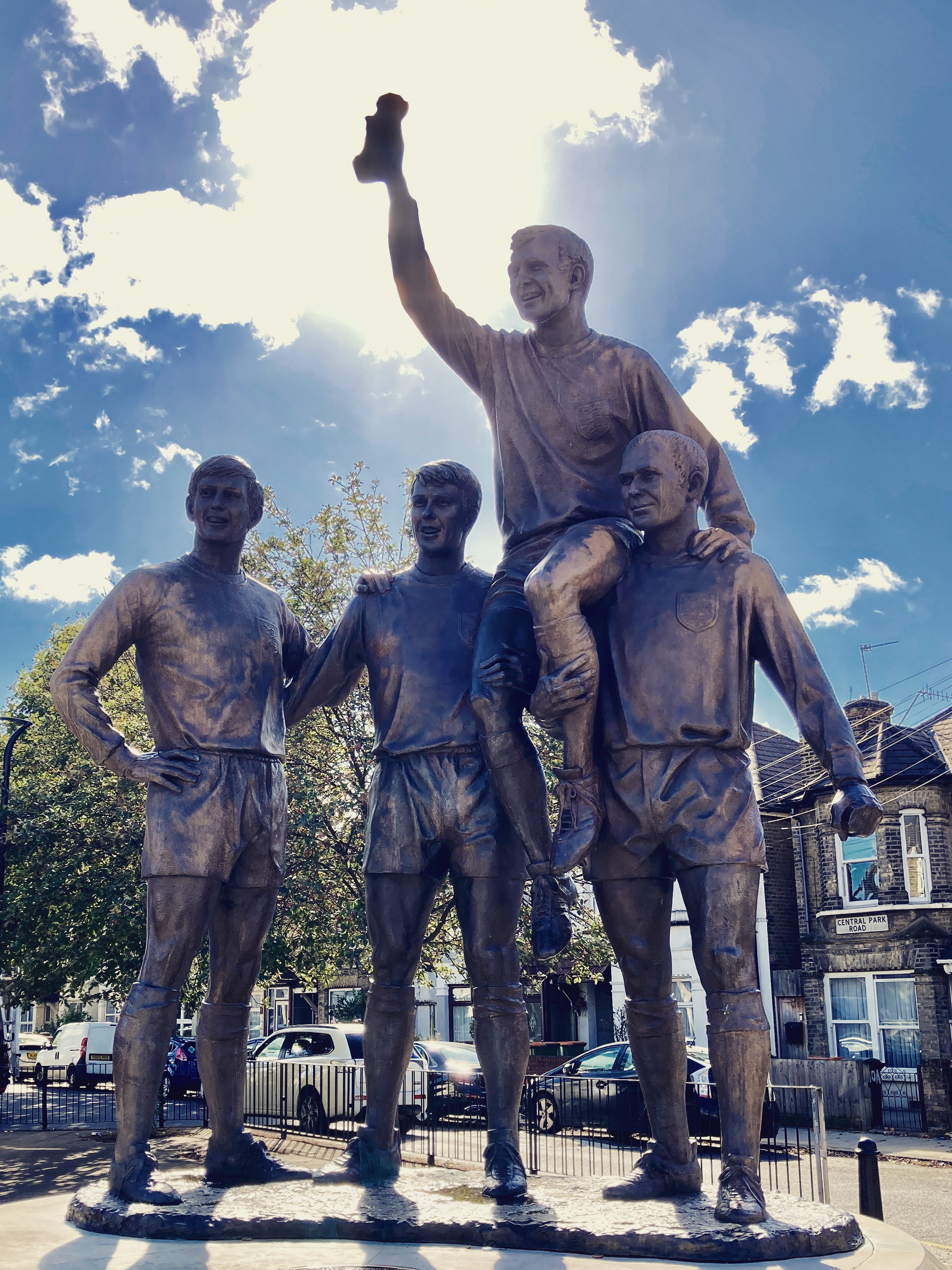
- Interactive map of The World Cup Sculpture; The Champions
- Location: Near the site of Boleyn Ground (Upton Park), the former home of West Ham United
- Coordinates: 51°31′48.43″N 0°2′16.5″E
- Designer: Philip Jackson
- Type: statue
- Material: bronze sculpture
- Height: 16 feet (4.9 m)
- Beginning date: 2001
- Completion date: 2003
- Opening date: 28 April 2003
- Dedicated to: England's 1966 World Cup Final victory

The World Cup Sculpture, or simply The Champions, is a bronze statue of the 1966 World Cup final located near the site of West Ham United Football Club's former Boleyn Ground (Upton Park) stadium in the London Borough of Newham, England. It depicts a famous victory scene photographed after the final, held at the old Wembley Stadium in London, featuring Bobby Moore, Geoff Hurst, Martin Peters and Ray Wilson. It remains the only time the England national football team have won the World Cup, and England captain Moore is pictured held shoulder high by his colleagues, holding the Jules Rimet Trophy aloft.

Jointly commissioned by Newham Council and West Ham United, the statue stands at the junction of Barking Road and Green Street, near the former location of the Boleyn Ground. It commemorates West Ham's contribution to the victory, with Moore, Hurst and Peters having all been West Ham players at the time of the 1966 World Cup. Sculpted by the Royal Sculptor Philip Jackson, it was unveiled in 2003 by Prince Andrew, president of the Football Association. Jackson went on to also sculpt the statue of Bobby Moore unveiled at the new Wembley when it opened in 2007.

== Statue ==
The work, titled by Jackson as The Champions or The World Cup Sculpture, is a one-and-a-half times life-size bronze piece, 16 feet (4.9 m) tall, weighing four tonnes. It stands in a prominent location at the junction of Barking Road (the A124) and Green Street in the London Borough of Newham, close to the former home stadium of West Ham, the Boleyn Ground (commonly called Upton Park).

== Inspiration ==
The statue was inspired by the victory scenes in the immediate aftermath of the 1966 World Cup final. Moore, Hurst, Peters and Wilson had just been part of the England side which defeated West Germany in a famous 4–2 extra time victory over Germany in the final held on home soil, at the old 1923 built Wembley stadium (since replaced by the new Wembley Stadium opened in 2007).

In that final, Moore was the team captain and a central defender, while Wilson served as full back alongside him. Peters in midfield, and Hurst as one of the strikers, were the England goalscorers on the day of the final, with Hurst scoring the first goal in the first half, Peters scoring in the second half, and Hurst scoring two more in extra time to complete a famous World Cup hat-trick and secure victory.

Jackson used as his subject material a series of photographs taken during a 12-second period after the game. In a scene described by the Football Association as "one of the enduring post-match images", Moore was pictured holding the Jules Rimet World Cup Trophy jubilantly above his head, while he himself is being held shoulder high by Hurst and Wilson, while Peters completes the scene.

Jackson exercised some artistic license to not depict Ray Wilson's expression entirely accurately, as in reality he had been grimacing in the photo due to taking most of Moore's weight, stating "I didn't think he would mind". Wilson, described by the FA as a "normally reserved" man, later remarked of the events depicted, "Nearly all the other players were off celebrating around the pitch and they just needed someone to help lift Bobby, otherwise I would not have been there, believe me. I'd have been doing my own celebrating"

== History ==
=== Commissioning ===
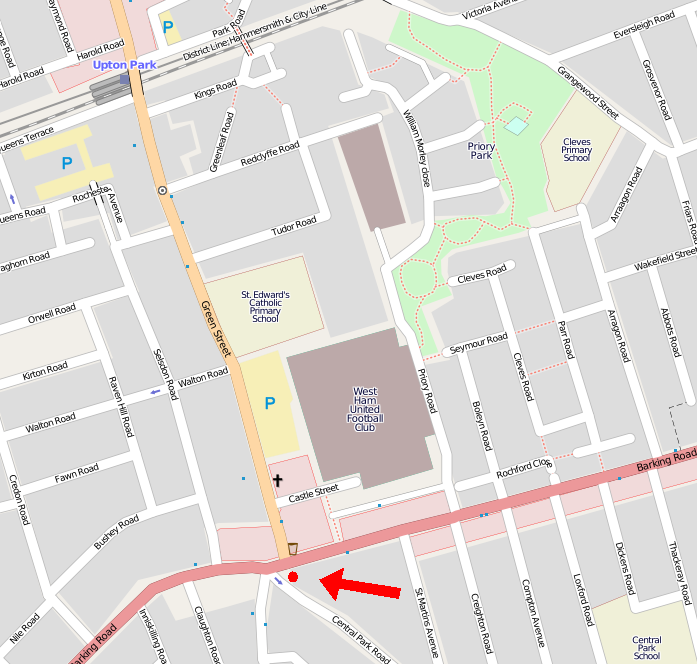
Location of the statue, in relation to Upton Park station and the Boleyn Ground

The statue was commissioned jointly by West Ham United and Newham London Borough Council, where the club resides. At the time of the final, Moore, Hurst and Peters were all West Ham players, while Wilson was with Everton F.C. The statue was the idea of Newham councillor Graeme Cambage. He said of the project after the unveiling, "After Bobby Moore died, I thought there ought to be a statue of him but it's taken a long time to realise my dream".

The statue cost £725,000 in all, with £400,000 coming from a Government grant, and the bulk of the remainder from the football club. The cost included associated street improvements. Contributions also came from the Green Street Single Regeneration Budget, the Arts Council for England, and Arts & Business.

=== Production ===
The project was announced on 18 October 2001 by Newham Council leader Sir Robin Wales and West Ham chairman Terry Brown, during a ceremony at Newham Town Hall at which Hurst, Peters and Wilson viewed a miniature model of the proposed statue. The statue itself took a year to complete.

=== Unveiling ===
The statue was unveiled on 28 April 2003 by Prince Andrew, Duke of York, president of the Football Association. The plan to have the Duke of York unveil the statue was announced on 24 February 2003, on the tenth anniversary of Moore's death from cancer, aged 51.

Hurst, Peters and Wilson were joined by Moore's widow Stephanie at the unveiling. In the midst of a public campaign to give Moore the recognition of a British honour, rarely given posthumously, Prince Andrew inadvertently referred to Moore as "Sir Bobby" during the ceremony.

=== Proposed move ===
When West Ham departed Upton Park for the London Stadium in 2016, it was proposed that the statue be moved to a site in the Queen Elizabeth Olympic Park. However, difficulties in gaining the approval of all the concerned parties led to a reversal of the decision, with Newham Council announcing in 2018 that the statue would remain in its original location. As a result, in August 2020 West Ham announced the commissioning of a new statue for the London Stadium, featuring Moore, Hurst and Peters in a similar pose, this time from the night of the club's victory in the 1965 European Cup Winners' Cup Final.

== Reception ==
Paul Hayward, writing in The Daily Telegraph in 2003, described it as "stunning", and that it "radiates golden light and transforms a mundane road junction into a shrine both to England's finest hour and West Ham's contribution to the game in these isles".

Mick Dennis, writing for the Daily Mirror, was critical of the work, stating the statues did not resemble the players.

== See also ==
- List of public art in the London Borough of Newham
