= List of public art in the London Borough of Brent =

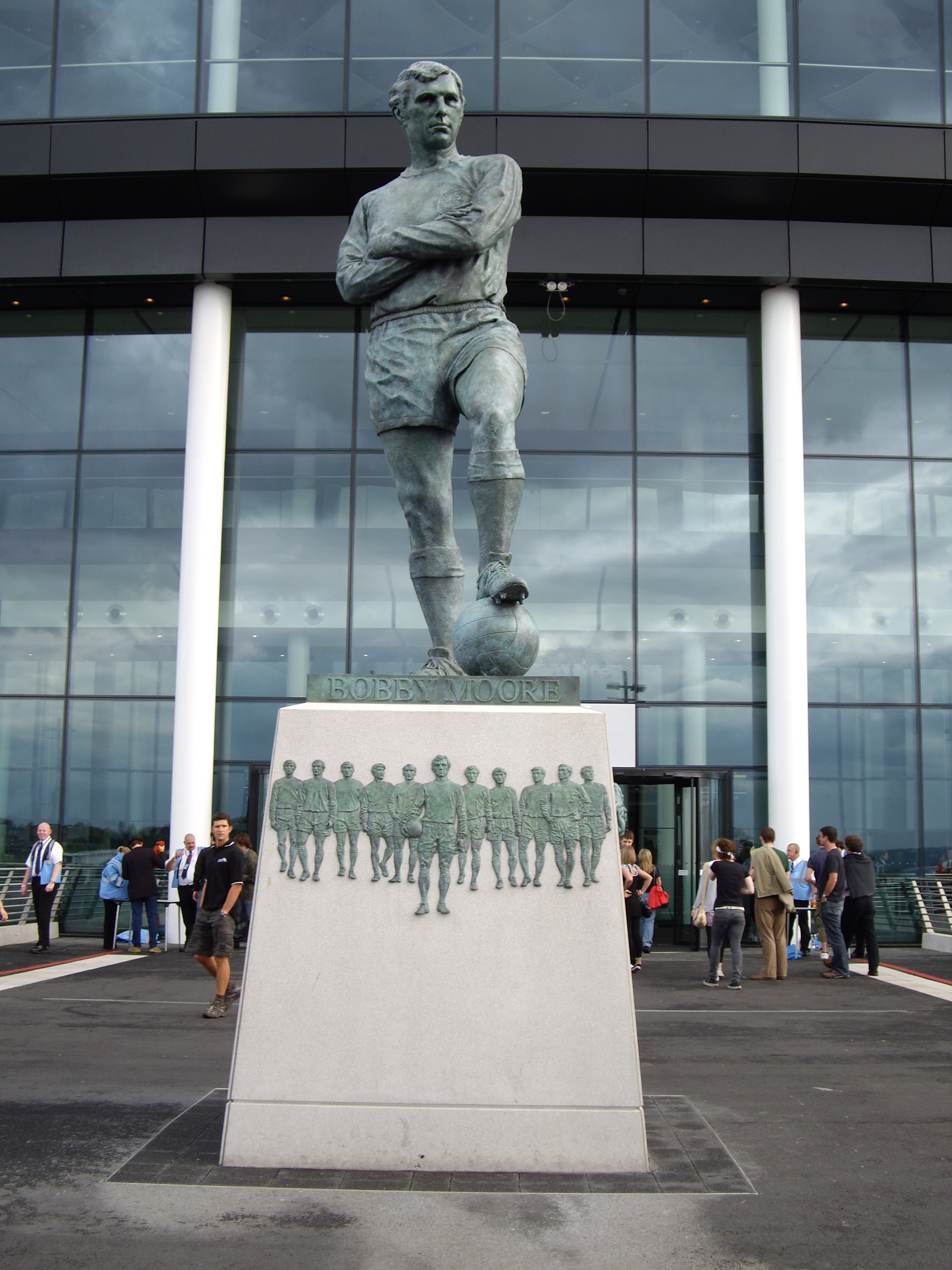
The statue of Bobby Moore at Wembley Stadium

This is a list of public art in the London Borough of Brent.

== Dollis Hill ==
Image	Title / subject	Location and coordinates	Date	Artist / designer	Type	Designation	Notes
More images	Memorial to prisoners of war and victims of concentration camps, 1914–1945	Gladstone Park 51.5595°N 0.2409°W	c. 1967–1969	Fred Kormis	Sculptural group	Grade II	Unveiled 11 May 1969.
	Map panels	Dollis Hill tube station	1995	Amanda Duncan	Enamel panels	—N/a	
	The Anchor, The Drum, The Ship	Gladstone Park	2022	Harun Morrison	Installation	—N/a	Unveiled 14 October 2022. Represents the ties of William Ewart Gladstone (after whom the park is named) to slavery.

== Kenton ==
Image	Title / subject	Location and coordinates	Date	Artist / designer	Architect / other	Type	Designation	Notes
	Christ	All Saints' Church, Kenton Road	c. 1963	?	J. E. Sterrett & Partners	Architectural sculpture	—N/a	

== Kilburn ==
Image	Title / subject	Location and coordinates	Date	Artist / designer	Architect / other	Type	Designation	Notes
	Memorial to animal victims of World War I	The Animals War Memorial Dispensary, 10 Cambridge Avenue	1932	Frederick Brook Hitch	John Oliver Brook Hitch	Relief	Grade II	

== Neasden ==
Image	Title / subject	Location and coordinates	Date	Artist / designer	Type	Material	Dimensions	Designation	Notes
	Temple Gateway	Meadow Garth, at main entrance to BAPS Shri Swaminarayan Mandir London 51.54827°N 0.2607°W	1995	Various Indian architects	Gateway	Stone			

== Sudbury ==
Image	Title / subject	Location and coordinates	Date	Artist / designer	Type	Designation	Notes
	Pleasure's Inaccuracies	Sudbury Town tube station	2020	Lucy McKenzie	Ceiling murals, billboards and an architectural model	—N/a	

== Wembley ==
Image	Title / subject	Location and coordinates	Date	Artist / designer	Type	Material	Dimensions	Designation	Notes
More images	Statue of Bobby Moore	Wembley Stadium 51.55752°N 0.27959°W	2007	Philip Jackson	Statue	Bronze	610cm (20ft)	—N/a	
More images	Man Catching a Star	Brook Avenue, near entrance to Wembley Park tube station 51.56268°N 0.28028°W	1996	Danny Lane	Statue	Steel	600 cm (19.7ft)	—N/a	
	Rugby League Legends Martin Offiah, Alex Murphy, Gus Risman, Billy Boston and Eric Ashton	Wembley Stadium	2015	Stephen Winterburn	Sculptural group			—N/a	Erected to mark the 120th anniversary of rugby league.

== Willesden ==
Image	Title / subject	Location and coordinates	Date	Artist / designer	Type	Material	Dimensions	Designation	Notes
	The Spirit of Youth	Roundwood Park	1966	Freda Skinner	Sculpture				

== Bibliography ==
- Matthews, Peter (2018). London's Statues and Monuments. Oxford: Shire Publications.
