= Statue of Bobby Moore =

Statue in London, England

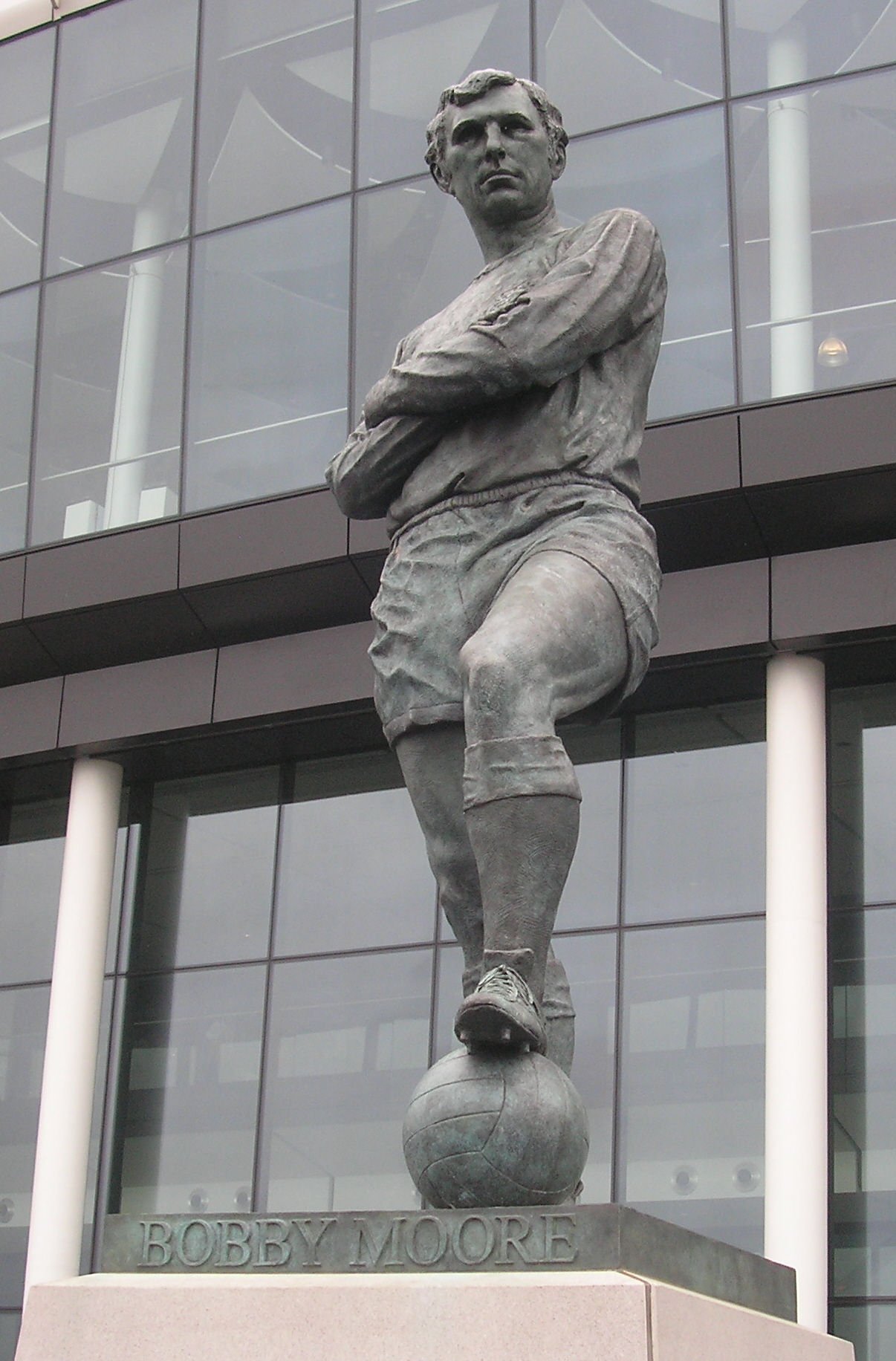
- The sculpture in 2008
- Interactive map of Statue of Bobby Moore
- Location: Wembley Stadium, London
- Coordinates: 51°33′26.28″N 0°16′46.56″W
- Designer: Philip Jackson
- Type: statue
- Material: bronze sculpture
- Height: 20 feet (6.1 m)
- Beginning date: 2005
- Completion date: 2007
- Opening date: 11 May 2007

The Bobby Moore statue is a bronze sculpture of the former West Ham and England footballer Bobby Moore, situated directly outside England's national stadium, Wembley Stadium, in Wembley Park, north-west London. It commemorates the life of Moore, who captained the only England side ever to win the World Cup, defeating Germany 4–2 in the 1966 FIFA World Cup Final held in England at the old Wembley Stadium, demolished in 2003. Commissioned by the Football Association, it was unveiled outside the new stadium when it opened in 2007, fourteen years after Moore's death from cancer, aged 51. Standing 20 feet (6.1 m) tall on a stone plinth, it looks out over spectators as they walk down Wembley Way into the stadium. Sculpted by the Royal Sculptor Philip Jackson, it is Jackson's second piece featuring Moore, after the World Cup Sculpture unveiled in 2003.

== Statue ==
The work, titled The Bobby Moore Sculpture by Jackson, is a twice life size, tall bronze piece and stands at 20 feet (6.1 m) including the plinth. It is located at the end of Wembley Way and weighs around two tons. It was placed in a highly prominent position, on a plinth on the north side of the stadium, with Moore looking north along Wembley Way, which forms the main pedestrian approach to the stadium, where it can look over arriving fans.

In addition to the statue, the work features on the front of its stone plinth a plaque which depicts the rest of the 1966 England team, while similarly on the side is mounted a sculpture of an England cap, with "World Championship, Jules Rimet Cup, 1970" written on the peak.

The work also features an inscription composed by Jeff Powell, a football journalist and one of Moore's closest friends. It reads:

Immaculate footballer. Imperial defender. Immortal hero of 1966. First Englishman to raise the World Cup aloft. Favourite son of London's East End. Finest legend of West Ham United. National Treasure. Master of Wembley. Lord of the game. Captain extraordinary. Gentleman of all time.

== Inspiration ==
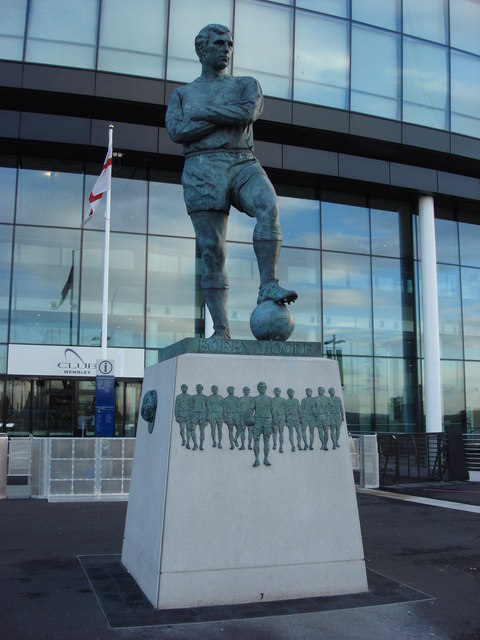
The full statue and plinth, outside the Wembley north entrance

The subject of the statue is the English footballer Bobby Moore OBE (1941–1993). Moore, who died of cancer aged 51, was the captain of West Ham United and England team, and had led England to victory at the 1966 World Cup at old Wembley. The statue is a tribute to Moore's unique achievement of being a World Cup winning England captain, and was commissioned in response to a Football Association fan poll to find the greatest England player of the last 50 years, won "hands down" by Moore.

Jackson sought to create a sculpture that "captures the qualities associated with Bobby Moore, namely integrity, loyalty, leadership, popularity and humility but above all as the greatest-ever English footballer." Jackson consulted with a specially formed panel to agree the design, formed from Moore's widow Stephanie, Moore's fellow footballers and friends Bobby Charlton, Geoff Hurst and Trevor Brooking, the FA and WNSL chiefs Brian Barwick and Michael Cunnah, the Royal British Society of Sculptors President Brian Falconbridge, and architect Lord Foster, as well as fan representative Gavin Morton-Holmes. On unveiling, Jackson said "What emerged [from the design consultation] was he was this extraordinary presence in the team, which gave this enormous confidence and allowed the team to sort of win through in '66 and so I created the sculpture in this sort of old fashioned heroic style."

== History ==
=== Commissioning ===
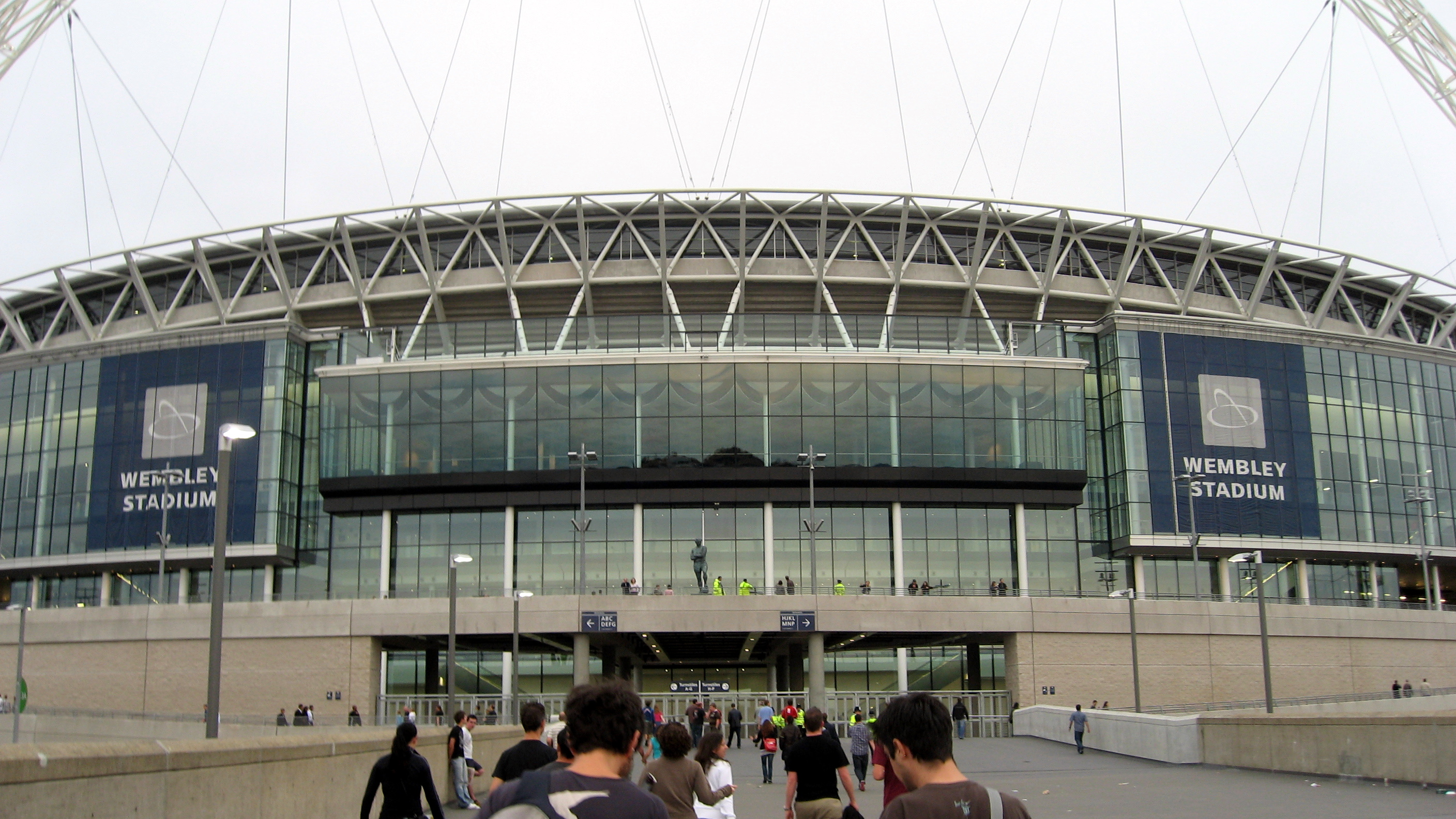
The statue at the end of Wembley Way

Wembley National Stadium Ltd (WNSL) announced it was commissioning the statue in September 2005, while the new Wembley was being built, replacing the Old Wembley. According to Paul Kelso of The Guardian, the statue was the Football Association's first official tribute to Moore.

Jackson was selected from a short-list to produce the statue. It was the second time Jackson had produced a sculpture of Moore, having completed The Champions sculpture situated near West Ham's stadium, the Boleyn Ground, unveiled in 2003 by Prince Andrew, Duke of York, and features Moore held aloft on the shoulders of other players, himself holding the World Cup trophy aloft.

=== Production ===
Preview images of the clay mould for the sculpture were released in January 2006, while Stephanie Moore visited the studio to see the work in progress. Modelled in clay, the sculpture was then moulded in hard plaster and then sand, to facilitate casting in bronze, with the cast statue finished by patination for the final colour.

Jackson created eight casts of Moore's right foot for the sculpture, one of which was auctioned on 31 May 2006 at Christie's in aid of Moore's cancer charity.

=== Unveiling ===
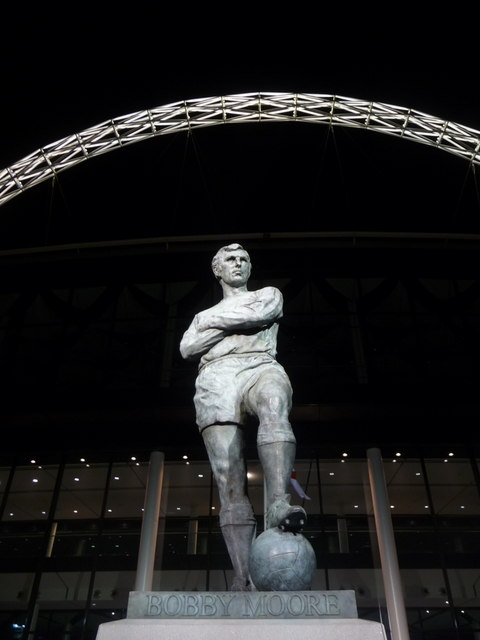
By night, beneath the Wembley Arch

The statue was unveiled on 11 May 2007 by Bobby Charlton, with guests including Moore's widow Stephanie, Prime Minister Tony Blair and Geoff Hurst. The statue was the "finishing touch" to the completion of the new Wembley, which officially opened after several delays, on 19 May, with the staging of the 2007 FA Cup Final. WNSL originally intended to unveil it in 2006, on the 40th anniversary of the World Cup win, with the new stadium having originally been due to open in time for the May 2006 FA Cup Final.

== Reception ==
The statue, along with the signature steel arch, are described by Paul Hayward of The Guardian as the "inspiring architectural flourishes" of the stadium. Henry Winter of The Daily Telegraph, writing in 2009, described how the statue "captures Moore's dignity", and is the place where everyone on their way into Wembley pauses for a moment to admire "this magnificent likeness of the most important figure in the history of English sport and [give] thanks for 1966".

Moore's widow said of the completed statue, "Philip has done an incredible job of capturing Bobby – both in terms of his qualities as a player and his physical appearance."

== Gallery ==
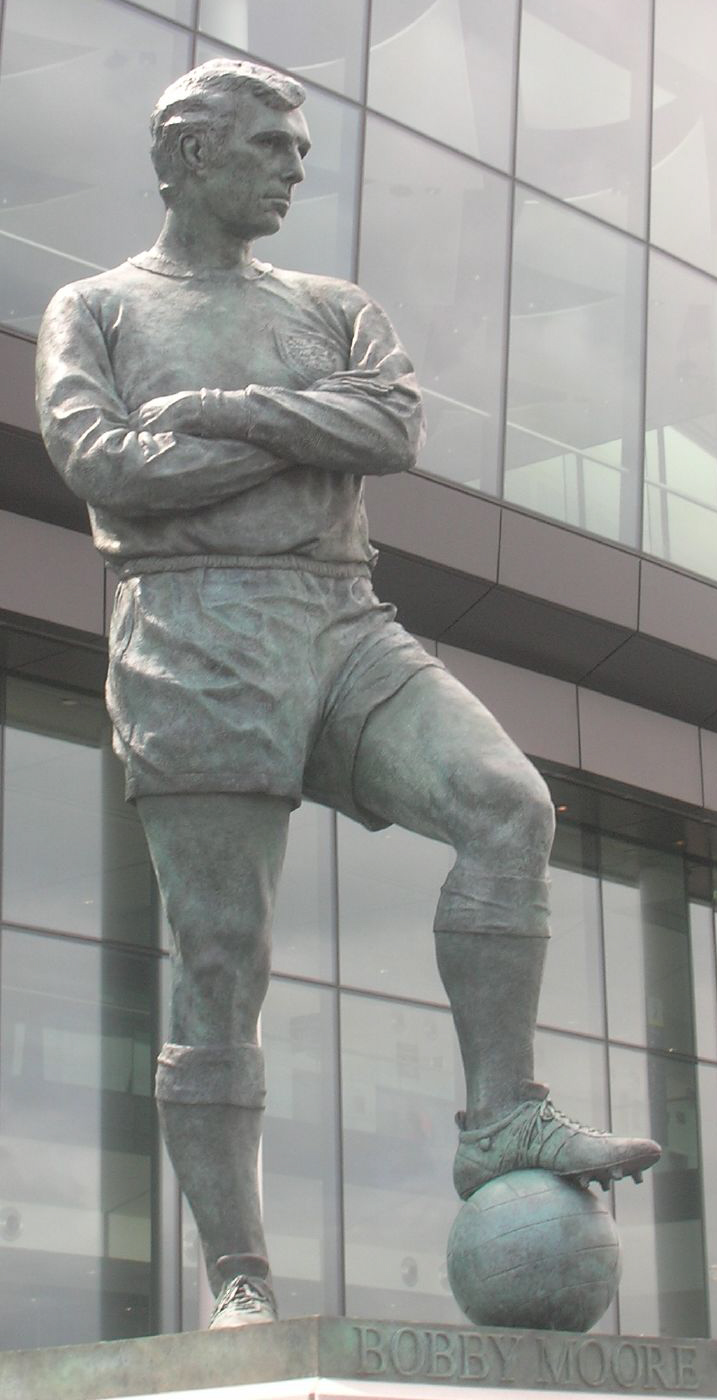
side on

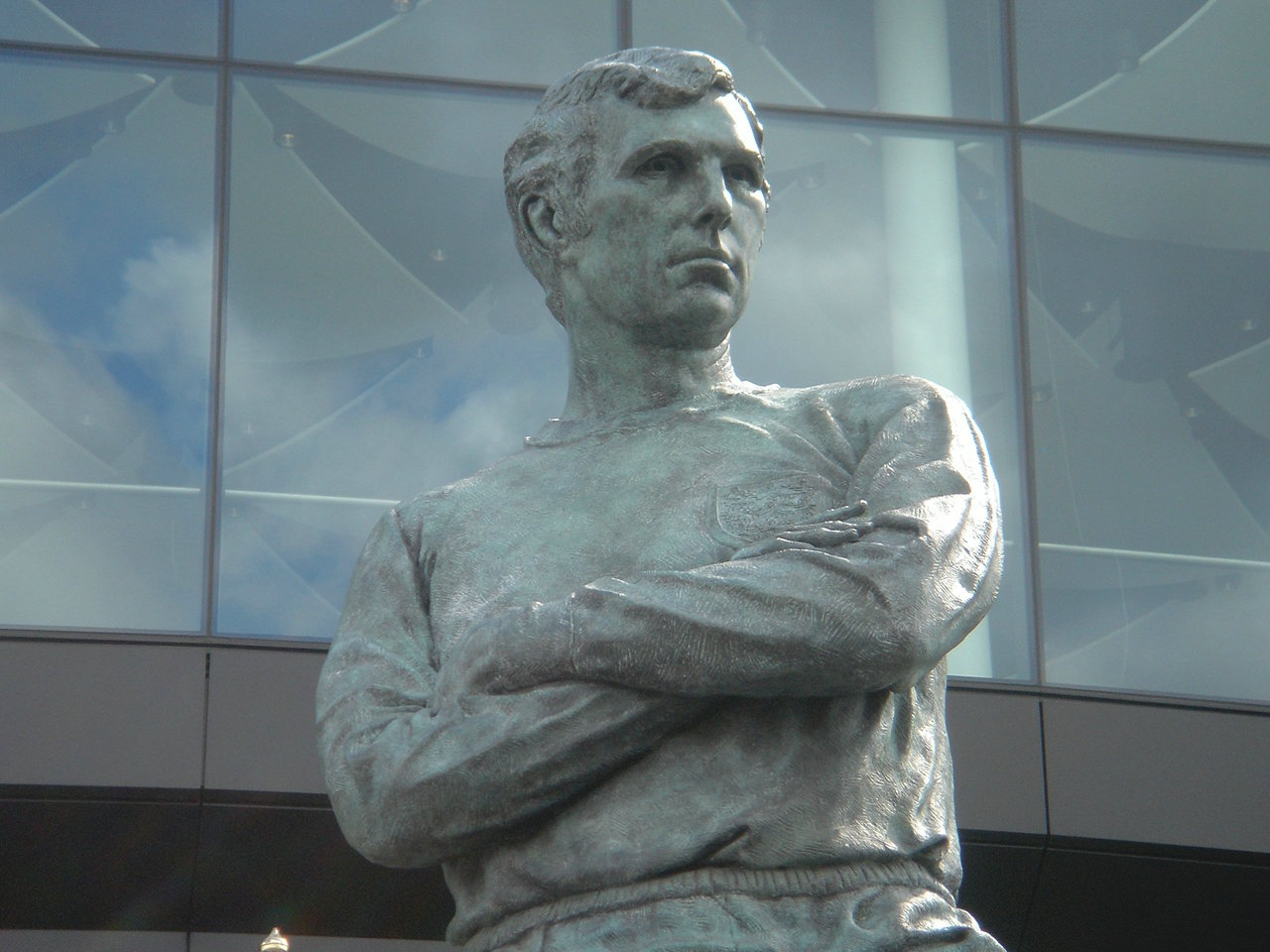
close up

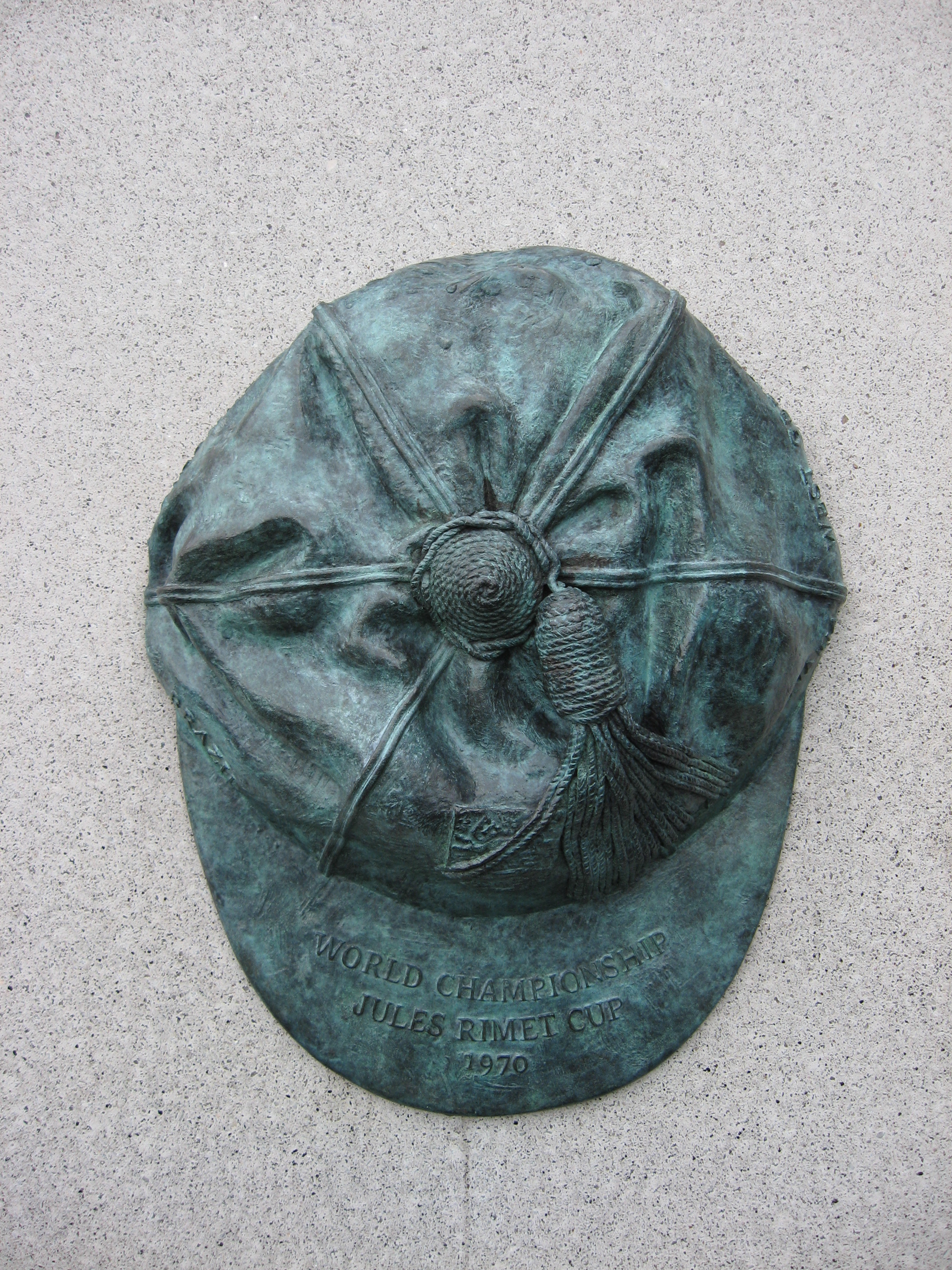
cap

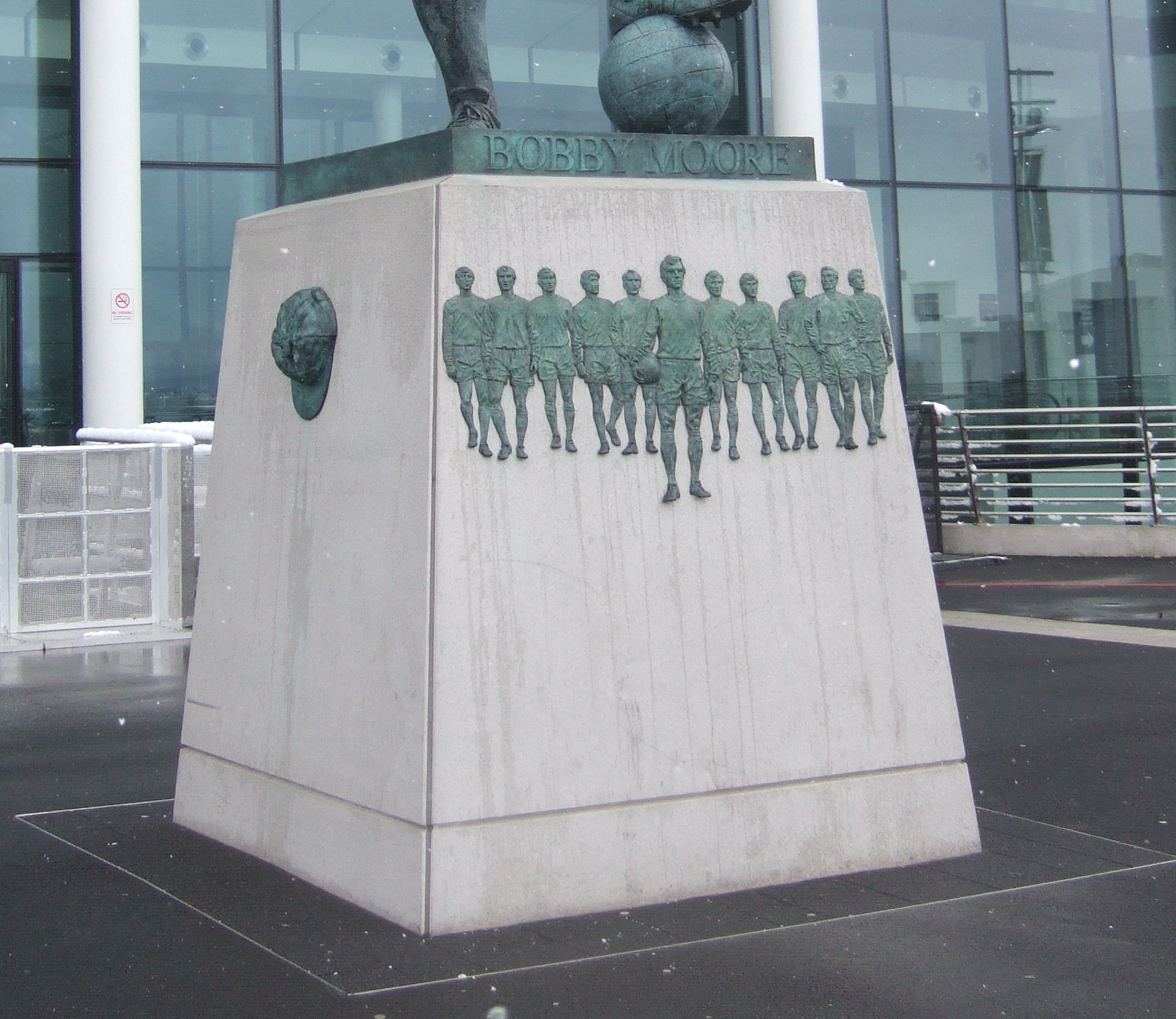
plinth

== See also ==
- List of public art in Brent
