= Michael Aaron Dennis =

American writer

Michael Aaron Dennis is an American author. He received a doctorate in the history of science from Johns Hopkins University (1991) and conducted postdoctoral fellowships at the Smithsonian's National Air and Space Museum and the UCSD. Dennis has contributed over two dozen articles to the online edition of the Encyclopædia Britannica, including the entry on English Wikipedia.

== Works ==
- A Change of State: The Political Cultures of Technical Practice at the MIT Instrumentation Laboratory and the Johns Hopkins University Applied Physics Laboratory, 1930-1945.
- Architects of Information Advantage: The Mitre Corporation Since 1958 (co-author: Davis Dyer). Dec 1998. ISBN 978-1-58192-012-3
- Count Me Out!. Social Studies of Science, Vol. 31, No. 3 (Jun., 2001), pp. 436–439
- "Our First Line of Defense": Two University Laboratories in the Postwar American State. Isis, Vol. 85, No. 3 (Sep., 1994), pp. 427–455
- “Accounting for Research: New Histories of Corporate Laboratories and the Social History of American Science.” 1987. Social Studies of Science 17(3):479–518.
