= Bobby Moore =

English footballer (1941–1993)

Bobby Moore OBE
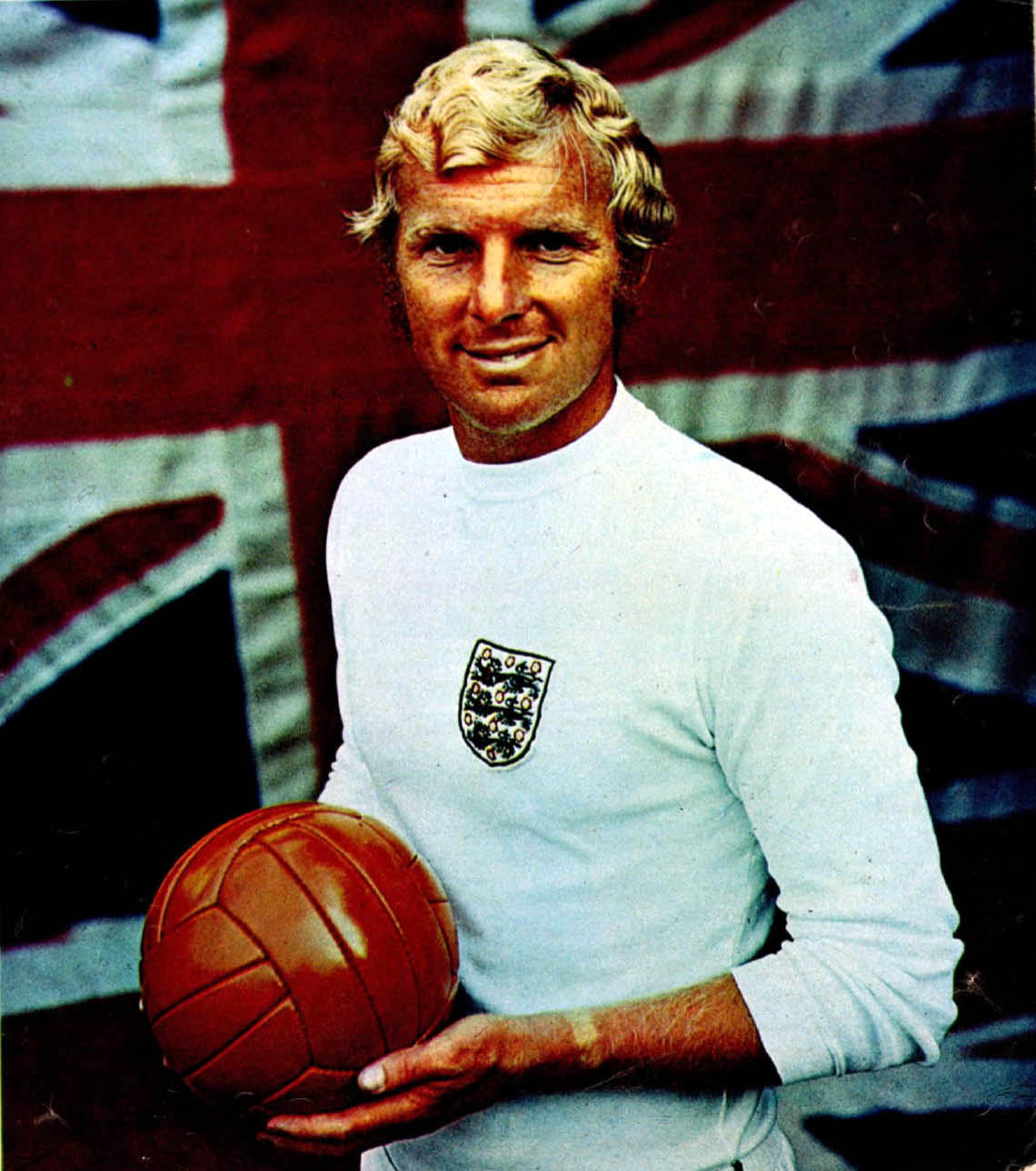
- Moore in 1970

Personal information
- Full name: Robert Frederick Chelsea Moore
- Date of birth: 12 April 1941
- Place of birth: Barking, Essex, England
- Date of death: 24 February 1993 (aged 51)
- Place of death: Putney, London, England
- Height: 5 ft 10 in (1.78 m)
- Position: Defender

Youth career
- Barking
- 1956–1958: West Ham United

Senior career*
Years	Team	Apps	(Gls)
1958–1974	West Ham United	544	(24)
1974–1977	Fulham	124	(1)
1976	→ San Antonio Thunder (loan)	24	(1)
1978	Seattle Sounders	7	(0)
1978	Herning Fremad	9	(0)
1981	Eastern	0	(0)
1983	Carolina Lightnin'	8	(0)
Total		716	(26)

International career
1960–1962	England U23	9	(2)
1962–1973	England	108	(2)

Managerial career
- 1980–1981: Oxford City
- 1982–1983: Eastern
- 1984–1986: Southend United
Medal record
Men's football
Representing England
FIFA World Cup
Winner	1966
UEFA European Championship
Third place	1968
- * Club domestic league appearances and goals

Robert Frederick Chelsea Moore (12 April 1941 – 24 February 1993) was an English professional footballer. He captained West Ham United for more than ten years, and was the captain of the England national team that won the 1966 FIFA World Cup. He is widely regarded as one of the greatest defenders in the history of football, and was cited by Pelé as the greatest defender he had ever played against. Moore is considered one of the greatest players of all time.

Widely regarded as West Ham's greatest ever player, Moore played more than 600 games for the club during a 16-year tenure, winning the FA Cup in 1963–64 and the European Cup Winners' Cup in 1964–65. During his time at the club, he won the FWA Footballer of the Year in 1964 and the West Ham Player of the Year in 1961, 1963, 1968 and 1970. In August 2008, West Ham United officially retired his number 6 shirt, 15 years after his death.

Moore was made captain of England in 1963, at the age of 22; he went on to lift the World Cup trophy in 1966. He played a total of 108 caps for his country, which at the time of his international retirement in 1973 was a national record. This record was later broken by Peter Shilton. Moore's total of 108 caps continued as a record for an outfield player until 28 March 2009, when David Beckham gained his 109th cap. Moore is a member of the World Team of the 20th Century, and is regarded as a national team icon. A bronze statue of him stands at the entrance to Wembley Stadium.

A composed central defender, Moore was best known for his reading of the game and ability to anticipate opposition movements, thereby distancing himself from the image of the hard-tackling, high-jumping defender. Receiving the BBC Sports Personality of the Year in 1966, he was the first footballer to win the award and he remained the only one for a further 24 years. Moore was given an OBE in the 1967 New Year Honours List. He was made an inaugural inductee of the English Football Hall of Fame in 2002 in recognition of his impact on the English game as a player, and in the same year he was named in the BBC's list of the 100 Greatest Britons.

Overall, he made over 1,100 appearances in his career.

== Football career ==
=== Early days ===
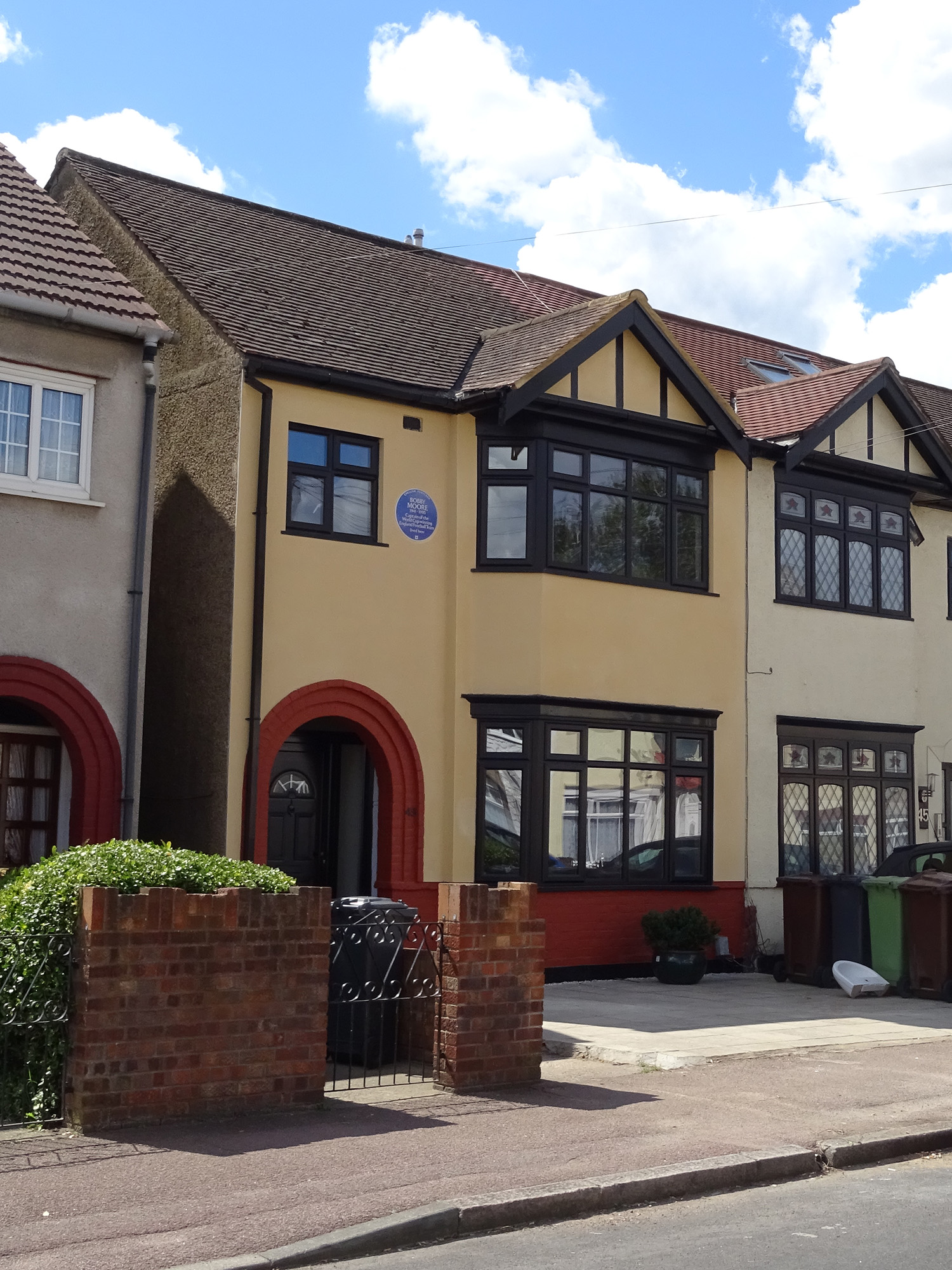
Moore's childhood home, 43 Waverley Gardens, Barking, London

Robert Frederick Chelsea Moore was born on 12 April 1941 in Upney Hospital in Barking, Essex. He was the son of Robert E. Moore and Doris (née Buckle). He attended Westbury Primary School in Barking and then Tom Hood School, Leytonstone, playing football for both.

In 1956, Moore joined West Ham United as a player and, after advancing through the club's youth set-up, he played his first game on 8 September 1958 against Manchester United. In putting on the number six shirt, he replaced his mentor Malcolm Allison, who was suffering from tuberculosis.

At international level, Moore played for the England national youth team. The team reached the UEFA Youth Tournament final in 1958, and won the British Amateur Youth Championship that year.

Both he and Geoff Hurst played in the 1959 FA Youth Cup final team that lost to Blackburn Rovers (1–2 on aggregate); both also were in the team that won the Southern Junior Floodlit Cup (1–0 v Chelsea) later that year. Moore also played cricket for the Essex youth team alongside Hurst.

Malcolm Allison never played another first team game for West Ham as Moore became a regular. A composed central defender, Moore was admired for his reading of the game and ability to anticipate opposition movements, thereby distancing himself from the image of the hard-tackling, high-jumping defender. Moore's ability to head the ball or keep up with the pace was average at best, but the way he read the game, marshalled his team and timed his tackles marked him out as world class. Moore was sent off once over the course of his West Ham career, for a foul on Dave Wagstaffe in the final moment of a match against Manchester City in November 1961. The referee had simultaneously blown his whistle for the offence and for full-time. As red cards were not issued at that time, the dismissal did not become apparent until after the match.

=== An England star, a European winner ===
In 1960, Moore earned a call up to the England Under-23 squad. His form and impact on West Ham as a whole earned him a late call-up to the full England squad by Walter Winterbottom and The Football Association selection committee in 1962, when final preparations were being made for the summer's World Cup finals in Chile. Moore was uncapped as he flew to South America with the rest of the squad, but made his debut on 20 May 1962 in England's final pre-tournament friendly – a 4–0 win over Peru in Lima. Also making his debut that day was Tottenham Hotspur defender Maurice Norman. Both proved so impressive that they stayed in the team for the whole of England's participation in the World Cup, which ended in defeat by eventual winners Brazil in the quarter finals at Viña del Mar.

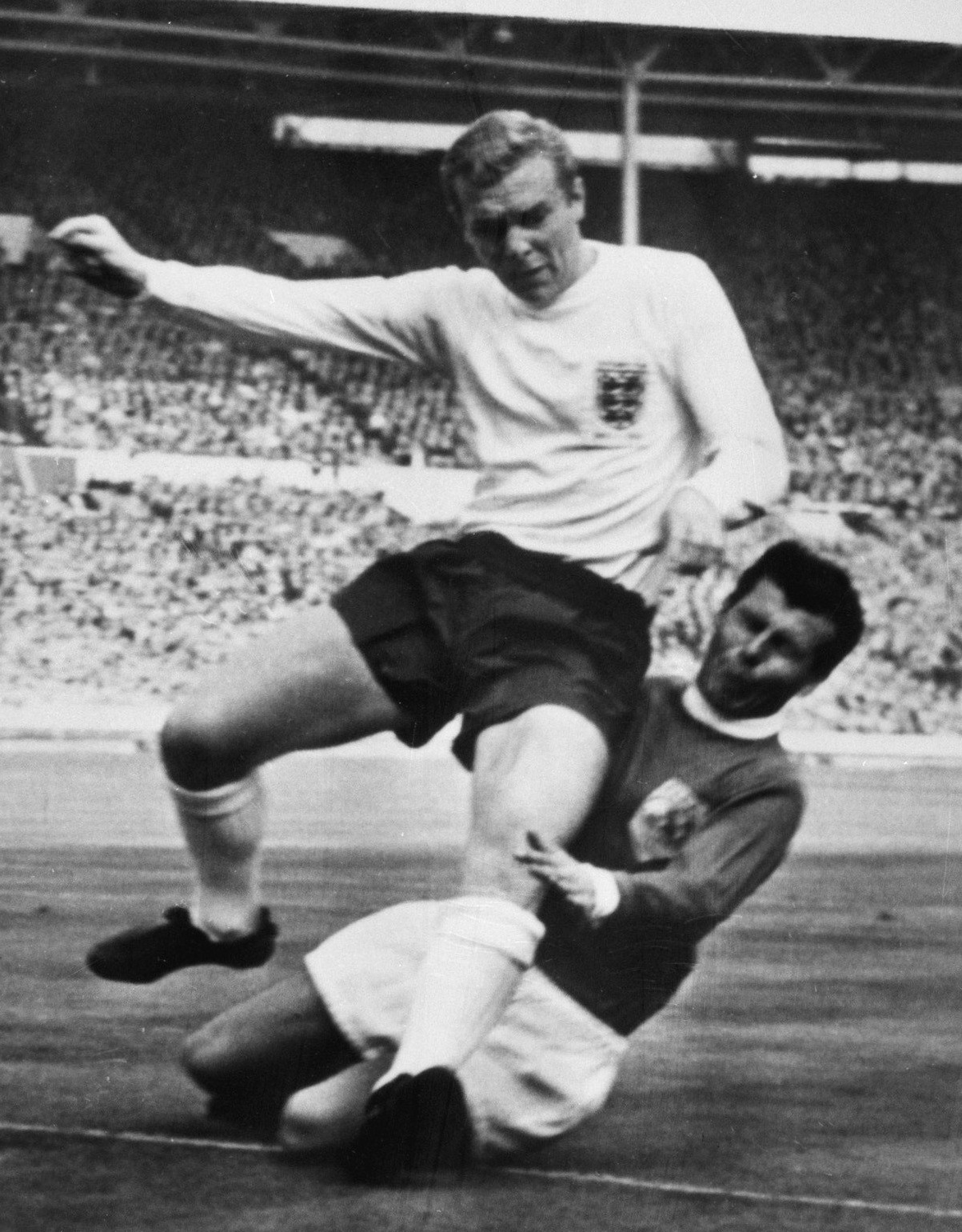
Moore (left) and Czech midfielder Josef Masopust at the 1963 England v Rest of the World match at Wembley

On 29 May 1963, 22-year-old Moore captained his country for the first time in just his 12th appearance after the retirement of Johnny Haynes and an injury to his successor, Jimmy Armfield. He was the youngest man ever to captain England at the highest level. England defeated Czechoslovakia 4–2 in the game and Armfield returned to the role of captain afterwards, but new coach Alf Ramsey gave Moore the job permanently during a series of summer friendlies in 1964, organised because England had failed to reach the latter stages of the European Championships.

1964 turned out to be quite an eventful year for Moore. As well as gaining the England captaincy, he lifted the FA Cup as West Ham defeated Preston North End 3–2 in the final at Wembley, courtesy of a last-minute goal from Ronnie Boyce. On a personal level, Moore was also successfully treated for testicular cancer and was named the Football Writers' Association Footballer of the Year.

The FA Cup success would become the first of three successful Wembley finals in as many years for Moore. In 1965, he lifted the European Cup Winners Cup after West Ham defeated 1860 Munich 2–0 in the final with both goals coming from Alan Sealey. By now he was the first choice captain for England with 30 caps, and around whom Ramsey was building a team to prove correct his prediction that they would win the 1966 World Cup.

1966 had a mixed start for Moore. In January, he scored his first England goal in a 1–1 draw with Poland at Goodison Park, but two months later captained West Ham to the final of the League Cup – in its last season before its transfer to Wembley as a one-off final – which they lost 5–3 on aggregate to West Bromwich Albion. For Moore, who had scored in the first leg, and his West Ham teammates Geoff Hurst and Martin Peters, considerable consolation lay ahead. Moore scored his second and ultimately final England goal in a friendly against Norway, two weeks before the World Cup would begin.

=== 1966 World Cup ===
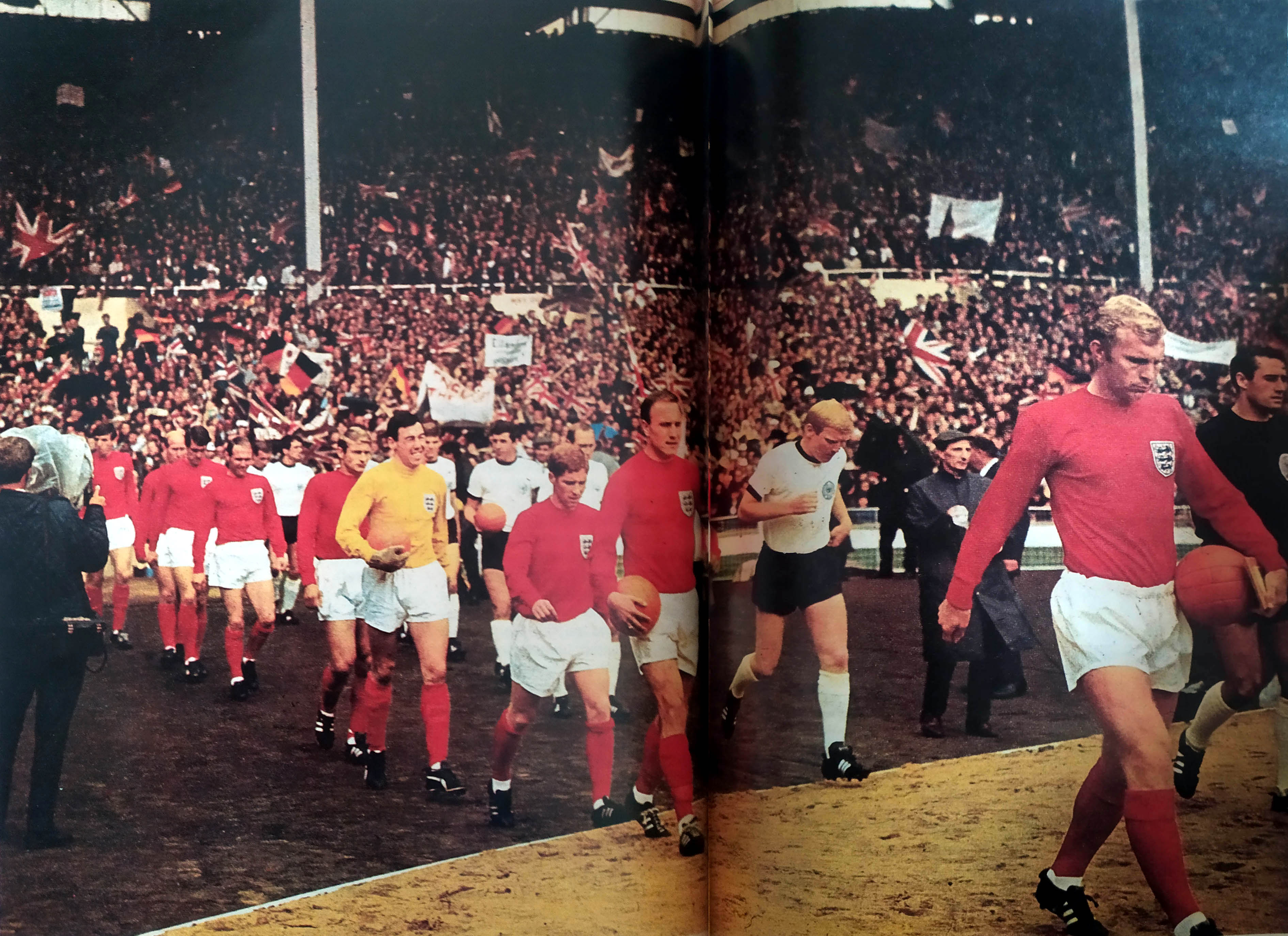
Bobby Moore (far right) leading the England team out on to the pitch to play the 1966 FIFA World Cup Final against West Germany at Wembley Stadium

On the verge of his greatest triumph, details were released to the press in early 1966 that Moore wanted to leave West Ham. Moore had let his contract slip to termination, and only after the intervention of Alf Ramsey and realisation he was technically ineligible to play, did he re-sign with West Ham to allow him to captain the England team of 1966. Ramsey had summoned West Ham manager Ron Greenwood to England's hotel and told the two of them to resolve their differences and get a contract signed up. Moore was the leader of the World Cup winning side and established himself as a world-class player and sporting icon. With all their games at Wembley, England had got through their group with little trouble, they then beat Argentina in their quarter final and a Eusébio-led Portugal team in the semi-finals. West Germany awaited in the final.

According to Geoff Hurst's autobiography, England full back George Cohen overheard Ramsey talking to his coaching staff about the possibility of dropping Moore for the final and deploying the more battle-hardened Norman Hunter in his place. However, eventually they settled on keeping the captain in the team. Moore had not been playing badly, nor had he given the impression that he had been distracted by his contract dispute prior to the competition. The only possible explanations were that the Germans had some rather fast attacking players, which could expose Moore's own lack of pace, and that Hunter – who was of a similar age to Moore but only had four caps – was the club partner of Moore's co-defender with England, Jack Charlton.

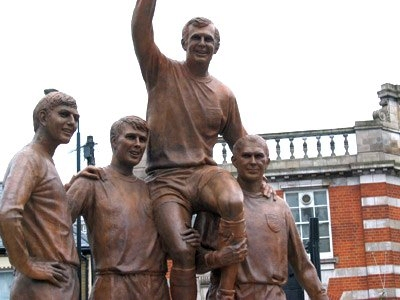
The World Cup Sculpture featuring Moore with the World Cup trophy, on the shoulders of Geoff Hurst and Ray Wilson, together with Martin Peters. (Location: Barking Road at the junction with Green Street, London E6).

In the final, England went 1–0 down through Helmut Haller, but Moore's awareness and quick-thinking helped England to a swift equaliser. He was fouled by Wolfgang Overath midway inside the German half and, rather than remonstrate or head back into defence, he picked himself up quickly while looking ahead and delivered an instant free kick on to Hurst's head, in a movement practised at West Ham. Hurst scored.

The West Ham connection to England's biggest day became stronger when Peters scored to take England 2–1 up, but the Germans equalised in the final minute of normal time through Wolfgang Weber – as Moore appealed unsuccessfully for a handball decision – to take the match into extra time.

Ramsey was convinced the Germans were exhausted, and after Hurst scored a controversial and heavily debated goal, the game looked over. With seconds remaining, and England under the pressure of another German attack, the ball broke to Moore on the edge of his own penalty area. Teammates shouted at Moore to just get rid of the ball, but he calmly picked out the feet of Hurst 40 yards (36 m) upfield, who scored to bring the score to 4–2.

Of many memorable images from that day, one is of Moore wiping his hands clean of mud and sweat on the velvet tablecloth before shaking the hand of Queen Elizabeth II as she presented him with the Jules Rimet trophy (the World Cup). The Guardian wrote "Moore is the calmest person in the stadium as he leads the England players up to the Royal Box".

== As an icon ==
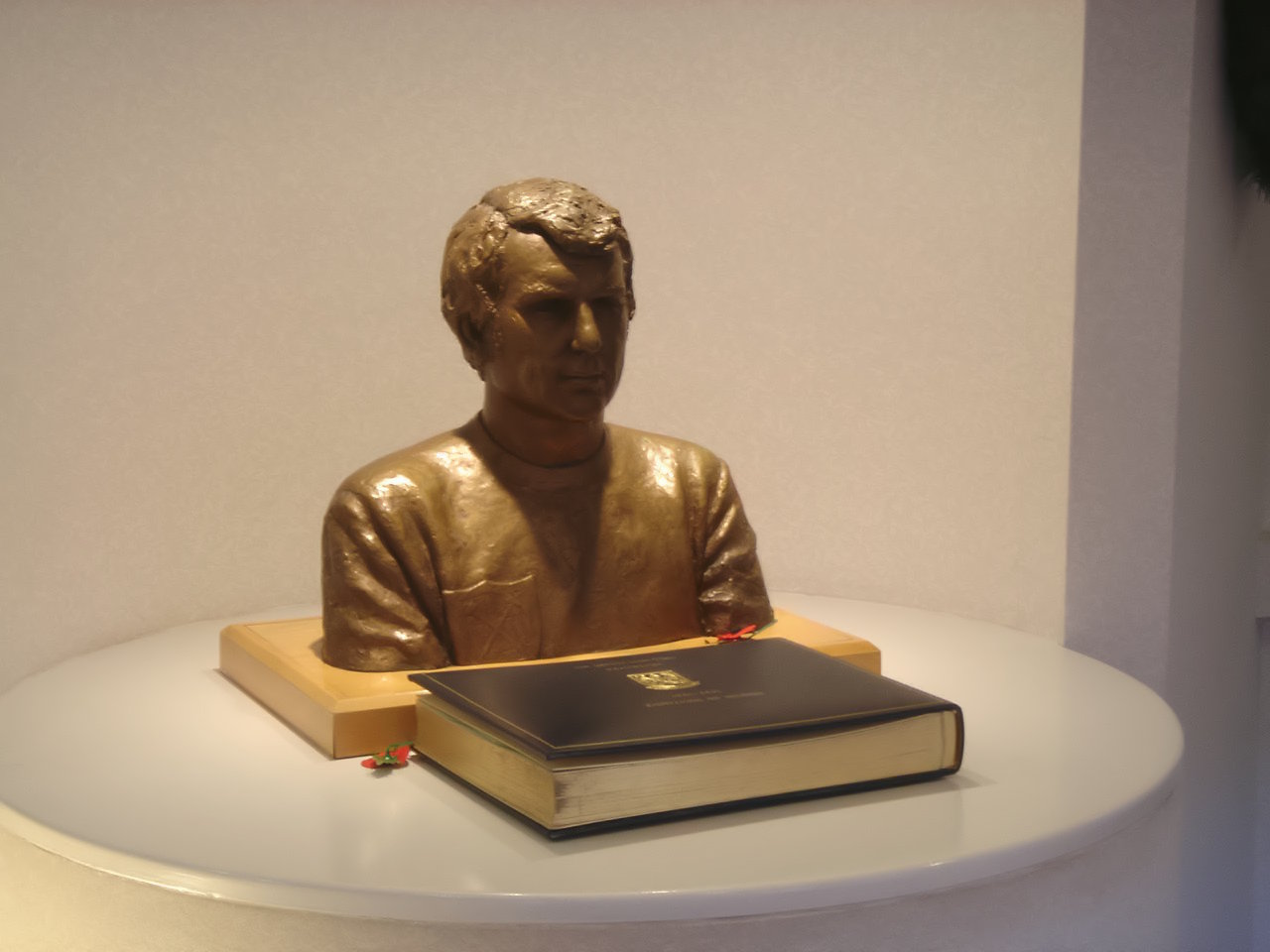
Bust of Moore in the entrance foyer of the stand bearing his name at West Ham's Boleyn Ground

Moore became a national icon as a consequence of England's success, with he and the other two West Ham players taking the World Cup around the grounds which West Ham visited during the following domestic season. He was awarded the coveted BBC Sports Personality of the Year title at the end of 1966, the first footballer to do so, and remaining the only one for a further 24 years until it was awarded to Paul Gascoigne in 1990.

Moore was awarded an Order of the British Empire by Queen Elizabeth II in her 1966 New Year Honours List. He is cited as :Robert Fredrick MOORE, Esq. Captain, England Association Football World Cup Team.

Moore's image and popularity allowed him to start a number of business ventures, including a sports shop next to West Ham's ground, Upton Park, and he also appeared with his wife Tina, along with Peters and his wife Kathy, in a television advertisement for the pub industry, urging people to "look in at the local".

He continued to play for West Ham and England, earning his 50th cap in a 5–1 win over Wales at the end of 1966 in a Home International match which also doubled up as a qualifier for the 1968 European Championships. England ultimately reached the semi-finals (the tournament was just a four-team event) where they played Yugoslavia in Florence and lost 1–0. England, as champions, did not have to qualify for the next World Cup, and Moore remained the first name on Ramsey's team sheet, winning his 78th cap prior to the squad's flight to South America for a short period of altitude-acclimatisation, before going on to the finals in Mexico.

=== 1970 ===
The year 1970 was a bittersweet, mixed and eventful one for Moore. Retained as captain for the 1970 World Cup, there was however heavy disruption to preparations when an attempt was made to implicate Moore in the theft of a bracelet from a jeweller in Bogotá, Colombia, where England were involved in a warm-up game. A young assistant had claimed that Moore had removed the bracelet from the hotel shop without paying for it. While Moore had been in the shop (having entered with Bobby Charlton to look for a gift for Charlton's wife, Norma), no proof was offered to support the accusations. Moore was arrested and then released. He then travelled with the England team to play another match against Ecuador in Quito. He played, winning his 80th cap, and England were 2–0 victors, but when the team plane stopped back in Colombia on the return to Mexico, Moore was detained and placed under four days of house arrest. Diplomatic pressure, plus the obvious weakness of the evidence, eventually saw the case dropped entirely, and an exonerated Moore returned to Mexico to rejoin the squad and prepare for the World Cup. He received a guard of honour from his squad when he arrived at the team hotel.

By common consent, Bobby Moore's greatest game was the fabled 1970 World Cup group match against Brazil in Guadalajara. To crown it all of course is "that tackle by Moore" celebrated in song ["Three Lions"] and replayed a million times since. One hundred years from now when anyone asks what made Moore special, it will be the first piece of evidence.

— The Times, "Most famous tackle looked like Superman stopping a train".

Moore went on to play a leading role in England's progress through their group. On 2 June he captained England to a 1–0 victory against Romania. In the second game against favourites Brazil, there was a defining moment for Moore when he tackled Jairzinho with such precision and cleanness that it has been described as the perfect tackle, and as the "tackle of the century." It continues to be shown on television around the world. Brazil still won the game 1–0, but England progressed through the group. Moore swapped shirts with Pelé after the game. The shirt was displayed at the National Football Museum in Manchester, courtesy of the Priory Collection. A 1–0 win over Czechoslovakia allowed England to finish second in the group and advance to the knockout stage.

At the Quarter Final stage, a rematch of the 1966 World Cup against West Germany, England took a 2–0 lead but lost 3–2 in extra time. At the end of the year, Moore was voted runner-up (behind Gerd Müller of West Germany) for the 1970 European Footballer of the Year award.

=== Final years at the top ===
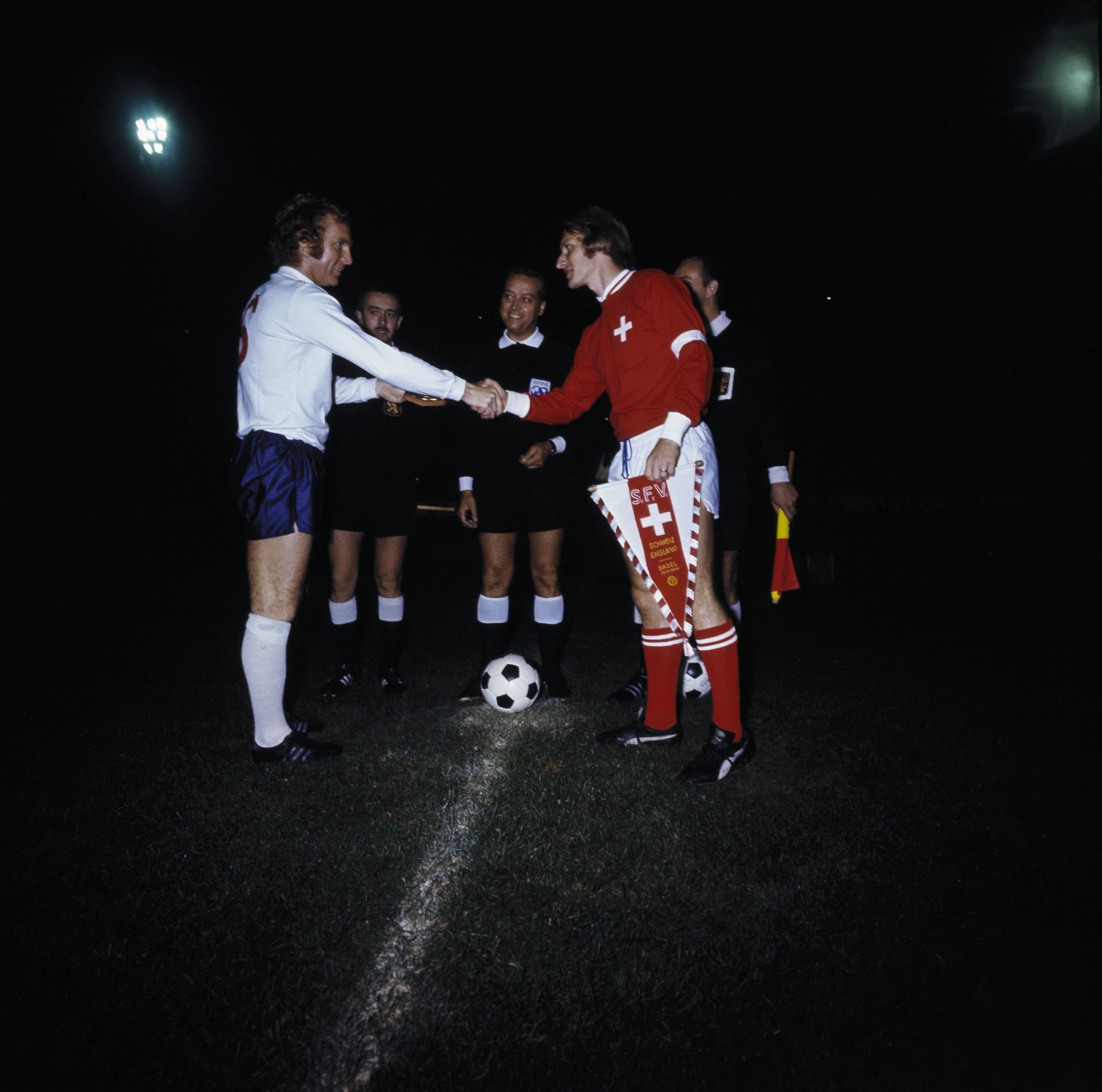
Moore as England's captain before a match against Switzerland

On 10 August 1970, Moore received an anonymous threat to kidnap his wife and hold her to a £10,000 ransom. This caused him to pull out of pre-season friendlies against Bristol City and AFC Bournemouth. However, his services to West Ham were rewarded with a testimonial match against Celtic at the end of 1970.

Although Moore was seen as an icon and a perfect influence on the game, he was not without his faults or controversies. On 7 January 1971, he and three West Ham teammates, Jimmy Greaves, Brian Dear and Clyde Best, were all fined a week's wages by West Ham manager Greenwood after going out drinking in a nightclub until the early hours of the morning prior to an FA Cup third round tie against Blackpool. West Ham lost the tie 4–0. The nightclub in Blackpool was owned by boxer Brian London, a friend of Moore. Blackpool were the bottom side in Division One at the time, and were relegated at the end of the season. Coincidentally, on the previous night, Moore was featured on TV as the subject on This Is Your Life. Brian Glanville stated that it was not uncommon for Moore to drink heavily, but he was often seen training with West Ham the next day, working off the alcohol he had consumed the previous night. On 12 June 1972, he also played for the Greek side Olympiacos, as their captain, in a friendly match against the Brazilian club Corinthians.

Moore surpassed West Ham's appearances record in 1973 when he played for the club for the 509th time. Three days earlier, on 14 February 1973, he won his 100th cap for England in a comprehensive 5–0 win over Scotland at Hampden Park By this stage, only Peters and Alan Ball from the 1966 squad were also still involved with the England team. Later the same year, Moore was exposed defensively by Poland in a qualifier for the 1974 FIFA World Cup in Chorzów, deflecting a free kick past goalkeeper Peter Shilton to put the home side ahead, and then losing possession to Włodzimierz Lubański, who scored the second.

Moore's form had dipped enough for Ramsey to choose not to select him for the return game at Wembley which England had to win to qualify. Any other result would send Poland through. Being replaced by Norman Hunter in defence and Peters as the skipper for that match, Moore is understood to have asked Ramsey if this meant he was no longer required, to which Ramsey replied: "Of course not. I need you as my captain at the World Cup next year." It never happened, as England could only draw 1–1. During the Wembley match, Hunter attempted to make a tackle but instead trod on the ball and lost it, a similar error to Moore's lost possession in Chorzów, which allowed Poland to quickly counterattack and score thanks to Shilton's mistake. Allan Clarke equalised with a penalty, but England could not score again as goalkeeper Jan Tomaszewski blocked numerous English chances. Moore later told how he sat alongside Ramsey on the bench and kept urging him to make a substitution, but Ramsey was hesitant to do so. When Kevin Hector finally did come on for Martin Chivers after 85 minutes Moore could be seen on TV yanking down Hector's tracksuit bottoms while Ramsey sat immobile. Moore, later, said to David Miller "you could 'feel' the minutes escaping. I said to Alf, we need someone to go through the middle. He just nodded. We couldn't get Kevin out there quick enough. We almost threw him onto the pitch." Hunter was in an inconsolable state as he was led off the pitch by Harold Shepherdson, and by Moore, whose place in the side he had taken. England's failure to qualify for the 1974 FIFA World Cup signalled the end of Ramsey's reign as national team manager when he was sacked six months later.

Moore won his 108th and final cap in the next game, a 1–0 friendly defeat to Italy on 14 November 1973. He became England's most capped player, beating Bobby Charlton's record by two appearances, and equalled Billy Wright's record of 90 appearances as captain. Peter Shilton, David Beckham and Steven Gerrard have since overtaken the caps record, but the joint captaincy record remains.

=== After West Ham and England ===
He could hardly run, couldn't turn, couldn't head a ball, and had no left foot. But he was the world's greatest defender. He had a better head on his shoulders than any of the others, and even though he was coming towards the end of his career when he joined Fulham, he was still a great player and a tremendous asset. I remember his first ever pass to me. It was very hard and to my right, so I had to turn sharply to reach it. I thought: 'He only passed the ball 15 yards, so why didn't he pass it to my feet?' But as I turned the player marking me was on my left side – so in fact Bobby had beaten him for me. That was the difference.

— John Mitchell on his Fulham teammate Bobby Moore.

Moore played his last game for West Ham in an FA Cup tie against Hereford United in January 1974. He was injured in the match. On 14 March the same year, he left West Ham after more than 15 years, taking with him the club record for appearances (since overtaken by Billy Bonds) and the most international caps for an outfield player.

He joined London rivals Fulham, who were in the Second Division, for £25,000. During Moore's first season there they defeated West Ham in a League Cup tie and then reached the FA Cup Final where they faced West Ham again. This time Fulham lost the game, 2–0, and Moore made his final appearance at Wembley as a professional player.

Moore played his final professional game in England for Fulham on 14 May 1977 against Blackburn Rovers. He played for two teams in the North American Soccer League – San Antonio Thunder in 1976 (24 games, 1 goal) and Seattle Sounders in 1978 (7 games). During 1976, there was also a final appearance on the international field for Team USA in games against Italy, Brazil and an England team captained by Gerry Francis. This was the U.S.A. Bicentennial Cup Tournament, which capitalised on NASL and more importantly England and Italy both failing to qualify for the European Championships that year.

In April 1978, he signed as a professional player with Danish side Herning Fremad to promote Danish football's new transition to professional football, playing 9 games for the club before he retired. In May 1978, he signed with Canadian side Edmonton Black Gold for a summer exhibition schedule, although he only joined the team six weeks later ahead of the 23 June match against Benfica. After Moore's second game with Edmonton against the Seattle Sounders on 28 June, he was signed by the Sounders on 7 July.

The following year, Moore played for Highgate-based club Cracovia for a tour of Malaysia. In 1983, Moore appeared in 8 games for the now-defunct Carolina Lightnin', after injuries left the club without cover.

== Managerial career ==
Following his retirement from playing professionally in 1978, Moore took up a coaching role at Crystal Palace. In 1980, he took up the managerial role at Isthmian League side Oxford City, being assisted by former West Ham teammate Harry Redknapp. During Moore's time at Oxford City he boosted the club's profile, bringing newfound media attention to the club, as well as signing the likes of Phil Beal and John Fraser. In 1981, Moore and Redknapp left Oxford City, being replaced by John Delaney.

Following Moore's time at Oxford City, the former England captain moved to Hong Kong, to manage Eastern, being appointed in August 1982, replacing Peter Wong. Moore had previously spent time at Eastern, playing the final 12 minutes in Eastern's 4–0 Hong Kong Senior Challenge Shield victory against Hong Kong Rangers in December 1981. In January 1983, Moore recruited Terry Cochrane and Alan Ball to play for Eastern. Despite's Moore's new signings for the club, he left the club in March 1983.

Moore became manager of Southend United in 1984. In his first full season, 1984–85, Southend narrowly avoided having to apply for re-election to the Football League amid severe financial difficulties. However, the side was gradually rebuilt and in the 1985–86 season Southend started well and were in the promotion race until the new year before eventually finishing ninth. His successor, David Webb built upon those foundations to win promotion the following year. Moore agreed to serve on the board of the club and held this role until his death.

== Illness and death ==
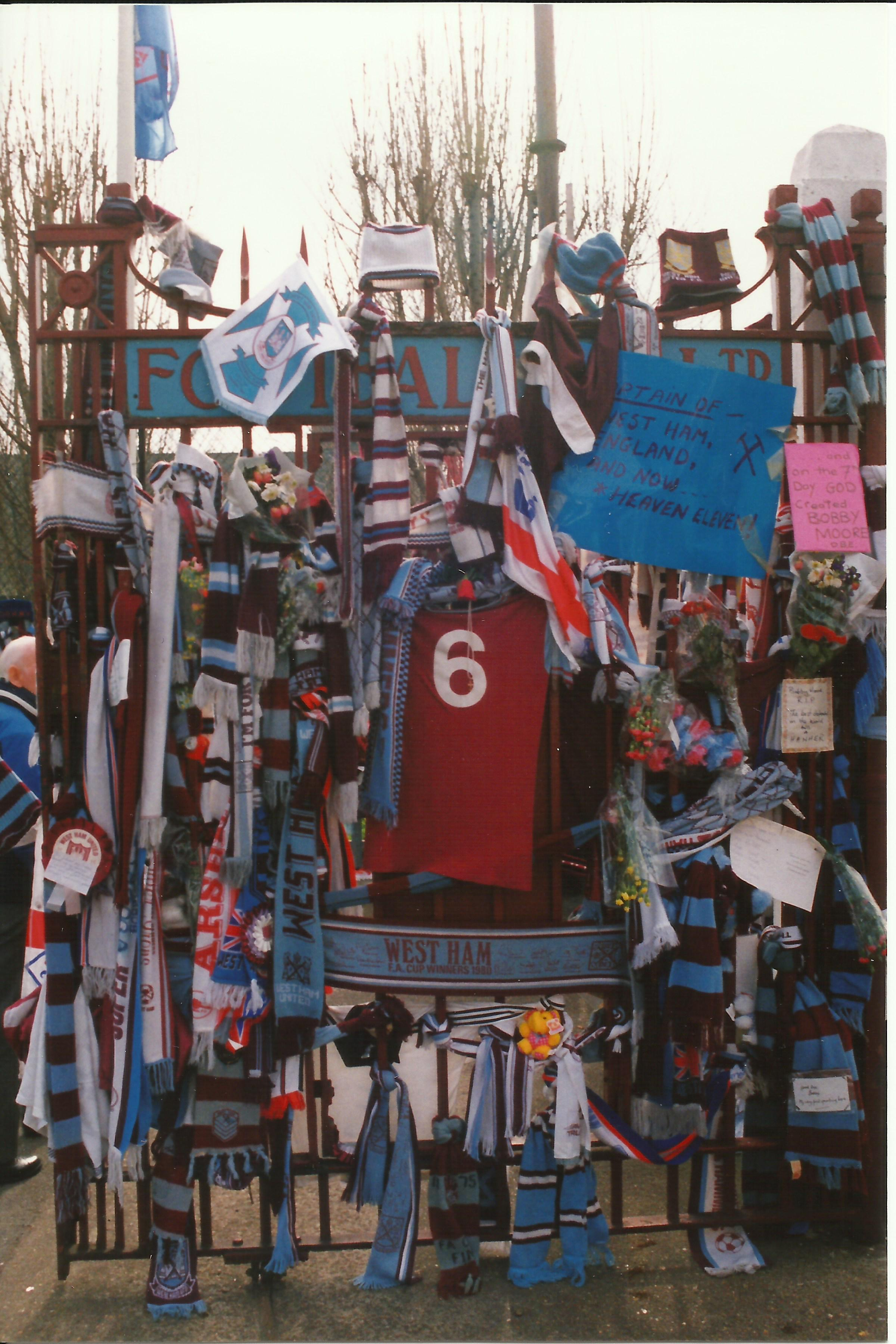
Tributes to Bobby Moore outside Upton Park on 6 March 1993

Moore's first cancer was in 1964, two years before England's first World Cup win — a diagnosis of testicular cancer, treated by orchidectomy of one; it had not spread. In April 1991, Moore underwent an operation for suspected colorectal cancer. At the time it was reported as an "emergency stomach operation".

On 14 February 1993, he announced he was suffering from colorectal cancer and liver cancer; by this time it had spread. Three days later he commentated on an England match against San Marino at Wembley, alongside his friend Jonathan Pearce. Moore attended a dinner after the match and made a presentation. That was to be his final public act; he died seven days later on 24 February, at 6:36 am.

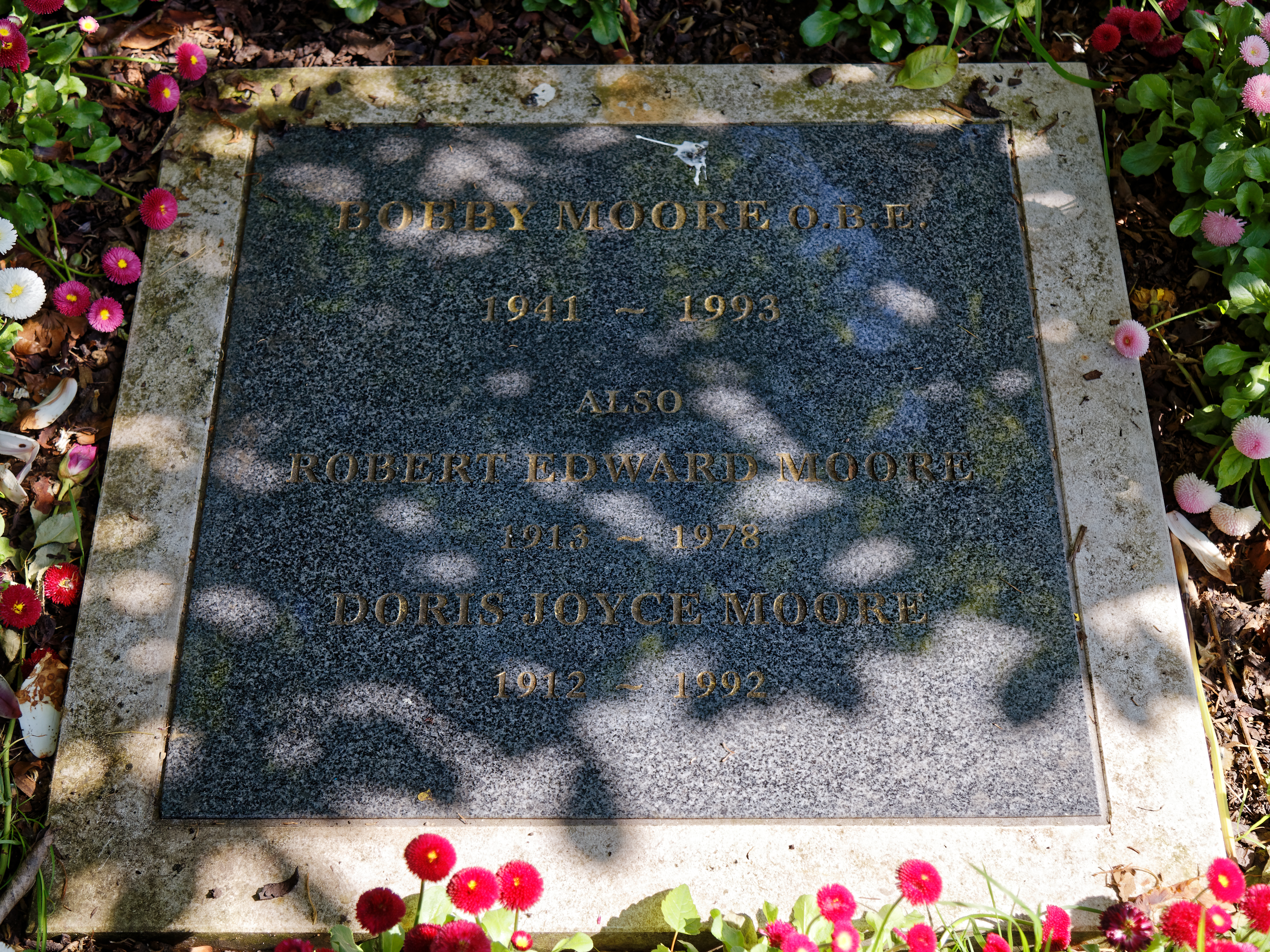
Moore's grave in the Memorial Gardens, City of London Cemetery

Moore was the first member of the England World Cup–winning side to die. His funeral was held on 2 March 1993 at Putney Vale crematorium and his ashes kept in the plot of his father, Robert Edward (died 1978) and his mother, Doris Joyce (died 1992) at City of London Cemetery and Crematorium.

The first West Ham home game after his death was on 6 March 1993, against Wolverhampton Wanderers. Upton Park was awash with floral tributes, scarves and other football memorabilia from West Ham fans and those of other clubs. Fellow 1966 World Cup winners Geoff Hurst and Martin Peters placed a floral replica of a West Ham shirt, showing Moore's number, 6, on the back, on the centre spot before the game. West Ham rested the No. 6 for the game, with the regular No. 6, Ian Bishop, wearing No. 12. The game was won by West Ham 3–1: Trevor Morley, Julian Dicks and Matty Holmes scored for West Ham, Steve Bull in reply.

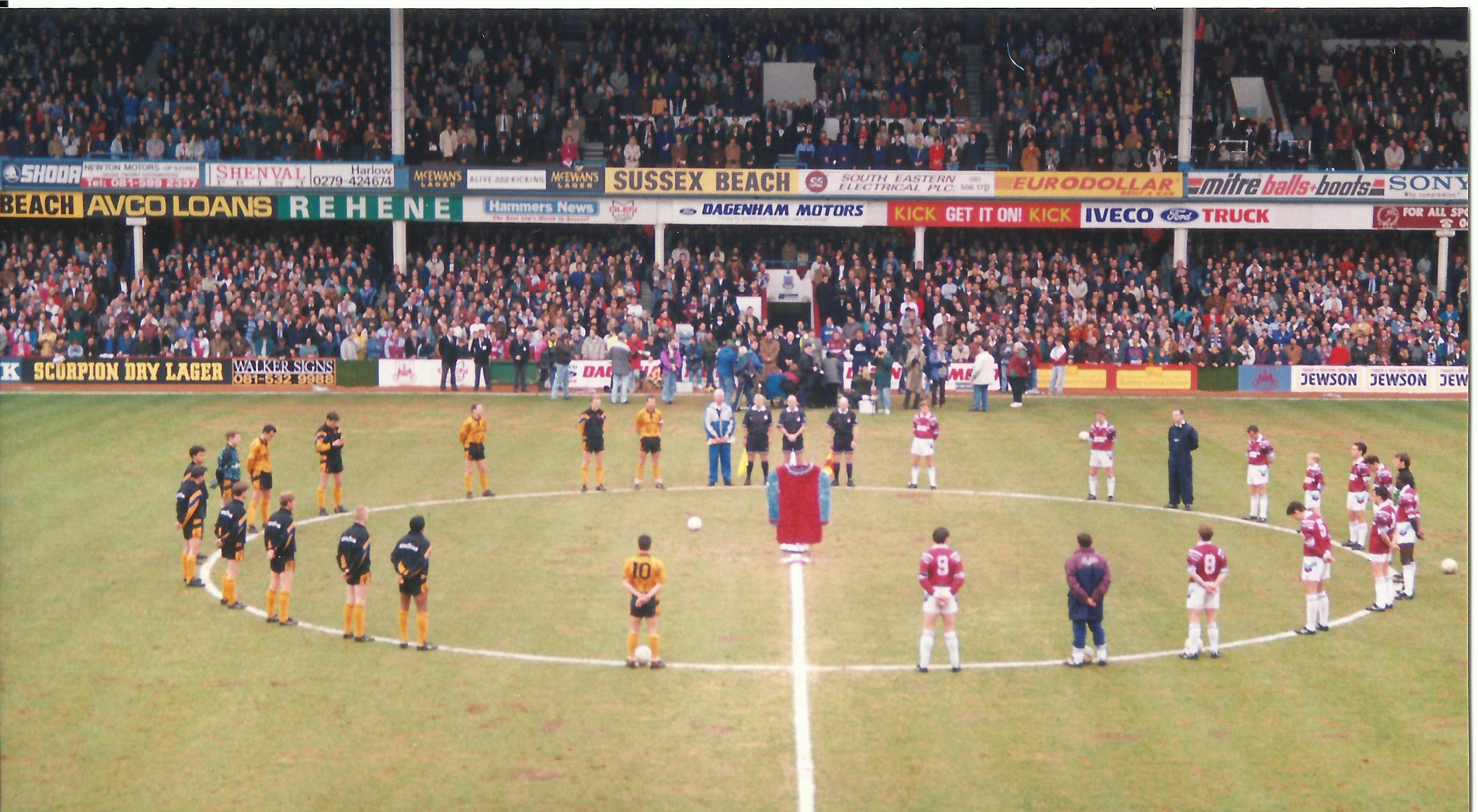
West Ham and Wolves players line up for a minute's silence for Bobby Moore before their game at the Boleyn Ground on 6 March 1993

His former England teammate, Jack Charlton, on a BBC documentary of Moore's life in and outside of football, said of Moore's death:

Well, I only ever cried over two people, Billy Bremner and Bob... [long pause] He was a lovely man.

On 28 June 1993, a public service was held in Westminster Abbey, attended by all the other members of the 1966 World Cup team. He was only the second sportsman to be so honoured, the first being West Indies cricketer Frank Worrell.

For many years he delighted supporters of West Ham and was a formidable opponent in the eyes of those against whom he played. But it is for his appearances for England — ninety of them as captain — that he will be chiefly remembered, and supremely for his captaincy of the World Cup team of 1966.

— Dean of Westminster

== Legacy ==
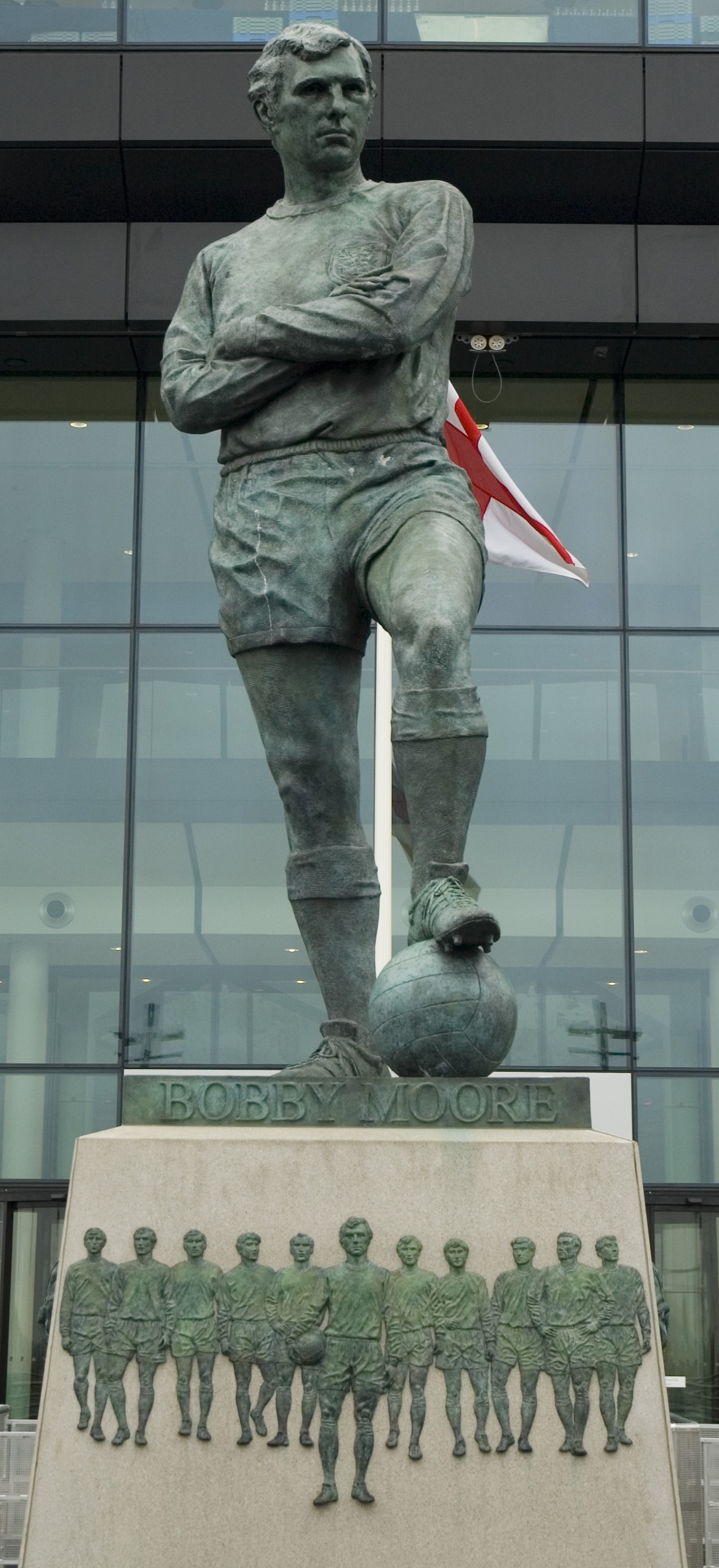
The statue of Bobby Moore outside the entrance to Wembley Stadium

The Bobby Moore Fund is a charity in the United Kingdom, formed in 1993 by Stephanie Moore and Cancer Research UK (CRUK) in memory of her late husband to raise money for research into bowel cancer and also public awareness of the disease. A campaign, Make Bobby Proud was initiated in 2013 to fundraise. As of February 2013 the Bobby Moore Fund had raised £18.8m towards bowel cancer research.

In 1996, comedians Frank Skinner and David Baddiel used the line "But I still see that tackle by Moore" in the lyrics to their song "Three Lions", which was the England team's official song at the 1996 European Championships, which was adopted by fans rather than the tournament's official song "We're In This Together" by Simply Red. It referred to the famous incident with Jairzinho in 1970, and was re-created by Baddiel, Skinner and England left back Stuart Pearce for the video. It was written in the context of a list of great England moments of the past as proof that England could win a tournament again.

Moore was made an inaugural inductee of the English Football Hall of Fame in 2002 in recognition of his impact on the English game as a player. The same year he was named in the BBC's list of the 100 Greatest Britons. In November 2003, to celebrate UEFA's Jubilee, he was selected as the Golden Player of England by The Football Association as their most outstanding player of the past 50 years.

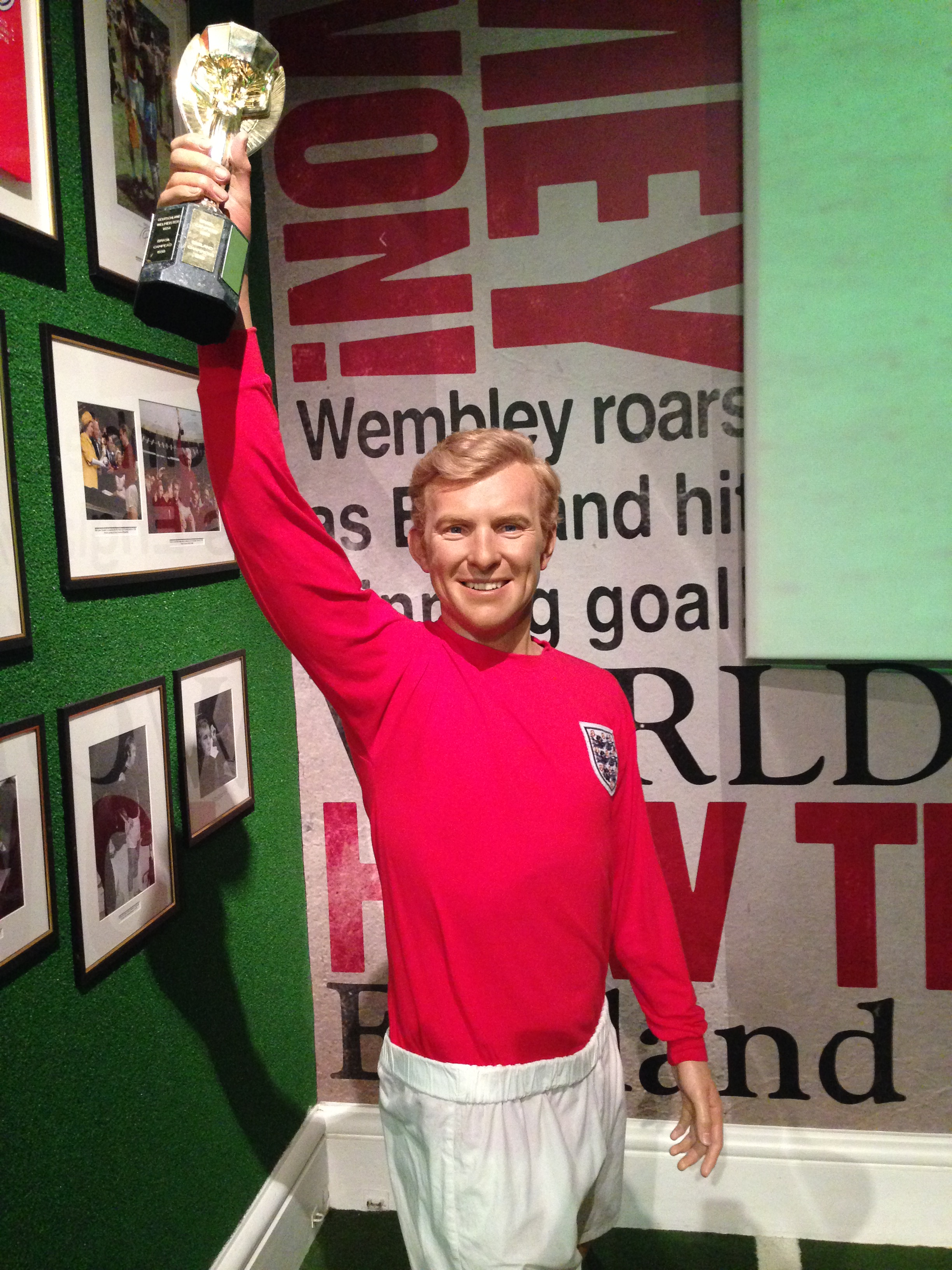
Waxwork of Moore at Madame Tussauds, London

On 28 April 2003, Prince Andrew as president of The Football Association unveiled the World Cup Sculpture (also called The Champions) in a prominent place near the Boleyn Ground, at the junction of Barking Road and Green Street. It depicts Moore holding the Jules Rimet Trophy aloft, on the shoulders of Geoff Hurst and Ray Wilson, together with Martin Peters. The one and a half-size bronze was sculpted by Philip Jackson after a famous photograph taken just after the 1966 final at the old Wembley. The south bank at West Ham's ground up until 2016, the Boleyn Ground in Upton Park, was named the Bobby Moore Stand shortly after Moore's death. When West Ham moved to the London Stadium in 2016, a stand at the north end of the stadium was redesignated as the Bobby Moore Stand, and was officially opened as such before a pre-season friendly match against Italian side Juventus. The Moore family was represented at the official opening ceremony by Moore's grandson, Frederick Moore-Hobbis.

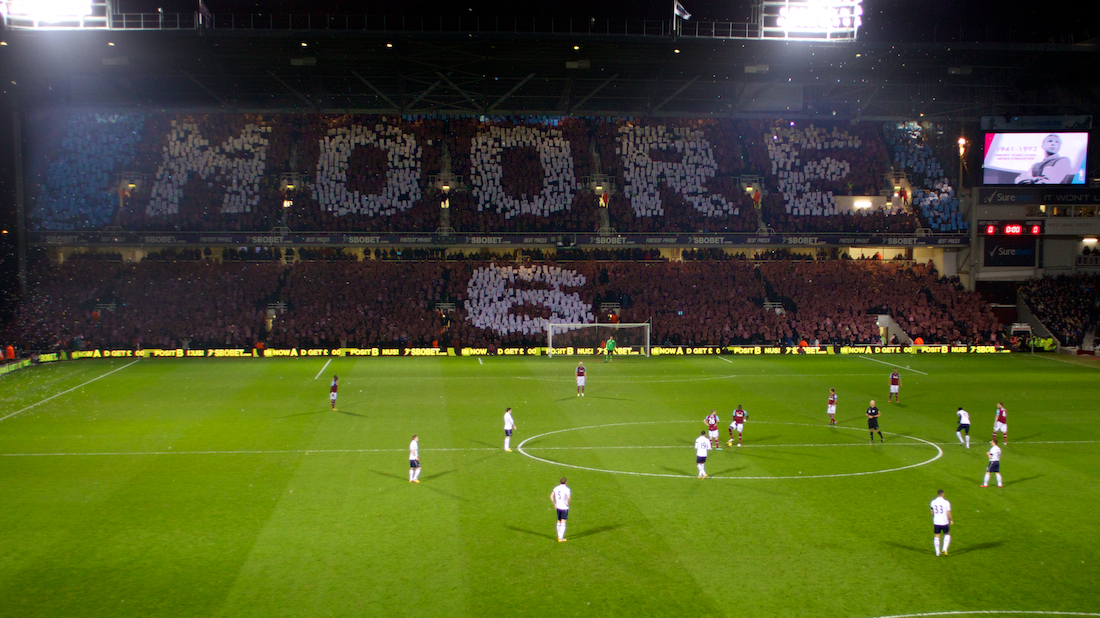
West Ham fans display a mosaic of Moore and 6 as a tribute to Moore twenty years after his death

On Friday 11 May 2007, a statue of Bobby Moore was unveiled by Bobby Charlton outside the entrance of the newly reconstructed Wembley Stadium as the "finishing touch" to the project, with the stadium officially opening on Saturday 19 May with the staging of the 2007 FA Cup Final. The twice life-size bronze statue, also sculpted by Jackson, depicts Moore looking down Wembley Way.

In August 2008, West Ham United officially retired the number 6 shirt as a mark of respect, 15 years after his death.

On 26 July 2016, Moore became the first footballer to be honoured with an English Heritage Blue Plaque outside his home. The plaque was unveiled on a brick wall at Moore's childhood home in Waverley Gardens, Barking in a ceremony attended by his daughter, Roberta. In April 2017 airline Norwegian announced Moore's image would appear on the tail fin one of their Boeing 737-800 aircraft. Moore is one of the company's six "British tail fin heroes", joining Queen frontman Freddie Mercury, children's author Roald Dahl, pioneering pilot Amy Johnson, novelist Jane Austen and aviation entrepreneur Freddie Laker. In 2018, Moore was added as an icon to the Ultimate Team in EA Sports' FIFA video game FIFA 19.

The Bobby Moore Academy primary and secondary schools are located in the Queen Elizabeth Olympic Park in Newham near to the London Stadium and were founded in 2017. The academy has access to facilities at the Park in addition to links to West Ham United, and will have 1,500 student places at full capacity.

== Personal life ==
Moore was a talented junior cricketer, captaining South of England schoolboys and representing Essex youth team, alongside long term footballing teammate, Geoff Hurst.

Moore met his first wife, Tina Dean, in 1957. They married on 30 June 1962. They lived in a house in Chigwell, Essex, that they called "Morlands". They had a daughter, Roberta, and a son, Dean. They separated in 1984, and divorced in 1986.

In 1979 Moore met, and began an affair with 29 year old British Airways flight attendant Stephanie Parlane whilst he was on tour in South Africa. They married on 4 December 1991.

Moore was fined £150 and banned from driving for 12 months for drink-driving on 12 April 1977, following his 36th birthday celebrations in Stratford. On 15 December 1983, he was arrested in Biggleswade, Bedfordshire and banned from driving for three years and subsequently fined £175 for drink-driving on 11 January 1984.

In 1972, he captained Olympiacos in a friendly match against Corinthians. The match ended in a 2–0 victory for Corinthians.

Moore publicly supported Margaret Thatcher at the 1979 general election.

Moore was Sports Editor of the Sunday Sport from 1986 to 1990 and then joined London radio station Capital Gold as a football analyst and commentator in 1990, a position he held until shortly before his death.

His life after football was eventful and difficult, with poor business dealings and his marriage ending. Moore's supporters said that The Football Association could have given a role to him, as the only Englishman to captain a FIFA World Cup winning team or given him an ambassadorial role.

His son, Dean, died, aged 43, in his flat on 28 July 2011. A coroner's inquest found that he died as a result of Diabetic ketoacidosis.

== Quotes ==
- "My captain, my leader, my right-hand man. He was the spirit and the heartbeat of the team. A cool, calculating footballer I could trust with my life. He was the supreme professional, the best I ever worked with. Without him England would never have won the World Cup." Alf Ramsey*
- "He was my friend as well as the greatest defender I ever played against. The world has lost one of its greatest football players and an honourable gentleman." Pelé
- "Bobby Moore was a real gentleman and a true friend." Franz Beckenbauer
- "Moore was the best defender I have ever seen." Alex Ferguson
- "Bobby Moore was the best defender in the history of the game" Franz Beckenbauer
- "There should be a law against him. He knows what's happening 20 minutes before everyone else." Jock Stein
- "Ask me to talk about Bobby Moore the footballer and I will talk for days. Ask me about the man and I will dry up in a minute." Ron Greenwood
- "Immaculate footballer. Imperial defender. Immortal hero of 1966. First Englishman to raise the World Cup aloft. Favourite son of London's East End. Finest legend of West Ham United. National Treasure. Master of Wembley. Lord of the game. Captain extraordinary. Gentleman of all time." Inscription on the pedestal of the statue at Wembley Stadium, composed by Moore's biographer Jeff Powell.
- "Bobby could thread an attacker through the eye of a needle. A gentleman and a scholar. Lovely stuff." Garth Crooks

== Career statistics ==
=== Club ===
Appearances and goals by club, season and competition
Club	Season	League			FA Cup		League Cup		Other		Total	
Club	Season	Division	Apps	Goals	Apps	Goals	Apps	Goals	Apps	Goals	Apps	Goals
West Ham United	1958–59	First Division	5	0	0	0	0	0	1 (Note: Appearances in Southern Professional Floodlit Cup)	0	6	0
West Ham United	1959–60	First Division	13	0	0	0	0	0	2	0	15	0
West Ham United	1960–61	First Division	38	1	2	0	2	1	—		42	2
West Ham United	1961–62	First Division	41	3	1	0	2	0	—		44	3
West Ham United	1962–63	First Division	41	3	5	0	1	0	—		47	3
West Ham United	1963–64	First Division	37	2	7	0	6	0	—		50	2
West Ham United	1964–65	First Division	28	1	0	0	0	0	8 (Note: Appearance in FA Charity Shield) (Note: Appearances in European Cup Winners' Cup)	0	35	1
West Ham United	1965–66	First Division	37	0	4	0	9	2	6	0	56	2
West Ham United	1966–67	First Division	40	2	2	0	6	0	—		48	2
West Ham United	1967–68	First Division	40	4	3	0	3	0	—		46	4
West Ham United	1968–69	First Division	41	2	3	0	3	0	—		47	2
West Ham United	1969–70	First Division	40	0	1	0	2	0	—		43	0
West Ham United	1970–71	First Division	39	2	1	0	2	0	—		42	2
West Ham United	1971–72	First Division	40	1	4	0	10	0	—		54	1
West Ham United	1972–73	First Division	42	3	2	0	2	0	—		46	3
West Ham United	1973–74	First Division	22	0	1	0	1	0	1 (Note: Appearance in Texaco Cup)	0	24	0
West Ham United	Total		544	24	36	0	49	3	18	0	647	27
Fulham	1973–74	Second Division	10	1	—		—		—		10	1
Fulham	1974–75	Second Division	41	0	12	0	3	0	—		54	0
Fulham	1975–76	Second Division	33	0	1	0	3	0	—		37	0
Fulham	1976–77	Second Division	40	0	2	0	5	0	—		47	0
Fulham	Total		124	1	15	0	11	0	—		148	1
Career total			668	25	51	0	60	3	18	0	795	28

=== International ===
Appearances and goals by national team and year
National team	Year	Apps	Goals
England	1962	8	0
England	1963	9	0
England	1964	9	0
England	1965	9	0
England	1966	15	2
England	1967	6	0
England	1968	9	0
England	1969	9	0
England	1970	11	0
England	1971	7	0
England	1972	6	0
England	1973	10	0
Total		108	2

Scores and results list England's goal tally first, score column indicates score after each Moore goal

List of international goals scored by Bobby Moore
No.	Cap	Date	Venue	Opponent	Score	Result	Competition
1	36	5 January 1966	Goodison Park, Liverpool, England	Poland	1–1	1–1	Friendly
2	39	29 June 1966	Ullevaal Stadion, Oslo, Norway	Norway	4–1	6–1	Friendly

== Honours ==
=== Player ===
West Ham United

- FA Cup: 1963–64
- FA Charity Shield: 1964
- European Cup Winners' Cup: 1964–65
- Football League Cup runner-up: 1965–66

Fulham

- FA Cup runner-up: 1974–75

Eastern

- Hong Kong Senior Shield: 1981–82

England

- FIFA World Cup: 1966
- UEFA Euro third place: 1968
- British Home Championship:
  - Winners: 1964–65, 1965–66, 1967–68, 1968–69, 1970–71, 1972–73
  - Shared: 1963–64, 1969–70, 1971–72

Individual

- Ballon d'Or runner-up: 1970, nominated: 1964, 1966, 1968, 1971, 1972, 1973
- FWA Footballer of the Year: 1964
- West Ham Player of the Year: 1961, 1963, 1968, 1970
- Dwight D. Eisenhower trophy as the International Soccer League MVP: 1963
- FUWO European Team of the Year: 1965, 1966, 1967, 1969, 1970, 1972
- FIFA World Cup All-Star Team: 1966
- BBC Sports Personality of the Year: 1966
- Officer of the Order of the British Empire: 1967
- UEFA Euro Team of the Tournament: 1968
- World Soccer World XI: 1968, 1969, 1971, 1972, 1973
- Rothmans Golden Boots Awards: 1970, 1971, 1972, 1973
- Sport Ideal European XI: 1971, 1972
- Inducted into the English Football Hall of Fame: 2002
- UEFA Jubilee Awards – Greatest English Footballer of the last 50 Years (Golden Player): 2003
- FIFA World Cup All-Time Team: 1994
- FIFA Order of Merit: 1996
- World Team of the 20th Century: 1998
- Number 6 retired by West Ham: 2008 (posthumous)
- World Soccer Greatest XI of All Time: 2013
- 100 Greatest Britons: 2002
- Football League 100 Legends
- IFFHS All-time Men's B Dream Team: 2021

== In film and television ==
Moore appeared in the 1981 film Escape to Victory, as Terry Brady, and in cameo roles, as himself, in several episodes of Till Death Do Us Part, including one of its spin-off films The Alf Garnett Saga.

Tina and Bobby, a television drama series about Tina and Bobby Moore's relationship, was broadcast on ITV in January 2017, and repeated in August 2020 and June 2021. The part of Bobby Moore is played by Lorne MacFadyen.

== See also ==
- List of footballers with 100 or more caps

== Bibliography ==
- Hamilton, Duncan (2023). Answered Prayers: England and the 1966 World Cup. United Kingdom: Quercus Publishing. ISBN 9781529419986.
