= Mick Dennis =

British journalist

Mick Dennis (born 10 May 1952 in Isleworth, Middlesex, England) is a retired sports writer, broadcaster, editor and columnist. In a career of more than 40 years in newspapers he wrote (mostly about football) for The Sun, The Sunday Times, The Daily Mirror, The Daily Telegraph, the London Evening Standard (where he held a number of executive positions, including sports editor) and The Daily Express, (where he was football correspondent from December 2003 until March 2015, when he retired from day-to-day journalism). During the first 15 years of the 2000s he appeared regularly on Sky News, had a weekly spot on Sky Sports News, was a guest presenter on Talksport radio and LBC radio and frequently contributed to programmes on BBC Radio 5 Live. He was a magistrate from 2005 until 2022, was an active football referee for more than 25 years and then mentored young referees for a decade. He volunteered in the communications department of the international aid charity Plan UK, was a trustee of Victim Support Hertfordshire and was an independent member of various funding panels for the Football Foundation. He was a trustee of Norwich City's Community Sports Foundation for nine years, and was a trustee of the Dacorum Sports Trust and its chair for five years. He was a founder member of Kick it Out's grassroots advisory group. He collaborated with referee Graham Poll on the latter's best-selling autobiography, "Seeing Red", and "Geoff Hurst, The Hand of God and the Biggest Rows in Football." He wrote a football book, The Team, which is part of the Quick Reads Initiative and contributed to four anthologies of sports writing. After retiring from newspaper and broadcast journalism in 2015 he edited three volumes of Norwich City essays called Tales From The city. He was one of the original contributors to the Norwich City blogsite My Football Writer and continues to write occasional columns for that site. He lives in Hemel Hempstead, Hertfordshire and has been married for almost 50 years. He and his wife, Sarah, a former journalist and charity worker, have two married sons and six grandchildren.
